= Kenneth D. Craig =

Canadian psychologist (born 1937)

Kenneth Denton Craig
- Born: 1937 (age 88–89); Calgary, Alberta, Canada
- Education: Sir George Williams College; University of British Columbia; Purdue University; Oregon Health Sciences University
- Scientific career
- Fields: Clinical psychology, pain
- Workplaces: University of British Columbia
- Thesis: Partner competency and prior success-failure experiences and determinants of manding in dyadic interactions (1964)

Kenneth D. Craig (born 1937) is a Canadian psychologist, educator and scientist whose research primarily concerns pain assessment, understanding pain in children and populations with communication limitations, and the social dimensions of pain.

== Career ==
Kenneth Craig was born in Calgary in 1937. He obtained his BA from Sir George Williams College (now Concordia University) in Montreal in 1958 followed by an MA from the University of British Columbia in 1960. He then went to Purdue University from which he graduated in 1964 with a Ph.D. in Clinical Psychology. This included a research fellowship and internship at the University of Oregon Medical School where he became interested in the study of pain which has remained the focus of his research for more than 40 years. He has served as editor-in-chief of the Canadian Journal of Behavioural Science (1985–89) and Pain Research & Management (2006–17). He has received many honours and distinctions, including appointment as an Officer of the Order of Canada in 2016.

He was appointed to the faculty at the University of British Columbia in 1963 and has remained there throughout his academic career, with sabbaticals at Oxford University and the University of Calgary. He served as Director of the Graduate Programme in Clinical Psychology and Associate Dean in the Faculty of Graduate Studies. He also served as a Canadian Institutes of Health Research Senior Investigator and a Canada Council I.W. Killam Research Fellow. He was appointed in 2003 as emeritus Professor of Psychology.

== Research ==
His research addresses psycho-social features of pain with a focus on pain assessment, particularly in populations with communication limitations, including infants, children and people with cognitive impairments. This work has compelled greater understanding of the importance of the social context in understanding pain experience and expression, the challenges of self-presentation and observer bias in understanding the pain of others, leading to the Social Communication Model of Pain. He pioneered development of measurement tools for pain in infants, young children, people with intellectual disabilities and persons with dementia, primarily focusing upon nonverbal behaviour and facial expression. His contributions to development of a facial expression measure of pain in the mouse led to burgeoning interest in measurement of pain in nonhuman animals. He has authored a large number of journal articles and chapters and authored or edited 11 books. He has a Google Scholar count of over 30,000 and a H index of 90.

== Publications ==
- Grunau, R., & Craig, K. (1987). Pain expression in neonates: facial action and cry. Pain 28 (3), 395–410
- Craig, K., et al. (1993). Pain in the preterm neonate: behavioural and physiological indices. Pain 52 (3), 287–299
- Hadjistavropoulos, T., & Craig, K. (2002). A theoretical framework for understanding self-report and observational measures of pain: a communications model. Behaviour research and therapy 40 (5), 551–570
- Craig, K. (2015). The Social Communication Model of Pain. Pain, 156, 1198–1199
- Craig, K., et al. (2020). Pain in persons who are marginalized by social conditions. Pain, 161, 261–265

== Awards ==
- 2019: Fellow, Canadian Academy of Health Sciences
- 2015: Officer of the Order of Canada
- 2015: Hon LL.D., Dalhousie University
- 2013: Distinguished Lifetime Achievement Award, International Association for the Study of Pain
- 2012: Distinguished Career Award, Canadian Pain Society
- 2008: Gold Medal Award, Canadian Psychological Association
- 2002: CPA Donald O. Hebb Award for Distinguished Contributions to Psychology as a Science
- 2002: Jeffrey Lawson Award for Advocacy in Children's Pain Relief, American Pain Society
- 1981: Fellow, American Psychological Association

== Positions ==
- Editor-in-Chief, Pain Research & Management
- Editor, Canadian Journal of Behavioural Science
- President, Canadian Psychological Association
- President, Canadian Pain Society
