= David Olsen =

David Olsen may refer to:

- David A. Olsen (1937–2009), chairman of brokerage firm Johnson & Higgins
- David S. Olsen (born 1988), Republican member of the Illinois House of Representatives
- David Olsen (soccer) (born 1996), American soccer player

== See also ==
- David Olson (disambiguation)
