= Canadian Journal of Experimental Psychology =

- Discipline: Experimental psychology
- Language: English, French
- Edited by: Debra Titone

Publication details
- History: 1947-present
- Publisher: American Psychological Association on behalf of the Canadian Psychological Association
- Frequency: Quarterly
- Impact factor: 1.2 (2023)

Standard abbreviations
- ISO 4: Can. J. Exp. Psychol.

Indexing
- ISSN: 1196-1961 (print); 1878-7290 (web)
- LCCN: sn93039555
- OCLC no.: 781472836

Links
- Journal homepage; Online archive; Journal page at publisher's website

Canadian Journal of Experimental Psychology is a quarterly peer-reviewed academic journal published by the American Psychological Association on behalf of the Canadian Psychological Association in collaboration with the Canadian Society for Brain, Behaviour, and Cognitive Science. It was established in 1947 and covers experimental psychology. Articles are published in English or French. The editor-in-chief is Debra Titone (McGill University).

== Abstracting and indexing ==
The journal is abstracted and indexed in:

- CINAHL
- Current Contents/Social & Behavioral Sciences
- Embase
- EBSCO databases
- Index Medicus/MEDLINE/PubMed
- Modern Language Association Database
- PASCAL
- PsycINFO
- Scopus
- Social Sciences Citation Index

According to the Journal Citation Reports, the journal has a 2023 impact factor of 1.2.

== Editors-in-chief ==
The following persons are or have been editors-in-chief:

- Debra Titone (McGill University, 2022-present)
- Randall K. Jamieson (University of Manitoba, 2018-2022)
- Penny M. Pexman (University of Calgary, 2014-2018)
- Douglas J. K. Mewhort (Queen's University, 2010-2014)
- Simon Grondin (Laval University, 2006-2010)
- Peter Dixon (University of Alberta, 2002-2006)
- Murray Singer (University of Manitoba, 1998-2002)
- Colin M. MacLeod (University of Toronto, 1994-1998)
- Vince Di Lollo (Simon Fraser University)
- Phillip Bryden University of Waterloo)
- P. Lynn Newbigging (McMaster University)
- Peter Dodwell (Queen's University)
