= Gordon H. Turner =

Canadian academic (1912–c.1994)

Gordon Haslam Turner
- Born: 1912; Montreal
- Died: c. 1994

Academic background
- Education: University of Toronto
- Thesis: (1939)

Gordon Haslam Turner (born 1912) was a Canadian psychologist who had a reputation for his research in occupational psychology and as an academic administrator.

== Academic career ==
Turner was born in Montreal. He attended the University of Toronto from which he received his BA in 1935, his MA in 1936 and his Ph.D. in 1939. The topic of his PhD dissertation was the effect of fixed-pace work upon health (Turner, 1943). He subsequently developed expertise in educational administration.

He then worked for two years (1939–1941) with the YMCA Auxiliary Service and as a research assistant with the National Research Council. With the outbreak of the Second World War he joined the Directorate of Personnel Selection of the Canadian Army. After demobilization he joined the Department of Psychology at the University of Western Ontario (UWO). He replaced Roy B. Liddy as Head of Psychology in 1954 and served as Professor and Head until 1960. He continued to serve as Professor and Head of the Department of Psychology, at UWO's University College, until 1963. He served as Dean of UWO's Talbot College from 1967 to 1968.

He was elected President of the Canadian Psychological Association in 1960. In his presidential address he decried the fragmentation of the study of human processes in psychology.

== Honours and awards ==
- President, Canadian Psychological Association 1960
- Fellow, Canadian Psychological Association, 1962

== Publications ==
- Turner, T.H. (1943). A study of the effect of fixed-pace work upon health. Canadian journal of public health, Vol.34 (2), p. 68-73
- Turner, T.H. (1956). Human Relations Training as Seen by a Psychologist.The Business quarterly, Vol.21 (1), p. 37
- Turner, G. H., & Penfold, D. J. (1952). The scholastic aptitude of Indian children of the Caradoc Reserve. Canadian Journal of Psychology / Revue canadienne de psychologie, 6(1), 31–44.
- Turner, T.H. (1950). A Factor Limiting the Effectiveness of Supervisor Training.The Business quarterly, Vol.15(3), p. 147
