= Helen McMurchie Bott =

Canadian author (born 1886)

Helen McMurchie Bott (1886–?) was a Canadian author on child development. Bott held degrees from the University of Toronto (Bachelor's, 1912; Master's, 1923). Her 1933 and 1934 books were the first and second ones published in the Child Development Series of the University of Toronto. She married the psychologist, Edward Alexander Bott (1887–1974), and they had three daughters, among them anthropologist Elizabeth Bott. Bott served as the head of parental education at the Institute of Child Study until 1938.

== Partial works ==
- Personality Development in Young Children
- Method in Social Studies of Young Children
- Adult Attitudes to Children's Misdemeanours
