= Bromiley =

Bromiley is a surname. Notable people with the surname include:

- Dorothy Bromiley (1930–2024), British film, stage and television actress
- Geoffrey W. Bromiley (1915–2009), English ecclesiastical historian and Anglican theologian
- Reg B. Bromiley (1911-?), Canadian experimental psychologist
