= David Olson =

David Olson may also refer to:

- David E. Olson, American chemist and neuroscientist
- David R. Olson (born 1935), Canadian cognitive developmental psychologist

== See also ==
- David Olsen (disambiguation)
