= Roy B. Liddy =

Canadian psychologist

- Scientific career
- Fields: Psychology
- Institutions: University of Western Ontario

Roy B. Liddy was a Canadian psychologist and founding President of the Canadian Psychological Association.

== Career ==
Liddy was Professor of Psychology at the University of Western Ontario. He held the post of Head of the Department of Philosophy and Psychology from 1931 to 1954.

In 1938, prior to the onset of the Second World War a group of psychologists came together to agree how they could assist in the process of personnel selection for the military. This group included Roy B. Liddy, Edward Alexander Bott, John MacEachran, George Humphrey, and George A. Ferguson. From this group was established the Canadian Psychological Association in 1939. The following year, 1940, Liddy became its inaugural President. He also held this position in 1946.

== Heritage ==
The R. B. Liddy Gold Medal is awarded to the best BA Honours student in Psychology at the University of Western Ontario.

== Positions ==
- President, Canadian Psychological Association (1940 and 1946)
