= Edward Alexander Bott =

Canadian psychologist (1887–1974)

- Born: April 11, 1887; Ingersoll, Ontario, Canada
- Died: January 28, 1974 (aged 86)
- Scientific career
- Fields: Psychology
- Institutions: University of Toronto

Edward Alexander Bott (April 11, 1887 – January 28, 1974) was a Canadian psychologist.

== Biography ==
Bott was born near Ingersoll, Ontario, in 1887.

In 1912, he joined the Faculty at the University of Toronto and took over the psychological laboratory which had been established by James Mark Baldwin in 1891. In 1925, he established the St. George's School for Child Study at the university which became the Institute of Child Study.. In 1926, he established an independent Department of Psychology and remained its Head until he retired in 1960.

He was one of the founders of organized psychology within Canada. In 1938, prior to the onset of the Second World War a group of psychologists came together to agree how they could assist in the process of personnel selection for the military. This group included Roy B. Liddy, Ned Bott, John MacEachran, George Humphrey, and George A. Ferguson. From this group was established the Canadian Psychological Association in 1939. In 1940, Liddy became its inaugural President and in the following year, Bott became president.

He conducted research into the application of psychology to social issues.

He was married to Helen McMurchie Bott who worked with him at the Institute of Child Study and was the father of noted network analyst and psychoanalyst Elizabeth Spillius.

== Awards ==
- 1947 - Order of the British Empire for development of training procedures for Royal Air Force
- Fellow, Canadian Psychological Association
- 1969 - Centennial Medal, Canadian Psychological Association
