= Keith Dobson =

Canadian psychologist

Keith Stephen Dobson OC
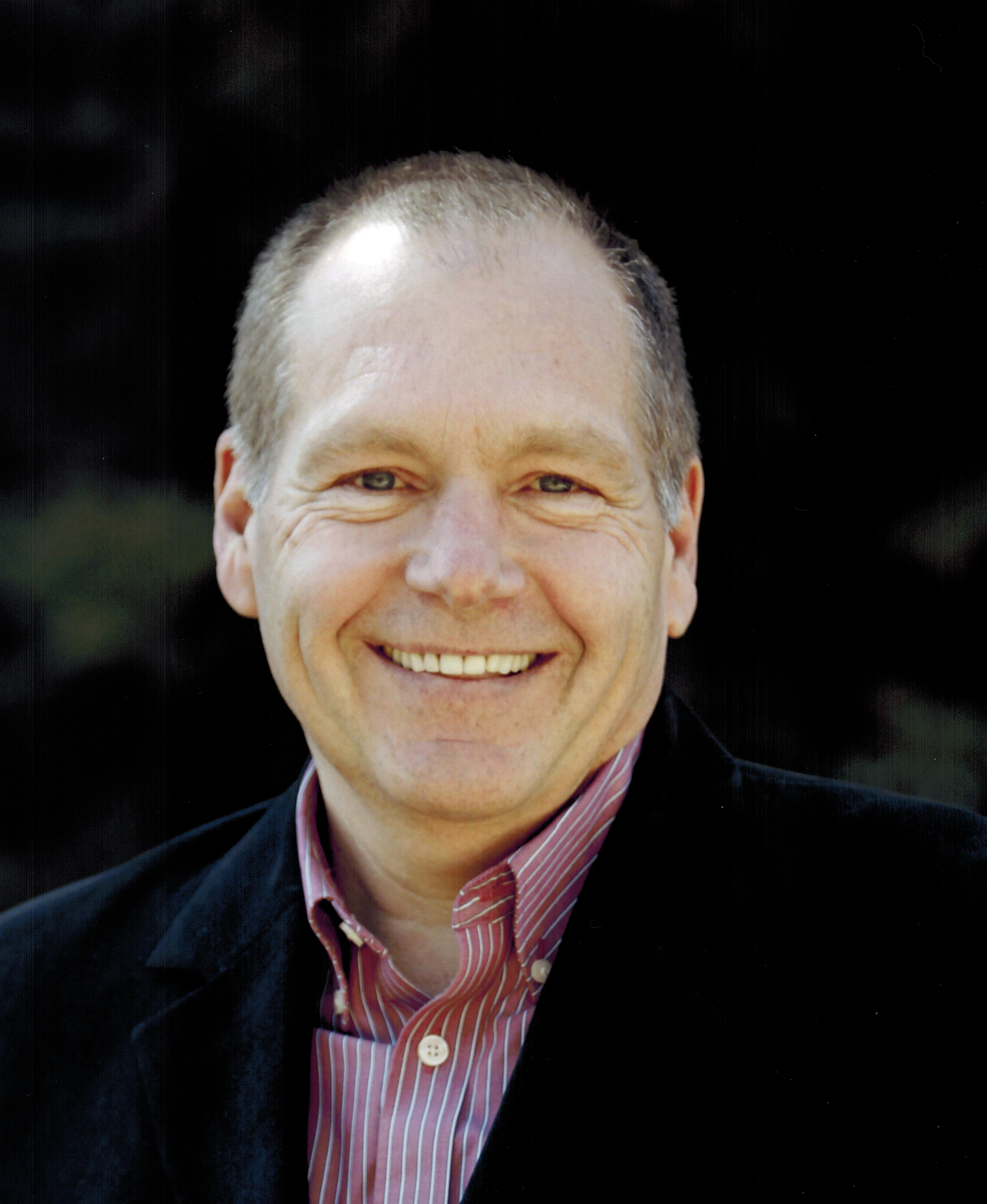
- Keith Dobson in 2013
- Born: January 27, 1954 (age 72); Canada
- Occupations: Psychologist; Lecturer; Professor Emeritus
- Awards: Park O. Davidson Memorial Award, British Columbia Psychological Association; Donald O. Hebb Award, Canadian Psychological Association; Honorary Lifetime Member, Russian Association for Cognitive and Behavioral Therapies; Officer of the Order of Canada

Academic background
- Education: BA, Psychology/Sociology; MA, Psychology; Ph.D, Psychology
- Alma mater: University of Alberta; University of Western Ontario
- Thesis: Accessing the interface between anxiety and depression (1980)

Keith Stephen Dobson OC is a Canadian psychologist, academic, and researcher. With a long career at the University of Calgary in Canada, he now holds the title of Professor Emeritus, having served as a tenured Professor, Head of the Psychology Department, and Director of the Clinical Psychology program at the university.

Dobson's research primarily delves into cognition and psychopathological states, with an emphasis on depression. His work spans the exploration of cognitive models and mechanisms in depression, as well as innovative approaches to its treatment. While he has made many substantial contributions to the field of clinical psychology, his contributions to cognitive behavioral therapy stand out as a hallmark of his research efforts. Dobson's research has resulted in over 300 published articles, numerous book chapters, and books, including Evidence-based Practice of Cognitive behavior Therapy (2017), The Therapeutic Relationship in Cognitive-behavioral Therapy (2017) and the Handbook of Cognitive-behavioral Therapies (2019).

Along with his University appointments, Dobson has served as president of various organizations, including the World Confederation of Cognitive and Behavioral Therapies, the Academy of Cognitive Therapy, the Canadian Psychological Association, the International Association for Cognitive Psychotherapy, and the British Columbia Psychological Association. Furthermore, he was awarded as an Honorary Advisor for the Chinese Association of Cognitive-behavioral therapy during the early 2010s.

== Education ==
Dobson received his bachelor's degree in Psychology and Sociology from University of Alberta in 1975. He received his Masters (1977) and Doctoral (1980) degrees in psychology from University of Western Ontario, and became a Registered Psychologist from the College of Alberta Psychologists in 1989.

== Career ==
After his doctoral studies, Dobson became Clinical Lecturer (1980–1981) and then Clinical Assistant Professor (1981–1982) at the University of Western Ontario Department of Psychiatry He was then appointed by the University of British Columbia as assistant professor in 1982 and promoted to associate professor in 1987. In 1989, he joined the University of Calgary as an associate professor before promotion to Professor of Psychology in 1993.

Dobson was appointed as an honorary visiting professor at University of Hong Kong (2004) and Roehamptom University (2009). He interned at the University Hospital-London and the St. Thomas Psychiatric Hospital in St. Thomas, Ontario, in the late 1970s before being appointed as a Psychometrist at University Hospital-London in 1980. In the following two years, he served as assistant director of Depression Research Unit at University of Western Ontario. From 1983 till 1989, he was associated with Shaughnessy Hospital, Vancouver as a Professional Associate at Department of Psychiatry. During this tenure, he also served as a Psychologist at the Ministry of Health in Vancouver.

In 2010, the Centro de Psicoterapie y Asesoraiento Psicologio Keith Dobson was named after him in La Paz, Bolivia.

== Research ==
Dobson has conducted research on cognitive behavioral therapy, clinical psychology and different psychopathological states, particularly depression. His research is focused on both cognitive models and mechanisms in depression, and the treatment of depression.

In the general field of clinical psychology, his research indicated that the directors of clinical training had varying opinions regarding the importance of diversity materials and that the commonly adopted training methods were not very effective. He wrote an article in the mid-2010s highlighting issues such as aboriginal services, prescriptive authority and medically assisted death, in a Canadian context.

His research on therapy indicated feasibility of cognitive behavior therapy for depression. He co-developed a scale and participated in several studies that examined avoidance as a coping strategy and its link to depression. He found that the cognitive behavioral avoidance scale (CBAS) had significant association with symptoms of depression, anxiety and stress while having no association with the schema compensatory behavior strategy. He participated in several trials in treatment and prevention of acute depression. He has worked on cognitive assessment in depression, the interactive role of cognition and life events in the causation of depression, the capability of assessment tools to differentiate anxiety from depression, and description of stable and unstable aspects of cognition associated with depression.

He compared the efficiency and problem solving approach of depressed and non-depressed college students. Variations were observed in the strategy score among the students: it indicated a conservative problem-solving style along with a deficit in problem solving in the depressed students. He conducted a study in Iran regarding the negative thoughts in depression as proposed by the clinical theory of depression showing that depressed individuals had significantly more negative thoughts regarding self and future as compared to non-depressed individuals. In a study regarding cognitive assessment measures and major depressive disorders, his research indicated the existence of correlated cognitions that are specific to depression. He also worked on identifying the complementary patterns that might influence effectiveness of cognitive therapy for depression using he structural analysis of social behavior and lag sequential analysis in order to code cognitive therapy sessions for depressed individuals and for the analysis of client and therapist interpersonal behavior sequences.

A later focus of his work is on the prediction and prevention of relapse in depression. He studied the effect of cognitive behavioral therapy (CT) and behavioral marital therapy (BMT) for the treatment of depressed wives and for the improvement in martial satisfaction. Dobson found that BMT had a significant and positive influence on the relationship satisfaction of distressed couples while the combination of both the CT and BMT proved to be effective in reducing the aversive behavior of the married couples.

In 2019, he co-wrote the article ‘Concurrent and Prospective Relations between Attentional Biases for Emotional Images and Relapse to Depression’. The participants in this study were administered eye tracking tasks in order to measure attentional biases for emotional images. The participants were then observed for relapse to depression. The results indicated that reduced attention to positive images prospectively predicted relapse to depression among the previously depressed women.

=== Later research ===
Dobson is a Principal Investigator for the Opening Minds program which focuses on stigma reduction related to mental disorders in the workplace. He published a paper in 2010 reviewing various workplace anti-stigma intervention programs around the world, and suggested ways to improve the program efficacy by addressing the culture and norms regarding mental disorders within organizations. He is also involved in the development of programs that educate about mental health, reduce stigma and promote wellness and resilience; These programs include The Working Mind and The Inquiring Mind, which have been offered to tens of thousands of participants, as part of the Mental Health Commission of Canada, and extensively evaluated by Dobson and others.

He also examined the relationship between childhood adversity and adult health problems in primary care. In a study of the association between adverse childhood experiences, resilience and depression. The participants involved in the research were exposed to several tests measuring childhood adversity, psychological resilience and severity of depression symptoms. His research has implications in the development of depression treatments for individuals having history of childhood adversity. He studied the effects of adult depression on the recollection of adverse childhood experiences. Participants recruited from primary care clinics, for the purpose of this research, were to complete self-reported measures of depression and adverse childhood experiences. His study indicated that variations in the depression symptoms did not correspond with the variations of adverse childhood experience scores among the participants, and that the adverse childhood experience measures are suitable for use in healthcare environment.

== Awards and honours ==
- 2001 - Award for Distinguished Contribution to Canadian Psychology as a Profession, Canadian Psychological Association
- 2013 - Aaron T. Beck Institute for Cognitive Studies annual award for "Excellence of Contributions to Cognitive-behavioral Therapy", Assumption College
- 2013 - Donald O. Hebb Award for “Distinguished Contributions to Canadian Psychology as a Science”, Canadian Psychological Association
- 2017 - Award for Distinguished Contribution to Internationalization of Psychology, Canadian Psychological Association
- 2018 - Honorary Lifetime Member, Russian Association for Cognitive and Behavioral Therapies
- 2019 - Honorary Lifetime Member, College of Psychologists of Peru
- 2023 - Officer of the Order of Canada

== Publications ==
- Advances in Cognitive-Behavior Therapies. (1996) ISBN 978-0761906438
- The Prevention of Anxiety and Depression: Theory, Research, and Practice. (2004) ISBN 978-1591470793
- Risk Factors in Depression. (2008) ISBN 978-0080450780
- Evidence-based Practice of Cognitive Behavior Therapy (2009) ISBN 978-1606230206
- Cognitive Therapy (2012) ISBN 978-1433810886
- Cognitive Behavioral Therapy Techniques and Strategies. (2016) ISBN 9781433822377
- The Therapeutic Relationship in Cognitive Behavior Therapy: The Heart and Soul of Effective Practice. (2017) ISBN 978-1462531288
