= Glenn E. MacDonald =

Canadian psychologist

Glenn Ewan MacDonald
- Born: Glenn Ewan MacDonald; 21 August 1925; Rothbury, Saskatchewan
- Died: 24 July 1978 (aged 52); Toronto, Ontario
- Education: University of Toronto
- Scientific career
- Fields: experimental psychology
- Workplaces: University of Toronto
- Thesis: Finger temperature changes in two groups of psychiatric patients in response to conditions of success, failure and mild electric shock. (1955)
- Doctoral advisor: C. Roger Myers
- Doctoral students: Sara Shettleworth

Glenn Ewan MacDonald (21 August 1925 – 24 July 1978) was an experimental psychologist who played a prominent role in the establishment of psychology as a discipline in Canada.

== Career ==
MacDonald was born in 1925, and grew up in Rothbury, Saskatchewan. He studied at the University of Toronto from which he earned a PhD in psychology. He spent the remainder of his career there being promoted to a full professorship.

== Research ==
MacDonald's research was largely concerned with aspects of experimental and applied psychology.

== Professional ==
MacDonald played a very active role in the developing the Canadian Psychological Association in which he was President in 1978. he served as both Vice-President and President of the Ontario Educational Research Council, was one of the founders and President of the Ontario Council of Academic Psychologists.

== Publications ==
- Doob, A.N., & MacDonald, G.E. (1979). Television Viewing and Fear of Victimization: Is the Relationship Causal? Journal of Personality and Social Psychology, 37 (2), 170-179.
- MacDonald, G. E. (1976). Evaluation of Canadian psychology departments based on citation and publication counts: A comment. Canadian Psychological Review / Psychologie Canadienne, 17(4), 300–301.
- MacDonald, G.E., & de Toledo, L. (1974). Partial reinforcement effects and type of reward. Learning and Motivation, 5 (3), 288-298.
