= Club Soda (Montreal) =

Music venue in Montreal, Quebec, Canada

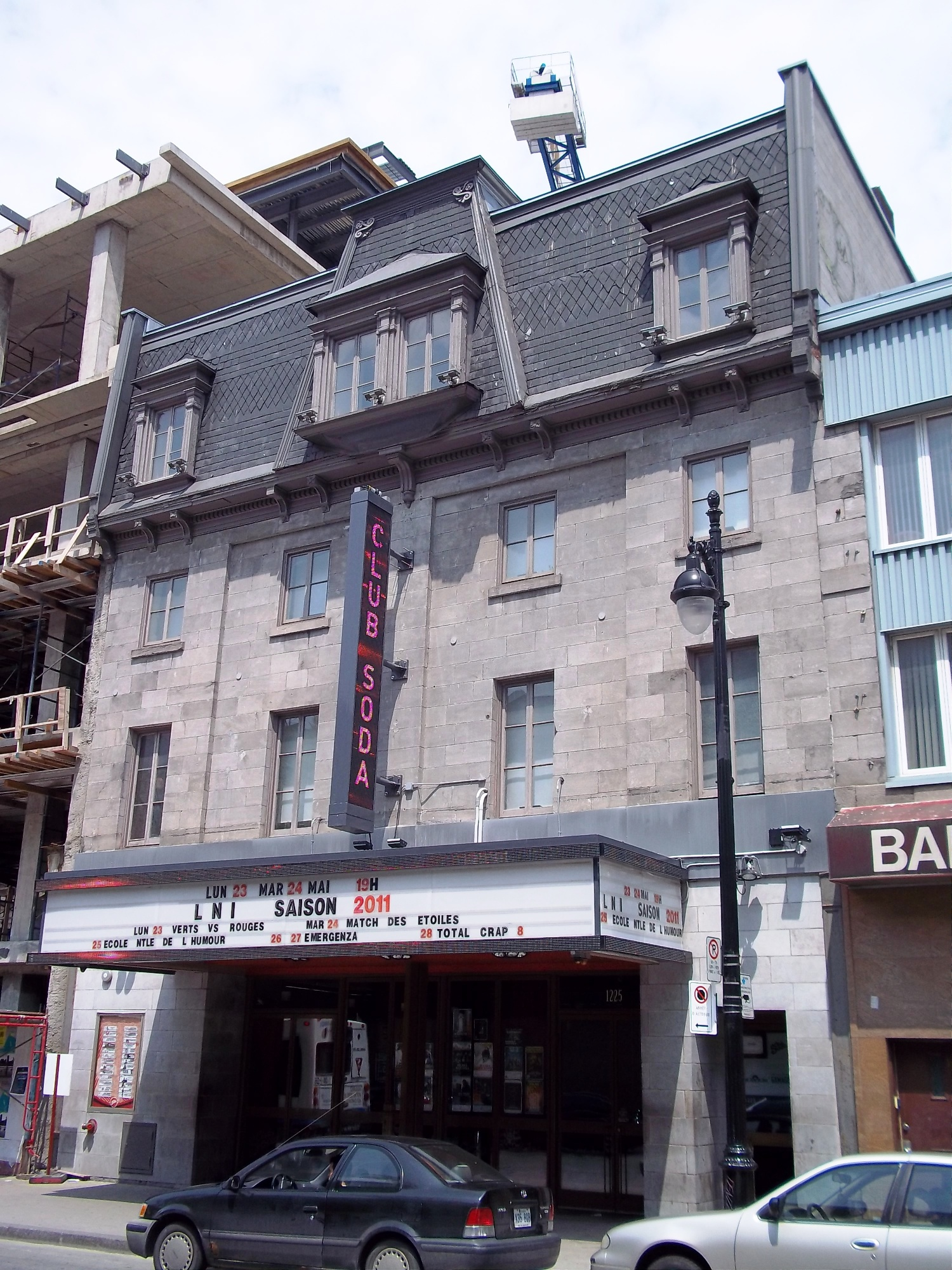
- Club Soda, Montréal 2011
- Interactive map of Club Soda
- Address: 1225 Saint Laurent Boulevard; Montreal; Canada
- Coordinates: 45.5098°N 73.5633°W
- Event: music

Construction
- Built: 1908

Website
- www.clubsoda.ca/en/

Club Soda is a music venue in Montreal, Quebec, Canada. Its address is 1225 Saint Laurent Boulevard in the Quartier des spectacles in the borough of Ville-Marie.

== History ==
Club Soda was established in 1982 by Joseph Martellino, Guy Gosselin, André Gagnon and Martin Després. The first act at Club Soda was Boule Noire on November 18, 1982, which was followed by Ding et Dong.

Club Soda was originally located at 5240 Park Avenue, at what is now the Théâtre Fairmount. The Montreal concert promoter, Rubin Fogel, became a part owner in 1985. The original Club Soda closed in July 1999. It reopened in its current location on Saint Laurent Boulevard on March 21, 2000, following extensive renovations. The building in which it is currently located was constructed in 1908 and was known as the Crystal Palace. During the 1940s, it was a cabaret. The current owners of the club are Després, Fogel, and Fogel's longtime concert promotion partner, Michel Sabourin.
