= John L. Arnett =

Canadian psychologist

- Education: University of Manitoba
- Scientific career
- Fields: Clinical psychology
- Workplaces: University of Manitoba
- Thesis: Early visual information processing as a function of age and reading ability (1977)

John L. Arnett is a Canadian psychologist whose work concerned developing clinical health psychology.

== Career ==
Arnett has spent the majority of his career at the University of Manitoba, Winnipeg from which he obtained a PhD in Clinical Psychology followed by a Fellowship in Clinical Neuropsychology at Institute of Living, Hartford, Connecticut. He returned to Canada and in 1985 was appointed Head of the Department of Clinical Health Psychology at the University of Manitoba. This department was designed to expand the remit of psychologists in healthcare beyond mental health into physical health.

Arnett's publications focus on arguing for the need for clinical psychologists to have a wider remit within healthcare.

== Publications ==
- Arnett, J.L. (2001). Clinical and Health Psychology: Future Directions.
- Arnett, J.L. (2006). Psychology and health.
- Arnett, J.L., Nicholson, I.R., & Breault, L. (2006). Psychology's Role in Health in Canada

== Positions ==
- President, Canadian Psychological Association (2005)
- President, Psychological Association of Manitoba (2012)

== Awards ==
- 2000: Award for Distinguished Contribution to Psychology as a Profession, Canadian Psychological Association
