= Mary J. Wright =

Canadian psychologist (1915–2014)

- Born: Mary J. Wright; 1915; Strathroy, Ontario, Canada
- Died: April 23, 2014 (aged 98–99); Strathroy, Ontario, Canada
- Education: University of Western Ontario, University of Toronto
- Scientific career
- Workplaces: University of Western Ontario
- Doctoral advisor: Bill Laine

Mary J. Wright (1915–2014) was a Canadian psychologist who was a pioneer for women in psychology in Canada.

== Early life ==
Mary J. Wright was born in Strathroy, Ontario in 1915. Her parents were Mary Jean (nee Clark) and Ernest Wright. She had four brothers. Her parents were owners of the Wright Piano Company. After an active academic career she retired to her hometown where she died in 2014.

== Career ==
Mary J. Wright obtained her BA in Philosophy and Psychology from the University of Western Ontario in 1935. This was followed by an MA from the University of Toronto. She then obtained a research post at the Institute of Child Study at the University of Toronto. During the war, she worked with evacuated children in Britain. In 1946, she joined the faculty at the University of Western Ontario. While there she completed her PhD (1949) on the effect of advancement classes for gifted students. She remained at the University of Western Ontario until her retirement becoming Chair of the Department of Psychology (1960–67) - the first woman in Canada to hold such a position. She founded the University Laboratory Preschool. On her retirement, Wright was appointed professor emerita. Wright was active in the Canadian Psychological Association becoming its first woman President and in many other regional associations for children and young people.

== Publications ==
- Wright, M. J. (1974). CPA: The first ten years. Canadian Psychologist, 15(2), 112–131.
- Wright, M. J. (1980). Measuring the social competence of preschool children. Canadian Journal of Behavioural Science, 12(1), 17–32.
- Wright, M. J. & Myers, C. R. (Eds.).(1982). History of academic psychology in Canada. Toronto: Hogrefe.
- Wright, M. J., & High, F. (1983). Compensatory education in preschool: A Canadian approach. The University of Western Ontario preschool project. Ypsilanti, MI: High/Scope Press.

== Positions ==
- 1969: President, Canadian Psychological Association
- President, Ontario Psychological Association

== Awards ==
- Fellow, American Psychological Association
- Gold Medal, Canadian Psychological Association
- Distinguished Contribution to Psychology Award, Ontario Psychological Association
- Year of the Child Award, Ontario Psychological Foundation
- Children's Service Award, Association for Early Childhood Education (Ontario)

== Heritage ==
In 2001, the laboratory school at the University of Western Ontario named the Mary J. Wright laboratory school in honour of her work and contribution of $500,000 toward it. The Psychology Centre at Huron University College was named the Mary J. Wright Centre The new public school in Strathroy was named the Mary J. Wright School. The History and Philosophy of Psychology section of the Canadian Psychological Association established a student award in her honour.
