= Janel Gauthier =

Canadian psychologist

- Born: Janel Gauthier; 1950 (age 75–76)
- Citizenship: Canadian
- Occupation: Professor
- Known for: psychological ethics

Academic background
- Education: Queen's University at Kingston
- Thesis: Optimal criteria for determining exposure to phobic stimuli in flooding therapy (1975)

Academic work
- Discipline: Psychology
- Sub-discipline: Clinical psychology
- Institutions: Laval University

Janel Gauthier (born 1950) is a Canadian psychologist with expertise in clinical psychology, human rights and ethics.

== Career ==
He received his doctorate in psychology from Queen's University at Kingston, Ontario, Canada, in 1975. He spent most of his academic career at Laval University, Quebec City from which he retired as Professor Emeritus in 2012.

He has served extensively on national, regional and international organizations of psychology. In Québec, these include the Québec Foundation for Migraine and Headaches and the Québec Association for Anxiety Disorders.

== Research ==
His research and practice has had two main themes. The first has been the use of behavioural, cognitive, and social psychology in the treatment of anxiety and mood disorders, the enhancement of low social self-esteem and the management of grief reactions and chronic headaches. The second has been ethics and human rights. He led the development of the Universal Declaration of Ethical Principles for Psychologists which was adopted by the International Union of Psychological Science and the International Association of Applied Psychology in 2008.

== Publications ==
- Gauthier, J.G., Anne‐Louise Fournier, A.-L., & Claude Roberge, C.(1991). The Differential Effects of Biofeedback in the Treatment of Menstrual and Nonmenstrual Migraine, Headache.
- Gauthier, J., Cote, G., & French, D. (1994). The role of home practice in the thermal biofeedback treatment of migraine headache. Journal of consulting and clinical psychology.
- Gauthier, J. (2009). Ethical principles and human rights: Building a better world globally. Counselling Psychology Quarterly.

== Other activities ==
Gauthier has been active in Taekwon-Do in which he holds a Black belt.

== Positions ==
- President, International Association of Applied Psychology(IAAP)
- 1997-1999: President, Canadian Psychological Association

== Awards ==
- 2022: Prix Noël-Mailloux, Order des psychologues du Québec
- 2016: Fukuhara Award for Distinguished Contributions to the International Community of Professional Associations and the Discipline of Psychology, International Council of Psychologists
- Fellow, Canadian Psychological Association
- 2015: Outstanding International Psychologist Award, American Psychological Association, Division 52 (International Psychology)
- 2014: Prix Mérite du Conseil interprofessionnel du Québec, Order des psychologues du Québec
- 2013: Interamerican Psychology Award for Distinguished Contributions to the Development of Psychology as a Science and as a Profession in the Americas, Interamerican Psychological Society
