= Lily Inglis =

Canadian architect

- Born: 11 October 1926; Milan, Italy
- Died: 11 January 2010 (aged 83); Kingston, Ontario
- Occupation: Architect
- Spouse: James Inglis
- Awards: Livable City Design Award, Life-time Achievement Award
- Practice: Architect
- Buildings: Kingston Frontenac Public Library

Lily Inglis (1926-2010) was a Canadian architect born in Milan, Italy and received her education in England. She moved to Canada and joined the Ontario Association of Architects, becoming involved in the preservation of historic buildings in Kingston, Ontario. Inglis was also a member of Royal Institute of British Architects (1953) and Royal Architectural Institute of Canada (1985). She was a partner in Inglis and Downey Architects, Inc. She made a strong name for herself by proving to clients that even as a woman she was able to solve complex issues. This increased her creditability within the architectural field.

== Life and career ==
Inglis was raised as a child in Milan, Italy, where she became interested in architecture. Illness forced her to stay in her room, which helped her find her passion for drawing and constructing 3-D miniature buildings from paper. At age 12, her parents sent her to England (in order to protect her from the Nazis), and she attended a British boarding school. Eventually she would go on to be an apprentice, at the age of 18, in Cheltenham before attending the University of Edinburgh for architecture. Inglis received a traveling scholarship, allowing her to study post-war architecture in Europe and North America. Her interest in landscape design encouraged her to gain a certificate from University College London, England in 1957 for this field. After moving to Kingston, Ontario, architect Wilfred Sorensen provided her with practical training between 1962 and 1963.

In 1953, she married Edinburgh James Inglis (psychologist), lasting 45 years. In London, she started her own architectural firm and practiced there for six years. In 1959, Inglis and her husband moved to Kingston, Ontario after James received a teaching job opportunity from Queen's University at Kingston. Her an her husband had two daughters, Jane and Kate. She produced work from home, while also having to care for her two daughters, until 1984. After this point, she created a firm alongside architect Bruce Downey called Inglis & Downey Architects, who was a previous Carleton University graduate. The two became knowledgeable in redesigning group homes to create barrier-free accessible areas. There, she found inspiration in the stone architecture of the city and decided to explore building preservation by utilizing the stone style of Kingston in her own designs, paying homage. She also worked to redesign heritage buildings for contemporary use and conservation. Some of her notable projects include the Kingston Public Library, Chez Piggy restaurant, the Kingston Brew Pub and the Wolfe Island ferry terminal. Inglis also gained connections with Margaret Angus, who was a historian and author. Together, they worked to give Kingston heritage buildings a voice when they were being threatened with demolition. Instead, they were advocating for preservation which went against the typical practice occurring within the city. This caused the city to create "The City of Kingston Act, 1970", recognizing the heritage value of buildings in Kingston. Overall, the quote "my pleasure is in seeing people enjoying places I have helped to make" by Inglis describes her main focus when designing.

Inglis was known by the community as a social activist who fought for children and homeless rights. With her passion for Kingston's social welfare, a shelter was renamed Lily's Place in 2012. The address of this family-oriented shelter is 333 Kingscourt Ave, Kingston, Ontario.

Inglis died from cancer on 11 January 2010.

== Projects ==
This is an incomplete list of projects. Most if not all of these projects are restoration, renovation, heritage conservation projects or additions to preexisting buildings:

=== Notable ===
- Wolf Island Ferry Terminal- Kingston, Ontario (n.d. completed)
- Kingston Co-op Nursery School- St. Paul's, Kingston, Ontario (1965 completed)
- Notre Dame Convent Project (Kingston Public Library and Senior Housing Project)- Kingston, Ontario (1972 completed)
- Newcourt House (St. Lawrence College Campus)- Kingston, Ontario (1973 completed)
- Chalmers Green Playground- Kingston, Ontario (1975 completed)
- 1 King Street West (Newlands Pavilion)- Kingston, Ontario (1979 completed)
- Cataraqui Cemetery Crematorium renovation- Kingston Ontario (1979 completed)
- Kingston Frontenac Public Library- Kingston, Ontario (1978 completed), her first large scale building project
- Old Kingston Post Office- 86 Clarence Street, Kingston, Ontario (1979 completed)
- Chez Piggy's Restaurant- Kingston Ontario (n.d. completed)
- Finlay Winston Apartments- Kingston Ontario (1983 completed)
- Market Square, Kingston, A Heritage Conservation District Study by Dr. Harold Kalman and Lily Inglis- Kingston Ontario (1985 completed)
- Cornwall Churches (ACO - Architectural Conservancy of Ontario)- Kingston Ontario (1990 completed)
- Barnum House County Museum (Ontario Heritage Foundation OHF)- Kingston Ontario (1992 completed)

=== Other ===
- Arthur, Drs. A.J.- 38 Stormont Ave., Kingston, Ontario (n.d. completed)
- Baum, Mr. And Mrs. C.- 30 Bracknell Gardens, London, UK (n.d. completed)
- Briggs, Dr. and Mrs. Bob- 49 Dickens Drive, Kingston, Ontario (n.d. completed)
- L'Eglise St. Francoise D'Assise- 512 Frontenac Street, Kingston, Ontario (1960 completed)
- Fulford, Mrs. Josephine - 65 Gore Street, Kingston, Ontario (1965 completed)
- Murphy's Seafood- 70 Brock Street, Kingston, Ontario (1965 completed)
- Boswell, Mrs. Merice re: Boswell's Book Bell and Candle- 73 Brock Street, Kingston, Ontario (1970 completed)
- Campbell, Dr. and Mrs. Dougal - 33 Hill Street, Kingston, Ontario (1970 completed)
- Easton, Mrs. Willie- 82 Earl Street, Kingston, Ontario (1971 completed)
- Kingston Day Care Centre- Kingston, Ontario (1972 completed)
- Frontenac Hotel- Kingston, Ontario (1973 completed)
- 34-40 Clarence Street, Kingston, Ontario (1983 completed)
- Hamilton Residence- 203 King Street East, Kingston, Ontario (1983 completed)

== Writings ==
- Inglis, Lily. With Our Past before Us: Nineteenth-Century Architecture in the Kingston Area. (book review) Ontario History 89.3 (1997): 247-248.
- Inglis, Lily and James Inglis. "Letter to the Editor: Save the Heritage." Globe and Mail (Toronto) 8 Mar. 1988: A6.

== Notable awards ==
- Fellow, Royal Architectural Institute of Canada
- Livable City Design Award, City of Kingston, 2001
- Life-time Achievement Award, Frontenac Historic Foundation Award Program, 2002
- Honorary diploma from St. Lawrence College
