= William E. Blatz =

German-Canadian psychologist (1895–1964)

- Dr. Blatz with a young child, 1961
- Born: William Emet Blatz; June 30, 1895; Hamilton, Ontario, Canada
- Died: November 1, 1964 (aged 69); Toronto, Ontario, Canada
- Education: University of Toronto (BA, MA, MB); University of Chicago (Ph.D)
- Known for: Security theory
- Spouses: Margery Rowland (m. 1922; div. 1943) Annie Louisa Barnard Harris (m. 1946; died 1964)
- Children: 1
- Scientific career
- Fields: Psychology (developmental)
- Thesis: A Psychological Study of the Emotion of Fear (1924)
- Doctoral advisor: Harvey A. Carr
- Doctoral students: Mary Ainsworth

William Emet Blatz (/ˈblæts/; June 30, 1895 – November 1, 1964) was a German-Canadian developmental psychologist who was director of the University of Toronto's Institute of Child Study from 1925 until his retirement in 1960. He authored numerous books and was known for his creation of security theory, a precursor to attachment theory.

Blatz's theory posited that in infancy and early childhood, the child needs to create a secure base with its caregivers in order to gain the courage necessary to brave the insecurity implicit in exploring the world, and argued that a lack of psychological resilience and self-confidence in adulthood are born out of a failure to develop a secure base in childhood.

== Biography ==
William Emet Blatz was born in Hamilton, Ontario on June 30, 1895, to German parents. His father, Leo Victor Blatz, had moved to Canada from Würzburg in 1868, while his mother, Victoria Mary Mesmer—a relation to Franz Mesmer, arrived from Mainz in 1870. They married in Hamilton, Ontario in 1871, and William Emet was the youngest of nine children in the family.

Victoria was driven and intelligent, put an emphasis on academic endeavor and "assumed all her children would do well in school." Blatz did do well in school, and received his BA in physiology in 1916 from the University of Toronto. He earned his MA the following year, then attempted to join the Canadian Armed Forces but was rejected due to his German lineage and instead returned to the University of Toronto to treat shell shocked veterans along with Dr. Edward A. Bott. After the war, he began studying medicine, and graduated in 1921 with a BM from the University of Toronto. He then received a scholarship at the University of Chicago, where he met his first wife Margery Rowland and received his Ph.D in psychology under the tutelage of Harvey A. Carr in 1924.

While in Chicago, he designed an electrically operated collapsible chair with which he attempted to measure human emotions. He would attach electrodes, connected to an electrocardiograph, to an unsuspecting volunteer and then seat them in the chair. In the course of a polite conversation, Blatz would press a button causing the chair to collapse and the volunteer would fall to the floor onto the base of their spine. The electrocardiograph then measured the volunteer's emotions through the change in heartbeat and other physical reactions. On several occasions, Blatz had been forced to flee the room when his subjects lost their tempers.

Blatz was then recalled to the University of Toronto by Dr. Edward A. Bott and Dr. Clarence M. Hincks to head the university's Institute of Child Study, and became assistant professor of the university's psychology department. He also traveled throughout the United States, visiting nurseries, and became research director of the Canadian National Committee for Mental Hygiene. In 1927, he was appointed consultant psychologist to the Toronto Juvenile Court.

In 1935, he was appointed educational consultant to the Dionne quintuplets, and supervised their development until 1938. In 1941, he was in England with Clarence M. Hincks to survey the need for child welfare in war-time. As a result of a discussion with the British Ministry of Health, Blatz returned to England in 1942 with five staff psychologists to set up the Garrison Lane Nursery Training Centre in Birmingham, which served as a model nursery school for the training of day care workers. In 1946, he advised the Canadian Government to set standards and regulations for nurseries, and married his second wife, Annie Louisa Barnard Harris.

In 1960, Blatz retired as director of the Institute of Child Study and in 1963 retired as professor of psychology at the University of Toronto. In 1964, he completed a draft of Human Security: Some Reflections and on November 1, died in Toronto at the age of 69. He was survived by his wife, Annie, his daughter, Margery Elsie Blatz, and his grandchildren, Jeffrey and James.

== Works ==
Blatz rejected Freudian theories of psychology; he asserted that "it is not necessary to postulate an unconscious." During his academic career, he also stated that some children might be better educated by studying music rather than reading, writing and arithmetic and defended the practice of teaching children to believe in Santa Claus.

Security theory

Blatz postulated security as the primary goal of the human being, but conceptualized security not as safety—a static state that is subject to crisis and hence an insecure state—but as a dynamic state. Security was for him a state of mind, characterized by serenity, which grew out of trust in one's ability to deal with the future. He stated it was a state of mind that accompanies a willingness to accept the consequences of one's decisions, and argued that security was acquired through early experience.

According to Blatz's security theory, children initially need to develop a feeling of complete trust in their caregivers—dependent security. This secure base gives them the courage to explore, take risks, learn and eventually develop trust in themselves—independent security. Thus, Blatz's security theory was aimed at emancipation and the development of responsibility; it emphasized the importance of gradually increasing the child's freedom to make decisions independently, to experience consequences—both successes and failures, and to acquire effective ways of coping with those consequences. Due to the general similarities between the theories in addition to Blatz's role as Mary Ainsworth's doctoral advisor, security theory can be seen as a precursor to attachment theory.

== Bibliography ==
- A Psychological Study of the Emotion of Fear. (1924). Chicago: University of Chicago, Department of Psychology.
- The Five Sisters: A Study in Child Psychology. (1938). New York: Morrow.
- Hostages to Peace: Parents and the Children of Democracy. (1940). New York: Morrow.
- Understanding the Young Child. (1944). Toronto: Clarke, Irwin.
- Twenty-Five Years of Child Study, 1926-1951. (1951). Toronto: University of Toronto Press.
- Human Security: Some Reflections. (1966). Toronto: University of Toronto Press.
