= John D. Ketchum =

Canadian psychologist (1893–1962)

John Davidson Ketchum
- Born: 1893
- Died: 1962 (aged 68–69)
- Education: University of Toronto
- Scientific career
- Fields: Social psychology
- Workplaces: University of Toronto
- Thesis: University of Toronto (University of Toronto)

John Davidson Ketchum (1893–1962) was a Canadian psychologist, author, and professor at the University of Toronto.

== Career ==
John Davidson Ketchum was born in 1893. He was originally planning to become a musician but the outbreak of the First World War changed his plans.

Ketchum was interned in the Ruhleben internment camp in Germany about which he later wrote in his book Ruhleben: A Prison Camp Society, published in 1965 after his death. He recalled that the prisoners were "almost a cross-section of British society, from the manor house to the slum; scarcely a trade or profession was unrepresented. All were jammed together in a small stableyard—company directors and seamen, concert musicians and factory workers, science professors and jockeys. Few had ever met previously; their only common bond was their British citizenship" (Ketchum, p. 2).

He was active in the Canadian Psychological Association of which he became president in 1951.

He died in 1962. His records are kept in the University of Toronto Archives.

== Publications ==
- Ketchum, J.D. (1965). Ruhleben: A Prison Camp Society

== Positions ==
- President, Canadian Psychological Association (1951)

== Heritage ==
The department of psychology at the University of Toronto awards annually the J. Davidson Ketchum Graduate Award and Graduate Scholarship, which were established by his children, Dr. Edward J.D. Ketchum and Margaret (Ketchum) Catto, and her husband Col. John Catto, in the years after Davidson's death.
