= Virginia Douglas =

Canadian psychologist

Virginia I. Douglas
- Born: January 28, 1927; London, Ontario
- Died: December 8, 2017 (aged 90); Halifax, Nova Scotia
- Known for: Research on attention deficit hyperactivity disorder
- Title: Professor Emerita

Academic background
- Education: Queen's University at Kingston; University of Michigan
- Thesis: The Development Of Two Families Of Defense (1959)

Academic work
- Discipline: Psychology
- Institutions: McGill University

Virginia I. Douglas (January 28, 1927 – December 8, 2017) was a Canadian psychologist. She was a professor at McGill University in Montreal, Canada, noted for her contributions to the study of attention deficit hyperactivity disorder (ADHD).

== Biography ==
Douglas was born in London, Ontario to a Scottish family. She completed a Bachelor of Arts degree at Queen's University in 1948. Douglas then attended the University of Michigan, where she completed two master's degrees: one in social work (in 1955) and the other in psychology (in 1956). She earned her PhD in psychology from the University of Michigan in 1958.

Douglas joined the faculty at McGill University in 1958. She played an influential role in expanding the program from a terminal Master's degree program to a PhD program based on the scientist-practitioner model. Douglas remained at McGill until her retirement in 2015.

Douglas served as president of the Canadian Psychological Association (CPA) in 1971. She was awarded CPA's Gold Medal for Distinguished Lifetime Contributions to Canadian Psychology in 2004.

Douglas died on December 8, 2017, at her home in Halifax, Nova Scotia, at the age of 90.

== Research ==
During graduate school, Douglas's research interests focused on defense mechanisms in adults. However, after moving to Montreal to take a position as a professor at McGill University, she was required to complete a clinical workshop at the Montreal Children's Hospital. Influenced by this workshop, her research interests shifted to the study of ADHD, which was, at the time, referred to as hyperkinesis.

In 1971, in a Presidential Address to the Canadian Psychological Association, Douglas presented her theory that deficits in sustained attention and impulse control were more likely to account for the difficulties of children with hyperkinesis than hyperactivity. Based on her research at the Montreal Children’s Hospital, Douglas argued that children with the disorder experienced deficits in sustained attention that could even emerge under conditions where no distractions existed. Douglas’s research and ideas were published the following year in the seminal article Stop, look and listen: The problem of sustained attention and impulse control in hyperactive and normal children. This paper became the most cited in the field and shifted the focus of hyperkinesis research from hyperactivity to attentional problems.

Previous to Douglas’ 1972 article Stop, look and listen: The problem of sustained attention and impulse control in hyperactive and normal children, ADHD was referred to as hyperkinesis. It was widely believed that hyperactivity, not attentional problems, was the main factor underlying this disorder. As a result of Douglas’s research, attention deficit disorder (ADD) with or without hyperactivity was included in the third edition of the Diagnostic and Statistical Manual of Mental Disorders (DSM-III).

Douglas's research on ADHD expanded to the areas of learning, perception, cognition, memory, and neuropsychology. Following her paper, “Stop, look, and listen”, Douglas proposed a three-component model of self-regulation to explain the cognitive and motor deficits associated with ADHD. The three components were attentional, inhibitory, and strategic or organizational. Douglas theorized that deficits in any one of these components might contribute to the difficulties experienced by individuals with ADHD.

- Attentional: effortful attention
- Inhibitory: control of impulsive, inappropriate responding
- Strategic (organizational): processes that guide and direct cognitive processing

Douglas emphasized the importance of correctly identifying which of the three components underlies symptom-related behaviour in any given individual with ADHD. For example, performance failure may be falsely attributed to executive problems (e.g. working memory) when the fundamental problem is a deficit in attention (e.g. the effortful aspect of cognitive processing) or inhibitory control (e.g. the inability to inhibit a prepotent response). Douglas also pushed for the use of rigorous, laboratory-based measures to identify specific deficits in the three self-regulatory components.

Douglas’s later research focused on pharmacotherapy, and, more specifically, on the effects of methylphenidate on task performance, impulsivity, cognitive training, and reinforcement in children with ADHD.

== Awards ==
- 2004 - CPA Gold Medal for Distinguished Lifetime Contributions to Canadian Psychology
- 1996 - Children and Adults with Attention-Deficit/Hyperactivity Disorder (CHADD) Award in Recognition of Outstanding Professional Achievements in the Field of Attention Deficit Disorder
- 1990 - American Psychological Association Section on Child Clinical Psychology's Distinguished Contribution Award
- 1980 - CPA Award for Distinguished Contributions to Psychology as a Profession (first recipient of this award)
- 1977 - Canadian Silver Jubilee Medal

== Selected works ==
- Douglas, V. I. (2005). Cognitive deficits in children with Attention Deficit Hyperactivity Disorder: A long-term follow-up. Canadian Psychology, 46, 23-31. doi:10.1037/h0085821
- Douglas, V. I. (1999). Cognitive control processes in Attention-Deficit Hyperactivity Disorder. In H. C. Quay, & A. E. Hogan (Eds.), Handbook of disruptive behavior disorders (pp. 105–138). New York: Plenum.
- Berman, T., Douglas, V.I., & Barr, R.G. (1998). Effects of Methylphenidate on complex cognitive processing in Attention-Deficit Hyperactivity Disorder. Journal of Abnormal Psychology, 108, 90-105. doi:10.1037/0021-843X.108.1.90
- Douglas, V. I., Parry, P., Marton, P., & Garson, C. (1976). Assessment of a cognitive training program for hyperactive children. Journal of Abnormal Child Psychology, 4, 389-410. doi:10.1007/BF00922535
- Douglas, V. I. (1972). Stop, look, and listen! The problem of sustained attention and impulse control in hyperactive and normal children. Canadian Journal of Behavioural Science, 4, 259-282. doi:10.1037/h0082313
