= Raymond G. Berry =

Canadian psychologist

Raymond Grant Berry
- Born: Raymond Grant Berry; 15 May 1925
- Died: 15 November 2010 (aged 85); Saanichton, British Columbia
- Education: University of Toronto
- Scientific career
- Fields: clinical psychology
- Thesis: A study of the ability of psychotic patients to discriminate color mass (1952)

Raymond Grant Berry (1925-2010) was a clinical psychologist who played a prominent role in the establishment of psychology as a discipline and profession in Canada.

== Early life and education ==
MacDonald was born in 1925. He studied at the University of Toronto from which he earned a PhD in psychology.

== Career ==
MacDonald played a very active role in the developing the Ontario Psychological Association. He also became involved in the Canadian Psychological Association.

== Awards and honours ==
- Honorary Life Fellow, Canadian Psychological Association
- 1986: CPA Award for Distinguished Contributions to Psychology as a Profession, Canadian Psychological Association
- 1977: President, Canadian Psychological Association
- 1974-1976: Registrar, Ontario Board of Examiners in Psychology
