= Karl S. Bernhardt =

Canadian psychologist (1901-1967)

Karl Schofield Bernhardt
- Born: Karl S. Bernhardt; 1901
- Died: 1967 (aged 65–66)
- Scientific career
- Fields: Child Psychology
- Institutions: University of Toronto

Karl S. Bernhardt (1901–1967) was a Canadian psychologist and early researcher in child psychology.

== Career ==
Karl S. Bernhardt was born in 1901. He was initially educated at Orillia Collegiate in Orillia, Ontario. He then enrolled at the University of Toronto from which he graduated with a B.A. in 1926 followed an M.A. in 1929. He proceeded to the University of Chicago from which he obtained a Ph.D. in 1933.

He joined the faculty of the University of Toronto where he became Professor of Psychology (1943–1964). He was also assistant director (1936–1960) and then director of the Institute of Child Study (1960–1964) at the university. He retired in 1964 and was named professor emeritus and director emeritus.

His papers are held in the University of Toronto archive.

Each year, the Department of Psychology at Carleton University awards the Karl S. Bernhardt Scholarship to the best student entering the Fourth year of the Honours Psychology program.

== Positions ==
- President, Canadian Psychological Association (1947)

== Publications ==
- Bernhardt, K.S. (1934). An Introduction to Psychology
- Bernhardt, K.S. (1937). An Analysis of the Social Contacts of Preschool Children with the Aid of Motion Pictures
- Bernhardt, K.S. (1942). Basic Principles of Pre-school Education
- Bernhardt, K.S. (1943). Elementary Psychology
- Bernhardt, K.S. (1956). Making the Most of Your College Career; Helpful Suggestions for College Students
- Bernhardt, K.S. (1961). Training for Research in Psychology
- Bernhardt, K.S. (1970). Being a Parent; Unchanging Values in a Changing World
