= Nelson W. Morton =

Canadian psychologist (1910–1976)

Nelson Whitman Morton
- Born: 1910
- Died: 1976 (aged 65–66)

Academic background
- Education: McGill University
- Thesis: The industrial quality of the unemployed : with particular reference to occupational classification (1933)
- Doctoral advisor: Chester E. Kellogg

Academic work
- Institutions: McGill University

Nelson Whitman Morton (1910–1976) was a Canadian psychologist who had a reputation for his research in cognitive and applied psychology and in the organisation of psychologists in Canada.

== Academic career ==
Morton obtained his MSc from McGill University in 1931 followed by his PhD 1933. His MSc thesis was entitled The subject of evidence and was a historical overview of the development of certain concepts in psychological research. The thesis was supervised by William Dunlop Tait who was head of the department at McGill. The topic of his PhD dissertation was occupational psychology with a particular focus on assessing what what he described as the industrial quality of the unemployed. His work was supervised by Chester Kellogg who was known for his work on the construction of psychological tests.

== Research ==
His applied research focused on the application of psychology to military affairs. This formed the focus of his presidential address to the Canadian Psychological Association in 1952. He also sat on the government Defence Research Board.

== Honours and awards ==
- Honorary President of the Canadian Psychological Association (1952–1953)
