= James Inglis (psychologist) =

Canadian psychologist (died 1999)

- Born: James Inglis
- Died: 1999; Kingston, Ontario

Academic background
- Education: University of London
- Thesis: The scientific study of abnormal behavior : experimental and clinical research (DSc) (1971)

Academic work
- Discipline: Psychology
- Sub-discipline: Clinical psychology
- Institutions: Queen's University at Kingston

James Inglis was a British/Canadian psychologist.

== Career ==
Inglis trained in clinical psychology in Scotland, where he met and married the architect Lily Inglis. They moved to Canada in 1959, where James Inglis joined the faculty at Queen's University at Kingston. He co-founded the clinical programme in the department of psychology.

He received his DSc in psychology from the University of London in 1971.

He was active in the Canadian Psychological Association, of which he became president in 1979.

== Heritage ==
Queen's University established the James Inglis Prize, awarded annually to a graduating doctoral student with highest standing in the clinical programme.

== Positions ==
- President, Canadian Psychological Association (1979)
- Honorary Life Fellow, Canadian Psychological Association

== Publications ==
- Inglis, J., & Lawson, J.S. (1986). A Principal Components Analysis of the Kaufman Assessment Battery for Children (K-ABC): Implications for the Test Results of Children with Learning Disabilities. Journal of Learning Disabilities, 19(2), 80–85.
- Nichols, E.G., Inglis, J., Lawson, J.S., & MacKay, I. (1988). A Cross-Validation Study of Patterns of Cognitive Ability in Children with Learning Difficulties, as Described by Factorially Defined WISC-R Verbal and Performance IQs. Journal of Learning Disabilities, 21(8), 504–508.
- Inglis J, Caird WK (1963) Age differences in successive responses to simultaneous stimulation. Canadian Journal of Psychology, 17: 98–105
- Inglis J, Sanderson RE (1961) Successive responses to simultaneous stimulation in elderly patients with memory disorder. Journal of Abnormal & Social Psychology, 62: 709–712
- Lawson, J.S., & Inglis, J. (1984). The Psychometric Assessment of Children with Learning Disabilities: An Index Derived from a Principal Components Analysis of the WISC-R. Journal of Learning Disabilities, 17(9),517-555.
