= Bott Hypothesis =

The Bott Hypothesis is a thesis first advanced in Elizabeth Bott's Family and Social Networks (1957), one of the most influential works published in the sociology of the family. Elizabeth Bott's hypothesis holds that the connectedness or the density of a husband's and wife's separate social networks is positively associated with marital role segregation.

== Family Structure and Social Networks ==
In her Family and Social Network (1957), Elizabeth Bott argued that conjugal role performance is related to the density of each spouse's social networks outside the nuclear family. The data Bott used to develop this hypothesis were drawn from the study of 20 working-class, London families.

Thus, according to Bott:

"When many of the people a person knows interact with one another, that is when the person's network is close knit, the members of his network tend to reach consensus on norms and they exert consistent informal pressure on one another to conform to the norms, to keep in touch with one another, and, if need be, to help one another. If both husband and wife come to marriage with such close knit networks, and if conditions are such that the previous pattern of relationships is continued, the marriage will be superimposed on these pre-existing relationships, and both spouses will continue to be drawn into activities with people outside their own elementary family (family of procreation). Each will get some emotional satisfaction from these external relationships and will likely demand correspondingly less of the spouse. Rigid segregation of roles will be possible because each spouse can get help from other people."

— Elizabeth Bott, Family and Social Network. 1971 (2nd ed.). (Originally published, 1957). New York:Free Press.

In other words, what she claimed is that if family members maintain ties with a network of friends or neighbors who know one another and interact apart from the family members, the members of these external social networks can develop norm consensus and exert pressure on the network's members. When members of close-knit networks marry and when they continue to be drawn into network activities after marriage, they can develop a clearly differentiated conjugal role organization of tasks. The external close-knit networks provide the spouses with instrumental assistance and emotional support outside the couple and they, thus, lessen conjugal interdependence and make for a segregated role organization.

== Corollary hypotheses ==
To support her main hypothesis, Bott also offered three corollary hypotheses:

- The Class Principle. The more segregated the role-relationship, the more likely spouses are to have working-class status and less formal education. (For Bott, working class status was a necessary, but not a sufficient condition for segregated role performance)
- The Composition Principle. The more segregated the role-relationship, the more likely females are to have locally concentrated relatives in their network and the more likely males are to have locally concentrated male friends in their network.
- The Residential Principle. The more segregated the role-relationship, the more likely couples are to have a stable residence pattern. Conversely, the more joint the role relationship, the more likely spouses are to have a mobile residence pattern.

Considered by some as one of the predecessors of network science, Bott recognized the fact that, although important, individual attributes cannot explain all the variations in family relations. Instead, she claimed that the social environment which can be visualized as a network rather than as a group can affect conjugal roles. In particular, the density of a network (the proportion of individuals with direct ties to each other) facilitates the emergence of common norms and social support making husbands and wives less likely to invest in each other.

== Further research ==
=== Udry and Hall (1965) ===
Udry and Hall (1965) tested the Bott hypothesis by using a sample of 43 middle-aged, middle-class couples, and the four people each spouse indicated most frequent contact with. However, they did not find a clear-cut relationship between role segregation and network connectedness (measured by asking members of each spouse's network how well they knew each other). Thus, they conclude that Bott's hypothesis may apply only to lower-class couples, or perhaps to middle-class couples at a particular point in the life cycle.

=== Joel Nelson (1966) ===
Joel Nelson (1966) used a sample of 131 working-class women in New Haven and asked the women to list the four people they interacted with most frequently and how often they saw at least two of them at the same time. He introduced the term "clique" contacts for those who had interactions of the latter type at least once a week. Analyzing the influence of the closeness of clique relationships on members' attitudes toward marriage on a traditionalism-modernism dimension, he found the first to be related to marital traditionalism, though not strongly. Thus, women with "clique" relationships were found to have more traditional marital expectations and attitudes than their counterparts whose network contacts were more "individualistic".

=== Aldous and Straus (1966) ===
Aldous and Straus (1966) studied 391 married women living on farms and in towns of at least 2,500 inhabitants. The town group was separated into those with blue and white-collar husbands and the respondents were asked to name the eight women they socialized with most frequently and how many of the eight knew each other in order to measure network closure. Besides network connectedness, several other indexes were devised for measuring task differentiation, sex role activities and power. Although the data failed to confirm the Bott hypothesis, Aldous and Straus note that their sample may have been problematic since there was little variation in network connectedness, they did not know if the wives' social networks were developed before of after their marriages, and there was no data concerning the husbands' social networks.

=== Alexandra Maryansky and Masako Ishii-Kuntz (1991) ===
Alexandra Maryansky and Masako Ishii-Kuntz (1991) find evidence that supports Elizabeth Bott's hypothesis by applying it to a review of social relations among representative species from seven genera of Old World primates. After formalizing and stating Bott's theory more abstractly they highlight three phenomena concerning the effect of social networks:

- the negative causal effect of network overlap on density of each actor's networks;
- the positive causal effect of network density on the degree of social support provided by, and a normative elaboration of, each actor's networks;
- the causal effect of social support and normative elaboration on the segregation of each actor's activities.
