= Jullian M. Blackburn =

Canadian psychologist

Julian M. Blackburn
- Born: Julian Murray Blackburn; 1903
- Died: September 1974 (aged 70–71)
- Education: London School of Economics, University of Cambridge
- Awards: Fellow, Canadian Psychological Association
- Scientific career
- Fields: psychology
- Thesis: An analysis of learning curves and of factors in economical learning (1933)

Julian Murray Blackburn (1903–1974) was a psychologist who played a prominent role in the establishment of psychology as a discipline in Canada.

== Academic career ==
He was born in Hove, England, in 1903 and attended Winchester College before proceeding to the London School of Economics (B.Sc. Econ., 1928) and then the University of Cambridge (Ph.D., 1933). At Cambridge he worked under Frederic Bartlett. After graduation he gained a Rockefeller Fellowship at Yale University (1933–34) and then returned to England where he was employed by the Medical Research Council and as a clinical psychologist at the Maudsley Hospital (1935–1938). He was appointed Lecturer in Social Psychology at the London School of Economics in 1939 and remained there until he emigrated to Canada in 1948. He worked for a year at McGill University before he was appointed Chair of Psychology at Queen's University at Kingston. In 1965, he became become the first Chairman of the Department of Psychology at Trent University from which he retired in 1973. He died in September, 1974. In 1975, the Julian Blackburn College of Part-Time Studies was established at Trent University.

== Research ==
Blackburn conducted research into personality and intelligence.

== Professional ==
Blackburn played a very active role in the developing the Canadian Psychological Association. He was President of the Association in 1957.Editor of the Canadian Journal of Psychology from 1959 to 1965, and served on many national and provincial committees.

== Publications ==
- Blackburn, J. (1945). Psychology and the Social Pattern. Abingdon: Routledge.
- Blackburn, J. (1947). The Framework of Human Behaviour. London, K. Paul, Trench, Trubner.
