= William R.N. Blair =

Canadian psychologist

William Robert Nelson Blair
- Born: 22 March 1915; Millbank, Ontario
- Died: 22 August 1990 (aged 75); Calgary, Alberta
- Education: University of Alberta; University of Ottawa
- Scientific career
- Workplaces: University of Calgary
- Thesis: The prediction of military delinquency (1956)

William Robert Nelson "Buck" Blair (22 March 1915 – 22 August 1990) was a Canadian psychologist and academic administrator.

== Biography ==
Blair was born in Millbank, Ontario. He received a BA and MA in psychology from the University of Alberta. During World War II, he enlisted in the Canadian army and for a period served as a gunner lieutenant. He then moved to the army's Directorate of Personnel Selection and during the 1950s worked in the Canadian Army Personnel System. He returned to academia and obtained a PhD from the University of Ottawa in 1956. He then joined the faculty at the University of Calgary where he was Head of the Department of Psychology from 1966 to 1974 and associate vice-president (academic) of the university from 1974 to 1978. He retired in 1980.

He served extensively on national, regional and international organizations of psychology.

He died in 1990 in Calgary.

== Positions ==
- 1966: President, Canadian Psychological Association

== Awards ==
- 1989 - Honorary Doctor of Military Science, Royal Roads Military College
