= Sperrin N.F. Chant =

Canadian psychologist (1897–1987)

Sperrin Noah Fulton Chant
- Born: Sperrin Noah Fulton Chant; 1897; St. Thomas, Ontario
- Died: 1987 (aged 89–90)
- Education: University of Toronto
- Scientific career
- Fields: Psychology
- Workplaces: University of Toronto; University of British Columbia

Sperrin Noah Fulton Chant (1897–1987) was a Canadian psychologist.

== Career ==
Chant was born in St. Thomas, Ontario, in 1897. After high school he enlisted in the army at the time of the First World War. Afterwards, he enrolled at the University of Toronto, from which he obtained a B.A. in 1922 followed by an M.A. in 1924. He then became a psychology professor at the University of Toronto, where he worked with M.D. Salter/Mary Ainsworth. He then was appointed head of the department of philosophy and psychology at the University of British Columbia. At the outbreak of the Second World War, he joined the Royal Canadian Air Force from 1941 to 1944. In 1945 he returned to the University of British Columbia, where he became dean of the Faculty of Arts and Science (1948–1964).

Chant was actively involved in the reform of post-secondary education in British Columbia for which he chaired a Royal Commission on Education. The final report, named the Chant Report was published in 1961. He was also active in the Canadian Psychological Association, of which he became president in 1948.

== Publications ==
- Chant, S.N.F. (1937). Mental training; a practical psychology.
- Chant, S. N. F. & Salter, M.D. (1937). The measurement of attitude toward war and the galvanic skin response. Journal of Educational Psychology, 28, 281-289
- Blatz, W. E., Chant, S. N. F., & Salter, M. D. (1937) Emotional episodes in the child of school age. University of Toronto Studies Child Development Series, No.9. Toronto: University of Toronto Press.

== Positions ==
- President, Canadian Psychological Association (1948)
