= Joseph S.A. Bois =

Canadian psychologist

Joseph S. Bois
- Born: Joseph Samuel Bois; 1895
- Died: 1978 (aged 82–83)
- Education: Laval University, McGill University
- Scientific career
- Fields: psychology
- Thesis: Some objective aspects of temperament (1934)

Joseph Samuel Bois (1892–1978) was a Canadian priest, psychologist, and epistemologist who contributed substantially to the development of psychology in Canada.

== Career ==
Bois was born in a log cabin in the small settlement of Stratford, Quebec. He attended Laval University where he received his BA. He then trained as a priest and worked in Quebec founding trade unions and agitating for workers' rights. He then moved to California where he continued this work with Mexican and indigenous people. His fourteen years as a priest activist brought him to the attention of the church bureaucracy. He was summoned to Rome and released from the Church.

He returned to Canada and gained a PhD in psychology from McGill University in Montreal. He then formed with a colleague a psychological consulting service. He continued writing and contributed a weekly column to a political and literary journal, a monthly column to a medical journal, and three books in French.

With the outbreak of the Second World War he enlisted in the Canadian Army. He was appointed Lieutenant Colonel in charge of research and information in the National Defence Headquarters in Ottawa.

After the war he moved into industrial psychology and developed a management training programme called Executive Methods.

In 1956 he retired and returned to Southern California, where he served as director of research and education at the Viewpoints Institute, a center for general semantics study in Los Angeles. He died in 1978.

== Research ==
His main innovation was his work in the field known as general semantics. He was greatly influenced by the work of Alfred Korzybski who developed this field of general semantics which is concerned with how we experience the world. Korzybski had established the Institute of General Semantics. Bois became a Vice President and Trustee of the Institute and was active in the International Society for General Semantics.

== Professional ==
Bois played a very active role in the developing the Canadian Psychological Association and in developing the guidelines for the certification of psychologists. He was President of the Association in 1949.

== Publications ==
- Bois, J.S. (1972). "Epistemics: The Science-Art of Innovating". International Society of General Semantics.
- Bois, J.S. (1969). "Breeds of Men: Towards the Adulthood of Humankind". New York: Harper and Row.
- Bois, J.S. (1968). "Communication as Creative Experience". Viewpoints.
- Bois, J.S. (1966). "The Art of Awareness: A Handbook on Epistemics and General Semantics". W.C. Brown.
- Bois, J.S. (1957). "Explorations in Awareness". Harper.
