= David Gibson (psychologist) =

Canadian psychologist

- Born: David Gibson; 1926
- Died: 2006 (aged 79–80)
- Education: University of Toronto
- Scientific career
- Fields: clinical psychology
- Workplaces: University of Calgary
- Thesis: Re-examination of the Thurstone and Chave method of measuring attitudes (1952)

David Gibson (1926–2006) was a clinical psychologist who played a prominent role in the establishment of psychology as a discipline in Canada.

== Career ==
Gibson was born in 1926, and grew up in Toronto. During the Second World War, he joined the Canadian Army. After the war, he returned to the University of Toronto from which he earned a PhD in psychology. He then became chief psychologist at the hospital in Smiths Falls, Ontario. He then moved to Alberta where he took up an academic post at the University of Calgary. He co-founded and directed the Vocational Research & Rehabilitation Institute. He retired in 1988 and died in 2006.

== Research ==
Gibson's research was largely concerned with aspects of Intellectual disability which is known as general learning disability in the United Kingdom and formerly mental retardation in North America. (Note: e.g., Gibson, 1978, 1974.)

== Professional ==
Gibson played a very active role in the developing the Canadian Psychological Association in which he was President in 1974. He was elected an Honorary Life Fellow of the Association. At the University of Calgary, he contributed to the Blair Report on the training of psychologists. He was editor of the Canadian Psychological Review from 1969 to 1979.

== Publications ==
- Gibson, & Harris, A. (1988). Aggregated early intervention effects for Down's syndrome persons: patterning and longevity of benefits. Journal of Intellectual Disability Research, 32(1), 1-17.
- Gibson, D. (1978). Down's syndrome : the psychology of mongolism. Cambridge University Press.
- Gibson D. (1974). Involuntary Sterilization of the Mentally Retarded: A Western Canadian Phenomenon. Canadian Psychiatric Association Journal, 19(1):59-63.
- Gibson D, Frank HF, Zarfas DE. (1963). Public Mental Retardation Services in Canada: Evolution and Trends. Canadian Psychiatric Association Journal, 8(5):337-343.
- Gibson D. (1963). Euphemistic Nomenclature in Mental Retardation. Canadian Psychiatric Association Journal, 8(5):349-351
