= Canadian Psychological Association =

Canadian organization

- Logo of the CPA
- Formation: 1939
- Headquarters: 141 Laurier Avenue W Ottawa, Ontario, Canada
- Coordinates: 45.42096°N 75.69413°W
- Members: Over 7,000 members and affiliates
- Official language: English, French
- President: Steven M. Smith
- Chief Executive Officer: Lisa Votta-Bleeker
- Website: cpa.ca

The Canadian Psychological Association (CPA) is the primary organization representing psychologists throughout Canada. It was organized in 1939 and incorporated under the Canada Corporations Act, Part II, in May 1950.

Its objectives are to improve the health and welfare of all Canadians; to promote excellence and innovation in psychological research, education, and practice; to promote the advancement, development, dissemination, and application of psychological knowledge; and to provide high-quality services to members.

== History ==
The CPA was founded in a University of Ottawa psychology lab in 1938, although it was not formally organized until 1939. Initially, the CPA's purpose was to help with Canada's contribution to World War II; indeed, the CPA was heavily involved with test construction for the Department of National Defence.

== Organizational structure ==
CPA's head office is located in Ottawa, Ontario. The CPA has a directorate for each of its three pillars – science, practice, and education.

- The Science Directorate's mandate is to lobby government for increased funding for psychological research, promote and support the work of Canadian researchers in psychology, and educate the public about important findings from psychological science.
- The Practice Directorate's mandate is to support and facilitate advocacy for the practice of psychology across Canada.
- The Education Directorate's mandate is to oversee the accreditation of doctoral and internship programmes in professional psychology.

The Board of Directors sets policies that guide the CPA. It is made up of Presidential Officers, Directors, and Executive Officers.

== Membership ==
There are three main grades of membership:

- Member: Masters or Doctoral degree in psychology, or its academic equivalent, conferred by a graduate school of recognized standing. Members must be residents of Canada or the US.
- Fellows: members who have made a distinguished contribution to the advancement of the science or profession of psychology, or who have given exceptional service to their national or provincial associations.
- Honorary Life Fellows/Honorary Life Members: members who are age 70 or higher, who have been regular Members of CPA for at least 25 years.

== Publications ==
The CPA, in partnership with the American Psychological Association, quarterly publishes the following three academic journals:

- Canadian Journal of Behavioural Science
- Canadian Journal of Experimental Psychology
- Canadian Psychology

The CPA also publishes a quarterly magazine called Psynopsis. Issues contain brief articles on specific themes relating to psychology, as well as updates from the head office of CPA, committee news, information about the annual convention, and much more.

Mind Pad is a professional newsletter that is written and reviewed by student affiliates of the Canadian Psychological Association. The newsletter is published biannually online.

== Awards ==
Each year at the annual convention, CPA honors individuals who have made distinguished contributions to psychology in Canada with the following awards:

- CPA Gold Medal Award For Distinguished Lifetime Contributions to Canadian Psychology
- CPA John C. Service Member the Year Award
- CPA Donald O. Hebb Award for Distinguished Contributions to Psychology as a Science
- CPA Award for Distinguished Contributions to Education and Training in Psychology
- CPA Award for Distinguished Contributions to Psychology as a Profession
- CPA Award for Distinguished Contributions to the International Advancement of Psychology
- CPA Award for Distinguished Contributions to Public or Community Service
- Distinguished Practitioner Award
- CPA Award for Distinguished Lifetime Service to the Canadian Psychological Association
- CPA Humanitarian Award
- President's New Researcher Award

The CPA has numerous student awards. As an example, the CPA gives out Certificates of Academic Excellence to students in each Canadian psychology department for the best undergraduate, masters, and doctoral thesis. The sections of CPA also award students for exceptional papers, presentations, and posters at the annual convention.

Fellowships are awarded to members of the CPA who have made distinguished contributions to the advancement of the science or profession of psychology or who have given exceptional service to their national or provincial associations. The Committee on Fellows and Awards review nominations and make recommendations to the Board of Directors who appoint fellows.

== Presidents ==
The following have been Presidents of the Association:

- 1940 – Roy B. Liddy
- 1941 – Edward A. Bott
- 1942 – Edward A. Bott
- 1943 – George Humphrey
- 1944 – George Humphrey
- 1945 – George Humphrey
- 1946 – Roy B. Liddy
- 1947 – Karl S. Bernhardt
- 1948 – Sperrin N.F. Chant
- 1949 – Joseph S.A. Bois
- 1950 – C. Roger Myers
- 1951 – John D. Ketchum
- 1952 – Nelson W. Morton
- 1953 – Donald O. Hebb
- 1954 – David Carlton Williams
- 1955 – Noël Mailloux
- 1956 – George A. Ferguson
- 1957 – Jullian M. Blackburn
- 1958 – William E. Blatz
- 1959 – Dalbir Bindra
- 1960 – Gordon H. Turner
- 1961 – Reg B. Bromiley
- 1962 – Robert B. Malmo
- 1963 – Gordon A. McMurray
- 1964 – Adrien Pinard
- 1965 – P. Lynn Newbigging
- 1966 – William R.N. Blair
- 1967 – David J.L. Bélanger
- 1968 – Wesley H. Coons
- 1969 – Mary J. Wright
- 1970 – Wallace Lambert
- 1971 – Virginia Douglas
- 1972 – Daniel Berlyne
- 1973 – Arthur M. Sullivan
- 1974 – David Gibson
- 1975 – Allan Paivio
- 1976 – Park O. Davidson
- 1977 – Raymond G. Berry
- 1978 – Glenn E. MacDonald
- 1979 – James Inglis
- 1980 – John G. Adair
- 1981 – Vaira Vīķe-Freiberga
- 1982 – Sandra W. Pyke
- 1983 – Terrence P. Hogan
- 1984 – Graham Skanes
- 1985 – Elinor W. Ames
- 1986 – Peter C. Dodwell
- 1987 – Kenneth D. Craig
- 1988 – Paul Gendreau
- 1989 – David R. Olson
- 1990 – Michel Sabourin
- 1991 – J. Conway
- 1992 – Connie Stark-Adamec
- 1993 – Luc Granger
- 1994 – Keith Dobson
- 1995 – Jean Pettifor
- 1996 – David R. Evans
- 1997 – Janel Gauthier
- 1998 – Janel Gauthier
- 1999 – Peter Suedfeld
- 2000 – Gary Latham
- 2001 – James Ogloff
- 2002 – William Melnyk
- 2003 – Abe Ross
- 2004 – Patrick O'Neill
- 2005 – John L. Arnett
- 2006 – Dan Perlman
- 2007 – Robert J. Vallerand
- 2008 – Thomas Hadjistavropoulos
- 2009 – Catherine Lee
- 2010 – Martin Antony
- 2011 – Peter Graf
- 2012 – David Dozois
- 2013 – Jennifer Frain
- 2014 – Wolfgang Linden
- 2015 - Kerry Mothersill
- 2016 – Kevin Kelloway
- 2017 - David Dozois
- 2018 – Patrick Baillie
- 2019 – Sam Mikail
- 2020 – Ian Nicholson
- 2021 - Kim Corace
- 2022 - Ada Sinacore
- 2023 - Kerrie Ritchie
- 2024 - Eleanor Gittens
- 2025 - Anita Gupta
- 2026 - Steven M. Smith
- 2027 - Janine Hubbard

== See also ==
- American Psychological Association
