= Robert B. Malmo =

Canadian psychologist

Robert Beverley Malmo
- Born: 24 October 1912; Panama Canal Zone
- Died: 1 July 2002 (aged 89); Montreal
- Education: Yale University
- Scientific career
- Fields: Neuropsychology
- Workplaces: McGill University
- Thesis: Effects of removal of the visual cortex on brightness discrimination (1940)
- Doctoral students: Gordon Aylmer McMurray, Clara Strauss, Abram Amsel

Robert Beverley Malmo (1912-2002) was a Canadian psychologist.

== Career ==
Malmo was born in the Panama Canal Zone where his parents were working. He attended the University of Missouri from which he gained a B.A. (1935) followed by a M.A. (1937). He then moved to Yale University from which he obtained his Ph.D. (1940). He then took an internship in Clinical Psychology at the Norwich Connecticut State Hospital and received a diploma in clinical psychology from the American Board of Professional Psychology. In 1944 he did war-time research at the National Institute of Health in Bethesda, Maryland, as part of an Aviation Medical Team.

In 1945 he moved to Montreal to establish the first psychological testing service for the Royal Victoria Hospital, and established the Laboratory for Psychological Studies, for research and for training students and residents. He had joint appointments in the Departments of Psychiatry and Psychology, McGill University, Montreal where he spent the remainder of his academic career.

He was active in the Canadian Psychological Association, of which he became president in 1962.

== Publications ==
- Malmo, H. P. & Malmo, R. B. (1977) Movement-related forebrain and midbrain multiple unit activity in rats. Electroencephalography and Clinical Neurophysiology 42: 501 -09
- Malmo, R.B. (1975). On Emotions, Needs and Our Archaic Brain. New York: Holt, Rinehart and Winston.
- Malmo, R. B. (1963) On central and autonomic nervous system mechanisms in conditioning, learning and performance. Canadian Journal of Psychology 17:1-36.
- Malmo, R. B. (1963) Heart rate reactions and locus of stimulation within the septal area of the rat. Science 144:1029-30
- Ross, A. R., & Malmo, R. B. (1979). Cardiovascular responses to rewarding brain stimulation. Physiology & Behavior, 22, 1005

== Positions ==
- President, Canadian Psychological Association (1962)
- Honorary Life Fellow, Canadian Psychological Association

== Awards ==
- 1970: Honorary LL.D. University of Manitoba
- 2002: Twentieth Anniversary of the International Organization of Psychophysiology Award
- 1969: Citation of Merit, University of Missouri
- 1967: Centennial Medal of Canada
