= Debra Titone =

Cognitive psychologist

- Citizenship: Canada
- Occupations: Professor and Canada Research Chair in Language & Multilingualism, McGill University
- Awards: Richard C. Tees Distinguished Leadership Award, Canadian Society for Brain, Behaviour, & Cognitive Science (2019); Canadian Psychological Association, SWAP Feminist Mentoring Award (2017)

Academic background
- Education: New York University; Binghamton University

Debra Titone is a cognitive psychologist known for her research on bilingualism and multilingualism. She is currently a Professor of Psychology and a chair holder of Canada Research in Language & Multilingualism at McGill University. Titone is a founding member and officer of the professional society, Women in Cognitive Science. She and her colleagues have written about gender disparities in opportunities, along with the advancement of women the field of cognitive science, with specific reference to Canada.

Titone is a Fellow of the Canadian Society for Brain, Behaviour and Cognitive Science (CSBBCS) and, in 2019, she received their Richard C. Tees Distinguished Leadership Award. Previous honors included the SWAP Feminist Mentoring Award from the Canadian Psychological Association, awarded to Titone in 2017.

== Biography ==
Titone received her B.A., with honors in Psychology from New York University. She subsequently obtained her Ph.D. in Experimental Psychology from the Binghamton University in 1995, where she was mentored by Cynthia Connine. With Connine, she conducted research on idiomatic expressions, focusing specifically on how individual word components influence idiom interpretation.

Titone completed a postdoctoral fellowship at Brandeis University, supervised by Arthur Wingfield. With Wingfield, David Caplan, Gloria Waters, and others, Titone studied the impact of right-hemisphere brain damage and cognitive aging on sentence processing. During a subsequent postdoctoral fellowship at Harvard Medical School, Titone extended her research on language processing to individuals with schizophrenia, under the mentorship of Philip Holzman. Their results suggested the language atypicalities in schizophrenia may be due to faulty inhibitory control as opposed to a lack of sensitivity to contextual cues. Other research focused on possible deficits in associative, relational learning in schizophrenia.

Titone is a member of the Executive Board of the Centre for Research on Brain, Language & Music at McGill University, Université du Québec à Montréal, Concordia University, and Université de Montréal and an associate member of the International Laboratory of Brain, Music, and Sound Research. Her research has been supported by the Natural Sciences and Engineering Research Council and the Social Sciences and Humanities Research Council of Canada.

Titone's research program at McGill explores how people read, write, listen, and speak languages, possible advantages of bilingualism, and how the processing of multiple languages is different from monolingualism. Her work has aimed to characterize the diversity of language experiences that people have and how this diversity reflects the human brain's capacity for language. Titone's research on bilingualism, executive control, and aging suggests that bilinguals may experience multiple advantages in cognitive capacity as compared to monolinguals, which may stem from enhanced neurocognitive plasticity.

== Representative work ==
- Baum, S., & Titone, D. (2014). Moving toward a neuroplasticity view of bilingualism, executive control, and aging. Applied Psycholinguistics, 35(5), 857–894.
- Gullifer, J. W., & Titone, D. (2020). Characterizing the social diversity of bilingualism using language entropy. Bilingualism: Language and cognition, 94(1), 1-18.
- Pivneva, I., Mercier, J., & Titone, D. (2014). Executive control modulates cross-language lexical activation during L2 reading: Evidence from eye movements. Journal of Experimental Psychology: Learning, Memory, and Cognition, 40(3), 787–796.
- Titone, D. (1998). Hemispheric differences in context sensitivity during lexical ambiguity resolution. Brain and Language, 65(3), 361-394.
- Titone, D., Libben, M., Mercier, J., Whitford, V., & Pivneva, I. (2011). Bilingual lexical access during L1 sentence reading: The effects of L2 knowledge, semantic constraint, and L1–L2 intermixing. Journal of Experimental Psychology: Learning, Memory, and Cognition, 37(6), 1412-1431.
