= Gordon Aylmer McMurray =

Canadian psychologist (1913-2003)

- Born: 19 October 1913; Lennoxville, Quebec, Canada
- Died: 16 August 2003 (aged 89); Quebec
- Education: Bishop's University; McGill University
- Scientific career
- Workplaces: University of Saskatchewan
- Thesis: An experimental study of a case of insensitivity to pain (1949)
- Doctoral advisor: Robert B. Malmo

Gordon Aylmer McMurray (19 October 1913 - 16 August 2003) was a Canadian psychologist.

== Career ==
McMurray was born in Lennoxville, Quebec in 1913. He initially studied at Bishop's University from which he obtained a BSc in 1933 followed by an MSc in 1935. He then taught for several years in Quebec before enlisting in the Royal Canadian Air Force during World War II. After the war he returned to academic studies and obtained a PhD from McGill University in 1949. He then joined the faculty at the University of Saskatchewan where he remained until his retirement. He was Head of the Department of Psychology for from 1950 until 1970.

McMurray was active in the Canadian Psychological Association being elected president in 1963 and elected a fellow five years later.

He died in Quebec in 2003 and his files are stored in the archives of the University of Saskatchewan.

== Positions ==
- 1963: President, Canadian Psychological Association

== Awards ==
- 1968: Fellow, Canadian Psychological Association
