= Wesley H. Coons =

Canadian psychologist (1942–2021)

Wesley Harrison Coons
- Born: 1924; Lamont, Alberta
- Died: 2015 (aged 90–91); Orangeville, Ontario
- Citizenship: Canadian
- Occupation: Psychologist

Academic background
- Education: University of Toronto
- Thesis: (1955)

Academic work
- Discipline: Psychology
- Sub-discipline: Clinical psychology
- Institutions: York University

Wesley Harrison Coons (1924-2015) was a Canadian psychologist who played an important role on the development of clinical psychology in Canada.

== Biography ==
Coons was born in Lamont, Alberta in 1924. He enrolled in the University of Alberta but dropped out to join the Royal Canadian Air Force in 1942. After the war he returned to university and graduated with a BA in Philosophy and Psychology. He then proceeded to Toronto where he began research at the Institute of Aviation Medicine and enrolled in the University of Toronto from which he was awarded a PhD in clinical psychology in 1955.

He began his clinical career at the Ontario Hospital in Hamilton, Ontario where he became Chief of Psychology. He then moved into academia in the 1960s, first at Dalhousie University and then at York University where he remained for the remainder of his career retiring in 1989 as emeritus professor.

He was Chair of the Academic Panel of the Canada Council and Chair of the Ontario Council on Graduate Studies Appraisal Committee, President of the Ontario Psychological Association (OPA) (1957–58), Editor of the OPA Quarterly (1958–61), President of the Association of Psychologists of Nova Scotia (1962–63), Editor of the journal Canadian Psychologist (1963–66) and President (1967-68) and Honorary President (1983–84) of the Canadian Psychological Association. He chaired the Couchiching Conference on Training in Professional Psychology (1965) and wrote extensively on professional matters in the practice of psychology.

== Awards ==
- 1988: CPA Award for Distinguished Contributions to Psychology as a Profession.
- 1998: OPA Lifetime Achievement Award

== Research ==
His research was concerned with the processes and outcomes of psychotherapy.

== Publications ==
- The individual, language and society in Canada/L'individu, la langue et la société au Canada (Canada Council, 1955)
