= Luc Granger =

Canadian psychologist

Luc André Granger
- Born: April 8, 1944 (age 82); St. Jean, Québec, Canada

Academic background
- Education: University of Montréal
- Thesis: Variations de la fréquence cardiaque et de la résistance électrodermale dans des situations d'attention visuelle (1969)

Academic work
- Discipline: Psychology
- Sub-discipline: Clinical psychology
- Institutions: University of Montréal

Luc A. Granger is a Canadian psychologist whose work was concerned with the treatment of drug addicts and sex offenders.

== Career ==
Granger completed all of his higher education at the University of Montreal. In 1962 he was awarded a B.A., followed by a B.Sc. in 1964 and a PhD in 1969.

He was appointed Assistant professor psychology at the University of Montréal in 1969 and promoted to full professor in 1979. He was head of the Department of Psychology for three periods. He retired as Emeritus professor in 2009.

== Research ==
Granger's research was concerned with the treatment of drug addicts and perpetrators of sexual offences and crimes. He designed, for the Correctional Service of Canada, the development and supervision of clinical treatment programs for incarcerated offenders.

He is the co-author of the first three original books published in French in the field of behavioral therapy.

== Publications ==
- Malcuit, A., Granger, L. & Larocque, A. (1972). Les thérapies behaviorales: modifications correctives du comportement et behaviorisme. Québec: QC. Presses De L'université Laval
- Bouchard, M.-A., Granger. L., & Ladouceur, R. (1977). Principes Et Application Des Therapies Behaviorales. Paris: Editions Vigot.

== Positions ==
- President, Canadian Psychological Association (1980)
- President, Ordre des psychologues du Québec

== Awards ==
- Fellow, Canadian Psychological Association
- 2012: Prix Noël-Mailloux, Order des psychologues du Québec
