= Elizabeth Spillius =

Canadian anthropologist & psychoanalyst

Elizabeth Spillius (née Bott (March 3, 1924 – July 4, 2016) was a Canadian-English anthropologist, sociologist, and Kleinian psychoanalyst.

== Life ==
Born to Canadian psychologists Helen Bott and Edward Alexander Bott, Elizabeth Bott studied psychology at the University of Toronto and anthropology at the University of Chicago, where she gained her MA in 1949. She then travelled to London to work in anthropology at the London School of Economics and the Tavistock Institute of Human Relations.

Often regarded as a member of the Manchester Group of anthropologists, her best-known work was Family and Social Network (1957), based on her 1956 PhD with working-class families in East London, in which she formulated what was subsequently labelled the Bott Hypothesis: that the density of a husband and wife's separate social networks was positively associated with marital role segregation. The first results of her seminal work have been presented in front of a UNESCO seminar under the title Urban Families: Conjugal roles and social networks (1954) and subsequently have been published in 1955 and 1957. Therein she has also conceptualized different aspects of labour and task-division between couples and examined the supporting function of the environment relevant to current co-parenting research.

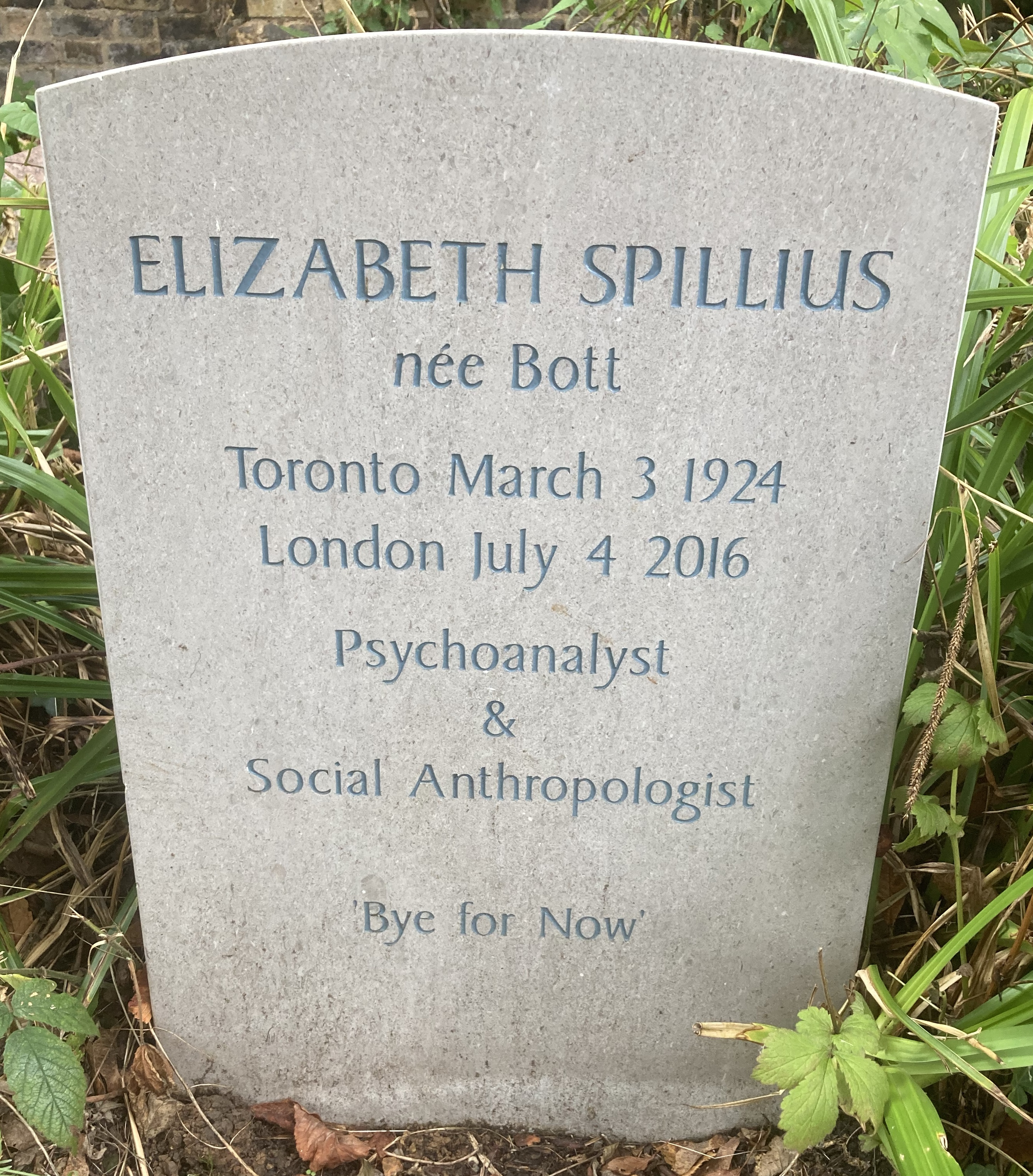
Grave of Elizabeth Spillius in Highgate Cemetery

In 1956, she began training analysis as a Kleinian psychoanalyst with Lois Munro. From 1958 to 1960, she carried out anthropological fieldwork in Tonga with her husband James. She became a member of the British Psychoanalytical Society in 1964, and a training and supervisory analyst in 1975.

From 1988 to 1998, she was general editor of the Routledge series New Library of Psychoanalysis. She has written several works of introduction to the work of Melanie Klein.

She died on 4 July 2016 and was buried on the eastern side of Highgate Cemetery.

== Works ==
- Elizabeth Bott. 1957. Family and Social Network. London: Tavistock.
- (ed.) Melanie Klein today: developments in theory and practice, Tavistock/Routledge, 1987. New Library of Psychoanalysis 7–8.
- (ed. with Michael Feldman) Psychic equilibrium and psychic change : selected papers of Betty Joseph, Tavistock/Routledge, 1989. New Library of Psychoanalysis 9
- (ed. with a preface) Melanie Klein in Berlin: her first psychoanalyses of children by Claudia Frank. Routledge, 2009.
