= P. Lynn Newbigging =

Canadian psychologist

Percy Lynn Newbigging
- Died: 7 January 1994
- Education: University of Saskatchewan; University College London
- Scientific career
- Fields: Psychology
- Workplaces: McMaster University

Percy Lynn Newbigging was a Canadian psychologist.

== Career ==
Newbigging obtained his first degree from the University of Saskatchewan followed by an MA from the University of Toronto in 1950. He then went to London where he obtained a Ph.D. from University College London.

He returned to Canada where he was Assistant Professor of Psychology at the University of New Brunswick (1953-1955) before moving to McMaster University as Professor of Psychology where he remained for the remainder of his career.

He was active in the Canadian Psychological Association of which he became president in 1965. He was also editor-in-chief of the Canadian Journal of Experimental Psychology (1965-1968).

== Heritage ==
Each year four P.L. Newbigging Prizes are awarded to students graduating with high averages from a program in the Department of Psychology, Neuroscience & Behaviour at McMaster University.

== Positions ==
- President, Canadian Psychological Association (1965)
- Honorary Life Fellow, Canadian Psychological Association

== Publications ==
- Newbigging, P.L. (1961). The perceptual redintegration of frequent and infrequent words. Canadian Journal of Psychology, 15, 123–132.
- Newbigging, P.L. (1965). Attention and perceptual learning. Canadian Psychologist, 6a, 309–331.
- Newbigging, P.L. and Hay, J. (1962). The practice effect in recognition threshold determinations as a function of word frequency and length. Canadian Journal of Psychology, 16, 177–184.
- Parker, N.I. and Newbigging, P.L. (1963). Magnitude and decrement of the Muller-Lyer Illusion as a function of pre-training. Canadian Journal of Psychology, 17, 134–140.
