= Elinor W. Ames =

Canadian psychologist

- Born: 1 October 1931; Weymouth, Massachusetts
- Died: 10 February 2023 (aged 91)
- Education: Tufts University; Cornell University
- Scientific career
- Fields: Developmental psychology
- Institutions: Simon Fraser University
- Thesis: (1960)

Elinor W. Ames (1931-2023) was a Canadian psychologist whose work was concerned with the psychological impact of adoption on children.

== Career ==
Ames was born and grew up in the town of Weymouth, Massachusetts. She attended Tufts University from which she graduated with a BSc in Psychology in 1953 followed by a PhD in Developmental Psychology from Cornell University in 1960.

In 1965, Ames joined the Psychology Department at Simon Fraser University as a charter faculty member and stayed for the remainder of her academic career retiring as Emeritus Professor of Psychology in 1997.

She was an active member of regional youth and seniors organizations and of a national psychological association. She was President of the Society for Children and Youth of BC and of the North Shore Keep Well Society. In 1985 she was elected President of the Canadian Psychological Association.

== Research ==
Ames's research was on various aspects of child development (e.g., Ames, 1985) but especially the impact of adoption on children with a particular focus on Romanian children (e.g. Chisholm et al., 1995; Fisher et al., 1997; Mainemer et al., 1998).

== Publications ==
- Ames, E. W. (1985). Mundus et Infans. Canadian Psychology / Psychologie canadienne, 26(4), 262–274.
- Ames, W.W. (1997). THE DEVELOPMENT OF ROMANIAN ORPHANAGE CHILDREN ADOPTED TO CANADA. National Welfare Grants Program, Human Resources Development Canada
- Chisholm K, Carter MC, Ames EW, Morison SJ. Attachment security and indiscriminately friendly behavior in children adopted from Romanian orphanages. Development and Psychopathology. 1995;7(2):283-294.
- Fisher, L., Ames, E. W., Chisholm, K., & Savoie, L. (1997). Problems Reported by Parents of Romanian Orphans Adopted to British Columbia. International Journal of Behavioral Development, 20(1), 67-82.
- Mainemer, H., GilmanN, L.C., & Ames, E.W. (1998). Parenting Stress in Families Adopting Children From Romanian Orphanages. Journal of Family Issues, 19(2), 164-180.

== Positions ==
- President, Canadian Psychological Association (1985)
