= Patrick O'Neill (psychologist) =

Canadian psychologist (1942–2021)

- Born: 1942; Vancouver, British Columbia
- Died: 2021 (aged 78–79)
- Citizenship: Canadian
- Occupation: Psychologist

Academic background
- Education: Yale University
- Thesis: Self-esteem and behavior of girls with convergent and divergent cognitive abilities in two types of schools (1974)

Academic work
- Discipline: Psychology
- Sub-discipline: Clinical-community psychology
- Institutions: Acadia University

Patrick O'Neill (1942-2021) was a Canadian psychologist with expertise in community-clinical psychology.

== Biography ==
Patrick Terence Hugh O'Neill was born in Vancouver in 1942. He was raised by his mother Catherine after his father did not return from the war. He left school early and worked initially as a radio announcer. He later was an actor, director and playwright in Victoria, British Columbia. In 1967, he began working as a child care worker and then enrolled at the University of Victoria from which he obtained a BA. He proceeded to Yale University from which he obtained an MS and then a PhD in clinical-community psychology.

He returned in Canada in 1974 to a post in Acadia University where he worked for the next 29 years when he retired as emeritus professor. During his time at Acadia he was very active in trade union affairs. He was for nine years a member of the Academic Freedom and Tenure Committee of the Canadian Association of University Teachers, including a term as chair. He was also active in local and national psychology associations. He became Chair of the Nova Scotia Board of Examiners in Psychology, Editor of the Canadian Psychologist and President of the Canadian Psychological Association. He was executive director of the Council of Canadian Departments of Psychology.

He was appointed to two of the Interagency Advisory Panel on Research Ethics (PRE) committees: the Social Sciences and Humanities Research Ethics Special Working Committee (SSHWC) and the SubGroup on Procedural Issues for the TCPS (ProGroup).

== Research ==
His main research interest were in community psychology and ethical decision-making.

== Publications ==
- Negotiating Consent in Psychotherapy (New York University Press)
- Community Consultation (Jossey-Bass)
