= David J.L. Bélanger =

Canadian psychologist

- Born: David J.L. Bélanger; 1921
- Died: 2013 (aged 91–92) 18 April; Montréal
- Education: Université de Montréal
- Awards: Doctorat honoris causa en psychologie, Université Laval
- Scientific career
- Fields: psychology
- Workplaces: Université de Montréal
- Thesis: Les relations entre la fréquence cardiaque du rat et les niveaux de tendance et d'activation (1959)

David J.L. Bélanger (1921–2013) was a Canadian psychologist who contributed substantially to the development of psychology in Canada.

== Career ==
Bélanger spent his whole academic career at the Université de Montréal from which he obtained his PhD. He was the first director of the Institute of Psychology. He then became Dean of the Faculty of Philosophy, and finally director of the Department of Psychology.

== Professional ==
Bélanger was a founding member of the Ordre des psychologues du Québec and a member of the editorial board of several periodicals, including L'Année psychologique, the oldest French-language psychology journal. He was also active in the Canadian Psychological Association and was President of the Association in 1957.

== Awards ==
- Doctorat honoris causa en psychologie, Université Laval
- 1987: Prix Noël-Mailloux, Order des psychologues du Québec
- 1985: Award for Distinguished Contributions to Psychology as a Profession, Canadian Psychological Association
- Honorary Life Fellow, Canadian Psychological Association
- Fellowship, Canadian Psychological Association

== Publications ==
- Adair, J. G., Bélanger, D., & Dion, K. L. (Eds.). (1998). Advances in psychological science, Vol. 1. Social, personal, and cultural aspects. Psychology Press/Erlbaum (UK) Taylor & Francis.
