= Dr. Eric Jackman Institute of Child Study =

Research institute and laboratory school at OISE

Coordinates: 43°40′10.62″N 79°24′20.65″W

- Established: 1925; 101 years ago (as St. George’s School for Child Study)
- Parent institution: Ontario Institute for Studies in Education
- Director: Rhonda Martinussen
- Location: 45 Walmer Road; Toronto, Ontario, Canada
- Website: oise.utoronto.ca/jics

The Dr. Eric Jackman Institute of Child Study (JICS) is a research institute and laboratory school of the Ontario Institute for Studies in Education (OISE) at the University of Toronto. The institute comprises a graduate education centre with a 2-year master of arts program, an elementary school for children from nursery to 6th grade, and a multidisciplinary research centre in child development.

== History ==
In 1925, Professor Edward Alexander Bott established the St. George’s School for Child Study at the University of Toronto, which would eventually come to be known as The Institute for Child Study. A number of factors contributed to the school's beginnings: the efforts of the Canadian National Committee for Mental Hygiene (of which Bott was a prominent member), the emergence of psychology as a discipline distinct from philosophy at the University of Toronto, the philanthropic activities of the Rockefeller Foundation, and the evolution of the Child Study movement in North America.

In 1924, with project grants awarded by the Laura Spelman Rockefeller Memorial Foundation and the Canadian National Mental Hygiene Committee, Bott set up an interdisciplinary project administration board. He hired Dr. William E. Blatz, who was then responsible for directing projects for the board, which included setting up a major longitudinal study of some 1400 elementary school children to study specific areas of their social adjustment, designing and implementing a laboratory nursery school, and developing a parental education program. While the large scale study was carried out at the Regal Road Public School, the nursery school and the parent education program were to become the two major divisions of the St. George’s School.

By 1937, the funding of the Rockefeller Foundation covered only about half of the school’s expenses, and a special committee was appointed by the university governors to consider the future of St. George’s. The decision was to make child study a faculty unto itself, which would keep it under the wing of the University of Toronto, but invite outside financing. In 1937, St. George's School for Child Study, including the research and graduate education activities, was renamed the Institute of Child Study.

In 2010, the institute was named in honour of Dr. Eric Jackman, a clinical psychologist and alumnus of the laboratory school whose financial gift was the largest donation to early childhood education in Canadian history.

== Master of Arts Program ==
The 2-year MA in Child Study and Education, first offered in 1997, is offered to students holding a four-year bachelor's degree in any discipline. It combines elementary teacher education with graduate studies. Students in the MA program carryout practicum teaching assignments at the ICS Laboratory School, as well as in public school settings. The program offers students a thesis option—Qualifying Research Paper—generally undertaken by students who plan to pursue doctoral work.

== Research Centre ==
Endowed in 1992, the Dr. R.G.N. Laidlaw Research Centre is aimed at understanding children and innovative programs to support their education and development. An overarching theme for investigation is how to promote the movement of research into practice, or in some cases, how research emerges from practice through action research. Some areas of interest are concerned with elementary education, including literacy, numeracy, and science, with supports for understanding how new technologies may contribute to children’s learning and how knowledge building communities are formed. Another focal point of research is concerned with early childhood development and community-school relationships that support children and families. Research at the centre benefits from collaboration among faculty, graduate students, and the ICS Laboratory School teacher-researchers, and by links to partner schools.

== See also ==
- List of academic units of the University of Toronto
