= Park O. Davidson =

Canadian psychologist

- Born: 1937
- Died: December 21, 1980 (aged 42–43)
- Education: University of Alberta; Queen's University at Kingston
- Scientific career
- Fields: Psychology
- Workplaces: University of British Columbia; University of Calgary
- Theses: The use of the Glueck social prediction table in determining probability for recidivism for young adult male offenders : a preliminary study (MA) (1959); An investigation of some individual differences in human conditionability (PhD) (1962)

Park O. Davidson was a Canadian psychologist.

== Career ==
Davidson graduated from the University of Alberta with a bachelor's and master's degree. He then proceeded to Queen's University at Kingston where he obtained a PhD. He returned to Alberta where he worked with the Alberta Guidance Clinic.

He was appointed to the University of Calgary where he was rapidly promoted to full Professor of Psychology. He then moved to the University of British Columbia where he developed a graduate programme in Clinical/Community Psychology.

He was a pioneer in the development of community mental health services.

On December 21, 1980, he and his wife, Sheena, were killed in a head-on collision on the Trans-Canada Highway in southern British Columbia.

He was active in regional and national associations of psychology.

== Heritage ==
The British Columbia Psychological Association named the annual Practice of Psychology Award in memory of Park O. Davidson. This Award recognizes significant and distinguished contributions to the practice of the profession of psychology in British Columbia.

== Positions ==
- President, Psychological Association of Alberta
- Chair, Canadian Advisory Council of Provincial Associations of Psychology
- President, Canadian Psychological Association (1976)

== Publications ==
- Bobey, M.J., & Davidson, P.O. (1970). Psychological factors affecting pain tolerance. Journal of Psychosomatic Research, 14(4), 371–376.
- Davidson, P.O., & Davidson, S.M. (eds). (1980). Behavioral Medicine: Changing health lifestyles. New York: Brunner/Mazel.
