= C. Roger Myers =

Canadian psychologist (1906–1985)

- Born: C. Roger Myers; February 12, 1906; Calgary, Alberta, Canada
- Died: June 5, 1985 (aged 79); Toronto, Ontario, Canada

C. Roger Myers (February 12, 1906 – June 5, 1985) was a Canadian psychologist.

== Early life and career ==
He was born in Calgary, Alberta on February 12, 1906. He was obtained a BSc (1927) followed by a MSc (1929) and then a PhD (1937) from the University of Toronto. He began teaching psychology there in 1931 and became a full professor in 1948. He was chair of the Department of Psychology from 1956 to 1968.

Myers had many firsts in his professional career. He was one of the first two psychology interns employed by the Ontario Hospital Service; the first Consulting Psychologist for the Ontario Department of Health (1930 to 1963); and the first person in charge of research at the Toronto Psychiatric Hospital before Second World War.

He was very active provincially and nationally in establishing psychology as a recognized profession. During the 1950s he promoted legislation in Ontario to establish the Ontario Board of Examiners in Psychology. He was the first chair of the Board (1960 to 1965). He was also a founding member of the Canadian Psychological Association in 1940, its secretary and, in 1950, its president. Later, from 1970 to 1978 he was the Association's first executive officer. He was a founding member of the Ontario Psychological Association in 1947 and its first president.

He compiled over 100 interviews with leading psychologists in Canada which are preserved in the C. Roger Myers Oral History Collection, Canadian Psychological Association Archives, National Archives of Canada.

He died in Toronto in 1985.

== Positions ==
- 1950: President, Canadian Psychological Association
