= Reg B. Bromiley =

Canadian psychologist (1911–??)

Reg Bromiley
- Born: Reginald Beswicke Bromiley; 22 May 1911; Alberta
- Education: University of British Columbia, Johns Hopkins University
- Scientific career
- Fields: experimental psychology
- Thesis: The development of conditioned motor responses after partial and complete removals of neocortex ... (1939 (1947?))

Reginald (Reg) B. Bromiley (1911-?) was an experimental psychologist who played a prominent role in the establishment of psychology as a discipline in Canada after the Second World War.

== Academic career ==
Bromiley received a BA in psychology from the University of British Columbia and then he proceeded to Johns Hopkins University School of Medicine from which he received a PhD in 1939. His thesis was subsequently published (Bromiley, 1952)

With the outbreak of the Second World War he enlisted in the Canadian Armed Forces in which he rose to the rank of Major. He was posted to Europe and for a period worked in the Psychological Laboratory, University of Cambridge and with the military Operational Research Group. He then served in military operations and was captured and was a prisoner-of-war in Germany 1944-1945.

After the war he returned to North America and took up the post of Assistant Professor of Physiology at Johns Hopkins University followed by a similar post at the Yerkes Laboratories of Primate Biology Yale University.

He returned to Canada in 1951 where he was initially Head of the Applied Experimental Psychology Section, Human Factors Wing, Defence Research Medical Laboratories in Toronto. In 1957 he took over as Superintendent of the Human Factors Wing where he remained for the remainder of his career.

== Research ==
Bromiley conducted research in two areas. First was research on conditioned nervous responses and reflexes and on human engineering. Second was his research in the defence arena.

== Professional ==
Bromiley played a very active role in the developing the Canadian Psychological Association. He was Secretary General, President-elect and then President of the Association. He was centrally involved in the Opinicon Conference which was concerned with the development of psychology across Canada. It was held in 1960 near Opinicon Lake in Ontario.

== Publications ==
Bromiley, RB (1952). The development of conditioned motor responses after partial and complete removals of neocortex. Baltimore, MD: JHU Press.
