= Canadian Journal of Behavioural Science =

Canadian Journal of Behavioural Science Revue canadienne des sciences du comportement (French)
- Discipline: Psychology
- Language: English, French
- Edited by: Annie Roy-Charland

Publication details
- History: 1969-present
- Publisher: American Psychological Association on behalf of the Canadian Psychological Association
- Frequency: Quarterly
- Impact factor: 1.574 (2020)

Standard abbreviations
- ISO 4: Can. J. Behav. Sci.

Indexing
- CODEN: CJBSAA
- ISSN: 0008-400X (print); 1879-2669 (web)
- LCCN: 78010238
- OCLC no.: 1553131

Links
- Journal homepage; Online access

The Canadian Journal of Behavioural Science (French: Revue canadienne des sciences du comportement) is a quarterly peer-reviewed academic journal published by the American Psychological Association on behalf of the Canadian Psychological Association. The editor-in-chief is Allison J. Ouimet (University of Ottawa). The journal was established in 1969 and covers all aspects of psychology.

== Abstracting and indexing ==
The journal is abstracted and indexed by MEDLINE/PubMed and the Social Sciences Citation Index. According to the Journal Citation Reports, the journal has a 2020 impact factor of 1.574.
