= Pain Research & Management =

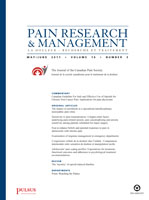
- Discipline: Neurology, psychophysiology
- Language: English, French
- Edited by: Kenneth D. Craig

Publication details
- History: 1996-present
- Publisher: Hindawi Publishing Corporation (Canada)
- Open access: Yes
- Impact factor: 1.685 (2015)

Standard abbreviations
- ISO 4: Pain Res. Manag.

Indexing
- ISSN: 1203-6765 (print); 1918-1523 (web)
- OCLC no.: 36289136

Links
- Journal homepage; Online archive

Pain Research & Management is a peer-reviewed medical journal. It covers all aspects of research on pain management. The journal is published by the Hindawi Publishing Corporation.

In 2014, the journal moved to open access.
