= John M. MacEachran =

Canadian philosopher and psychologist

John Malcolm MacEachran (January 16, 1877 – 1971) was a Canadian philosopher and psychologist, whose most notable credentials involved the development of the Psychology and Philosophy Department at the University of Alberta. He was a co-founder of the Canadian Psychological Association and the appointed Chairman of the Alberta Eugenics Board which was responsible for approving the sterilization of thousands of Albertans, hundreds of which were without consent.

== Early years (1877-1909) ==
John Malcolm MacEachran was born in Glencoe, Ontario in Canada to David and Christina MacEachran. After finishing his primary education in the public school system of Glencoe, he was admitted to Queen's University in Ontario. There, MacEachran obtained an MA in Mental and Moral Philosophy (1902), became the appointed assistant to Professor John Watson, and obtained his first PhD in 1906. Following his apprenticeship, MacEachran traveled to Berlin, Germany, where he worked with the well-known scholars Friedrich Paulsen and Carl Stumpf, further increasing his knowledge of modern psychology, ethics, and the philosophy of education. MacEachran then officially commenced schooling in Germany where he became a student of the psychologist/philosopher Wilhelm Wundt at the Leipzig University (1907). Here he wrote his doctoral thesis Der Pragmatismus (1909) earning him his second PhD. MacEachran then traveled to Paris where he studied sociology under Émile Durkheim and took a class under Alfred Binet, who had recently developed the IQ test (1908). MacEachran's academic relationship with Henri Bergson spurred his interest in combining the disciplines of philosophy and biological science. Dr. MacEachran accepted an offer from the then newly founded University of Alberta to head its Department of Philosophy and Psychology in 1909.

== University of Alberta years (1909-1945) ==
In 1909, J.M. MacEachran was appointed head of the Department of Psychology and Philosophy at the University of Alberta. As the head of a new department, MacEachran fabricated the curriculum from scratch and in his first year at the U of A, MacEachran offered introductory courses in experimental and modern psychology. As the program developed, MacEachran made junior and senior level courses available and in 1911, he made it possible to graduate with a M.A and B.A in the field of psychology. Other classes that were added to the curriculum included: psychology and logic, comparative psychology (animal evolution, child psychology and racial psychology), physiological psychology, abnormal psychology and psychology of religion. At this point, MacEachran had developed and supported the whole of the undergraduate philosophy and psychology programs and supervised at least one Masters level student. He MacEachran also began administrative duties for the university in 1911, and officially accepted the position as the University of Alberta's first Provost in 1912. All of these responsibilities earned him a salary of $4,900.

During the First World War (1916-1918), J.M. MacEachran enlisted as captain in the 196th Western Universities Battalion on March 15, 1916. He also served with the 19th Reserve Battalion, the C.E.F. Young Soldiers' Battalion, and the 13th Brigade C.F. in France.

After MacEachran's return to the University of Alberta after World War I (1918), a central focus was developing applied psychology. Courses such as applied psychology, educational psychology, industrial psychology, legal psychology and psychology and economic problems were introduced into the curriculum. While studying at Leipzig University, Wilhelm Wundt lectured to MacEachran that experimental psychology would have to be meticulously studied for two or three centuries before it was to be applied – MacEachran installed applied psychology at the University of Alberta only one decade later.

In 1938 MacEachran co-founded the Canadian Psychological Association and became the first honorary President in 1939.

With the additional faculty, the number and range of classes broadened. In the late 1930s and early 1940s, laboratory psychology was crafted. In August 1945, after shaping the Department of Philosophy and Psychology, and much of the Universities' administrative routine, MacEachran retired as Emeritus Professor of Philosophy. His successor was John MacDonald. In 1960 the Department of Philosophy and Psychology split into independent departments.

== Alberta Eugenics Board (1928-1965) ==
J.M. MacEachran was appointed Head of Alberta Eugenics Board in 1928, immediately after the Alberta government enacted the Sexual Sterilization Act. MacEachran was appointed Chairman for the purpose of developing a philosophical justification for the eugenics movement. He was an ideal candidate for the position because of his extensive background in philosophy and psychology. The purpose of the Alberta Eugenics board is outlined in section 4(1) of the Sexual Sterilization Act:

Section 4(1) of the Sexual Sterilization Act empowered the medical superintendent of a mental hospital to cause a patient of the mental hospital whom it proposed to discharge to be examined by or in the presence of the eugenics board, with a view to sterilization. Section 5 of the Act established two grounds for sterilization: that procreation by the person under consideration would result in the transmission of any mental disability or deficiency to his or her progeny or involved the risk of mental injury either to such a person or his or her progeny.

J.M MacEachran of Edmonton (U of A, Chairman), E.L. Pope of Edmonton (U of A, Professor of Medicine), E.G. Mason of Calgary, and Mrs J.H Field of Spurfield (Secretary) were the original four members of the board whose job was to approve or reject patients for sterilization with respect to the guidelines of the Sexual Sterilization Act.

Five years after the first meeting of the Alberta Eugenics Board in 1929, at the annual meeting of the Canadian Medical Association (CMA) in 1934, it was noted that 288 cases had been approved by the Eugenics Board for sterilization, and that 60% of these cases involved serious mental or nervous disease in the patients family record. Two classes of individuals were sterilized - those with low mental IQ's and those who had suffered serious mental breakdowns, and therefore could not be recommended for parenthood by any physician. It was also noted that any operations to be completed on the patients first required personal consent, or consent from family. If no one was eligible to provide consent and the patient was not capable of signing personal consent due to physical or mental barriers, the Minister of Health could do so. In 1933, the Eugenics Board consented that the Chairman, Dr. MacEachran, would have the authority to dictate when an operation for sterilization would take place. Members of the CMA, agreed:

Evidence [had] shown overwhelmingly that sterilization [was] a sound, humane and effective procedure, and [was] one of the chief means of coping with the grave problem of the increasingly large number of mentally sick and mentally deficient persons that each province [was] being called upon to care for.

In 1937, the Social Credit government passed an amendment that strongly restricted the need for the Eugenics Board to obtain the consent of the patients to be sterilized. This increased the efficiency of the sterilization process, as more patients could be approved for sterilization by the Eugenics board. In the 44 years that the board was empowered by the government of Alberta, 2822 sterilizations were processed. MacEachran resigned from Chairman of the Alberta Eugenics Board on June 30, 1965, serving for 38 consecutive years. During his term as Chairman, MacEachran signed over 3200 applications approving for sterilization of adults and children (~60% of approvals resulted in sterilizations). His successor was R.K. Thomson who was chairman until 1972 when the Sexual Sterilization Act was repealed.

== University of Alberta ceases honours in MacEachran's name (1990s) ==
In 1975, the University of Alberta's Department of Psychology inaugurated an annual lecture series honouring MacEachran. Every year a distinguished scholar of psychology would be invited to give a lecture to students and faculty in MacEachran's honor. Awards and scholarships were also distributed in MacEachran's honour, first in 1958 and then 1972 with endowments from his estate. After 1972, the Faculty of Education and the Departments of Philosophy and Psychology awarded annual scholarships to students honouring MacEachran's accomplishments.

On September 3, 1997, a committee at the University of Alberta voted to rename the lecture series due to MacEachran's involvement in the unlawful sterilization of many Albertans. In 1998, a University of Alberta panel submitted a request to halt the distribution of awards in J.M. MacEachran's name. This request was based on data obtained from the Leilani Muir versus the Province of Alberta trial, which showed that many of the sterilizations were unlawfully approved by the Alberta Eugenics Board. The board, headed by J.M. MacEachran, approved sterilizations without clear evidence that the patient's deficiencies would be transmitted to their progeny. The board approved sterilizations of patients who did not fall into the category of "mentally defective". A section of the Sterilization Act stated that upon sterilization, the patient would be discharged from the holding facility and in many instances, patients were sterilized even though discharge was not imminent.

The board also approved the sterilization of patients already known to be infertile (patients with Down syndrome). Furthermore, castrations were approved in order to obtain testicular tissue for research purposes. The board approved sterilizations with the understanding that patient's sexual behaviour would be altered, therefore eliminating sexual deviancy, and also with the goal of stopping menstruation in women. MacEachran had also signed application forms, approving sterilization before the patients had been interviewed by the board. With regards to the Leilani Muir vs. Alberta trial, Madame Justice Joanne B. Veit noted:

Dr. Thompson's [a former chair holder of the Alberta Eugenics Board] evidence demonstrates that the operations of the Board initiated on a purported scientific rationale, degenerated into unscientific practices. The decisions of the Board were not made according to the standards imposed on them by the legislation, but because the members of the Board... thought that it was socially appropriate to control reproduction of "these people".

Because of the previously stated reasons, in 1998, the Department of Philosophy at the University of Alberta stopped giving out rewards honouring MacEachran's name. A single MacEachran award was given out in 2003 from the Department of Philosophy, and then no more thereafter.

== Bibliography ==
- "Pragmatismus – Eine Neue Richtung Der Philosophie" (1910)
- "Social Legislation in the Province of Alberta, Canada"
- "A philosopher looks at mental hygiene" (1932)
- "Some Present-Day Tendencies in Philosophy"
- "John Watson"
- "These Twenty-five Years – A symposium" W.H. Alexander, E.K. Broadus, F.J. Lewis, and J.M. MacEachran (1933)
- "A Dream of Olympus" Speech to the Faculty club, (October 23, 1932)
- "Crime and Punishment" The Press Bulletin, Department of Extension of the University of Alberta (May 6, 1932)
- "The Philosophy of Alfred North Whitehead"
- "Plato 1, A Philosophical Overture"
- "Plato and His World, Vol. 2"
- "A Philosophical Prelude"
- "God and the Cosmos"
- "Plato and His World. Volumes I-IV"
- "The Social Philosophy of Plato as Contained in the Republic and the Laws"
- "The Philosophy of John Dewey"
- "Humanism in Greek Poetry"
