= David A. Olsen =

- Born: November 29, 1937; Bronxville, New York, United States
- Died: November 14, 2009 (aged 71)
- Occupation: Business executive in the insurance industry
- Known for: CEO of insurance firm Johnson & Higgins
- Spouse: Roberta (m. 1963)
- Children: 2

David A. Olsen (November 29, 1937 - November 14, 2009) was an American business executive who was chairman of insurance brokerage firm Johnson & Higgins from 1991 until it was acquired by Marsh & McLennan in 1997.

== Career ==
Olsen attended Bowdoin College, and subsequently joined brokerage firm Johnson & Higgins in 1966. He became its chief executive officer in 1990 and held that position until 1997, when the company merged with Marsh & McLennan (MMC).

Additionally, he was chairman of the company from 1991 until 1997. He served as vice chairman of MMC from May through December 1997 and served on the board. Olsen also serves as a trustee emeritus of Bowdoin College, a director of Salisbury Visiting Nurses Association, and an advisory board member of the Salisbury Housing Trust and the Northwest Center for Family Services in Maine.

== Personal life ==
Olson married Roberta on May 11, 1963 and had two children, a son Brad and a daughter Amy.
