= Michel Sabourin =

Canadian academic

Academic background
- Education: University of Montreal
- Thesis: Effets de l'induction hypnotique et de la suggestion sur l'amnésie dans la psychose chronique (1971)

Academic work
- Institutions: University of Montreal

Michael Sabourin, is a Canadian psychologist.

== Education ==
Sabourin studied at Collège Jean-de-Brébeuf in Montréal from which he graduated in 1968. He then proceeded to the University of Montreal from which he obtained an MSc (1968) followed by a PhD (1971) in psychology.

== Career and research ==
He was appointed to a faculty position in the Department of Psychology of the University of Montreal in 1970 rising to the position of Departmental Chair. He retired as Emeritus Professor in 2010.

Sabourin's research was in three fields: 1) Neuroscience: EEG and evoked potentials in altered states of consciousness (1970 – 1985); 2) Applied Social Psychology: The evaluation of credibility in a multi-ethnic environment; 3) Confidentiality and data access, professional and research ethics.

He pioneered in the development of legal psychology in research and professional practice, has acted as consultant for jury trial preparation in criminal cases and has testified as expert witness in several cases.

Sabourin played a very active role in several professional psychological associations including the Canadian Psychological Association, the Quebec College of Psychologists and the International Union of Psychological Science.

== Affiliations ==
- Treasurer and Member of the Executive Committee of International Union of Psychological Science (IUPsyS)
- President, Canadian Psychological Association (1989-1991)
- President, Québec College of Psychologists (1982-1985; 1992-1994)
- Main Delegate and Coordinator of United Nations activities for the IUPsyS, with the Economic and Social Council (ECOSOC) and the Department of Public Information (DPI), United Nations Secretariat, New York, and Palais des Nations, Geneva, 1998 – 2004
- Editor, International Journal of Psychology, 1988 – 1992.
- Member of the Committee on International Relations in Psychology (CIRP), American Psychological Association, 1993 – 1996
- Fellow of the Canadian Psychological Association
- Fellow of the American Psychological Association

== Awards ==
- 1996: The “Karl F. Heiser Presidential Award” of the American Psychological Association for advocacy on behalf of professional psychology
- 2000: Canadian Psychological Association Award for Distinguished Contributions to the International Advancement of Psychology
- 2006: Canadian Psychological Association Award for Distinguished Contributions to Psychology as a Profession
- 2006: Distinguished International Psychology Award, given by the American Psychological Association, for years of significant contributions to global psychology
- 2006: Prix Noël-Mailloux, Order des psychologues du Québec

== Heritage ==
The Université de Montréal’s psychology department established the Michel Sabourin Award for the best student in the clinical psychology programme.

In 2024, Sabourin established the Fonds Michel-Sabourin which each year awards a bursary of $10,000 to a student whose project focuses on a topic in legal/forensic psychology.
