= Terrence P. Hogan =

Canadian academic

Terrence Patrick Hogan
- Born: 10 May 1937; Dubuque,Iowa
- Died: 19 September 2007 (aged 70); Winnipeg

Academic background
- Education: Catholic University of America
- Thesis: Masculinity-femininity: a factor in decision making (1961)

Academic work
- Institutions: Bradley University; University of Manitoba

Terrence Patrick Hogan (1937–2007) was an American/Canadian psychologist who had a reputation for his research in clinical psychology and as an academic administrator. He served as President of the Canadian Psychological Association in 1983.

== Academic career ==
Hogan was born in Dubuque, Iowa in 1937. He attended Loras College from which he received his BA. He then proceeded to the Catholic University of America in Washington, D.C. from which he obtained his MA (1961) and his Ph.D. (1964). His MA thesis was entitled Masculinity-femininity: a factor in decision making. After he completed his doctorate, he worked with the Veterans Administration Hospital in Clinton, Iowa, taught at Bradley University in Peoria, Illinois and provided services at the Marshfield Clinic in Marshfield, Wisconsin.

In 1969, he moved to Canada where he joined the University of Manitoba, Winnipeg and served as Professor and Associate Head of the Department of Psychology. Over the following 35 years he held various administrative appointments at the university including Associate Dean of Arts, Dean of Graduate Studies, Associate Vice President (Academic) and Vice President (Research and External Relations).

He edited a book on family therapy which went through three editions. He also co-authored several dozen articles on a range of topics including decision-making, psychology and the law and training issues in psychology. He served on the editorial boards of Canadian Psychology and Canada's Mental Health.

He was elected President of the Canadian Psychological Association and was elected five times President of the Psychological Association of Manitoba (1978-1983).He was also elected President of the Canadian Society for the Study of Higher Education. The Canadian Psychological Association named him as the 2001 Member of the Year.

== Honours and awards ==
- President, Canadian Psychological Association 1983
- President, Psychological Association of Manitoba
- President, Canadian Society for the Study of Higher Education
- John C. Service Member the Year Award, Canadian Psychological Association
- Fellow, Canadian Psychological Association

== Publications ==
=== Books ===
- Erikson, G., & Hogan, T.P. (eds.) (1972, 1976, 1981). Family therapy: An introduction to theory and technique. Monterey, CA: Brooks/Cole.

=== Articles ===
- Hogan, TP (1983). Psychology and the technological revolution.Canadian Psychology, Vol.24 (4), p. 235-241
- Arnett, JL; Hogan, TP (1983). The role of the behavioral sciences in North American medical schools: an overview. Academic Medicine, Vol.58 (3), p. 201-3
- Hogan, TP, Hogan, TV, Gupton, TW. (1982). Credentialing in Canada: The Zimet Conference. Canadian Psychology, Vol.23 (1), p. 38-40
- Howard, M.L., Hogan, T.P. & Wright, M.W. (1975).The effects of drugs on psychiatric patients' performance on the Halstead-Reitan neuropsychological test battery. Journal of Mental and Nervous Disease, 161 (3), 166-171.
- Seidman, E., Golding, S. L., Hogan, T. P., & LeBow, M. D. (1974). A multidimensional interpretation and comparison of three A-B scales. Journal of Consulting and Clinical Psychology, 42(1), 10–20.
- Morgan, W., Hogan, TP. (1972). Repeated LSD ingestion and performance on neuropsychological tests. Journal of nervous and mental disease, 1972–06, Vol.154 (6), p. 432-438.
- Hogan, T. P. (1971). Review of Danny and Nicky [Review of the media Danny and nicky, by D. Jackson]. Professional Psychology, 2(1), 97.
- Hogan, TP (1969). Relationship between the Ammons IQ norms and WAIS test performances of psychiatric subjects. Journal of Clinical Psychology, Vol.25 (3), p. 275-276.
- Fahs, H., Hogan, T. P., & Fullerton, D. T. (1969). An Emotional Profile of Depression. Psychological Reports, 25(1), 18.
- Gibby, R.G., Gibby, R.G., & Hogan, T.P. (1967). Relationships between dominance needs and decision-making ability. Journal of Clinical Psychology, 23 (4), 450.
