= David R. Olson =

Canadian psychologist

David Richard Olson
- Born: 16 June 1935; Saskatoon, Saskatchewan
- Education: University of Saskatchewan; University of Alberta
- Scientific career
- Fields: Psychology, cognitive development, literacy
- Workplaces: University of Toronto
- Thesis: The role of verbal rules in the cognitive processes of children (1963)

David Richard Olson (born June 16, 1935) is a Canadian cognitive developmental psychologist who has studied the development of language, literacy, and cognition, particularly the mental lives of children, their understanding of language and mind and the psychology of teaching. Olson is University Professor Emeritus at the Ontario Institute for Studies in Education at the University of Toronto, where he has taught since 1966.

== Biography ==
Olson was born in Saskatoon, Saskatchewan, and was raised by his grandparents until the age of 6, as his mother had contracted tuberculosis. He attended the University of Saskatchewan from 1953 to 1955, obtained a teaching certificate; he then taught in a village school in Alsask, Saskatchewan. He returned to the University of Saskatchewan, where he graduated with a B.Ed. in 1960. He went on to earn a Ph.D. from the University of Alberta in 1963. He worked briefly at Dalhousie University in Halifax, Nova Scotia, and was worked as a fellow under the supervision of Jerome Bruner, at Harvard University's Center for Cognitive Studies

Olson moved to Toronto in 1966 and has taught there ever since. He is recognized as a world authority on the psychological implications of literacy, a topic on which he has published widely and lectured around the world. He is cross-appointed to University College, Toronto and the University of Toronto. Olson is married and has five children.

== Cognitive developmental psychology ==
Under Bruner's sponsorship, Olson explored young children’s mental representations of space, particularly how children's language influenced their ability to reconstruct spatial patterns. He found that while children had no difficulty reconstructing horizontal and vertical patterns, they had great difficulties with diagonals before they went to school. It seems that to succeed in conceptualizing a diagonal, it has to be reconceived in terms of relations between horizontal and vertical axes. This research led to his first book, Spatial Cognition: The Child's Acquisition of Diagonality. (Erlbaum, 1970)

== The "say-mean" distinction and the Theory of Mind ==
In the 1970s, Olson began a research program on children's understanding of language and meaning, advancing the claim that young children fail to make a distinction between what is "said" and what is "meant." This led to a program of research on children's awareness of language and their understanding of mind. Along with Janet Astington, Alison Gopnik, and Lynd Forguson, Olson conducted pioneering work on the origins of the concept of belief and intention that led to the publication of the 1988 volume Developing Theories of Mind. See Astington, 2000 for an account of research in this period.

== The cognitive implications of literacy ==
Psychologists had traditionally seen writing as a tool for making speech transportable through space and time, a simple cipher for representing speech. Consequently, learning to read and write was seen as acquiring a skill for translating sounds into written signs. The accepted pedagogy was that of repetition and training. Olson's work, along with that of Emilia Ferreiro and others, has helped to shift the understanding of reading and writing acquisition from skills to be acquired into concepts to be understood.

When he began his studies, psychology made little allowance for language, let alone writing, as a cognitive resource in the mental lives of persons. Language achieved its place in cognitive theory and cognitive development in the 1960s due in large part to the work of Noam Chomsky, Roger Brown, and Jerome Bruner. Aside from some pointers to the significance of writing and a written language in the work of Lev Vygotsky (1987), writing had remained outside the purview of experimental cognitive psychology, and was accorded no role in the developmental process. In this context Olson advanced the revolutionary argument that, far from being an instrument for the convenient transmission of speech, writing is responsible in large part for shifting the speaker's attention from the ordinary pragmatic functions of language to the phonological, semantic, and syntactic properties of the language itself. Learning to be literate, Olson argued, was to learn to think about the properties of language that remain largely implicit in ordinary oral or natural language. This process leads to a new awareness of phonology, the definition of words, and the logical relations among sentences. Ironically, it is these literate properties of language that have dominated the concerns of philosophers, linguists, and psychologists who believe themselves to be studying ordinary oral language, whereas, Olson insists, they are primarily studying the properties of written language, a view shared by linguists Roy Harris (2009) and Per Linell (2005). Olson introduced this shifted perspective on language by providing a historical context in his widely anthologized 1977 article, "From utterance to text: The bias of language in speech and writing," published in the Harvard Educational Review. He vastly expanded the theory into the book ‘’The World on Paper: The Conceptual and Cognitive Implications of Writing and Reading" (CUP, 2004).

His empirical studies of children before, during, and after becoming literate examined the hypothesis that learning to read is primarily a matter of becoming conscious of the very properties implicit in the practices of speaking — consciousness primarily of phonemes, words, and sentences, and the effects of this consciousness in their subsequent learning and thinking. He continues to work on the philosophy of literacy influenced by the work of philosopher Robert Brandom in which literacy becomes one means for making knowledge explicit.

== Educational theory ==
Olson was long concerned with the implications of the advances in psychological theory for educational theory and practice an interest sponsored by Jerome Bruner's 1960 book, "The Process of Education" Olson examined the implications of the so-called "cognitive revolution" of the 1960s, a revolution led by the work of Noam Chomsky, Jerome Bruner, George Miller, Roger Brown, and others in a book entitled ‘’Jerome Bruner: The Cognitive Revolution in Educational Theory." (Continuum, 2007) He advanced a more general examination of the role of psychological research in educational theory in "Psychological Theory and Educational Reform: How School Remakes Mind and Society," (CUP, 2003) a book that linked his research on literacy and theory of mind with the school's role in intellectual and social development. He concluded that educational theory was better seen as a moral theory centered on agency and responsibility, rather than a purely cognitive one centered on knowledge.

== Theoretical applications in practice ==
Curriculum designer and school reformer, Cynthia McCallister, has collaborated with Olson to integrate his theories of literacy and responsibility into a pedagogical program called Learning Cultures, initially implemented in a number of schools in New York City. It incorporates a method of instruction called Cooperative Unison Reading whereby a small group of students read a text together orally and assume responsibility to initiate discussion around questions or points of interest.

== Recognition ==
- Honorary degrees, University of Gothenburg, University of Saskatchewan, University of Toronto.
- Fellow, Royal Society of Canada
- President, Canadian Psychological Association

== Books ==
Written or co-written

- Olson, D. R. (2022). Making Sense: What It Means to Understand. Cambridge: Cambridge University Press.
- Olson, D. R. (2016). The Mind on Paper: Reading, Consciousness and Rationality. Cambridge: Cambridge University Press.
- Olson, D. R. (2007). Jerome Bruner: The cognitive revolution in educational theory. New York: Continuum.
- Olson, D. R. (2003). Psychological theory and educational reform: How schools remake mind and society. Cambridge: Cambridge University Press.
- Olson, D. R. (1994). The world on paper: The conceptual and cognitive implications of writing and reading. Cambridge: Cambridge University Press.
- Olson, D. R., & Bialystok, E. (1983). Spatial cognition: The structure and development of the mental representation of spatial relations. Hillsdale, NJ: Erlbaum.
- Olson, D. R. (1970). Cognitive development: The child's acquisition of diagonality. New York: Academic Press. (Second edition: L. E. Erlbaum and Associates, 1996)

Edited or co-edited.

- Olson, D. R. & Torrance, N. G. (Eds.) (2009). Cambridge Handbook of Literacy. Cambridge, UK: Cambridge University Press.
- Olson, D. R. & Cole, M. (Eds.) (2006). Culture, technology and history: Implications of the work of Jack Goody. Mahwah, NJ: Erlbaum.
- Brockmeier, J., Wang, M., & Olson, D. R. (Eds.). (2002). Literacy, narratives and culture. London: Curzon.
- Olson, D. R., & Torrance, N. (Eds.). (2001). The making of literate societies. Oxford: Blackwell.
- Zelazo, P., Astington, J., & Olson, D. (Eds.). (1999). Developing theories of intention. Mahwah, NJ: Erlbaum.
- Olson, D. R., & Torrance, N. (Eds.). (1996). Modes of thought: Explorations in culture and cognition. New York: Cambridge University Press.
- Olson, D. R., & Torrance, N. (Eds.). (1996). Handbook of education and human development: New models of learning, teaching and schooling. Oxford: Blackwell.
- Taylor, I., & Olson, D. R. (Eds.). (1995). Scripts and literacy: Reading and learning to read alphabets, syllabaries, and characters. Amsterdam: Kluwer.
- Olson, D. R., & Torrance, N. G. (Eds.) (1991). Literacy and orality. Cambridge: Cambridge University Press.
- Astington, J. W., Harris, P. L., & Olson, D. R. (Eds.) (1988). Developing theories of mind. Cambridge: Cambridge University Press.
- van Holthoon, F., & D. R. Olson (Eds.) (1987). Common sense: The foundations for social science. Lanham, MD: University Press of America.
- Olson, D. R., Torrance, N., & Hildyard, A. (Eds.) (1985). Literacy, language and learning: The nature and consequences of reading and writing. Cambridge: Cambridge University Press.
- Olson, D. R. (Ed.) (1980). The social foundations of language and thought: Essays in honor of Jerome S. Bruner. New York: Norton.
- Olson, D. R. (Ed.) (1974). Media and symbols: The forms of expression, communication and education. The 73rd Yearbook of the National Society for the Study of Education. Chicago: University of Chicago Press.
