= George A. Ferguson =

Canadian psychologist

George Andrew Ferguson
- Born: 1914; New Glasgow, Nova Scotia, Canada
- Died: 2001 (aged 86–87)
- Occupation: Psychologist

Academic background
- Education: University of Edinburgh
- Thesis: The reliability of mental tests (1940)

Academic work
- Discipline: Psychology
- Sub-discipline: Mathematical psychology
- Institutions: McGill University
- Main interests: Psychological testing; Psychological statistics

George Andrew Ferguson (1914–2001) was a Canadian psychologist with particular expertise in statistics and mental measurement.

== Biography ==
Ferguson was born in New Glasgow, Pictou County, Nova Scotia in 1914. He attended Dalhousie University from which he graduated in 1936 with B.A. in Latin and classical philology. His was awarded a scholarship by the Imperial Order of the Daughters of the Empire which enabled him to enroll for graduate work at the University of Edinburgh from which he graduated with an M.Ed. in 1938 followed by a Ph.D. in 1940. His PhD dissertation led to a series of publications (Ferguson, 1940, 1941a,b,c).

In 1941, he joined the Canadian Army where he worked in various capacities. After the war, he worked in industrial psychology for two years until he joined the Department of Psychology at McGill University in 1947. He was Chair of the department from 1964 to 1975. He remained there for the rest of his career.

== Research ==
At McGill University his research continued to focus on psychological testing and psychological statistics (Ferguson, 1949, 1954a,b; 1956). His book on psychological statistics went through six editions and was very influential in undergraduate psychology teaching. It was widely reviewed. One reviewer described it as having "evidently found a market". Another commented: "Reading the sixth edition of Statistical Analysis in Psychology and Education was like having a conversation with an old friend, and the ability of the authors to communicate complex ideas to students is an asset for any textbook". The first edition was published in 1959 and the sixth in 1989 indicating that the book was a well-established text in universities for at least 30 years. He published a second statistical guidebook (Ferguson, 1965).

He had wide-ranging interests. Besides his work on statistics his publications include an assessment of the properties of the Rorschach test and another on the ideas of George Berkeley.

He was active in the Canadian Psychological Association and published several reports on the association. He was elected president of the association in 1956.

== Awards and honors ==
- Honorary Life Fellow, Canadian Psychological Association
- President, Canadian Psychological Association (1956)

== Publications ==
Books

- Nonparametric trend analysis: a practical guide for researchers (Montreal: McGill University Press, 1965)
- Statistical Analysis in Education and Psychology (New York: McGraw Hill, 1959, 1966, 1971, 1976, 1981)
  - ... (With Yoshio Takane, 1989)
- The Reliability of Mental Tests (University of London Press, 1941a)

Articles

- Ferguson GA (1956). On transfer and the abilities of man. Canadian Journal of Psychology, 10(3), 121-131.
- Ferguson GA (1954b). The concept of parsimony in factor analysis, Psychometrika, 19(4), 281-290.
- Ferguson, GA (1954a). On learning and human ability. Canadian Journal of Psychology, 8(2), 95-112.
- Scheier, IH & Ferguson GA (1952). Further factorial studies of tests of rigidity. Canadian Journal of Psychology, 6(1), 18-30.
- Oliver, JA & Ferguson, GA (1951). A factorial study of tests of rigidity. Canadian Journal of Psychology, 5(2), 49-59.
- Ferguson GA (1949). On the theory of test discrimination. Psychometrika, 14(1), 61-68.
- Ferguson GA (1941c). The application of Sheppard's correction for grouping. Psychometrika, 6(1), 21-27
- Ferguson, GA (1941b). A factorial interpretation of test difficulty. Psychometrika, 6(5), 323-329.
- Ferguson, G.A. (1940). A bi-factor analysis of reliability coefficients. British Journal of Psychology, 31(2), 172-182.
