= Innis-Gérin Medal =

Canadian social sciences award

The Innis-Gérin Medal is an award of the Royal Society of Canada for a distinguished and sustained contribution to the literature of the social sciences. It was established in 1966 and is given biennially. The award is named in honor of Harold Innis and Léon Gérin.

== Winners ==
- Source: Royal Society of Canada
- 2024 - Robert J. Vallerand
- 2022 - Jane Jenson, FRSC
- 2020 - Nancy Turner, FRSC
- 2018 - Jennifer Clapp
- 2016 - John A. Hall, FRSC
- 2014 - Janine Brodie, FRSC
- 2014 - John McGarry, FRSC
- 2011 - Georges Dionne, FRSC
- 2007 - Gilbert Laporte
- 2003 - Richard E. Tremblay, MSRC
- 2001 - Byron P. Rourke, FRSC
- 1999 - Rodolphe De Koninck, MSRC
- 1997 - Norman S. Endler
- 1995 - Albert Legault, MSRC
- 1991 - Thérèse Gouin-Décarie, MSRC
- 1989 - Albert Faucher, MSRC
- 1987 - Anthony D. Scott, FRSC
- 1985 - Bruce G. Trigger, FRSC
- 1983 - Malcolm C. Urquhart, FRSC
- 1981 - H. Gordon Skilling, FRSC
- 1979 - Marc-Adélard Tremblay, MSRC
- 1977 - Harry G. Johnson
- 1975 - Noël Mailloux
- 1973 - Jean-Charles Falardeau
- 1971 - Jacques Henripin
- 1969 - Alexander Brady, FRSC
- 1968 - Esdras Minville
- 1967 - W.A. Mackintosh, FRSC

== See also ==
- List of social sciences awards
