= Prix Léon-Gérin =

Social science prize in Quebec, Canada

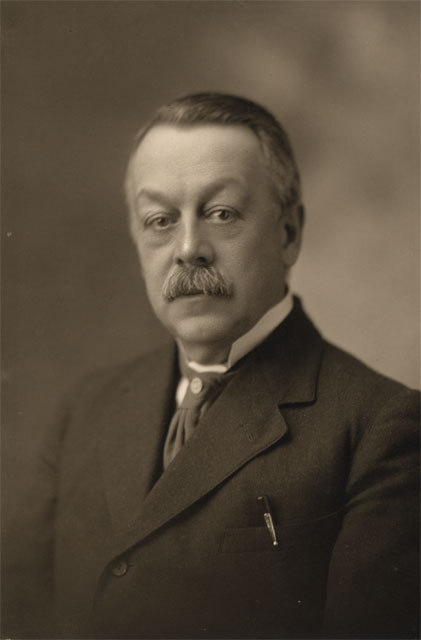
Léon Gérin, circa 1920

The Prix Léon-Gérin is an award by the Government of Quebec that is part of the Prix du Québec, which "goes to researchers in one of the social sciences". It is named in honour of Léon Gérin.

== Winners ==
- 1977 - Léon Dion
- 1978 - Marcel Rioux
- 1979 - Noël Mailloux
- 1980 - François-Albert Angers
- 1981 - Benoît Lacroix
- 1982 - Jacques Henripin
- 1983 - Michel Brunet
- 1984 - Jean-Charles Falardeau
- 1985 - Albert Faucher
- 1986 - Adrien Pinard
- 1987 - Louis-Edmond Hamelin
- 1988 - Thérèse Gouin Décarie
- 1989 - Gérard Bergeron
- 1990 - Fernand Dumont
- 1991 - Bruce Graham Trigger
- 1992 - Charles Taylor
- 1993 - Gérard Bouchard
- 1994 - Jean-Jacques Nattiez
- 1995 - Guy Rocher
- 1996 - Henry Mintzberg
- 1997 - Vincent Lemieux
- 1998 - Margaret Lock
- 1999 - Marcel Dagenais
- 2000 - Michael Brecher
- 2001 - Marcel Trudel
- 2002 - Paul-André Crépeau
- 2003 - Andrée Lajoie
- 2004 - Henri Dorion
- 2005 - Marc Angenot
- 2006 - H. Patrick Glenn
- 2007 - Richard Tremblay
- 2008 - Jean-Marie Dufour
- 2009 - Gilles Bibeau
- 2010 - Nancy J. Adler
- 2011 - Paul-André Crépeau
- 2012 - Paul-André Linteau
- 2013 - Marcel Fournier
- 2014 - Marc Le Blanc
- 2015 - Marcel Boyer
- 2016 - John A. Hall
- 2017 - André Gaudreault
- 2018 - Yves Gingras
- 2019 - Claudia Mitchell
- 2020 - Charles Morin
- 2021 - André Blais
- 2022 - Gérard Duhaime
- 2023 - Jane Jenson
- 2024 - Robert J. Vallerand

== See also ==
- List of social sciences awards
