= Melissa Steyn =

South African academic

Professor Melissa Steyn
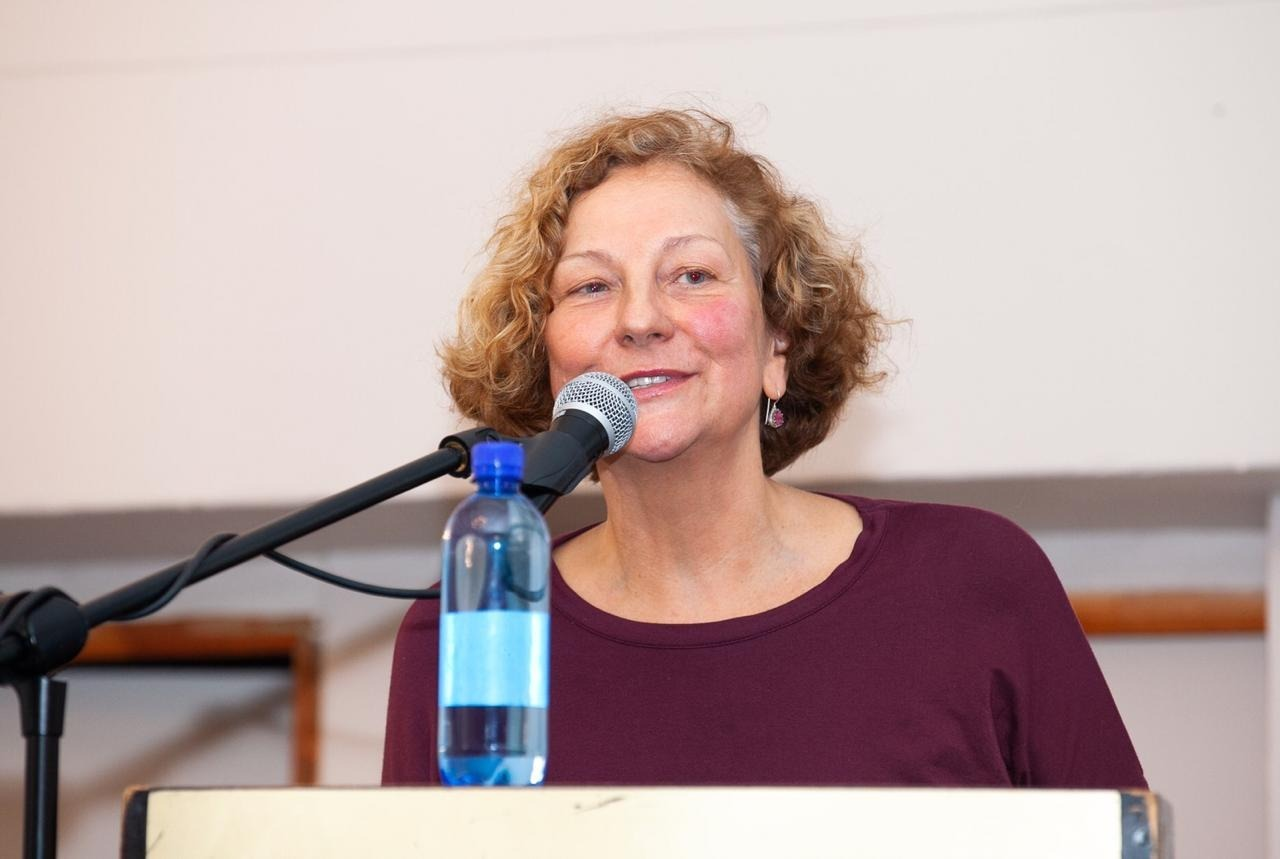
- Steyn in 2021
- Occupation: South African Research Chair
- Known for: critical race theory; critical whiteness studies; racial, gender and class inequalities; interracial families
- Scientific career
- Fields: Anthropology; Cultural theory; Gender studies; Sociology
- Workplaces: University of the Witwatersrand

Melissa Steyn is a South African academic based at the University of the Witwatersrand, Johannesburg. Prior to moving to Johannesburg in 2011, she taught at the University of Cape Town.

== Life ==
Steyn obtained her BA in 1977 from the University of South Africa, passing all her subjects, bar one, with distinction. In 1982, she completed a BA Honours in English Literature, Cum Laude, from Stellenbosch University. Having been awarded a Fulbright Scholarship to pursue a master's degree in Intercultural Communication at Arizona State University in the US, she graduated in 1996 as the top graduate in Communication Studies and in the College of Journalism and Communication, and as a member of Phi Beta Kappa. Her master's thesis Whiteness Just Isn’t What it Used to Be: White Identity in a Changing South Africa was published as a book by the same title by SUNY Press in 2001 and won the 2002 Outstanding Scholarship Award in International and Intercultural Communication from the National Communication Association in the United States. While in the US, Steyn studied at the Summer Institute for Intercultural Communication in Portland, Oregon in 1995 and 1996. She obtained her PhD (Psychology) from the University of Cape Town in 2004.

Her late husband, Reggie September (1923–2013), was a veteran of the anti-apartheid movement.

== Career ==
Steyn taught English at Stellenbosch University from 1983 to 1987. From 1988 to 2000 she was a lecturer in the Professional Communication at the University of Cape Town, which she directed in 1997–1998. In 2000 she was seconded to the Graduate School of Humanities at UCT, where she established Intercultural and Diversity Studies (iNCUDISA). In 2011, she moved to Johannesburg and joined the University of the Witwatersrand, where she was a professor in the Sociology Department. In 2014, she established the Wits Centre for Diversity Studies and in the same year was awarded the South African Research Chair (SARChI) in Critical Diversity Studies, a position which she still holds.

Steyn has served in numerous capacities on bodies promoting social justice issues. She is a member of the steering committee of the National Action Plan to Combat Racism, Racial Discrimination, Xenophobia and Related Intolerance; she was a member of the South African Ministerial Committee on Diversity in Textbooks (2017–8); and served as an expert witness to the South African Section 59 investigation inquiry into allegations of unfair Racial Discrimination and Procedural Unfairness by Medical Schemes (2000). She was a member of the Academy of Science of South Africa panel which produced the report on Diversity in human sexuality: Implications for policy in Africa. A consensus report on the implications of recent scientific research for policy in Africa. She was co-chair and chair of Anti-racism Network in Higher Education (ARNHE) for 10 years which organized symposia at universities across South Africa.

=== Critical whiteness studies ===
Steyn's work in Critical Whiteness Studies was seminal in drawing out both the family resemblances and differences between whiteness in South Africa and contexts where white people are the demographic majority, such as the United States. Her book Whiteness Just Isn’t What It Used to Be: White Identity in a Changing South Africa was the first full-length study on whiteness in post-apartheid South Africa and was formative of the field in South Africa. In succeeding years, Steyn has continued to study how white South Africans shape their identities under circumstances in which they do not control the political levers of state power.

== Critical diversity studies ==
Steyn has spearheaded the development of diversity studies as an academic field in South Africa. This involved the establishment of a centre at UCT (2000 - 2011) and the Wits Centre for Diversity Studies at the University of the Witwatersrand, South Africa. The framework Steyn has developed, Critical Diversity Literacy (CDL), consists of ten criteria that characterize a sensibility open to differences, informed by a consciousness of power relations and willing to act towards more just societies. The framework has informed interventions both in South Africa and in various international contexts including Switzerland, Germany, Australia, and various Southern African countries. A co-edited book on CDL in Higher Education has appeared in German.

=== International Journal for Critical Diversity Studies ===
Steyn is the founding editor of the International Journal in Critical Diversity Studies which has been published bi-annually since 2018 by Pluto Press, London.

== Awards and honors ==
- University of Southampton Diamond Jubilee International Fellowship (2014–18)
- Featured as one of Routledge's Sociology Super Authors (2013).
- Council on Higher Education/ The Higher Education Learning and Teaching Association of Southern Africa (HELTASA) National Excellence in Teaching Award (2010).
- University of Cape Town's Distinguished Teacher's Award (2009),
- Outstanding Article Award, National Communication Association, USA, International and Intercultural Division, for Drzewiecka, J. and Steyn, M. E. “Discourses of exoneration in translation: Polish immigrants in South Africa.” Communication Theory, 19 (2). (2010)
- Invited to consult as Southern African expert to the UNESCO Program, The State of the Arts and Perspectives on Intercultural Competence and Skills (2009)
- Top paper award, National Communication Association, USA, International and Intercultural Division. (2009)
- Ralph Cooley Top Paper award, National Communication Association, USA (2003)
- Outstanding Scholarship Book Award, International and Intercultural Division, National Communication Association, USA, for Whiteness just isn’t what it used to be, (2002)
- Top four paper, International and Intercultural Division, National Communication Association, USA (1997)
- Member of the Honor Society of Phi Kappa Phi (1996)
- Adell-Hancock Scholarship award from the Institute for International Education, USA.
- Award for most outstanding student in the College of Journalism and Communication, outstanding graduate student in the MA Communication Programme, Arizona State University (1996)
- Award for most outstanding graduate student in the MA Communication Programme, Arizona State University (1996)
- World fellowship from Delta Kappa Gamma Women International (1994–96)
- Fulbright Scholarship to study Intercultural Communication at Arizona State University (1994–96)

== Bibliography ==
Her co-edited books include:

- Decolonizing the Human: Perspectives from Africa on Difference and Oppression (2021, Wits University Press)
- Differences at work: Practising Critical Diversity Literacy (Common Ground Research Networks, 2021)
- The Prize and the Price: Shaping Sexualities in South Africa (Vol 2) (2009, HSRC)
- Performing Queer: Shaping Sexualities in South Africa (Vol 1) (2005, Kwela)
- Under construction: Race and identity in South Africa Today (2004, Heinemann)
- Cultural Synergy in South Africa: Weaving Strands of Africa and Europe (1996, Knowledge Resources).

=== Books ===
- 2021 Melissa Steyn & William Mpofu. (Eds.). Decolonizing the Human: Perspectives from Africa on Difference and Oppression. Wits University Press
- 2021 Steyn, M.E., Burnett, S. & Ndzwayiba, N. Differences at work: Practising Critical Diversity Literacy. Champaign, IL: Common Ground Research Networks.
- 2011 Steyn, M. Being different together: Case studies on diversity interventions in some South African organisations. Cape Town: iNCUDISA
- 2009 Steyn, M.E. and Van Zyl, M. (Eds.). The Prize and the Price: Shaping Sexualities in South Africa Volume 2. Cape Town: HSRC Press.
- 2005 Van Zyl, M., & Steyn, M. E. (Eds.). Performing Queer: Shaping Sexualities in South Africa, 1994-2004 Volume 1. Cape Town: Kwela Books.
- 2004 Distiller, N. and Steyn, M. (Eds) Under Construction: ‘Race’ and Identity in South Africa today. Cape Town: Heinemann. 213 pp.
- 2001 Steyn, M. Whiteness just isn't what it used to be: White identity in a changing South Africa. Albany, NY: SUNY Press.
- 1996 Steyn, M. E. & Motshabi, K.B. (Eds.). (1996). Cultural Synergy in South Africa: Weaving Strands of Africa and Europe. Randburg: Knowledge Resources.

=== Selected journal articles and book chapters ===
- 2021 Melissa Steyn mit Serena O. Dankwa. Critical Diversity Literacy: Grundlagen für das einundzwanzigste Jahrhundert. In Serena O. Dankwa, Sarah-Mee Filep, Ulla Klingovsky, Georges Pfruender (Eds.) Bildung.Macht.Diversität. Critical Diversity Literacy im Hochschulraumt. 2021. Verlag, Bielefeld. 39–58.
- 2018 Steyn, M. E. Eden recouped: White South Africans in Tanzania and Zambia. In Jolanta A. Drzewiecka and Thomas K. Nakayama (Eds.) Global perspectives on culture and communication: A reader. New York: Peter Lang Publishing.
- 2015 Steyn, M,. Critical diversity literacy. Routledge international handbook of diversity studies, 379–389.
- 2012 Steyn, M. E. The ignorance contract: Recollections of apartheid childhoods and the construction of epistemologies of ignorance. Identities: Global Studies in Culture and Power, 19(1), 8–25
- 2008 Steyn, M.E. and Foster, D: Repertoires for talking white: resistant whiteness in post-apartheid South Africa, Ethnic and Racial Studies, 31(1) 25–51.
- 2007 Steyn, M. E. As the postcolonial moment deepens: A response to Green, Sonn and Matebula. South African Journal of Psychology, 27(3), 420–425.
- 2004 Rehabilitating a whiteness disgraced: Afrikaner “white talk” in post-apartheid South Africa. Communication Quarterly, 52(2), 143–169.
- 2005 Steyn, M. E. White Talk: The strategic management of diasporic whiteness. In A. Lopez (Ed.). Postcolonial Whiteness Albany: State University of New York Press. pp. 119–136.
- 2004 Steyn M. E. Novos matizes da branquidade: an identidade braNational Communication Association, USA numa Africa do Sul multicultural e democratica. In Vron Ware (Ed.). Branquidade: identidade branca e multiculturaliso. Editora Garamond and Centro de Estudos Afro-Brasileiros (CEAB/UCAM): Rio de Janeiro. pp. 115–137.
