= Wits Centre for Diversity Studies =

Department of the University of Cape Town, South Africa

- Type: Academic department Non-governmental organisation
- Established: 2014
- Director: Melissa Steyn
- Location: Johannesburg, Gauteng, South Africa
- Campus: Braamfontein
- Affiliations: University of the Witwatersrand
- Website: www.wits.ac.za/wicds

The Wits Centre for Diversity Studies (WiCDS) was launched in 2014 and is based in the Faculty of Humanities at the University of the Witwatersrand (Wits). Initially started as Intercultural and Diversity Studies of Southern Africa (iNCUDISA) at the University of Cape Town, WiCDS was then established at Wits in 2014 and aims to build capacity to meet the challenges of diverse societies, especially in post-apartheid South Africa through interdisciplinary postgraduate education and research.

== Academic Programmes ==
The Centre presents three interdisciplinary programmes that can be undertaken by students from various disciplines, although most come from disciplines within the Humanities and Social Sciences.

- BA Honours in Critical and Diversity Studies - this programme is done by coursework and research with the objective of developing and extending critical theoretical understandings of diversity issues in society through an introduction to diversity language and terminology.
- MA in Critical Diversity Studies - through coursework and research, focuses on a deeper understanding of critical diversity and how it can be applied to professional and personal contexts, as something that is urgently necessary in all spheres of post-apartheid South African life and other global countries.
- PhD in Critical Diversity Studies

WiCDS is grounded in social justice imperatives, the research and education of the programme is informed by Melissa Steyn’s 2007 notion of Critical Diversity Literacy. The Centre has adapted the racial literacy concept developed by sociologist France Winddance Twine to analyse other axes of oppression, such as gender, sexuality, disability and class amongst others to describe the field of critical diversity studies as that which develops diversity literacy in scholars and researchers. The following are the ten criteria for critical diversity literacy:

- An understanding in the role of power in constructing differences that make a difference.
- A recognition of the unequal symbolic and material value of different social locations. This includes acknowledging hegemonic positionalities and concomitant identities such as whiteness, heterosexuality, masculinity, cisgender, able bodiedness, middle classness etc. and how these dominant orders position those in non-hegemonic spaces.
- Analytic skill at unpacking how these systems of oppression intersect, interlock, co-construct and constitute each other, and how they are reproduced, resisted and reframed.
- A definition of oppressive systems such as racism as current social problems and (not only) a historical legacy.
- An understanding that social identities are learned and are an outcome of social practices.
- The possession of a diversity grammar and a vocabulary that facilitates a discussion of privilege and oppression.
- The ability to ‘translate’ (see through) and interpret coded hegemonic practices.
- An analysis of the ways that diversity hierarchies and institutionalised oppressions are inflected through specific social contexts and material arrangements
- An understanding of the role of emotions in all of the above.
- An engagement with issues of the transformation of these oppressive systems towards deepening social justice at all levels of social organisation.

Drawing on cutting edge social theory, the critical diversity studies lens opens up challenging research questions which emerge in the interstices of current disciplinary boundaries. These questions have the capacity to shift common sense assumptions about the social, enabling fresh and penetrating analyses of current social challenges. While no single research methodology need necessarily flow from critical diversity literacy, it involves the recognition of social construction and the constitutive role of discourse in employing critical social theory.

The centre also collaborates with Pitzer College in a study abroad programme offered by Pitzer in which undergraduate students come to Southern Africa for a semester long immersive experience in Tanzania, Botswana, Zimbabwe and South Africa. During their stay in South Africa, students are hosted by WiCDS.

== Notable Events ==
Conferences - The centre hosts annual international conferences. It has hosted 5 conferences thus far. These include Troubling seasons of hate, Decolonising feminism, Doing human, (Re)Imagining Liberations and Disabling Normativities. Notable people who have spoken at the conference include Lewis Gordon, Grada Kilomba, Boaventura De Soussa Santos, Shelley Tremain and Garth Stevens.

Dialogue and debates

- Distinguished Lecture Series
- National Race Dialogues - the Wits Centre for Diversity Studies, in collaboration with the Ahmed Kathrada and Nelson Mandela Foundations hosted a National dialogue to talk about the ongoing challenges race and racism present to society.
- Hardtalk Debating Series - launched in 2014, the Centre for Diversity Studies and the Wits Debating Union co-host an annual series of public, open debates that seek to stimulate youth engagement with topical and important social issues relating to diversity, leadership, and governance.
- Talking Media Diversity Roundtables 2014 -the WiCDS & the Critical Media Diversity Studies Group presents a series of four round-tables for critical conversations around diversity of/in the media.

Paul Chappell Disability reading group - a dedication to the late WiCDS researcher, Paul Chappell, hosted twice every month for students and staff, with and without disabilities. The group provides space for people to critically engage with disability research and its application within an African context.

WiCDS Wednesdays - a series of monthly seminars that are held on the last Wednesday of the month to promote dialogue between the public and the centre on a range of diverse topics that promote transformation within the society.

HAYIBO! - a web series via YouTube presenting short videos, each portraying a different diversity issue currently playing out in South African society. Scenarios, which involved actors and members of the general public, deal with the Bystander Effect. HAYIBO! Intends to:

1. develop the capacity of individuals and communities to interrupt oppression,
2. identify and challenge the ways in which power relations linked to race, gender, sexuality, dis/ability, are expressed in everyday situations,
3. understand how silences operate to reproduce the social injustices that underlie systems of oppression.

== Publications ==
International Journal of Critical Diversity Studies
- Discipline: Discrimination, diversity ideologies, multiculturalism, social theories, gender studies, race studies
- Language: English
- Edited by: Melissa Steyn

Publication details
- History: 2018–present
- Publisher: Pluto Journals
- Frequency: Biannual

Standard abbreviations
- ISO 4: Int. J. Crit. Divers. Stud.

Indexing
- ISSN: 2516-5518 (print); 2516-550X (web)
- JSTOR: 2516550X
- OCLC no.: 1016319342

Links
- Journal homepage

The International Journal of Critical Diversity Studies is a biannual peer-reviewed academic journal covering diversity studies. It contains book reviews, original research, and theoretical articles. It is published by Pluto Journals on behalf of the WiCDS whose director, Melissa Steyn, is the editor-in-chief.
