= W. A. Mackintosh =

Canadian economist and political scientist

W. A. Mackintosh CC CMG FRSC
- Born: William Archibald Mackintosh; May 21, 1895; Madoc, Ontario, Canada
- Died: December 29, 1970 (aged 75); Kingston, Ontario, Canada
- Title: Principal of Queen's University (1951–1961)
- Spouse: Jean Mackintosh (m. 1928)
- Awards: Innis-Gérin Medal (1967)

Academic background
- Education: Queen's University; Harvard University
- Doctoral advisor: F. W. Taussig
- Influences: Guy Callendar

Academic work
- Discipline: Economics; political science
- Notable ideas: Staple thesis

William Archibald Mackintosh, CC, CMG, FRSC (May 21, 1895 – December 29, 1970) was a Canadian economist and political scientist, and was the twelfth principal of Queen's University from 1951 until 1961. He is best known for developing the staple thesis that explains Canadian economic history in terms of a series of exports of staple products – fish, fur, timber, and wheat.

Born in Madoc, Ontario, he received his BA and MA from Queen's in 1916. He received his PhD from Harvard University.

From 1922 to 1939, he was a professor of economics at Queen's. During the Second World War, he was an assistant to the Deputy Minister of Finance in Ottawa and later in the Department of Reconstruction and Supply. He was appointed a Companion of the Order of St Michael and St George in 1946.

After the war he was the dean of arts and science at Queen's until becoming principal in 1951, the first principal who was a Queen's graduate. He was a director of the Bank of Canada and a member of its executive committee.

In 1967, he was made a Companion of the Order of Canada and received the Innis-Gérin Medal, awarded for a distinguished and sustained contribution to the literature of the social sciences, from the Royal Society of Canada, of which he was a fellow and was president from 1956 to 1957.

Mackintosh-Corry Hall at Queen's is co-named in his honour.

He married Jean Isobel Easton (1902–1983) in 1928.

Academic offices
| Preceded by Robert Charles Wallace | Principal of Queen's University; 1951–1961 | Succeeded by James Corry |
Professional and academic associations
| Preceded by Robert H. Coats | President of the Canadian Political Science Association; 1936–1937 | Succeeded by Harold Innis |
| Preceded by George Sherwood Hume | President of the Royal Society of Canada; 1956–1957 | Succeeded by Thomas Cameron |
Awards
| New award | Innis-Gérin Medal; 1967 | Succeeded by Esdras Minville |
