= France Winddance Twine =

Native American ethnographer (born 1960)

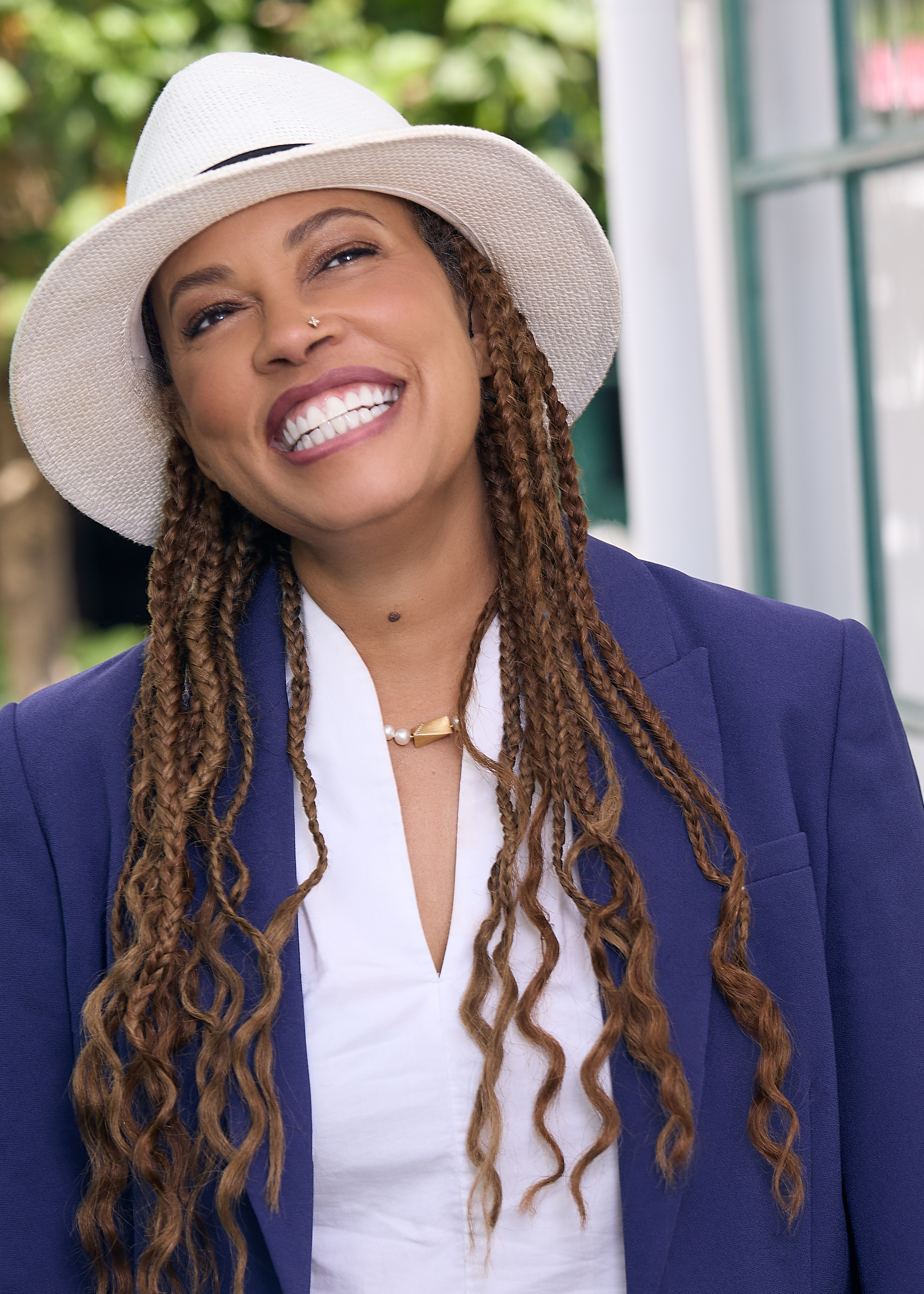
- France Winddance Twine in 2022
- Born: 1960 (age 65–66); Chicago, Illinois
- Citizenship: Muscogee Nation and U.S.
- Education: St. Thomas Aquinas Dominican High School; Northwestern University; University of California Berkeley
- Occupations: Sociologist, filmmaker
- Known for: Racial literacy, geek capital, photo elicitation interviews visual sociology; critical race theory; whiteness studies; racial, gender and class inequalities; interracial families
- Scientific career
- Fields: Anthropology; Sociology; Cultural theory; Comparative Racial Studies; Gender studies; Feminist Theory
- Workplaces: Duke University; Stanford University; University of California, Berkeley; University of Washington; University of California, Santa Barbara; London School of Economics

France Winddance Twine (born 1960) is a Black and Native American sociologist, ethnographer, visual artist, and documentary filmmaker. Twine has conducted field research in Brazil, the UK, and the United States on race, racism, and anti-racism. She has published 11 books and more than 100 articles, review essays, and books on these topics.

Through her research, she has contributed to the study of gender and sexuality, racism/anti-racism, feminism, science and technology, British culture, and qualitative research methods. In 2020, she was awarded the Distinguished Career Award by the Race, Class, and Gender section of the American Sociological Association for her contributions to sociology.

Twine is the first sociologist to publish an ethnography on everyday racism in rural Brazil after the end of military dictatorship during the abertura (return to democratic rule).

== Early life ==
A native of Chicago, she is the granddaughter of Paul Q.Twine Sr., a Civil Rights activist and founding member of the Catholic Interracial Council of Chicago, a Civil Rights organization that brought Irish, Italian, German, Polish and Black Catholics together to fight for racial justice. Her great-grandfather was William Henry Twine (1862–1933), a Creek Nation civil rights attorney who published "The Cimiter", the first black run newspaper in what was then Indian territory. Twine is a registered member of the Creek Nation (Tribal enrollment number 45464).

== Education ==
Twine earned a B.S. at Northwestern University and earned her M.A. and Ph.D. at the University of California, Berkeley. She was a research fellow in the class of 2008–2009 at the Center for Advanced Study in the Behavioral Sciences at Stanford University. In 2007, she was a distinguished visiting professor in the sociology department at the London School of Economics. She has taught and held tenured professorships at Duke University and the University of Washington in Seattle. Twine is an enrolled member of the Muscogee (Creek) Nation of Oklahoma.

She is the former deputy editor of American Sociological Review, the flagship journal of the American Sociological Association. Twine currently serves as a member of the International editorial boards of Sociology, the official journal of the British Sociological Association, and the journals Social Problems and Identities: Global Studies in Culture and Power. She has also served on the editorial board of Ethnic and Racial Studies, the highest impact peer-reviewed journal devoted to the study of racial and ethnic inequalities in the discipline of Sociology.

Twine's research examines the intersections of racial, gender and class inequalities on both sides of the Atlantic. Her recent publications include Outsourcing the Womb: Race, Class and Gestational Surrogacy in a Global Market (2015), Geographies of Privilege (2013) and Girls With Guns: Firearms, Feminism and Militarism (2012). She is the editor for the Routledge series Framing 21st Century Social Issues.

== Career ==
Twine is an ethnographer and feminist race theorist who has over 90 publications including 11 books. She has conducted field research in Brazil, Britain and the United States. Her research has been supported by the Rockefeller Foundation and the Andrew Mellon Foundation. Her recent books include Outsourcing the Womb (Routledge, 2015), Geographies of Privilege Edited by France Winddance Twine, Bradley Gardener (Routledge, 2013), Girls with Guns: Firearms, Feminism and Militarism (Routledge, 2012), A White Side of Black Britain: Interracial Intimacy and Racial Literacy (Duke University Press, 2010) and Racism in a Racial Democracy: the maintenance of white supremacy in Brazil (Rutgers University Press, 1997) and an editor of five volumes including Retheorizing Race and Whiteness in the 21st Century: Changes and Challenges (Routledge, 2011) and Feminism and Anti-Racism: international struggles for justice (New York University Press, 2000).

Her articles, film reviews and book reviews have appeared in English and Brazilian Portuguese in international journals: the Du Bois Review: Social Science Research on Race, Ethnic and Racial Studies, Estudos Afroasiaticos, Feminist Studies, Meridians: feminism, race, and transnationalism, Signs: Journal of Women in Culture and Society, Social Identities, Race and Class, and Gender and Society. Twine's current research focuses on inequality in Silicon Valley and transnational gestational surrogacy. One of her most important theoretical contributions is the concept of racial literacy which was first published in a 2004 journal article and developed in her book A White Side of Black Britain.

Twine was a scholar in residence at the Beatrice Bain Research Group from 2014 to 2015.

== Academic positions and honors ==
- 2020 Distinguished Career Award from the American Sociological Association
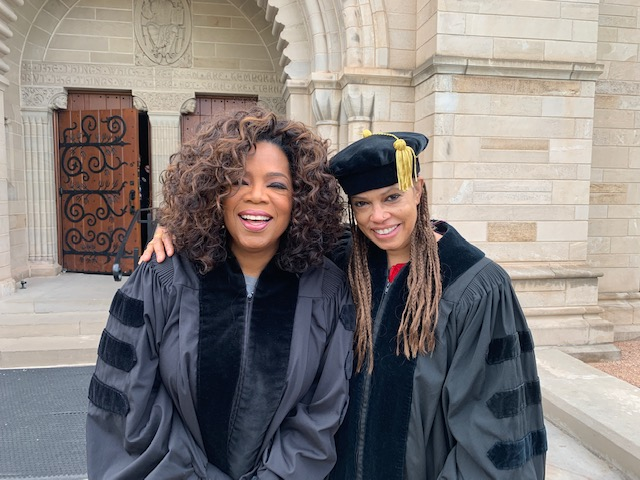
- Twine receiving an honorary degree alongside Oprah Winfrey in 2019
  2019 Doctorate in Humane Letters honoris causa from Colorado College
- 2014-2015 Scholar in Residence at the Beatrice Bain Research Group at the University of California, Berkeley
- 2008-2009 Fellow at the Center for Advanced Study in the Behavioral Sciences at Stanford University
- 2007 Visiting professor, The Gender Institute and department of sociology, the London School of Economics and Political Science
- 2002–present Professor of Sociology, University of California, Santa Barbara
- 2003-05 Professor of Sociology, Duke University (on leave from University of California, Santa Barbara)
- 2001 Rockefeller Foundation Bellagio Center Fellowship
- 1997-2002 Assistant to Full Professor of Sociology, University of California, Santa Barbara
- 1998-2000 Associate Professor of International Studies & Women Studies, Henry M. Jackson School of International Studies, University of Washington at Seattle
- 1997-1998 Assistant Professor of Sociology, University of California, Santa Barbara
- 1994-97 Assistant Professor of Women Studies, University of Washington at Seattle

== Selected publications ==
=== Books ===
- Geek Girls: Inequality and Opportunity in Silicon Valley. (2022) NYU Press. ISBN 1479803839
- Outsourcing the Womb: Race, Class and Gestational Surrogacy in a Global Market. Second edition, (2015) Routledge. ISBN 978-0415892025
- Geographies of Privilege, (2013) Edited by France Winddance Twine, Bradley Gardener Routledge. ISBN 978-0415519625
- Girls with Guns: Firearms, Feminism and Militarism, (2012) Routledge. ISBN 978-0415516730
- Retheorizing Race and Whiteness in the 21st Century: Changes and Challenges (2011) Routledge, co-edited with Charles A. Gallagher ISBN 978-0415519625
- Outsourcing the Womb: Race, Class and Gestational Surrogacy in a Global Market, (2011) Routledge. ISBN 978-0415849326
- A White Side of Black Britain: Interracial Intimacy and Racial Literacy, (2010) Duke University Press.
- Feminism and Anti-Racism: International Struggles for Justice, (2001), New York University Press, co-edited with Kathleen Blee. Routledge. ISBN 978-0814798553
- Ideologies and Technologies of Motherhood: Race, Class, Sexuality and Nationalism, (2000), Routledge, co-edited with Helena Ragone. ISBN 978-0415921107
- Racing Research/Researching Race: Methodological Dilemmas in Critical Race Studies, (2000), New York University Press, co-edited with Jonathan Warren. Routledge. ISBN 978-0814782422
- Feminisms and Youth Cultures, a special issue of Signs: Journal of Women in Culture and Society, Vol. 23, no. 3, (Spring, 1998), University of Chicago Press, co-edited with Kum Kum Bhavani and Kathryn Kent.
- Racism in a Racial Democracy: The Maintenance of White Supremacy in Brazil, (1997) Rutgers University Press. Routledge. ISBN 978-0813523651

=== Journal articles ===
- Technology's Invisible Women: Black Geek Girls in Silicon Valley and the Failure of Diversity Initiatives International Journal of Critical Diversity Studies, Vol. 1 No. 1 (2018): 58–79.
- Gender-Fluid Geek Girls: Negotiating Inequality Regimes in the Tech Industry, Gender & Society, Vol. 31, Issue 1: 28-50 (2017)
- White migrations: Swedish women, gender vulnerabilities and racial privileges, in European Journal of Women's Studies vol.18, no.1 (2011): 67–86. Coauthored with Catrin Lundstrom.
- The Gap Between Whites and Whiteness: Interracial Intimacy and Racial literacy, in Du Bois Review, vol.3, no.2 (2006): 341–363. Coauthored with Amy Steinbugler.
- Visual Ethnography and Racial Theory: family photographs as archives of Interracial Intimacies, in Ethnic and Racial Studies (a special issue on ethnography) vol. 29, no. 3 (May, 2006): 487–511.
- A White Side of Black Britain: The Concept of Racial Literacy, in Ethnic and Racial Studies, (a special issue on racial hierarchy) vol. 27, no. 6 (November 2004): 1-30.
- White Americans, the New Minority?: Non-Blacks and the Ever-Expanding Boundaries of Whiteness, Journal of Black Studies, vol. 28, no. 2: 200–218. Co-authored with Jonathan Warren
- Brown Skinned White Girls: Class, Culture and the Construction of White Identity in Suburban Communities, in Gender, Place and Culture: A Journal of Feminist Geography, vol. 3, no. 2 (July 1996): 204–224.
- O hiato de genero nas percepcoes de racismo: o caso dos afro-brasileiros socialments ascendentes, in Estudos Afro-Asiaticos, vol. 29 (March 1996) 37–54.

=== Film productions ===
- Just Black?: Multiracial Identity in the U.S., (1990), with J. Warren and F. Ferrandiz, New York, Filmakers Library
