= Falardeau =

Falardeau is a surname. Notable people with the name include:

- Jean-Charles Falardeau (1914–1989), Canadian sociologist
- Johanne Falardeau (born 1961), Canadian badminton player
- Mira Falardeau (born 1948), Canadian historian and author
- Philippe Falardeau (born 1968), Canadian filmmaker
- Pierre Falardeau (1946–2009), Canadian filmmaker

== See also ==
- Saint-David-de-Falardeau, Quebec, a village in Quebec, Canada
- Falardeau (film), a 2010 documentary film about Pierre Falardeau
