= H. Gordon Skilling =

Canadian political scientist

Harold Gordon Skilling (February 28, 1912 – March 2, 2001) was a Canadian political scientist, known for his expertise on the history of Czechoslovakia and support for the Charter 77 dissident movement.

Born in Toronto in 1912, Skilling received degrees from the University of Toronto, University of London, and University of Oxford. He was part of the faculty at the University of Toronto until his retirement in 1982.

== In Czechoslovakia ==
Skilling's first visit to Czechoslovakia was in 1937, to research his doctoral thesis in Czech history from the University of London, on the topic of relations between Czechs and Germans in 19th century Bohemia. On 4 September 1937 he attended Tomáš Garrigue Masaryk's last public appearance as president, at the anniversary commemoration of the Battle of Zborov in Strahov Stadium in Prague. Working as a broadcaster for shortwave radio service Radiojournal, a forerunner of Radio Prague, Skilling was in Prague in September 1938 when the Munich Agreement was signed, and was still in the country the following March when the Nazi occupation of Czechoslovakia began. During this period he also worked on news broadcasts for NBC and CBS. Skilling left Prague in April 1939, to finish his doctoral research in Nazi-ruled Vienna.

== Post-war ==
After World War II Skilling visited the country many more times. During the communist era, Skilling was an active supporter of dissidents such as Václav Havel, who he visited at his cottage in Hrádeček, and the wider Charter 77 movement, smuggling newspapers, journals, and books into the country to encourage dissident activists, including his own book, Charter 77 and Human Rights in Czechoslovakia, which was strongly supportive of the movement. As an academic historian, Skilling produced a number of works about Czechoslovak history and culture, and collected many Czechoslovak samizdat publications, now housed in the University of Toronto library.

Skilling was awarded the Innis-Gérin Medal in 1981, a prize awarded by the Royal Society of Canada for distinguished contribution to the literature of the social sciences. In 1992, Skilling received the Order of the White Lion, Czechoslovakia's highest honour, from President Václav Havel.

== Personal life ==
Gordon Skilling's wife Sara died in 1990. They had two sons.

== Legacy ==
According to Radio Prague, "few would question [Skilling's] status as the most important North American historian of Czechoslovak 20th century history. In 2012, the centenary of Skilling's birth was marked by an international conference and exhibition about his life and work at the Museum Kampa in Prague.

== Selected works ==
- 1976 Czechoslovakia's Interrupted Revolution - on the subject of the Prague Spring
- 1981 Charter 77 and Human Rights in Czechoslovakia - a sympathetic overview of the Charter 77 movement
- 2000 The Education of a Canadian: My Life as a Scholar and Activist - autobiography
