= Women of the Klan (book) =

Book about woman of the KKK in the 1920s

Women of the Klan: Racism and Gender in the 1920s
- 1991 and 1992 dust cover
- Author: Kathleen M. Blee
- Subject: Women Indiana History - Women of the Ku Klux Klan History - 20th century Race discrimination United States - Ku Klux Klan (1915- )
- Genre: nonfiction
- Publisher: University of California Press
- Publication date: 1991
- Publication place: United States
- Media type: Print, E-book, Audio
- Pages: 220+
- ISBN: 9780520072633 0585200580
- OCLC: 22380546
- Dewey Decimal: 322.4/2/082
- LC Class: HS2330.K63 B44 1991
- Website: Publisher's website
- Includes bibliographical references and an index

Women of the Klan: Racism and Gender in the 1920s is a non-fiction book written by Kathleen M. Blee and published by the University of California Press, Berkeley, in 1991.

== Synopsis ==
The book mostly focuses on Women of the Ku Klux Klan (WKKK) in Indiana during the 1920s. The WKKK was officially established in 1923. In Indiana the Klan was a large organization with political clout. The WKKK was associated with the KKK but was an independent organization, and they tapped the Protestant community for membership. Hence, membership consisted of both prominent and typical Protestant women born on U.S. soil. Consequently, the book examines the role of women in the WKKK during the 1920s. Women were attracted to this organization because it offered them a sense of power and belonging. Also, women were involved in many aspects of the Klan, including recruiting new members and organizing events. The demise of the WKKK occurred in 1928. 78 percent of the WKKK's members were wives and daughters of KKK members.

== See also ==
- Indiana Klan
- One Hundred Percent American by Thomas R. Pegram
- The New Hate by Arthur S. Goldwag
- Women of the Ku Klux Klan
