= George Sherwood Hume =

Canadian geologist (1893–1965)

George Sherwood Hume OBE FRSC
- Born: 1 March 1893; Milton, Ontario, Canada
- Died: 24 November 1965 (aged 72); Calgary, Alberta, Canada
- Resting place: Carpenters Cemetery, Leeds and Grenville, Ontario
- Education: University of Toronto (BA); Yale University (PhD)
- Spouse: Nellie Alena Carpenter (m. 1940)
- Awards: Officer of the Order of the British Empire (1946); Fellow of the Royal Society of Canada; Barlow Memorial Medal (1926); Plummer Medal (1931); Leonard Medal (1947, 1951)
- Scientific career
- Fields: Geology, Petroleum geology
- Workplaces: Geological Survey of Canada; Department of Mines and Technical Surveys; Westcoast Transmission

George Sherwood Hume OBE FRSC (1 March 1893 – 24 November 1965) was a Canadian geologist and petroleum authority who served as Chief of the Geological Survey of Canada and Director-General of Scientific Services for the federal Department of Mines and Technical Surveys. He was a leading authority on the stratigraphy and hydrocarbon potential of the Western Canadian Sedimentary Basin.

== Early life and education ==
Hume was born on 1 March 1893 in Milton, Ontario, to William Hume and Pernina Jane Sherwood. He completed his BA in geology at the University of Toronto before serving overseas during World War I. Following the war, he pursued graduate studies at Yale University, earning his PhD in geology in 1920.

== Career ==
Hume joined the Geological Survey of Canada (GSC) in 1920, initially conducting stratigraphic mapping in Ontario, Quebec, and the Northwest Territories before shifting his primary focus to the petroleum and natural gas prospects of Western Canada. During the 1920s, 1930s, and early 1940s, his structural and stratigraphic field investigations across the Alberta foothills and plains—including the Turner Valley oilfield and the Langford Creek area—established foundational geological frameworks for Canadian petroleum exploration.

During World War II, Hume was seconded to the federal Department of Munitions and Supply as Assistant to the Oil Controller in Ottawa (1941–1945), advising on wartime fuel supply and domestic oil development. For his wartime service, he was appointed an Officer of the Order of the British Empire (OBE) in the 1946 Dominion Day Honours.

Returning to the Geological Survey of Canada, Hume was appointed Chief (Director) of the Survey in 1947. Following a term as Acting Director of Mines, Forests and Scientific Services in the Department of Mines and Resources (1949–1950), he became Director-General of Scientific Services in the newly organized Department of Mines and Technical Surveys in 1950. That same year, he was instrumental in establishing the GSC's permanent regional office in Calgary to support expanding Western Canadian oil and gas exploration. He also served as Acting Deputy Minister of the department from 1955 to 1956.

After retiring from the federal civil service in 1956, Hume relocated to Calgary and joined Westcoast Transmission Co. Ltd. as Vice-President and Chief Geologist, assessing natural gas reserves and pipeline supply across British Columbia and Alberta.

== Professional affiliations and honours ==
Hume served as president of several major North American scientific societies:

- President of the Geological Association of Canada (1952–1953)
- President of the Royal Society of Canada (1955–1956)
- President of the Geological Society of America (1956–1957)

He was elected a Fellow of the Royal Society of Canada (FRSC), was an active member of the Canadian Institute of Mining and Metallurgy, and was named an honorary member of the American Association of Petroleum Geologists. Over the course of his career, he received the Barlow Memorial Medal (1926), the Plummer Medal (1931), and the Leonard Medal of the Engineering Institute of Canada twice (1947 and 1951).

== Personal life and death ==
In 1940, Hume married Nellie Alena Carpenter in Calgary, after which they resided in Ottawa.

He died in Calgary on 24 November 1965 at the age of 72. He was buried at Carpenters Cemetery in Leeds and Grenville, Ontario.

== Selected publications ==
Hume authored roughly 75 scientific reports, memoirs, and geological maps covering Western and Northern Canada.

- Hume, G. S. (1925). Palaeozoic Outlier of Lake Timiskaming, Ontario and Quebec (Report). Geological Survey of Canada Memoir. Ottawa: Department of Mines. doi:10.4095/100851.
- Hume, G. S. (1932). Oil and Gas in Eastern Canada (Report). Geological Survey of Canada Economic Geology Series. Ottawa: Department of Mines. doi:10.4095/102443.
- Hume, G. S. (1933). Oil and Gas in Western Canada (Report). Geological Survey of Canada Economic Geology Series (2nd ed.). Ottawa: Department of Mines. doi:10.4095/102440.
- Hume, G. S.; Hage, C. O. (1941). The Geology of East-Central Alberta (Report). Geological Survey of Canada Memoir. Ottawa: Department of Mines and Resources.
- Hume, G. S. (1944). Petroleum Geology of Canada (Report). Geological Survey of Canada Economic Geology Series. Ottawa: Department of Mines and Resources. doi:10.4095/103993.
- Hume, G. S.; Ignatieff, A. (1950). Natural Gas Reserves of the Prairie Provinces (Report). Geological Survey of Canada Special Report. Ottawa: Department of Mines and Technical Surveys.
- Hume, G. S. (1954). The Lower Mackenzie River Area, Northwest Territories and Yukon (Report). Geological Survey of Canada Memoir. Ottawa: Department of Mines and Technical Surveys. doi:10.4095/101498.

Academic offices
Preceded by Duncan R. Derry	President of the Geological Association of Canada; 1952–1953	Succeeded by Duncan R. Derry
Preceded by E. W. R. Steacie	President of the Royal Society of Canada; 1955–1956	Succeeded by W. A. Mackintosh
Preceded by Walter H. Bucher	President of the Geological Society of America; 1956–1957	Succeeded by Richard J. Russell
