= Noël Mailloux =

Canadian psychologist (1909-1997)

- Born: Noël Mailloux; 21 December 1909; Napierville, Quebec, Canada
- Died: 21 January 1997 (aged 87); Quebec

Noël Mailloux, OC (21 December 1909 - 21 January 1997) was a Canadian psychologist who became President of the Canadian Psychological Association.

== Career ==
Mailloux was born in Napierville, Quebec in 1913. He was ordained a Dominican priest in 1937 and began teaching psychology at the University of Ottawa in 1939. In 1942, he was asked to establish a Department of Psychology at the University of Montreal where he remained until 1975, including 19 years as head of the department.

Mailloux was active in the Canadian Psychological Association, being elected president in 1963. He died in Quebec in 1997.

== Positions ==
- 1963: President, Quebec Psychological Association
- 1963: President, Canadian Psychological Association

== Awards ==
Awards and honours include:

- 1984 - William James Award, American Psychological Association
- 1983: Prix Noël-Mailloux, Order des psychologues du Québec
- 1979 - Prix Léon-Gérin
- 1975 - Innis-Gérin Medal
- 1966 - Léo-Pariseau Prize
- 1963 - Fellow, Royal Society of Canada
- 1955 - Fellow, Canadian Psychological Association
