= The New Hate =

American political non-fiction book

The New Hate: A History of Fear and Loathing on the Populist Right
- Author: Arthur Goldwag
- Language: English
- Publisher: Pantheon Books
- Publication date: February 7, 2012
- Publication place: United States
- Media type: Print (hardback & paperback)
- Pages: 368
- ISBN: 978-0-307-37969-6
- OCLC: 724650284
- Dewey Decimal: 306.2

The New Hate: A History of Fear and Loathing on the Populist Right is a 2012 political science and public affairs non-fiction book by the writer and editor Arthur S. Goldwag, published by Pantheon Books. The book discusses the history of conspiracy theories among right-wing populists in the United States, in particular what Goldwag considers personalized economic conspiracy theories driven by fear and hate within the radical right and the contemporary Tea Party movement.

== Background ==
The New Hate provides an overview of the history and ideology of right-wing populism. Some of Goldwag's material is based on research pertaining to his previous books: Cults, Conspiracies, and Secret Societies and The Illuminati, Skull and Bones, Black Helicopters, The New World Order. Additionally, Goldwag's research sometimes goes back centuries, delving into previous scholarship that includes The Paranoid Style in American Politics by Richard Hofstadter; Right-Wing Populism in America: Too Close for Comfort by Chip Berlet and Matthew N. Lyons; and The Politics of Unreason: Right-Wing Extremism in America, 1790-1967 by Seymour Martin Lipset and Earl Raab.

== Synopsis ==
Goldwag has produced a book that examines the rise of right-wing populism and its accompanying ideology of hate circa 2012. The book traces the history of right-wing populism from its roots to its current manifestation in the form of groups like the alt-right. Goldwag then analyzes the different forms of hate that are propagated by right-wing populists, including racism, xenophobia, anti-Semitism, and homophobia. He also explores the ways in which these forms of hate are used to justify violence and discrimination. Goldwag also effectively connects the dots between the different forms of hate that are propagated by right-wing populists. Also, Steve Weinberg, writing for In These Times quotes a passage in Goldwag's book:

The New Hate is at once the expression of a quixotic desire to turn back the clock to a mythical golden age when women and minorities and gays and foreigners were less troublesome than they are today; when the government only gave and never took; and a cynical ploy to up the turnout of Republican voters. Most of the time it’s reflexive and vindictive to its core.

== See also ==
- The Paranoid Style in American Politics
- One Hundred Percent American: The Rebirth and Decline of the Ku Klux Klan in the 1920s
- Women of the Klan (book)
