= Jean-Marie Dufour =

- Citizenship: Canadian

Academic background
- Education: University of Chicago; Concordia University; Université de Montréal
- Doctoral advisor: Arnold Zellner

Academic work
- Discipline: Econometrics; Statistics; Macroeconomics; Finance; Public finance
- Institutions: McGill University

Jean-Marie Dufour, OC (born 1949) is an econometrician and statistician from Quebec who teaches at McGill University. He has degrees from McGill University, Université de Montréal, and a PhD in economics from the University of Chicago. He also taught at the Université de Montréal. He is noted for his work on econometric methodology.

== Awards ==
- 1988 Prix Marcel-Dagenais
- 1994 John Rae Prize
- 2006 Izaak-Walton-Killam Award
- 2008 Prix Léon-Gérin
