= Kathleen M. Blee =

American sociologist

- Born: March 27, 1953 (age 73); Indiana, USA

Academic background
- Education: BA, 1974, Indiana University; MS, PhD, University of Wisconsin–Madison
- Thesis: The effect of occupational and marital mobility upon political orientation (1976)

Kathleen Marie Blee (born March 27, 1953) is an American sociologist. She is a Distinguished Professor of Sociology at the University of Pittsburgh. Her areas of interest include gender, race and racism, social movements, and sociology of space and place. Special interests include how gender influences racist movements, including work on women in the Ku Klux Klan in the 1920s.

== Early life and education ==
Blee was born on March 27, 1953. She grew up in Fort Wayne, Indiana to a Roman Catholic family and attended catholic school before enrolling at Indiana University for her Bachelor's degree. After graduating with a degree in sociology in 1974, she completed her Master's degree and PhD in the same topic from University of Wisconsin–Madison.

== Career ==
Upon completing her PhD, Blee accepted a faculty position at the University of Kentucky (UK) in 1981. While at UK, she served as Associate Dean for the College of Arts and Sciences and as Director for the Women's Studies Program. During this time, Blee began to study the emergence of women in the Ku Klux Klan (KKK) following World War I after coming across a brochure in favor of women's suffrage published by the KKK. In 1987, she began writing a book about the role of women in the KKK in Indiana during the 1920s. While researching for the book, she interviewed numerous women who were dedicated members of the KKK. The book, Women of the Klan: Racism and Gender in the 1920s, was eventually published by the University of California Press in 1991.

Blee eventually left UK in 1996 to accept a professorship position at the University of Pittsburgh's (UPitt) Department of Sociology. She also served as the Director of UPitt's Women's Studies Program from 1996 to 2001. Upon joining the faculty, she authored more books about the emerging role of women in hate groups. In 1998, she published No Middle Ground: Women and Radical Protest, a book focused on uncovering women's roles in radical and militant movements. She later co-authored The Road to Poverty: The Making of Wealth and Hardship in Appalachia with Dwight Billings and co-edited Feminism and Antiracism: Transnational Struggles for Justice with France Winddance Twine. In 2002, Blee published Inside Organized Racism: Women in the Hate Movement, a book in which she interviewed 34 women involved in the Ku Klux Klan, neo-Nazi groups, and Christian identity groups. The book dispelled numerous misconceptions about women in these movements, as she found that they were often educated, did not grow up poor, and had not suffered childhood abuse. Following the publication of these books, Blee was honored with one of the 2004 Chancellor's Distinguished Research Award by Chancellor Mark A. Nordenberg for "shaping a new intellectual and research tradition that will inspire future research agendas." She was also elected to a three-year term on the university's Senate Committee against Anti-Discriminatory Policies.

As a result of her academic scholarship, Blee was appointed a Distinguished Professor of Sociology in the School of Arts and Sciences in January 2007. She was also again recognized by Nordenberg with a 2007 Chancellor's Award for Distinguished Teaching due to her "outstanding contributions to teaching in sociology and women’s studies." Later that year, she also received one of four 2007 Provost's Award for Excellence in Mentoring after she had chaired 12 dissertation committees and advised on seven. The following year, Blee was appointed chair of the sociology department while continuing to hold her appointments in history and the women's studies program. While serving in these roles, she published Democracy in the Making: How Activist Groups Form and received the Virginia Hodgkinson Research Prize from the Association for Research on Nonprofit Organizations and Voluntary Action.

In 2017, Blee was appointed Dean of the Dietrich School of Arts and Sciences College of General Studies. While serving in this new role, she also accepted an appointment as co-director of the Collaboratory Against Hate, a center dedicated to the study and prevent hate and violence against marginalized groups. In 2022, Blee stepped down as Dean of the Dietrich School of Arts and Sciences College of General Studies and resumed her regular faculty responsibilities.

== Selected publications ==
- Democracy in the Making: How Activist Groups Form (2012)
- Inside Organized Racism: Women and Men in the Hate Movement (2002, University of California Press)
- Feminism and Antiracism: Transnational Struggles for Justice (2001, New York University Press, Edited with France Winddance Twine)
- The Road to Poverty: The Making of Wealth and Hardship in Appalachia (2000, Cambridge University Press, written with Dwight Billings)
- No Middle Ground: Women & Radical Protest (1998, New York University Press, Editor)
- Women of the Klan: Racism and Gender in the 1920s (1991, New York University Press)
