= Paul-André Crépeau =

Canadian legal academic

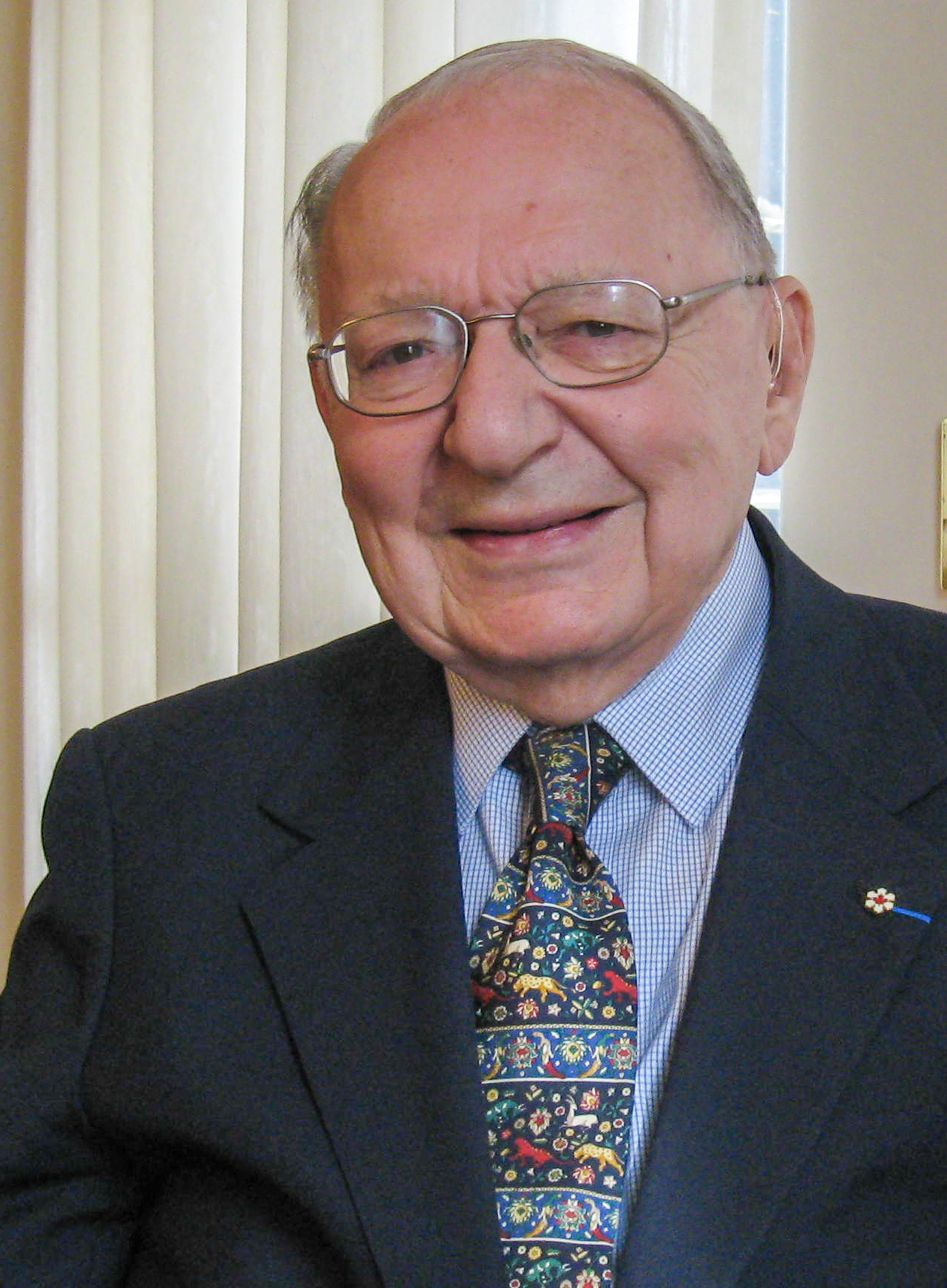
- Born: May 20, 1926; Gravelbourg, Saskatchewan, Canada
- Died: July 6, 2011 (aged 85); Montreal, Quebec, Canada
- Education: University of Ottawa; Université de Montréal; University College, Oxford; University of Paris
- Awards: Order of Canada; National Order of Quebec

Paul-André Crépeau, CC OQ FRSC (May 20, 1926 – July 6, 2011) was a Canadian legal academic who led the reforms of the Civil Code of Quebec and the Quebec Charter of Human Rights and Freedoms.

Born in Gravelbourg, Saskatchewan, he studied philosophy at the University of Ottawa. He received his legal education from the Université de Montréal. He attended University College, Oxford as a Rhodes Scholar in 1950. In 1955 he received a Doctor of Law from the University of Paris. From 1974 to 1984, he was the director of the Institute of Comparative Law at McGill University. In 1975, he founded the Quebec Research Centre of Private and Comparative Law, and served as its director until 1996. The centre was renamed the Paul-André Crépeau Centre for Private and Comparative Law in his honour in 2012.

== Honours ==
- In 1980, he was made a Fellow of the Royal Society of Canada.
- In 1981, he was made an Officer of the Order of Canada.
- In 1989, he was awarded an Honorary Doctor of Laws from Dalhousie University.
- In 1992, he was promoted to Companion of the Order of Canada.
- In 1993, he was the first winner of the Canadian Bar Association's Ramon John Hnatyshyn Award for Law.
- In 2000, he was made an Officer of the National Order of Quebec.
- In 2001, he was awarded an honorary doctorate from the Sorbonne.
- In 2002, he was awarded the Prix Léon-Gérin.
- In 2004, he was awarded the Medal of the Bar of Montreal.
- In 2008, he was awarded the Prix Georges-Émile-Lapalme.
- In 2008, he was awarded an honorary doctorate by the University of Saskatchewan.
