= Vianney Décarie =

Canadian philosopher

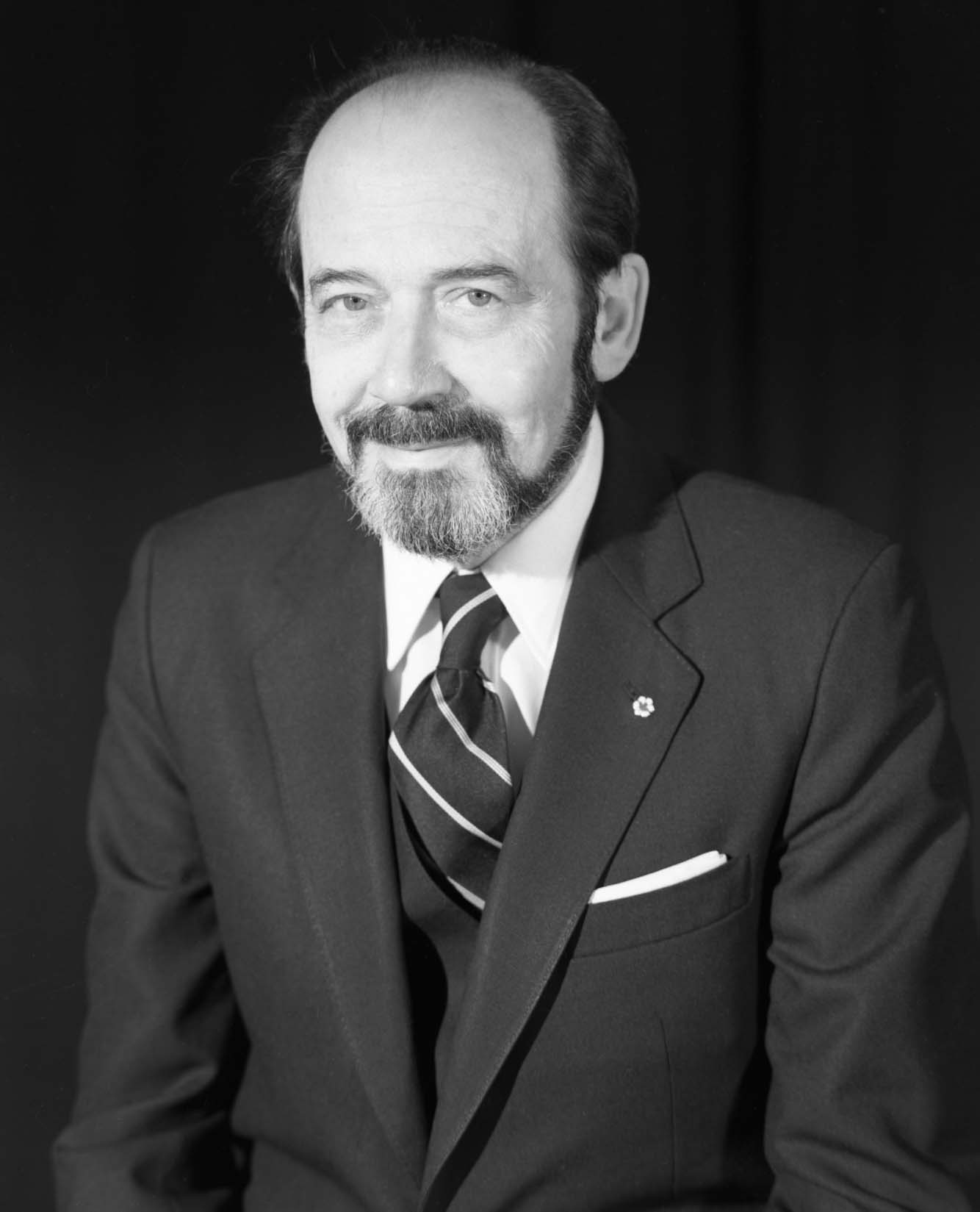
- Décarie in 1983
- Born: Joseph Fernand Lionel Vianney Décarie; November 28, 1917; Montreal, Canada
- Died: September 6, 2009 (aged 91)
- Occupation: Philosopher

Joseph Fernand Lionel Vianney Décarie, OC GOQ, was a Canadian philosopher. He was born November 28, 1917, in Montreal, Canada and died there on September 6, 2009, of pneumonia.

== Early life ==
Vianney Décarie was a descendant of an old Quebec family. His grandfather, Barthélémy Thélesphore Décarie, was a major landowner, whose farms stretched through the west end of present-day Montreal and the village of Notre Dame de Grace. The Décarie Expressway bears the family's name.

== Career ==
At 17, he won the Prix Colin de Rhétorique for the best marks in the province among the collèges classiques, the religious-run preparatory schools in Quebec.

By 1950, Décarie earned his doctorate and, in 1954, he received a Guggenheim Fellowship. He studied all of St. Thomas Aquinas's writing on Aristotle at the Widener Library of Harvard University.

The provincial government established the University of Montreal's École normale supérieure. In 1961, he was named director. The school offered a higher standard for teaching both university and high school instructors, and eventually became the university's faculty of education.

His work called for a more robust post-secondary system: a research council, better peer review and a body to implement best practices for university administrators; all of which preceded the Parent Commission.

He published L'object de la métaphysique selon Aristotle, one of the most important books on the philosopher. He obtained the Doctorat d'État from La Sorbonne and was featured in the pages of Paris Match.

He made enemies with his political writing and general exploration. There was still resistance to open-mindedness among the clergy who ran the university. A Le Devoir editorial criticized the university for not recognizing Pierre Trudeau's value; after Décarie complained to the rector of the university, Trudeau was hired.

Décarie was an occasional writer for the political magazine Cité Libre.

Décarie also played a role in the early career of Charles Taylor, whom he hired as a professor in the early 1960s.

International philosophers such as Paul Ricoeur, Paul Vignaux and Henri-Irénée Marrou regularly spoke to his students. He was seen as an avant-garde Christians in 1960s philosophy.

He retired mandatorily at age 65. but continued to lecture, including at McGill University. He researched until two years before his death at age 91 when he suffered vascular dementia.

== Awards ==
He was awarded the Order of Canada and the Order of Quebec, of the latter named a Grand Officer, for his work promoting secular education.

== Family ==
His widow is Thérèse Gouin Décarie, a pioneering researcher on early childhood development. His children are Pascale, Dominique, Jean-Claude and Emmanuel. He went to church every Sunday, but respected his children's religious choices.

His love of language was passionate, and was moved by the construction of ancient Greek words. That passion for language spilled over into a short-wave radio obsession, listening to foreign broadcasts.
