= Albert Legault =

Canadian academic and researcher (1938–2022)

- Born: 7 June 1938; Canada
- Died: 18 September 2022 (aged 84); Quebec City, Quebec, Canada
- Occupations: Professor; Researcher

Albert Legault (7 June 1938 – 18 September 2022) was a Canadian academic and researcher. He notably performed research on strategic studies and specialized in peacekeeping. He published several books on nuclear deterrence and disarmament. He worked as a professor for the Université du Québec à Montréal and the Université Laval. He held a PhD from the Graduate Institute of International Studies.

== Awards ==
- Member of the Royal Society of Canada (1977)
- Prix Marcel-Vincent (1994)
- Innis-Gérin Medal (1995)
- Member of the Order of Canada (2000)
