= Georges Dionne (professor) =

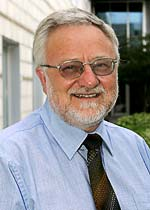
- Born: Saint-Arsène (Canada)
- Scientific career
- Fields: Economics, Finance, Insurance, Risk Management

Georges Dionne has been a professor of finance holding the Canada Research Chair in Risk Management at HEC Montréal. He has been a visiting scholar in the Department of Risk Management and Insurance at Georgia State University and in the Economics Department at Ecole Polytechnique in France for many years.

Georges Dionne has won the Kulp-Wright award (2002, 2015) for his book Handbook of Insurance, the Pierre-Laurin research prize from HEC Montréal (1998, 2003, 2009, 2016), the PRMIA award (2006), the Bank of Canada NFA Conference award (2006), an Honorary Ph.D. conferred by the University of Orléans (2006), and the GARP award at the Financial Management Association European Conference (2008). He is an Alumnus of Honor of the Faculty of Arts and Science of Université de Montréal (2008), and has been one of the 30 researchers chosen as part of the SSHRC’s celebration of 30 years of cultivating excellence in Canadian social sciences and humanities research (2008). More recently, he received the Innis-Gérin Medal (2011) for his original contribution to the social sciences in Canada and the Jean Guertin Award (2011), HEC Montréal's top prize for teaching excellence, for the support provided to his graduate students, and for having developed a new field of teaching and expertise at the School: risk management. He won the Marcel-Dagenais Award in 2012, the Roger-Charbonneau Award for the best book of the year in 2019, and was elected Fellow of the Canadian Economics Association in 2019. He received the Harris Schlesinger prize for research excellence in 2022.

Georges Dionne has published extensively, including nine books on insurance and risk management and more than 180 articles in academic journals. He has been the Editor-in-chief of The Journal of Risk and Insurance, and is member of the scientific committee for nine journals including the Journal of Risk and Uncertainty, (USA) and the Geneva Risk and Insurance Review (Switzerland). In 2018, he received the best paper award from the Journal of Operational Risk and, in 2020, the best paper award from the Risk Management and Insurance Review.

Georges Dionne led the team that developed the model for computing the Credit VaR model of a Canadian bank in 2001 and the model for computing the Operational Risk VaR of another bank in 2006. These two activities have important implications for the Basel international banking regulations. The two advance models of risk management allow banks to save capital by applying portfolio diversification strategies.

His research interests also include road safety. One of his main achievements was to propose (with Marcel Boyer) a new model for automobile insurance pricing based on drivers’ demerit points. This model was implemented by the Société de l’assurance automobile du Québec in 1992 and is still used in Quebec.

In the insurance sector, Georges Dionne has collaborated on many projects concerning detection of insurance fraud in claims. In collaboration with the Insurance Bureau of Canada, he has conducted a comprehensive study to evaluate the significance of insurance fraud in insurers’ files in Quebec. More recently, with Pierre Picard and Florence Giuliano, he has developed an internal model for fraud detection for a large European insurer. This model was able to reduce insurance fraud costs by up to 40%. With his coauthors Pierre-Carl Michaud and Maki Dahchour, he is among the first researchers to empirically separate moral hazard from adverse selection and drivers’ learning using data on insurance contracts. He also has contributed to the economic evaluation of human life for public investment projects, to the evaluation of the insurance market capacity to cover climate risks, and to the effects of inflation in the insurance sector.

== Significant contributions ==
- Dionne, G. (Ed.), Handbook of Insurance, Third Edition, 2025, Springer, Switzerland.
- Dionne, G., Corporate Risk Management: Theories and Applications, Wiley, Hoboken, USA, 394 pages, 2019.
- Dionne, G., Gestion des risques : théories et applications, Éditions Economica, Paris, France, 432 pages, 2017.
- Dionne, G. (Ed.), Handbook of Insurance, Second Edition, Springer, New York, USA, 1126 pages, 2013.
- Maalaoui Chun, O., Dionne, G., Francois, P., Detecting Regime Shifts in Credit Spreads, Journal of Financial and Quantitative Analysis, 49, 5-6, 1339–1364, December 2014.
- Dionne, G., Li, J. "When Can Expected Utility Handle First-order Risk Aversion?" Journal of Economic Theory 154, 403-422, October 2014.
- Dionne, G., Michaud, P.C., Dahchour, M., "Separating Moral Hazard from Adverse Selection and Learning in Automobile Insurance: Longitudinal Evidence from France", Journal of the European Economic Association.11, 4, 897-917, August 2013.
- Dionne, G., Pinquet, J., Maurice, M., Vanasse, C. "Incentive Mechanisms for Safe Driving: A Comparative Analysis with Dynamic Data", The Review of Economics and Statistics 93, 1, 218-227, February 2011.
- Dionne, G., St-Amour, P., Vencatachellum, D., "Asymmetric Information and Adverse Selection in Mauritian Slave Auctions", Review of Economic Studies 76, 1269-1295, October 2009.
- Dionne, G., Giuliano, F., Picard, P., "Optimal Auditing with Scoring: Theory and Application to Insurance Fraud", Management Science 55, 58-70, January 2009.
- Dionne, G., Spaeter, S., "Environmental Risk and Extended Liability: The Case of Green Technologies", Journal of Public Economics 87, 5-6, 1025-1060, 2003.
- Dionne, G., Gagné, R., "Deductible Contracts Against Fraudulent Claims: Evidence from Automobile Insurance", Review of Economics and Statistics 83, 2, 290-301, May 2001.
- Dionne, G., Gouriéroux, C., Vanasse, C., "Testing for Evidence of Adverse Selection in the Automobile Insurance Market: A Comment", Journal of Political Economy 109, 2, 444-453, April 2001.
- Dionne, G., Gagné, R., Vanasse, C., "Measuring Technical Change and Productivity Growth with Varying Output Qualities and Incomplete Panel Data," Journal of Econometrics 87, 303-327, 1998.
- Dionne, G., Gagné, R., Gagnon, F., Vanasse, C., "Debt, Moral Hazard and Airline Safety: an Empirical Evidence," Journal of Econometrics 79, 379-402, 1997.
- Dionne, G., Doherty, N., "Adverse Selection, Commitment and Renegotiation: Extension to and Evidence from Insurance Markets", Journal of Political Economy 102, 2, 209-235, 1994.
- Dionne, G., St-Michel, P., "Workers' Compensation and Moral Hazard", Review of Economics and Statistics LXXXIII, 2, 236-244, May 1991.
- Boyer, M., Dionne, G., "An Empirical Analysis of Moral Hazard and Experience Rating", Review of Economics and Statistics LXXXI, 1, 128-134, February 1989.
- Dionne, G., Lasserre, P., "Adverse Selection, Repeated Insurance Contracts and Announcement Strategy", Review of Economic Studies 70, 4, 719-724, November 1985.
- Dionne, G., Eeckhoudt, L., "Self-Insurance, Self-Protection and Increased Risk Aversion", Economics Letters, 39-43, February 1985.
- Dionne, G., "Search and Insurance", International Economic Review, 357-367, June 1984.
