= Thérèse Gouin-Décarie =

Canadian academic and psychologist (1923–2024)

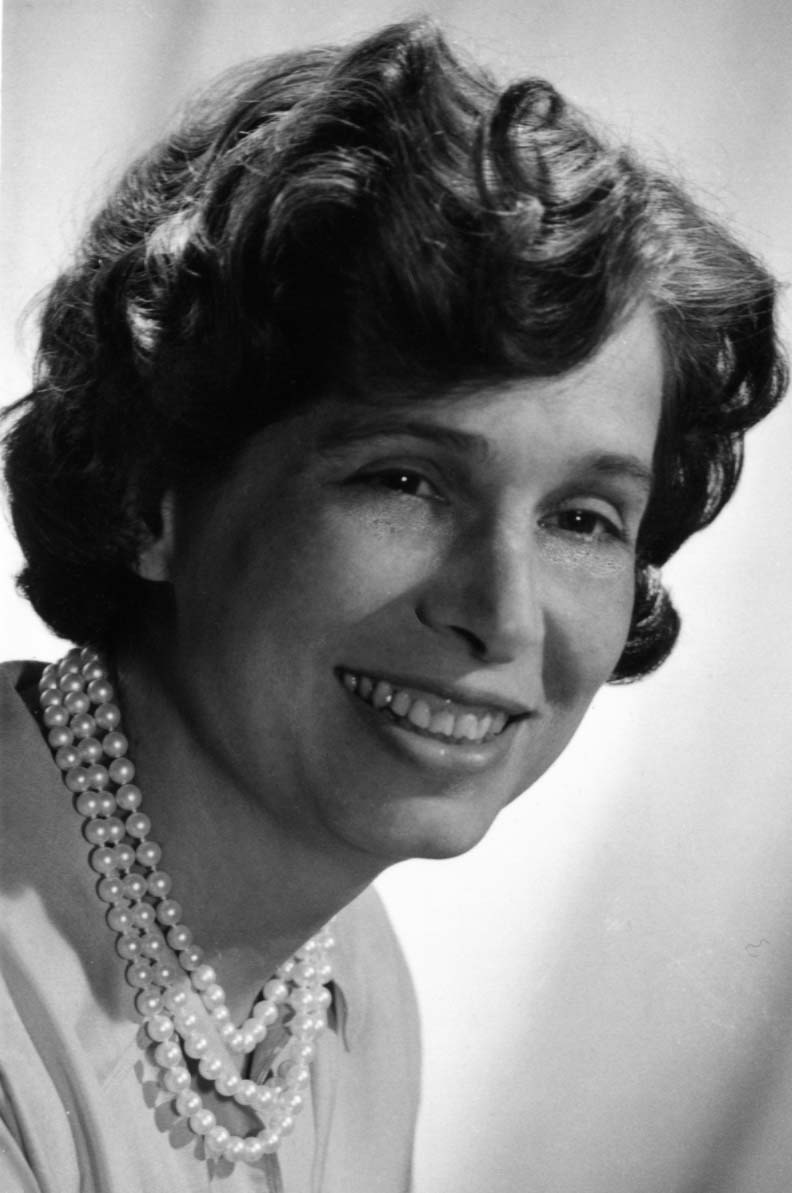
- Born: Thérèse Mercier-Gouin; September 30, 1923; Montreal, Quebec, Canada
- Died: April 2, 2024 (aged 100)
- Occupations: Psychologist, professor

Thérèse Gouin-Décarie OC OQ FRSC (French pronunciation: [te.ʁɛz.gwɛ̃.de.ka.ʁi]; September 30, 1923 – April 2, 2024) was a Canadian developmental psychologist and educator from Quebec. She is known for her work on intellectual and emotional development in young children.

== Biography ==
Gouin-Décarie was born in Montreal, Quebec on September 30, 1923, to Yvette Ollivier, an artist and playwright, and Léon-Mercier Gouin, a lawyer, professor, and Canadian senator. She studied psychology at the Université de Montréal, earning a bachelor's degree in 1945 and a master's degree in 1947. She pursued clinical training at the Centre d'orientation in Montreal (1948), at the Children's Center in Boston (1948), and at the Centre médico-pédagogique at the Université de Paris (1948–1949). In 1949, she married the Canadian philosopher Vianney Décarie.

In 1949, Gouin-Décarie returned to teach psychology and complete her dissertation at the Université de Montréal, where she would remain for the rest of her career. She completed her PhD in 1960. She earned the title of full professor in 1965 and, after her retirement, professor emeritus in 1991.

Décarie died in Montreal on April 2, 2024, at the age of 100.

== Research ==
Gouin-Décarie conducted research on children's development. Her dissertation, Emotional Intelligence in Young Children, reconciled the developmental theories of Jean Piaget and Sigmund Freud. This work was published as Intelligence and Affectivity in Early Childhood, and included a foreword by Piaget. It was later translated into several languages.

In the 1960s, Gouin-Décarie led a longitudinal study of children born to mothers who had taken thalidomide during their pregnancy. Her work assessed the psychological and emotional health of these children, and received international attention.

Gouin-Décarie's later research examined topics of early social development, including infants' responses to strangers and toddlers' perspective-taking skills.

== Awards and honours ==
In 1969, Gouin-Décarie was named a Fellow of the Royal Society of Canada. She was named an Officer of the Order of Canada in 1971. She was named a Distinguished Fellow of the International Society for Infant Study in 1990. In 1994, she was named an Officer of the National Order of Quebec.

In 1988, she was awarded the Prix Léon-Gérin. In 1991, she received the Innis-Gérin Medal from the Royal Society of Canada. She received the Prix Acfas Marcel-Vincent from the Association francophone pour le savoir for her work in the social sciences in 1986; in 2013, the prize was renamed the Prix Acfas Thérèse Gouin-Décarie in her honour.

== Publications ==
- Le développement psychologique de l'enfant., 1953
- De la̕dolescence à la maturité, 1955
- Le fasi della crescita. : Il libro dei genitori., 1964
- Intelligence and affectivity in early childhood; an experimental study of Jean Piaget's object concept and object relations. Foreword by Jean Piaget. Translated by Elisabeth Paszot Brandt and Lewis Wolfgang Brandt., 1965
- De l'Adolescence à la maturité : causeries de Radio-Collège (1953-1954), 1965
- Inteligencia y afectividad en el niño, 1970
- La réaction du jeune enfant à la personne étrangère, par Thérèse Gouin Décarie, en collaboration avec Jacques Goulet [et al.]., 1972
- The enfant's reaction to strangers, 1974
- Perceptual constancy and object permanency, 1975
- Piaget e Freud : Studio sperimentale sull'intelligenza e sulla affettività del bambino, 1976
- Le Griffiths, vingt-cinq ans après sa construction : une réévaluation des 80 premiers items : rapport final, 1981
