= Bruce G. Trigger =

Canadian archaeologist (1937–2001)

Bruce G. Trigger OC OQ FRSC
- Born: June 18, 1937; Preston, Ontario, Canada
- Died: December 1, 2006 (aged 69)
- Occupations: archaeologist and ethnohistorian
- Spouse: Barbara Welch
- Children: Isabel Trigger and Rosalyn Trigger
- Awards: Innis-Gérin Medal, Cornplanter Medal, Officer of the National Order of Quebec, Officer of the Order of Canada

Academic background
- Education: St. Mary’s Collegiate Institute; Stratford Collegiate Institute
- Alma mater: University of Toronto (B.A., 1959) Yale University (Ph.D., 1964)
- Thesis: History and Settlement of Lower Nubia (1964)
- Doctoral advisor: William Kelly Simpson and Michael D. Coe

Academic work
- Discipline: Archaeology; Anthropology; Ethnohistory
- Institutions: Northwestern University; McGill University

Bruce Graham Trigger OC OQ FRSC (June 18, 1937 – December 1, 2006) was a Canadian archaeologist, anthropologist, and ethnohistorian. He was appointed the James McGill Professor at McGill University in 2001.

== Life ==
Born in Preston, Ontario (now part of Cambridge), Trigger obtained his undergraduate education at the University of Toronto earning a B.A. in anthropology in 1959. Trigger received a doctorate in archaeology from Yale University in 1964. He was taught by George Peter Murdock and Benjamin Irving Rouse. He was co-supervised by William Kelly Simpson and Michael D. Coe. He became friends with K. C. Chang, a Chinese archaeologist, who joined the department during his final year of his PhD at Yale. His doctoral work was funded by a Woodrow Wilson Fellowship Award. His PhD thesis, entitled "History and Settlement of Lower Nubia," argued that four principle parameters determined the density of Nubia over 4,000 years: the height of floods, agricultural techniques, foreign trade and wars. He spent the following year teaching at Northwestern University and subsequently took a position as assistant professor, with the Department of Anthropology at McGill University in Montreal, and remained there for the rest of his career. He was married to Dr Barbara Welch, a British geographer trained in Physical Geography, who, despite being less known than her husband, was considered an equally sophisticated thinker.

Pamela Jane Smith writes in her obituary of Bruce Trigger that "It is little known outside Canada that Bruce had a deep and profound influence on the development of archaeology in his homeland and is seen as one of the great Canadian intellectuals along with Harold Innis, Northrop Frye and Marshall McLuhan."

== Contributions ==
Bruce Trigger contributed to a wide range of fields and wrote on many aspects of archaeology. He published over 20 books including the book "A History of Archaeological Thought" which became required reading in the discipline. Leo Klejn (2008:4, (Lev Samuilovich Klejn, known as Leo Klejn, who was an internationally acclaimed Russian archaeologist) who corresponded with him for a considerable period of time wrote of him "Since then I always felt (and said) that if there were another archaeologist in the world whose positions were the most similar to mine, it would be Bruce Trigger." Klejn described (2008:4) Bruce and his contributions after his death as: "Today no other scholar is able to skillfully embrace the whole multifaceted range of activities of this modest and calm man. There must have been something unique about his spirit or personality that inspired and equipped him to deal creatively with American Indians, Ancient Egypt, world civilizations and the theory and history of archaeology, and it is interesting to try to understand some of the principles underlying his explorations of these very different themes." The topics of his thirteen PhD students (in order R. F. Williamson (1979); Alexander D. Von Gernet (1982); Robert J. Pearce (1984); Peter A Timmons (1984); Brian D. Deller (1988); Gary Warrick (1990); William R. Fitzgerald (1990); Frances L. Stewart (1997); Eldon Yellowhorn (2002); Robert I. McDonald (2002); Stephen Chrisomalis (2003); Jerimy Cunningham (2005) and Alicia Colson (2006) reflect his wide-ranging interests. He co-supervised two PhD candidates with Fumiko Ikawa-Smith and Robin D. S. Yates (Katrinka Reinhardt 1997) and with Colin Scott (Audra Simpson 2003).

=== Archaeological fieldwork ===
While Trigger studied for his doctoral degree at Yale he was also the Chief Archaeologist for the 1962 Yale/Pennsylvania excavations at Armina West in Egyptian Nubia. These excavations were directed by William Kelly Simpson. Bruce was also the Staff Archaeologist with the 1963-1964 Oriental Institute Sudan Expedition for the UNESCO campaign.

=== Ethnohistory ===
In Canada, he was arguably best known for The Children of Aataentsic, his two-volume study of the Huron peoples, a work which remains the definitive study on the history and ethnography of that people. The Children of Aataentsic earned Trigger numerous accolades, including adoption by the Huron-Wendat Nation as an honorary member. Trigger would later reiterate some of the key arguments of the book in Natives and Newcomers, a polemical work aimed at educating laypeople. In Natives and Newcomers Trigger, writing in the tradition of Franz Boas, argued that the colonial and Aboriginal societies of early Canada all possessed rich and complex social and cultural systems, and that there are no grounds to argue that any society of early Canada was superior to the others.

=== History of archaeology ===
Trigger's book A History of Archaeological Thought investigates the history of the development of theory and archaeology as a discipline. The first version was published by Cambridge University Press in 1989. This book was described as "the first ever to examine the history of archaeological thought from medieval times to the present in world-wide perspective" A second and expanded edition of this book was published in 2006. The second book "introduces new archaeological perspectives and concerns. At once stimulating and even-handed, it places the development of archaeological thought and theory throughout within a broad social and intellectual framework."

He published a number of articles on this topic:

- Trigger, Bruce Graham 1981 Anglo-American Archaeology World Archaeology 13(2: Regional traditions of archaeological research 1): 138–155.
- Trigger, Bruce Graham 1983 American Archaeology as Native History: A Review Essay. The William and Mary Quarterly 40(3): 413–452.
- Trigger, Bruce Graham 1984 Archaeology at the Crossroads: What's New? Annual Review of Anthropology 13: 275–300.
- Trigger, Bruce Graham 1984 Alternative Archaeologies: Nationalist, Colonialist, Imperialist. Man New Series, 19(2): 355–370.
- Trigger, Bruce Graham 1986 Prospects for a World Archaeology. World Archaeology 18(1) Perspectives in World Archaeology: 1–20.
- Trigger, Bruce Graham 1994 Ethnicity: An Appropriate Concept for Archaeology. Fennoscandia Archaeologica XI: 100–103.
- Trigger, Bruce Graham 1995 Expanding Middle Range Theory. Antiquity 69: 449–458.
- Trigger, Bruce Graham 1998 ‘The Loss of Innocence’ in Historical Perspective. Antiquity 72(277): 694–698.

=== Archaeological theory ===
In Understanding Early Civilizations: A Comparative Study Trigger uses an integrated theoretical approach to look at the meaning of similarities and differences in the formation of complex societies in ancient Egypt and Mesopotamia, Shang of China, Aztecs and Classic Maya of Mesoamerica, Inka of the Andes, and Yoruba of Africa. In 2004 a session at the Society for American Archaeology (SAA) conference was dedicated to the research of Bruce Trigger.

Trigger also made significant contributions to theory and debates on epistemological issues within archaeology. The 2003 book "Artifacts and Ideas" is a collection of previously published papers that trace the history and development of these contributions.

In particular were his arguments about how the social and political contexts of research affect archaeological interpretation. One essay entitled "Archaeology and the Image of the American Indian" documents how archaeological interpretation reflected and legitimated stereotypes of Native American peoples and expressed the dominant political ideas and interests of Euro-American culture. For example, prior to 1914 Euro-American stereotypes resulted in a prehistory that saw native cultures as being primitive and inherently static. It was commonly believed that Native Americans had not undergone any significant developmental changes and that they were incapable of change. It was believed that natives had arrived in the Americas only recently, and this "fact" explained their alleged lack of cultural development. Some early Euro-American archaeologists explained away the contrary evidence of earthwork mounds as the creations of "more enlightened" non-native peoples who had been exterminated by Native American savages. These popular beliefs, supported by the claims of early archaeologists, served to legitimate the displacement of native peoples from their homelands. John Wesley Powell, who led the debunking of the mound builder myths, not coincidentally also recognized that great injustices had been perpetuated against Native American peoples. Although Trigger recognized that Euro-American political interests tended to influence and distort interpretations of the archaeological record, he also argued that the accumulation of evidence served to correct these distortions.

== Honours and awards ==
He received a number of academic awards and numerous other honours such as a Fellow of the Royal Society of Canada from 1976, he became a recipient of their Innis-Gérin Medal in 1985. In 1979 he was awarded the Cornplanter Medal. In 1991, he was recipient of the Québec Government's Prix Léon-Gérin. The Québec Government in 2001 made him an Officer of the National Order of Quebec while five years later, in 2005, he was made an Officer of the Order of Canada.

His most cherished honour was his adoption in 1989 into the Great Turtle Clan of the Wendat (Huron) Confederacy, with the name Nyemea.

Trigger died of cancer on December 1, 2006. His archive is kept at the McGill University Archives.

== Selected bibliography ==
- History and Settlement in Lower Nubia. New Haven: Yale University Publications in Anthropology, 1965.
- The Late Nubian Settlement at Arminna West. New Haven: Publications of the Pennsylvania-Yale Expedition to Egypt, 1965.
- Beyond History: The Methods of Prehistory. New York: Holt, Rinehart and Winston, 1968.
- The Huron: Farmers of the North. New York: Holt, Rinehart and Winston, 1969, revised edition, 1990.
- The Impact of Europeans on Huronia. Toronto: The Copp Clark Publishing Company, 1969.
- The Meroitic Funerary Inscriptions from Arminna West. New Haven: Publications of the Pennsylvania-Yale Expedition to Egypt, 1970.
- (with J.F. Pendergast) Cartier's Hochelaga and the Dawson Site. Montreal: McGill-Queen's University Press, 1972.
- The Children of Aataentsic: A History of the Huron People to 1660. Montreal: McGill-Queen's University Press, 1976.
- Nubia Under the Pharaohs. London: Thames and Hudson, 1976.
- Time and Traditions: Essays in Archaeological Interpretation. Edinburgh: Edinburgh University Press, 1978 (U.S. edition New York: Columbia University Press).
- Handbook of North American Indians, Vol. 15. Northeast, Washington: Smithsonian Institution, 1978.
- Time and Traditions: Essays in Archaeological Interpretation. Edinburgh: Edinburgh University Press, 1978.
- Gordon Childe: Revolutions in Archaeology. London: Thames and Hudson, 1980.
- (with B.J. Kemp, D. O'Connor, and A.B. Lloyd) Ancient Egypt: A Social History. Cambridge: Cambridge University Press, 1983.
- Natives and Newcomers: Canada's "Heroic Age" Revisited. Montreal: McGill-Queen's University Press, 1985.
- A History of Archaeological Thought. Cambridge: Cambridge University Press, 1989.
- Early Civilizations: Ancient Egypt in Context. New York: Columbia, 1993.
- The Cambridge History of the Native Peoples of the Americas [vol. I]. New York: Cambridge University Press, 1996.
- Sociocultural Evolution: Calculation and Contingency. Oxford: Blackwell, 1998.
- Artifacts and Ideas: Essays in Archaeology. New Brunswick, NJ: Transaction Publishers, 2003.
- Understanding Early Civilizations: A Comparative Study. New York: Cambridge University Press, 2003.
- A History of Archaeological Thought. 2nd ed. Cambridge: Cambridge University Press, 2006.
