= Andrée Lajoie =

Canadian jurist and academic

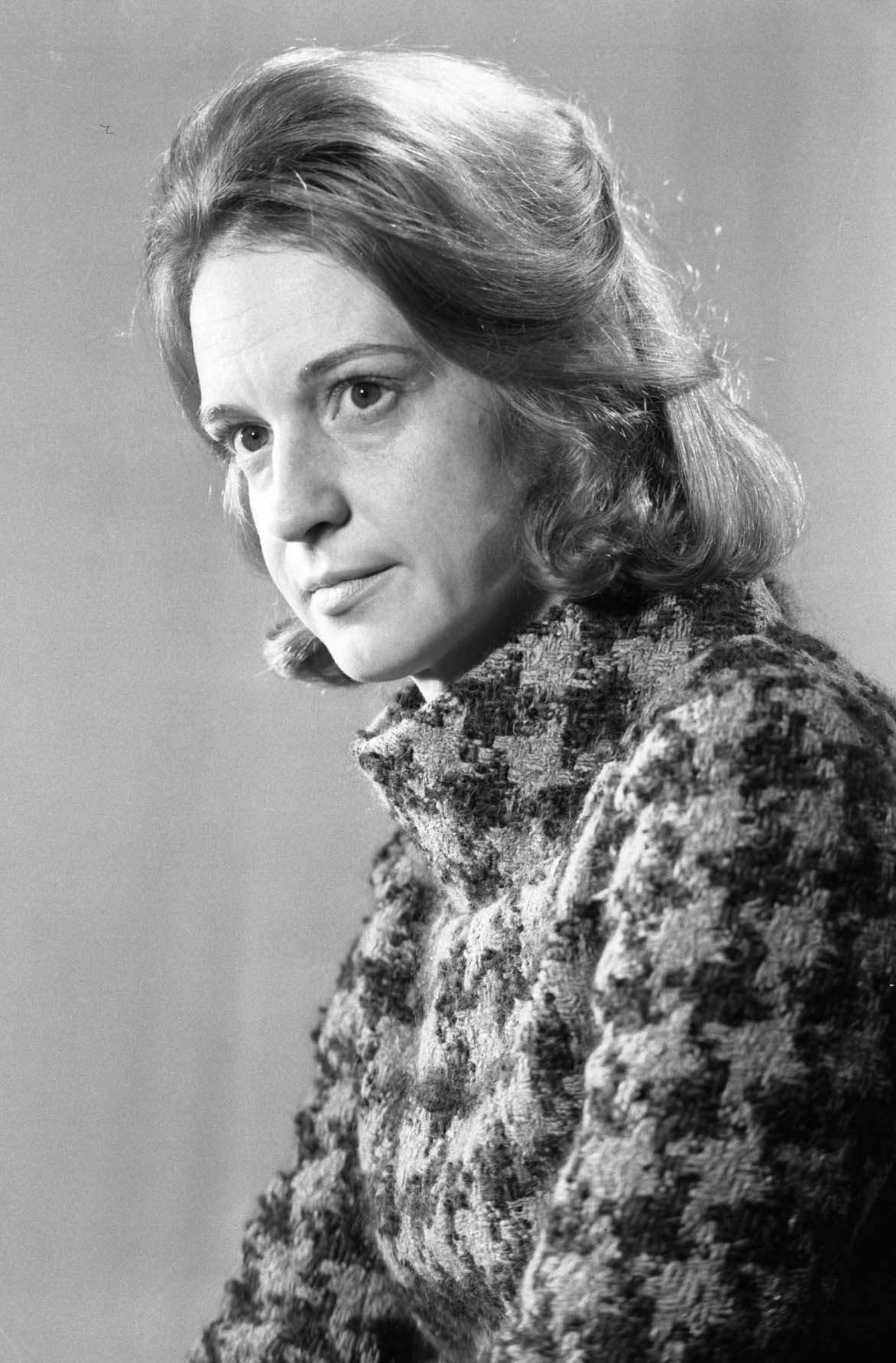
- Lajoie in 1968
- Born: October 23, 1933 (age 91); Montreal, Canada
- Occupation(s): Jurist, academic

Andrée Lajoie (born October 23, 1933) is a Canadian jurist and academic living in Quebec.

She was born in Montreal and began working as a journalist for Vie étudiante when she was 15. Lajoie received a bachelor's degree in law from the Université de Montréal and then studied political science at the University of Oxford while working as a correspondent for Radio Canada in London. In 1961, she moved to New York City with her husband, a diplomat at the United Nations.

Lajoie was a law professor from 1968 to 2006 at the Université de Montréal and a member of the Centre de recherche en droit public (CRDP) there; she also served as director of the CRDP from 1976 to 1980. She is a member of the Bar of Quebec and of the Royal Society of Canada. She has also been a visiting professor at the universities of Paris, Padua, Trieste, Athens, Toronto, Victoria, Louvain and Brussels.

She has served on the advisory council for the Law Commission of Canada and for the Séguin commission on fiscal imbalance in Canada. She also contributed to various commissions including the Castonguay and Rochon commissions on health and social services, the Macdonald Commission and the Royal Commission on Aboriginal Peoples.

In 2003, she was awarded the Prix Léon-Gérin. She also received the Prix Walter-Owen awarded by the Canadian Bar Association and the Prix André-Laurendeau awarded by the Association francophone pour le savoir.

== Selected publications ==
- Le pouvoir déclaratoire du Parlement; augmentation discrétionnaire de la compétence fédérale au Canada by Andrée Lajoie, 1969
- Expropriation et fédéralisme au Canada by Andrée Lajoie, 1972
