= One Hundred Percent American =

2011 book by Thomas R. Pegram

One Hundred Percent American: The Rebirth and Decline of the Ku Klux Klan in the 1920s
- 2011 dust cover
- Subject: Ku Klux Klan (1915- ), Racism--United States--History--20th century. United States--Social conditions--1918-1932. History, White Nationalism,
- Genre: Nonfiction
- Set in: 1920's United States
- Publisher: Ivan R. Dee
- Publication date: 2011
- Publication place: United States
- Media type: Print, Audio, E Book
- Pages: 280+
- ISBN: 9781566637114 9781566639224
- OCLC: 770861262
- Dewey Decimal: 322.4/20973
- LC Class: HS2330.K63 P46 2011
- Includes bibliographical references and index

One Hundred Percent American: The Rebirth and Decline of the Ku Klux Klan in the 1920s written by Thomas R. Pegram chronicles the rise to prominence and fall from grace of the Ku Klux Klan, during the 1920s. This book was published by Ivan R. Dee (Chicago) in 2011.

== Synopsis ==
Pegram's work results in a comprehensive history of the Ku Klux Klan during the 1920s. This is a period when the Klan experienced a resurgence of popularity. According to Pegram, the Klan's power to attract was based on its capabilities of speaking to the fears and anxieties of white Protestant Americans during a time of rapid social and cultural change, including the rise of pluralism, after World War I. The Klan's focus on white supremacy, nativism, white nationalism and traditional values resonated with many Americans who experienced duress, perceiving that their way of life was in peril.

William Vance Trollinger writing for The Journal of American History says:

"While the first Klan focused its hatred on the newly freed slaves and their Republican supporters, the second Klan offered white Protestant Americans an expanded list of social scapegoats including Catholics, Jews, and immigrants. While the original KKK was confined to the South, the new version was truly national, with perhaps 4 million members at its peak. For a few years from coast to coast America was ablaze with crosses."

Hence, the book traces the Klan's rise to prominence, its decline, and the values and beliefs handed to succeeding generations. Pegram provides a detailed account of the Klan's activities, including its use of violence, intimidation, and political influence. He also discusses the Klan's impact on American society during the 1920s and during the years afterwards, until our present day.

== Reception ==
The scholarly reviews seem to be mixed.

Trollinger, writing for The Journal of American History says that viewing the 1920s KKK and its 4 million members as outside of the mainstream, as Pegram concludes, is flawed. "Racial and religious bigotry and hatred of 'the other' are significant (albeit unhappy) features of the U.S. story," with or without the Klan.

Rebecca Barret-Fox reviewing this book for the Journal of Hate Studies says: "If [Pegram's] argument fails to make a provocative claim of its own, readers nonetheless owe him a debt of gratitude for his ability to synthesize the many narrower studies of the 1920s Klan into a general history that will interest scholars, activists, and general readers."

== Chapters ==
Below are the chapter numbers and title of each chapter:

1. The Klan in 1920s society
2. Building a white, protestant community
3. Defining Americanism: white supremacy and anti-Catholicism
4. Learning Americanism: the Klan and public schools
5. Dry Americanism: prohibition, law, and culture
6. The problem of hooded violence
7. The search for political influence and the collapse of the Klan movement
8. Echoes

== See also ==
- The New Hate by Arthur S. Goldwag
- Women of the Klan by Kathleen M. Blee
