= Fumiko Ikawa-Smith =

Canadian archaeologist

Fumiko Ikawa Smith
- Born: 10 September 1930 (age 96); Kobe, Japan.
- Occupation: archaeologist
- Years active: 20th and 21st Century
- Title: Professor Emeritus
- Spouse: Phillip E. L. Smith
- Children: one son
- Awards: Order of Sacred Treasure with Golden Rays with Rosette; Lifetime Service of the Japan Studies Association of Canada

Academic background
- Education: Tsuda College (B.A., 1953) Tokyo Metropolitan University Radcliffe College (M.A., 1958) Harvard University (Ph.D., 1974)
- Thesis: (1974)
- Doctoral advisor: Clyde Kluckhohn, Hallam Movius

Academic work
- Discipline: Archaeology
- Institutions: Tokyo Metropolitan University; University of Toronto; McGill University
- Main interests: Palaeolithic, food and nutrition, complex hunter-gatherers, gender in prehistory, social contexts of archaeology, East Asia, especially Japan
- Website: https://www.mcgill.ca/anthropology/people/retired/fumikoikawa-smith

Fumiko Ikawa-Smith is a Japanese Canadian archaeologist. She is an emeritus professor in the department of anthropology at McGill University, Montreal, Quebec, Canada. She trained as an anthropologist and prehistorian and specialises in the Early Palaeolithic cultures in East Asia, specifically Japan). She is married to Philip E. L. Smith, also an archaeologist, with one son.

== Life ==
Born in Kobe, Japan on 10 September 1930, Fumiko is the eldest daughter of the Buddhist historian, Ikawa Joukei. She studied English at an early age at the suggestion of her mother, a secondary school teacher. She graduated with an undergraduate degree from Tsuada College which subsequently became Tsuda University in 1953 with her thesis on the critical essays by T. S. Eliot.

She used her proficiency in English to secure a clerical position with Masao Oka, an ethnologist at the department of sociology at Tokyo Metropolitan University and assisted with his lectures and research. This experience led her to resign her position in 1954 in order to study anthropology as a postgraduate student at the same institution. Fumiko focused on the ancient civilisations of Central America which meant that she met Clyde Kluckhohn who in turn introduced her to American anthropology. He was in Japan in order to give a series of seminars on American Studies. This meeting caused her to take a leave of absence and obtain a Fulbright Program to study for a year at Harvard University.

Fumiko had intended to specialise in Central American archaeology under Gordon Willey. But once she studied with Hallam Movius she decided to specialise in Early Palaeolithic cultures in [Asia]. She obtained an A. M. in anthropology, from Radcliffe College, Cambridge, Massachusetts, US, in 1958. In 1959 she married Philip E. L. Smith, an archaeologist interested in prehistory whom she had met at Harvard University. In 1960 they moved to Canada, with their son, as Philip had obtained a teaching job at the University of Toronto, Ontario. She obtained her PhD from Harvard University in 1974 with her doctoral thesis on the Early Palaeolithic cultures of Japan.

== Career ==
She accompanied her husband to excavate in Egypt, on the Canadian Expedition to Egyptian Nubia from September 1962 to May 1963. The small group was headed by Philip E.L. Smith, with the title of the “Canadian Expedition to Egyptian Nubia”, was Canadian government's contribution to the International salvage archaeology efforts in connection with the Aswan Dam construction. After spending the summer in Japan, they returned to Toronto for the academic year. Upon their return to Canada when Philip, her husband resumed teaching, she was employed with the Expedition funds as research assistant to sort and label artifacts. She subsequently became a lecturer in the department of anthropology at the University of Toronto. She started teaching part-time at McGill University in Montreal in 1966 as her husband, Philip, started to teach at Université de Montréal. After a few years of part-time teaching, she was appointed assistant professor of anthropology in 1970, associate professor in 1974 and granted tenure. She obtained her PhD from Harvard University in 1974 for her dissertation on the Early Palaeolithic cultures of Japan. She was promoted to associate professor in 1975. A year after she obtained her PhD in 1975, she became the chair of the anthropology department at McGill University. She became professor in 1979.

Fumiko has two strands in her career: a university administrator and a researcher. She was the chair of the anthropology department in 1975, soon after being granted tenure and promoted to Associate Professor. She suspected that she was promoted to chair as each of the well-established full professors in the department: Peter Gutkind, Richard Anthony Salisbury, and Bruce G. Trigger might try to influence her. She is reported to have said that she thought at the time that each established academic thought he could persuade her to carry out his own agenda, as "I was a woman, a Japanese woman at that, who is supposed to be docile. I think I became a chair not "in spite of" being a woman, but "because" of being a woman.”

She was director of the Centre for East Asian Studies at McGill University between 1983 and 1988. She was the associate vice-principal (academic) of McGill University in 1991 until 1996. This was, at the time, the highest-ranking position a woman had ever been appointed to at McGill University. She later discovered that she obtained the job "because of" her gender as the vice-principal (academic), who was a male biologist, was looking for a female humanities person to be his associate vice-principal. She was appointed as associate vice-principal (academic) in 1991. This position meant that she assisted in the development of both research units by obtaining external grants to add teaching positions in the Centre for East Asian Studies and to invite numerous visiting professors from Japan. As associate vice-principal (academic) part of her duties entailed the creation of academic exchanges and collaboration agreements with universities outside of Canada, strengthening McGill's presence in Asia. She was charged to undertake this task in Asia by then principal of the university, David Johnston, latterly Governor General of Canada. She helped to establish more than dozen agreements between McGill University and universities in Japan and to create the existing programme for Japanese students to spend the summer at McGill University studying English and Canadian culture.

She is research active despite having retired from McGill University in 2003. She held two visiting professorships: one at Kwansei Gakuin University, Japan in 1996-1997 and another at El Colegio de México, Mexico City, Mexico in October 2002

== Awards ==
In May 2005 she received the Order of Sacred Treasure with Golden Rays with Rosette at the Imperial Palace in Tokyo, for her “contribution towards academic interchange between Japan and Canada, and towards increasing understanding about Japan in Canada.” She is a founding member of the Japan Studies Association of Canada founded in 1987. She served as the acting president prior to the ratification of its Constitution and several times as its president. In October 2017 she received the Inaugural award for the Lifetime Service to the Association

== Publications ==
- 1972 "1971-nen no doko: Obei (The archaeological trends during 1971: Europe and the Americas)". Kokogaku Janaru, No. 68: 66–71.
- 1976 Kyusekki bunka kenkyu no hohoron (Methodology for Palaeolithic research). Nippon no Kyusekki Bunka, edited by M. Aso, S. Kato, and T. Fujimoto, Vol. 5, pp. 19–70. Tokyo: Yuzankaku.
- September 1976 "On Ceramic Technology in East Asia", Current Anthropology 17 (3): 513-515 https://doi.org/10.1086/201773
- 1980 "Current Issues in Japanese Archaeology." American Scientist 68 (2) 134–45. https://www.jstor.org/stable/29773725
- 1982 "Co-Traditions in Japanese Archaeology". World Archaeology 13: 296–309. https://doi.org/10.1080/00438243.1982.9979835
- 1986 "Migrationism Exemplified: Migrations in Prehistory". Science 234(4780:1132–1133 https://doi.org/10.1126/science.234.4780.1132-a
- 1990 "L’idéologie de l’homogénéité Culturelle Dans l’archéologie Préhistorique Japonaise". Anthropologie et Société 14(3): 51–76. URI : https://id.erudit.org/iderudit/015143ar DOI: https://doi.org/10.7202/015143ar
- 1995 "Japanese Ancestors and Palaeolithic Archaeology". Asian Perspectives 18(1): 15–25. https://scholarspace.manoa.hawaii.edu/handle/10125/16828
- 1999 "Construction of National Identity and Origins in East Asia: A Comparative Perspective". Antiquity 73(281): 626–629. https://doi.org/10.1017/S0003598X00065200
- December 2001 Gender in Prehistory In: Pursuit of Gender: Worldwide Archaeological Approaches, edited Sarah Milledge Nelson & Myriam Rosen-Ayalon by p 323–354 Altamira: Rowman
- 2008 "ASIA, EAST | Japanese Archipelago, Paleolithic Cultures". Encyclopedia of Archaeology. Academic Press. https://doi.org/10.1016/B978-012373962-9.00230-2, accessed March 27, 2020.
- 2011 "Practice of Archaeology in Contemporary Japan". In: Practice of Archaeologies. L. Lozny, ed. Pp. 675–705. New York, NY: Springer. https://doi.org/10.1007/978-1-4419-8225-4_20.
- 2014 "Movius Line". Claire Smith, ed. Encyclopedia of Global Archaeology. Pp. 5059 – 5065. New York: Springer Reference. https://doi=10.1007/978-1-4419-0465-2_680 ISBN 978-1-4419-0426-3
- 2017 "Paleolithic Archaeology in Japan". In Handbook of East and Southeast Asian Archaeology. P Lape and J. Olsen, eds. Pp. 195–217. New York: Springer. https://doi.org/10.1007/978-1-4939-6521-2_16.

Numerous co-authored papers including:

- 1981 Ikawa-Smith, I., Jeong-Hak Kim, Richard J. Pearson, Kazue Pearson, "The Prehistory of Korea". Pacific Affairs 53(3):560 https://doi.org/10.2307/2757335
- April 1983 Seonbok Yi, G. A. Clark, Jean S. Aigner, Marie-Henriette Alimen, R. S. Davis, André Debenath, Gai Pei, Karl L. Hutterer, Fumiko Ikawa-Smith, Jia Lanpo, Kubet Luchterhand, Sarah M. Nelson, George H. Odell, H. D. Sankalia, Myra Shackley, Pow-Key Sohn, and Wilhelm G. Solheim, "Observations on the Lower Palaeolithic of Northeast Asia [and Comments and Reply]", Current Anthropology 24, no. 2 : 181–202. https://doi.org/10.1086/202964
- February 1985 Seonbok Yi, Geoffrey Clark, Jean S. Aigner, S. Bhaskar, Alexander B. Dolitsky, Gai Pei, Kathleen F. Galvin, Fumiko Ikawa-Smith, Shimpei Kato, Philip L. Kohl, Richard B. Stamps, and William B. Workman, ""The "Dyuktai Culture" and New World Origins [and Comments and Reply]", Current Anthropology 26, no. 1 : 1-20. https://doi.org/10.1086/203221
