= Racial literacy =

Racial literacy is a concept developed by sociologist France Winddance Twine. She describes it as "a form of racial socialization and antiracist training that ... parents of African-descent children practiced in their efforts to defend their children against racism" in her research done in the United Kingdom with mixed-race families.

She further describes it as "cultural strategies and practices designed and employed by parents to teach children of African and Caribbean heritage (1) detect, document, and name antiblack racist ideologies, semiotics, and practices; (2) provide discursive resources that counter racism; and (3) provide aesthetic and material resources (including art, toys, books, music) that valorize and strengthen their connections to the transatlantic culture of black people in Africa, the Caribbean and the United States".

Twine's concept of racial literacy is to be distinguished from the term 'race literacy' as conceptualized by Lani Guinier, a professor of law and critical race scholar at Harvard University. The concept of racial literacy as conceptualized by Twine refers to a set of practices designed by parents and others to teach their children how to recognize, respond to and counter forms of everyday racism. The emphasis here is on teaching children as well as adults how to identify routine forms of racism and to develop strategies for countering it and coping with it.
