= Ethnic and Racial Studies =

- Discipline: Ethnic studies, sociology
- Language: English
- Edited by: Martin Bulmer, John Solomos

Publication details
- History: 1978–present
- Publisher: Routledge
- Frequency: 10/year
- Impact factor: 0.956 (2014)

Standard abbreviations
- ISO 4: Ethn. Racial Stud.

Indexing
- ISSN: 1466-4356 (print); 1466-4356 (web)
- OCLC no.: 40348219

Ethnic and Racial Studies is a peer-reviewed social science academic journal that publishes scholarly articles and book reviews on anthropology, cultural studies, ethnicity and race, and sociology. The editors-in-chief are Martin Bulmer (University of Surrey) and John Solomos (University of Warwick). It was founded by Routledge & Kegan Paul in 1978 and continues to be published by Routledge.

According to the Journal Citation Reports, the journal has a 2014 impact factor of 0.956, ranking it 58th out of 142 journals in the category "Sociology", and 5th out of 15 journals in the category "Ethnic Studies".
