= Cultural synergy =

Cultural synergy is a term coined from work by Nancy Adler of McGill University which describes an attempt to bring two or more cultures together to form an organization or environment that is based on combined strengths, concepts and skills. The differences in the world's people are used in such a way that encourages mutual growth by cooperation.

In a more general sense, cultural synergy can be observed in the creation new or reproduced cultural forms that are distinct from the cultures from which those forms are derived. In either case, cultural synergy may be expected to be more prevalent as globalization takes place., and the concept and/or phrase can be found in discussions of globalization.

== Cultural Assimilation ==
The concept goes back in the 1970s in the USA, at a time when the American management was thought to be the one and only business model. This is what is commonly known as the concept of Ethnocentrism, which some specialist consider to be cause of the general ignorance amongst American managers towards the influence of culture on management. It was only a matter of time (after the postwar economic success of other foreign countries) until American management realised that Ethnocentrism can have negative consequences and started to incorporate different approaches for their management.

Moreover, the flow of immigrants coming to work in the USA contributed to the change of conducting management, as the managers started to consider Cultural Pluralism, a completely different view from what they were used to have, known as the "melting pot", which was based on forcing the immigrant workforce to adapt to the American culture.

== Definition of Synergy ==
The word comes from ancient Greek: synergia means working together. Andrew Campbell and Michael Goold, two British academics, define it as “links between business units that result in additional value creation”. It is, they go on to say, “a Holy Grail for large multi-unit companies”. It is something akin to the philosopher's stone: seeming to create extra value without consuming resources.

Synergy means cooperation that occurs between diverse groups of people with different viewpoints that work together. The aim of synergy is to increase effectiveness by combining various knowledge, perceptions and viewpoints together. It is a common belief that “when solving problems, groups are often smarter than the smartest people within them”. Synergy is important in business, as it gathers resources needed for successful operations and it complies with our present society where diversity is considered to be a value.

== Organizational Change ==
Organizational Change has a very broad meaning and it can be major or minor, depending on the number or individuals from a specific organization it affects. From changing the water supplier to completely transforming the marketing strategy, every change is important and has consequences.

On one hand, cultural synergy can be understood as a major organizational change, as it merges cultures and customs within a company and presumably finalises with a change of the better, creating a more solid company culture, bonding the employees.

On the other hand, the phenomenon has not been sufficiently studied and researched, and it is also known that it can be chaotic for the employees, as they are being put through unfamiliar circumstances.

== High Synergy Organizations vs. Low Synergy Organizations ==
High Synergy Organizations have employees that cooperate for mutual advantage and usually tackle their problems by following a very simple structure that focuses on identifying the problem, culturally interpreting it and finally, increasing the cultural activity. Contrary to this, there are Low Synergy Organizations that work with employees that are ruggedly individualistic and insist on solving any problem alone.

== Synergy and Cross-Cultural Communication Competence ==
Individuals from multinational organizations who follow the cultural synergy concept in today’s global economy must be aware and competent in cross-cultural communication. Previous research indicates that the effectiveness of global corporations is highly influenced by the cross-cultural competence. A more culturally diversified workforce creates a large variety of capabilities, perspectives and attitudes ) and develops more skills in problem solving, generating more creative solutions. The present postmodern society is transitioning towards a high-synergy era where the win-win and the all triumph concepts are adopted. The key-points of this system are the mutual advantage and the strong connection that people are building with each other. Commonwealth has become the main focus of social institutions which promote individual and group development. In order to give in into this postmodern era, acceptance of the high-synergy society which leads to way to better international business practices is required. “Synergy takes on increasing importance as multinational organizations, non-profit agencies, and governmental activities become more global in scope, more complex in practice, and more sophisticated in technology.”

== Examples of organizations and companies that follow the Cultural Synergy concept ==
- Shell
- Microsoft
- Autolive
- The University of Melbourne
- Deutsche Bank
- Disney Parks and Resorts
- BP
- Cadbury Schweppes
- AmBank Group
- Sara Lee
- Telstra
- Baker Hughes Inteq
