= Robert J. Vallerand =

Canadian social psychologist, academic and author

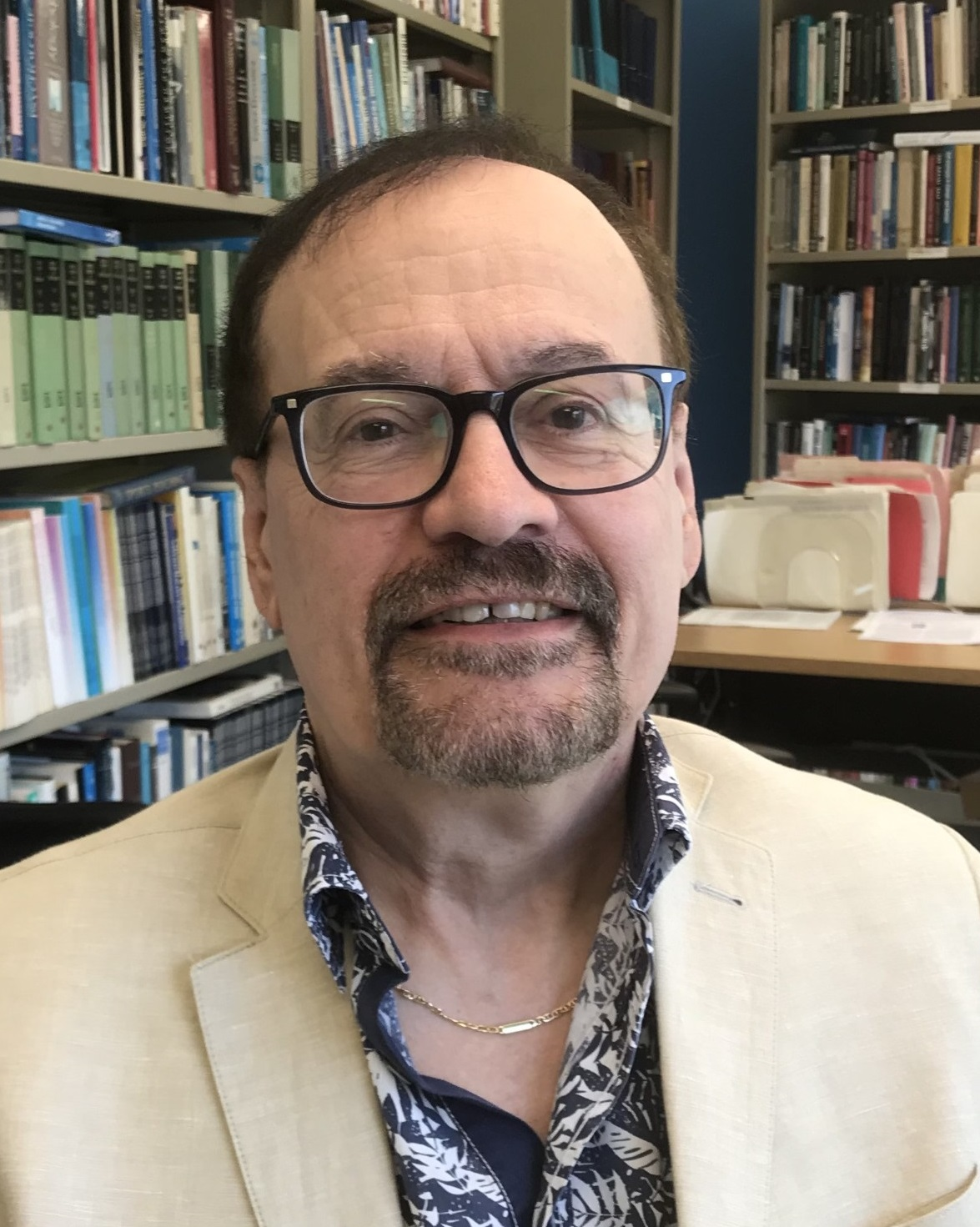
- Born: Sherbrooke, Québec, Canada
- Occupations: Social psychologist, academic and author

Academic background
- Education: BS., Physical Education (Minor in Psychology); MA., Social psychology of sport, physical activity, and health PhD., Social psychology of sport, physical activity, and health Postdoctoral studies., Experimental Social Psychology
- Alma mater: Université du Québec à Trois-Rivières; McGill University; Université de Montréal; University of Waterloo

Academic work
- Institutions: Université du Québec à Montréal

Robert J. Vallerand is a Canadian social psychologist, academic and author. He is a Full Professor of Psychology at the Université du Québec à Montréal where he holds a Canada Research Chair in Motivational Processes and Optimal Functioning and is Director of the Research Laboratory on Social Behavior.

Vallerand is most known for his research on motivational processes, having formulated theories addressing intrinsic and extrinsic motivation, alongside passion for activities. He has authored and co-authored over 500 research articles and book chapters along with 12 books and monographs such as Passion for Work: Theory, Research, and Applications and The Psychology of Passion: A Dualistic Model which received the American Psychological Association William James Book Award in 2017. Additionally, he is a recipient of the International Olympic Committee Sport Science Award (1995), the Canadian Psychological Association Donald O. Hebb Award-Career Award (2011), the Christopher Peterson Gold Medal Award from the International Positive Psychology Association (2017), the International Society for Self and Identity Distinguished Lifetime Career Award (2022), the International TANG Prize (2022), and the Canadian Psychological Association Gold Medal Award for Distinguished Lifetime Contributions to Canadian Psychology (2023).

Vallerand is a Fellow of the American Psychological Association, the Canadian Psychological Association, the Association for Psychological Science, the Society for Personality and Social Psychology, the International Association of Applied Psychology, and the Royal Society of Canada. He served as the Associate Editor-in-Chief of the Revue Canadienne des Sciences du Comportement/Canadian Journal of Behavioural Sciences.

== Education ==
Vallerand earned a bachelor's degree in Physical Education with a minor in Psychology from the Université du Québec à Trois-Rivières in 1977 followed by a master's degree in Social Psychology of Physical Activity and Health from McGill University in 1979. In 1981, he obtained a PhD in the Social Psychology of Sport, Physical Activity, and Health from the Université de Montréal, and completed his postdoctoral studies in Experimental Social Psychology at the University of Waterloo in 1982.

== Career ==
Vallerand began his academic career as an assistant professor in the Department of Psychology at the University of Guelph in 1982. He then moved to the Université du Québec à Montréal in 1983 where he is Full Professor of Psychology. In 1994, he worked as an Invited Professor at McGill University and was later appointed adjunct professor at the University of Moncton from 1996 to 2002 and Professorial Fellow at the Institute of Positive Psychology and Education at the University of Sydney (Australia) (2014–2017). He also served as Full Professor and Chair of the Department of Educational and Counselling Psychology at McGill University from 2013 to 2014.

Vallerand chaired the Department of Psychology at the Université du Québec à Montréal from 1991 to 1994, as well as the Department of Educational and Counselling Psychology from 2013 to 2014 at McGill University, where he subsequently held the Canada Research Chair until 2014. Since 2016, he has held the Canada Research Chair in Motivational Processes and Optimal Functioning, and is Director of the Research Laboratory on Social Behavior at the Université du Québec à Montréal.

Vallerand served as President of the Québec Society for Research in Psychology (1988–1991), the Canadian Psychological Association (2006–2007), and the International Positive Psychology Association (2011–2013).

== Research ==
Vallerand has contributed to the field of social psychology by studying the role of motivation and passion in optimal functioning and identity, with a focus on education, work and sports.

== Works ==
Vallerand has written on the psychology of passion and motivation science. He introduced the Dualistic Model of Passion, exploring how harmonious and obsessive passion influences various psychological phenomena in his book The Psychology of Passion: A Dualistic Model, which was called an "outstanding monograph" by Cynthia L.S. Purin and Benjamin P. Hardy. Later, he co-edited Passion for Work: Theory, Research, and Applications with Nathalie Houlfort, examining the effects of work passion, focusing on its positive and negative aspects using the Dualistic Model of Passion. He has also published several works in French such as Les Fondements de la Psychologie Sociale, about which Roxane de la Sablonnière said, "...it was it in its first edition and remains with this one a "must" for whoever is interested in social psychology. The foundations of social psychology can definitively and without any doubt be classified as a "classic"."

=== Motivation ===
Vallerand studied the measures of motivation while also looking into the relationship between motivation and self-determination. He presented a hierarchical model of intrinsic and extrinsic motivation, offering a framework to explain the interactional processes involving personality, social, and task factors affecting motivation. With colleagues and former students, he has developed motivation measures such as the Academic Motivation Scale (AMS) as well as the Sport Motivation Scale (SMS) for examining motivation types in sports and education. In addition, with Frédéric Guay and Céline Blanchard, he proposed the Situational Motivation Scale (SIMS), a measure of state intrinsic motivation, identify introjected, and external regulation, and amotivation across various settings, with the scales being used worldwide.

Vallerand explored how motivation can affect a number of real-life phenomena. Thus, he developed a motivational model of high school dropout, linking students' perceptions of competence and autonomy to social agents' behaviors, self-determined school motivation levels, and eventual dropout intentions and behavior. Furthermore, he outlined a motivational model for the coach-athlete relationship, highlighting how coaches' behaviors influence athletes' motivation and psychological needs.

=== Psychology of passion ===
In 2003, Vallerand developed the dualistic model of passion to study passion in different areas of people's lives. In doing so, he opened up the scientific study of passion. He defined passion for the first time and proposed a model to explain the determinants, outcomes and processes of passion. According to him, passion is defined as a strong inclination for an activity (or object, person, belief) that one loves, values, invests time and energy in, and which is part of identity. His model posited the existence of two types of passion: "harmonious" (under the person's control) and "obsessive" (that comes to control the person). Whereas, he stated that harmonious passion is posited to lead to well-being and optimal functioning, obsessive passion is expected to foster less adaptive and at times maladaptive outcomes.

== Awards and honors ==
- 1995 – Sport Science Award, International Olympic Committee
- 2007 – Adrien-Pinard Career Award, Quebec Society for the Study of Psychology
- 2011 – Donald O. Hebb Award-Career Award, Canadian Psychological Association
- 2017 – Christopher Peterson Gold Medal Award, International Positive Psychology Association
- 2017 – William James Book Award, American Psychological Association
- 2019 – Therese Gouin-Decarie Career Award in the Social Sciences, Association francophone pour le savoir (ACFAS)
- 2022 – Distinguished Lifetime Career Award, International Society for Self and Identity
- 2022 – International TANG Prize, TANG Foundation
- 2023 – Gold Medal Award, Canadian Psychological Association
- 2024 – Prix Léon-Gérin
- 2024 - Médaille Innis-Gérin – Royal Society of Canada
- 2026 - Arthur W. Staats Award - American Psychological Association United States

== Bibliography ==
=== Selected books ===
- The Psychology of Passion: A Dualistic Model (2015) ISBN 978-0-19-977760-0
- Passion for Work: Theory, Research, and Applications (2019) ISBN 978-0-19-064862-6
- Les Fondements de la Psychologie Sociale (2021) ISBN 978-2-89105-954-1

=== Selected articles ===
- Vallerand, R. J., Pelletier, L. G., Blais, M. R., Briere, N. M., Senecal, C., & Vallieres, E. F. (1992). The Academic Motivation Scale: A measure of intrinsic, extrinsic, and amotivation in education. Educational and psychological measurement, 52(4), 1003–1017.
- Pelletier, L. G., Tuson, K. M., Fortier, M. S., Vallerand, R. J., Briere, N. M., & Blais, M. R. (1995). Toward a new measure of intrinsic motivation, extrinsic motivation, and amotivation in sports: The Sport Motivation Scale (SMS). Journal of sport and Exercise Psychology, 17(1), 35–53.
- Vallerand, R. J. (1997). Toward a hierarchical model of intrinsic and extrinsic motivation. In Advances in experimental social psychology (Vol. 29, pp. 271–360). Academic Press.
- Vallerand, R. J., Fortier, M. S., & Guay, F. (1997). Self-determination and persistence in a real-life setting: toward a motivational model of high school dropout. Journal of Personality and Social psychology, 72(5), 1161.
- Vallerand, R. J., Blanchard, C., Mageau, G. A., Koestner, R., Ratelle, C., Léonard, M., ... & Marsolais, J. (2003). Les passions de l'ame: on obsessive and harmonious passion. Journal of personality and social psychology, 85(4), 756.
- Vallerand, R. J., & Verner‐Filion, J. (2020). Theory and research in passion for sport and exercise. Handbook of sport psychology, 206–229.
- Vallerand, R. J., Chichekian, T., Verner-Filion, J., & Bélanger, J. J. (2023). The two faces of persistence: How harmonious and obsessive passion shape goal pursuit. Motivation Science, 9(3), 175.
- Vallerand, R.J. (2024). The power and perils of passion in the quest for self-growth and optimal functioning. Canadian Psychology/Psychologie canadienne, 65 (2), 132.
- Vallerand, R. J., Chichekian, T., & Schellenberg, B. J. (2024). The role of passion in education. In Handbook of educational psychology (pp. 245–268). Routledge.
