= Nancy J. Adler =

Canadian academic

Nancy J. Adler FRSC
- Born: 3 October 1948 (age 78); Inglewood, California, United States
- Education: University of California, Los Angeles
- Occupations: Professor, Researcher, Artist

Nancy J. Adler FRSC (born 3 October 1948) is Professor Emerita of Organizational Behavior and Samuel Bronfman Chair in Management at McGill University in Montreal, Quebec, Canada.

== Early life and education ==
Originally from Inglewood, California, United States, she completed her undergraduate and graduate studies entirely at the University of California, Los Angeles (UCLA), beginning with a Bachelor of Arts in economics, followed by a Master of Business Administration, and finally with a Doctor of Philosophy specializing in management.

== Academic career ==
Upon joining McGill University, she taught within the Desautels Faculty of Management. She received the First Distinguished Teaching Award in 1985, followed by the Distinguished Graduate Teaching Award in 1990. In 1991, she was honored as one of Canada's top university professors with the 3M Teaching Fellow.

In 2004, she was inducted into the Academy of Social Sciences of the Royal Society of Canada.

In May 2007, she was named the Samuel Bronfman Chair in Management at McGill University.

== Selected bibliography ==
She has authored several texts, including peer-reviewed research papers, book chapters and volumes, as well as entire books. her works include:

- Adler, Nancy J. (2012) “Leadership Insight: Going Beyond the Dehydrated Language of Management” in Marshall Goldsmith, Laurence S. Lyons and Sarah McArthur (eds.), Coaching for Leadership 3e: Writings on Leadership from the World’s Greatest Coaches, San Francisco: Jossey-Bass: pp. 148–161, 297.
- Adler, Nancy J. (2012) “Leadership Artistry: Daring to Care,” Organizational Aesthetics, vol. 1 (no. 1), 2012: pp. 5–10.
- Adler, Nancy J. (2010) Leadership Insight. Milton Park, U.K.: Routledge.
- Adler, Nancy J. (2009) Team Management Revolution: New management strategy to win international competition. Japanese translation of 5th edition of International Dimensions of Organizational Behavior, translated by Kobayashisan. Tokyo: Cengage Japan/Doyukan.
- Adler, Nancy J. (2002) From Boston to Beijing: Managing with a Worldview. Cincinnati, Ohio: Thomson Learning.
- Adler, Nancy J. (1980) Cultural Synergy: The management of cross-cultural organizations

== Honours ==
Over the course of her academic career, she has received honours and awards, including:

- Queen Elizabeth II Diamond Jubilee Medal (2013)
- International Academy of Management Fellow, Barcelona, Spain (2013)
- Legends of Diversity Honoree, International Society of Diversity and Inclusion Professionals (2013)
- Prix du Quebec, Leon Gerin Award, in 2010
- Academy of Management AMLE Outstanding Article of the Year (2010)
- Georges Petitpas Award, The World Federation of People Management Associations (2010)
- Fellow of the Royal Society of Canada (2004)
- Women of Distinction (Femme de Mérite), YWCA (1996)
- Sage Award for Scholarly Contributions to Management (1996)
- Fellow of the Academy of Management (1994)
- Outstanding Achievement Award from Women in World Trade, Boston (1992)
- Fellow of the Academy of International Business (1992)
- International Leadership Award, American Society for Training and Development (1989)
