= Esdras Minville =

Canadian economist and sociologist (1896–1975)

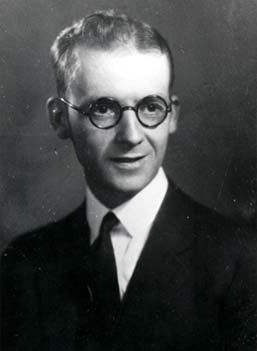
Esdras Minville

Esdras Minville (November 7, 1896 in Grande-Vallée – December 9, 1975) was a Canadian writer, economist and sociologist. He served as the Dean of the Faculty of Social Sciences at the Université de Montréal, and was the first French-Canadian to serve as head of HEC Montréal. A staunch defender of Catholic social doctrine, Minville helped to found several co-operatives in the province.

He contributed to the Rowell-Sirois Commission, and chaired the Montreal Chamber of Commerce in 1947. His nationalist ideas resembled those of Victor Barbeau, François-Albert Angers and Lionel Groulx.

== Published works ==
- Invitation à l'étude, 1943
- L'agriculture, 1943
- Montréal économique, 1943
- La forêt, 1944
- L'homme d'affaires, 1944
- Le citoyen canadien-français, 1946
- Pêche et chasse, 1946
- Les affaires: l'homme, les carrières, 1965

== Awards ==
- Honorary doctorate from the University of Ottawa
- Honorary doctorate from the Université Laval
- Honorary doctorate from the Université de Sherbrooke
- Honorary doctorate from the Université de Montréal
- Member of the Royal Society of Canada
- 1947 - Ludger-Duvernay Prize
- 1968 - Innis-Gérin Medal
