= Jean-Charles Falardeau =

Canadian sociologist (1914–1989)

Jean-Charles Falardeau OC MSRC (1914-1989) was a Canadian sociologist. He was a professor at Université Laval and then President of the Conseil des arts et des lettres du Québec in 1962. He was a Fellow of the Royal Society of Canada and Académie des Sciences Morales et Politiques. He obtained his education from Collège Sainte-Marie de Montrèal and Collège Jean-de-Brébeuf.
