= Ethnic cleansing =

Systematic removal of a certain ethnic or religious group

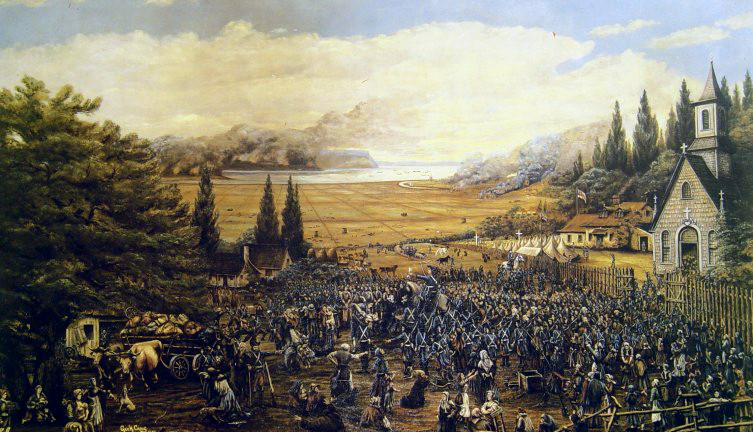
1893 painting by George Craig, depicting the deportation of the Acadians from Grand-Pré in 1755

Expulsions of Jews in Europe from 1100 to 1600

Ethnic cleansing is the systematic forced removal of ethnic, racial, or religious groups from a given area, with the intent of making the society ethnically homogeneous. Along with direct removal such as deportation or population transfer, it also includes other methods aimed at forced migration such as murder, rape, and property destruction. Both the definition and charge of ethnic cleansing are often disputed, with some researchers including and others excluding coercive assimilation or mass killings as a means of depopulating an area of a particular group, or calling it a euphemism for genocide or cultural genocide.

Although scholars do not agree on which events constitute ethnic cleansing, many instances have occurred throughout history.

The first term was first used to Croatian nationalist Ustaše genocide of Serbs of Croatia in World War II, later used to describe Albanian nationalist treatment of the Kosovo Serbs in the 1980s, and entered widespread use during the Yugoslav Wars in the 1990s. Since then, the term has gained widespread acceptance due to journalism. Although research originally focused on deep-rooted animosities as an explanation for ethnic cleansing events, more recent studies depict ethnic cleansing as "a natural extension of the homogenizing tendencies of nation states" or emphasize security concerns and the effects of democratization, portraying ethnic tensions as a contributing factor. Research has also focused on the role of war as a causative or potentiating factor in ethnic cleansing. However, states in a similar strategic situation can have widely varying policies towards minority ethnic groups perceived as a security threat.

Ethnic cleansing has no legal definition under international criminal law, but the methods by which it is carried out are considered crimes against humanity and may also fall under the Genocide Convention.

== Etymology ==
Refugees at Taurus Pass during the Armenian genocide. The Young Turk triumvirate aimed to reduce the number of Armenians to below 5–10% of the population in any part of the Ottoman Empire, which resulted in the elimination of a million Armenians.

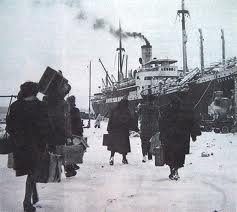
Istrian Italians leave Pola in 1947 during the Istrian-Dalmatian exodus, which followed the foibe massacres

An antecedent to the term is the Greek word "andrapodismos" (ἀνδραποδισμός; lit. "enslavement"), which was used in ancient texts. e.g., to describe atrocities that accompanied the Athenian general Chares and his seizure and destruction of Sestos in 353 and Alexander the Great's conquest of Thebes in 335 BCE. The expulsion of the Moriscos from Spain between 1609 and 1614 is considered by some authors to be one of the first episodes of state-sponsored ethnic cleansing in the modern Western world. Raphael Lemkin, who coined the term "genocide," considered the displacement of Native Americans by American settlers as a historical example of genocide. Others, like historian Gary Anderson, contend that genocide does not accurately characterize any aspect of American history, suggesting instead that ethnic cleansing is a more appropriate term. The Circassian genocide, also known as "Tsitsekun," is often regarded by various historians as the first large-scale ethnic cleansing campaign launched by a state during the 19th-century industrial era. Imperial Russian general Nikolay Yevdakimov, who supervised the operations of Circassian genocide during the 1860s, dehumanised Muslim Circassians as "a pestilence" to be expelled from their native lands. The Russian objective was the annexation of land, and the Russian military operations that forcibly deported Circassians were designated by Yevdakimov as "ochishchenie" (cleansing).

In the early 1900s, regional variants of the term could be found among the Czechs (očista), the Poles (czystki etniczne), the French (épuration), and the Germans (Säuberung). A 1913 Carnegie Endowment report condemning the actions of all participants in the Balkan Wars contained various new terms to describe brutalities committed toward ethnic groups.

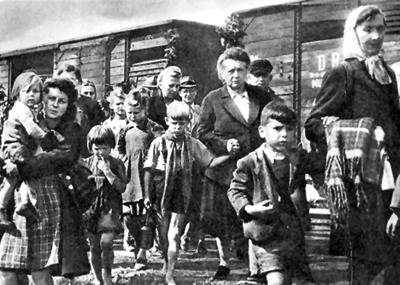
Expulsion of Germans from Czechoslovakia following the end of World War II

During the Holocaust in World War II, Nazi Germany pursued a policy of ensuring that Europe was "cleaned of Jews" (judenrein). The Nazi Generalplan Ost called for the genocide and ethnic cleansing of most Slavic people in central and eastern Europe for the purpose of providing more living space for the Germans. During the Genocidal massacres against Serbs in the Independent State of Croatia, the ethnic cleansing euphemistic čišćenje terena ("cleansing the terrain") word was used by the Croatian Ustaše to describe military actions they committed in which non-Croats were purposely systematically murdered or otherwise uprooted from their homes in order to make a homogeneous pure Greater Croatia. The term was also used in the December 20, 1941, directive of Serbian Chetniks in reference to the genocidal massacres they committed against Bosniaks and Croats between 1941 and 1945. The Russian phrase очистка границ (ochistka granits; lit. "cleansing of borders") was used in Soviet documents of the early 1930s to refer to the forced resettlement of Polish people from the 22-kilometre (14 mi) border zone in the Byelorussian and Ukrainian SSRs. This process of the population transfer in the Soviet Union was repeated on an even larger scale in 1939–1941, involving many other groups suspected of disloyalty.

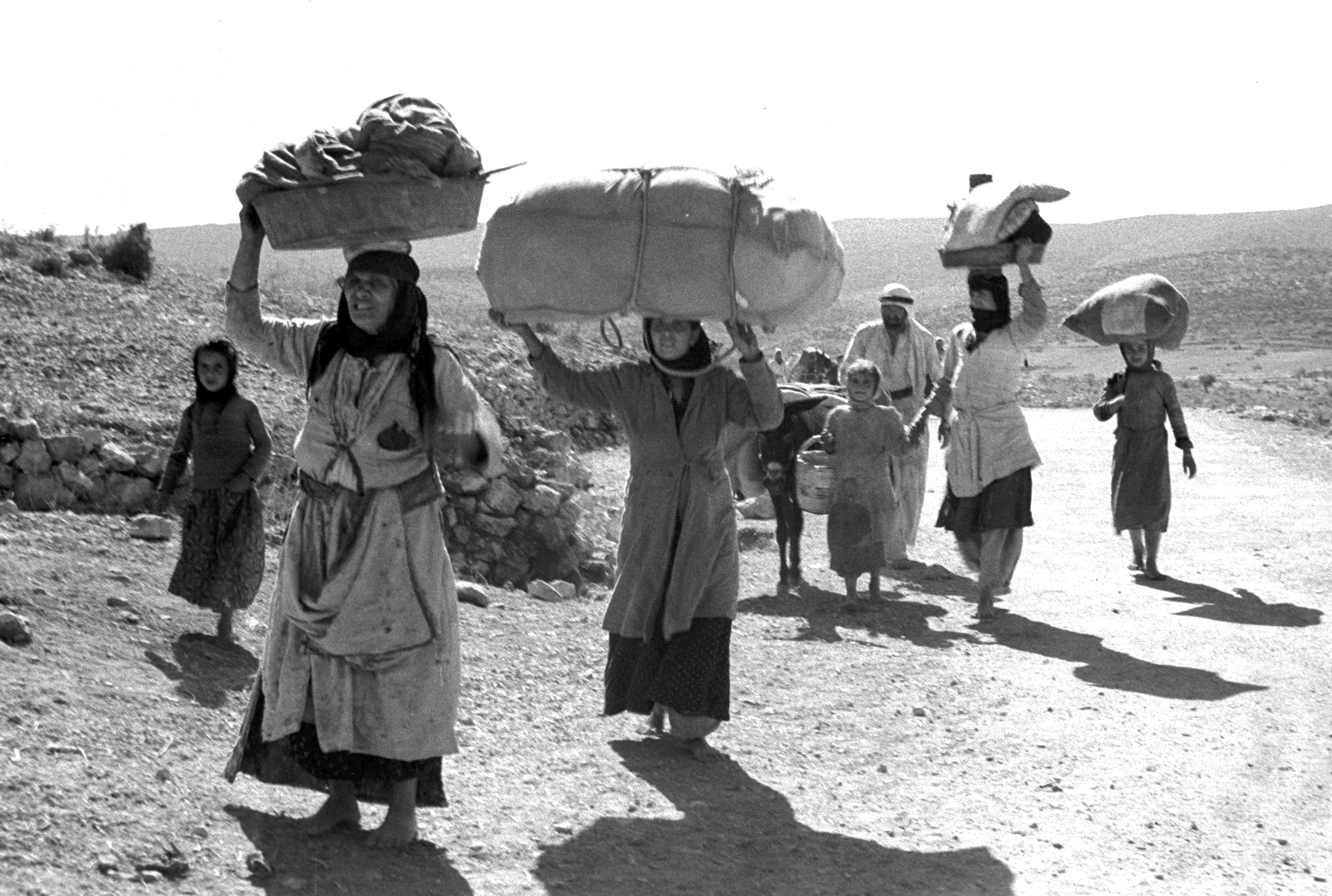
Since 1947, in an event called the Nakba, at least 750,000 Palestinians were expelled from their homes or forced to flee from what is now Israel.

In its complete form, the term appeared for the first time in the Romanian language (purificare etnică) in an address by Vice Prime Minister Mihai Antonescu to cabinet members in July 1941. After the beginning of the invasion by the Soviet Union, he concluded, "I do not know when the Romanians will have such a chance for ethnic cleansing." In the 1980s, the Soviets used the term "etnicheskoye chishcheniye", which literally translates to "ethnic cleansing", to describe Azerbaijani efforts to drive Armenians away from Nagorno-Karabakh. It was widely popularized by the Western media during the Bosnian War (1992–1995).

In 1992, the German equivalent of ethnic cleansing (German: ethnische Säuberung, pronounced [ˈʔɛtnɪʃə ˈzɔɪ̯bəʁʊŋ]) was named German Un-word of the Year by the Gesellschaft für deutsche Sprache due to its euphemistic, inappropriate nature.

== Definitions ==
The Final Report of the Commission of Experts established pursuant to Security Council Resolution 780 defined "ethnic cleansing" as:

a purposeful policy designed by one ethnic or religious group to remove by violent and terror-inspiring means the civilian population of another ethnic or religious group from certain geographic areas," [noting that in the former Yugoslavia], " 'ethnic cleansing' has been carried out by means of murder, torture, arbitrary arrest and detention, extrajudicial executions, rape and sexual assaults, confinement of the civilian population in ghetto areas, forcible removal, displacement and deportation of the civilian population, deliberate military attacks or threats of attacks on civilians and civilian areas, and wanton destruction of property. Those practices constitute crimes against humanity and can be assimilated to specific war crimes. Furthermore, such acts could also fall within the meaning of the Genocide Convention.

The official United Nations definition of ethnic cleansing is "rendering an area ethnically homogeneous by using force or intimidation to remove from a given area persons of another ethnic or religious group." As a category, ethnic cleansing encompasses a continuum or spectrum of policies. In the words of Andrew Bell-Fialkoff, "ethnic cleansing ... defies easy definition. At one end it is virtually indistinguishable from forced emigration and population exchange, while at the other it merges with deportation and genocide. At the most general level, however, ethnic cleansing can be understood as the expulsion of a population from a given territory."

Terry Martin has defined ethnic cleansing as "the forcible removal of an ethnically defined population from a given territory" and as "occupying the central part of a continuum between genocide on one end and nonviolent pressured ethnic emigration on the other end."

Gregory Stanton, the founder of Genocide Watch, has criticised the rise of the term and its use for events that he feels should be called "genocide": because "ethnic cleansing" has no legal definition, its media use can detract attention from events that should be prosecuted as genocide. Ethnic cleansing has also been used as a euphemism for 'ethnocide' or 'cultural genocide'.

=== As a crime under international law ===
There is no international treaty that specifies a specific crime of ethnic cleansing; however, ethnic cleansing in the broad sense—the forcible deportation of a population—is defined as a crime against humanity under the statutes of both the International Criminal Court (ICC) and the International Criminal Tribunal for the Former Yugoslavia (ICTY). The gross human rights violations integral to stricter definitions of ethnic cleansing are treated as separate crimes falling under public international law of crimes against humanity and, in certain circumstances, genocide. There are also situations, such as the expulsion of Germans after World War II, where ethnic cleansing has taken place without legal redress (see Preussische Treuhand v. Poland). Professor of law, Timothy W. Waters, argues that similar ethnic cleansing might go unpunished in the future.

=== Mutual ethnic cleansing ===
Mutual ethnic cleansing occurs when two groups commit ethnic cleansing, within their territories, against members of the other group. For instance, in the 1920s, Turkey expelled its Greek minority, and Greece expelled its Turkish minority following the Greco-Turkish War. Other examples where mutual ethnic cleansing occurred include the First Nagorno-Karabakh War and the population transfers by the Soviets of Germans, Poles, and Ukrainians after World War II.

== Causes ==
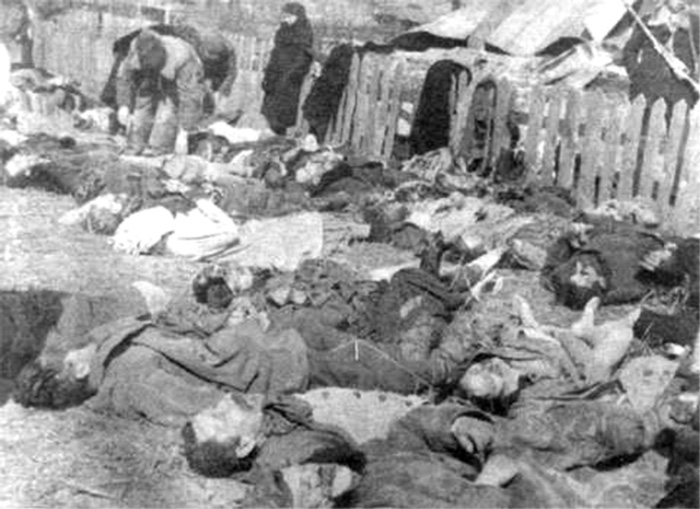
Massacres of Poles in Volhynia in 1943, carried out by Ukrainian nationalists. Most Poles of Volhynia had either been murdered or had fled the area.

According to Michael Mann, in The Dark Side of Democracy (2004), murderous ethnic cleansing correlates with the creation of democracies. He argues that the democratic ideal "rule by the people" tends to be conflated with the rule of one specific people. Yet it is not democratic states that are most prone to commit ethnic cleansing, because minorities tend to have constitutional guarantees. Neither are stable authoritarian regimes (except the Nazi and communist regimes), which are likely perpetrators of murderous ethnic cleansing, but those regimes that are in the process of democratization. Ethnic hostility appears where ethnic identity eclipses conventional social classes as the underlying cause of social stratification. Usually, in deeply divided societies, categories such as class and ethnicity are deeply intertwined, and when an ethnic group is seen as an oppressor or exploitative of the other, serious ethnic conflict can develop. Michael Mann holds that when two ethnic groups claim sovereignty over the same territory and can feel threatened, their differences can lead to severe grievances and danger of ethnic cleansing. The perpetration of murderous ethnic cleansing tends to occur in unstable geopolitical environments and in contexts of war. As ethnic cleansing requires high levels of organisation and is usually directed by states or other authoritative powers, perpetrators are usually state powers or institutions with some coherence and capacity, not failed states as it is generally perceived. The perpetrator's powers tend to get support by core constituencies that favour combinations of nationalism, statism, and violence.

Ethnic cleansing was prevalent during the Age of Nationalism in Europe (19th and 20th centuries). Multi-ethnic Europeans engaged in ethnic cleansing against minorities in order to preempt their secession and the loss of territory. Ethnic cleansing was particularly prevalent during periods of interstate war.

== Genocide ==
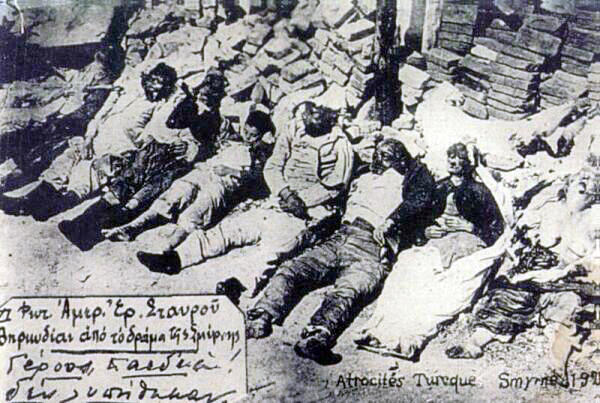
Photo taken after the burning of Smyrna. From 1914 until 1923, Ottoman Greeks in Thrace and Asia Minor were subject to a campaign including massacres and deportations. The International Association of Genocide Scholars (IAGS) recognizes it as genocide and refers to the campaign as the Greek Genocide.

Ethnic cleansing has been described as part of a continuum of violence whose most extreme form is genocide. Ethnic cleansing is similar to forced deportation or population transfer. While ethnic cleansing and genocide may share the same goal and methods (e.g., forced displacement), ethnic cleansing is intended to displace a persecuted population from a given territory, while genocide is intended to destroy a group.

Some academics consider genocide to be a subset of "murderous ethnic cleansing." Norman Naimark writes that these concepts are different but related, for "literally and figuratively, ethnic cleansing bleeds into genocide, as mass murder is committed in order to rid the land of a people." William Schabas states, "Ethnic cleansing is also a warning sign of genocide to come. Genocide is the last resort of the frustrated ethnic cleanser." Multiple genocide scholars have criticized distinguishing between ethnic cleansing and genocide, with Martin Shaw arguing that forced deportation necessarily results in the destruction of a group, and this must be foreseen by the perpetrators. (Note: "How could ‘forced deportation’ ever be achieved without extreme coercion, indeed violence? How, indeed, could deportation not be forced? How could people not resist? How could it not involve the destruction of a community, of the way of life that a group has enjoyed over a period of time? How could those who deported a group not intend this destruction? In what significant way is the forcible removal of a population from their homeland different from the destruction’ of a group? If the boundary between ‘cleansing’ and genocide is unreal, why police it?") Furthermore, ethnic cleansing has been identified as a euphemism for genocide or cultural genocide.

== As a military, political, and economic tactic ==
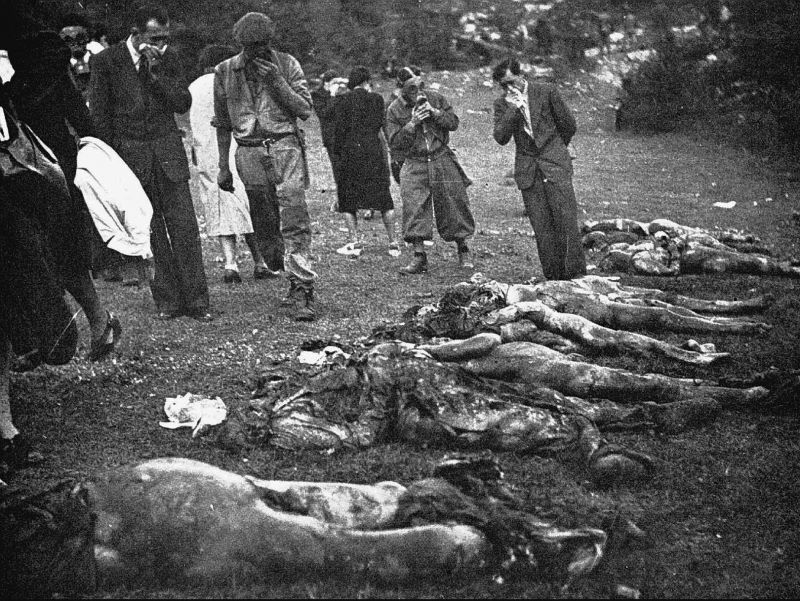
Italian foibe massacres victims

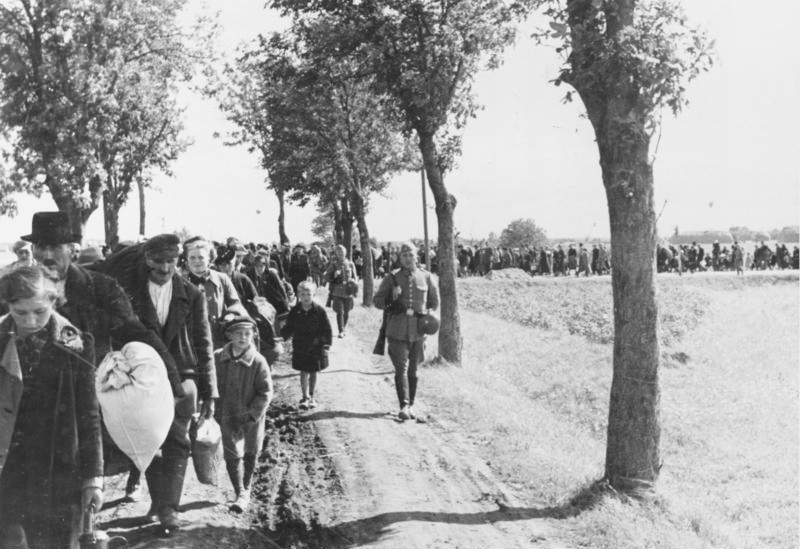
Expulsion of Poles by Nazi Germany. Poles are led to trains under German army escort, as part of the ethnic cleansing of western Poland annexed to the German Reich following the invasion.

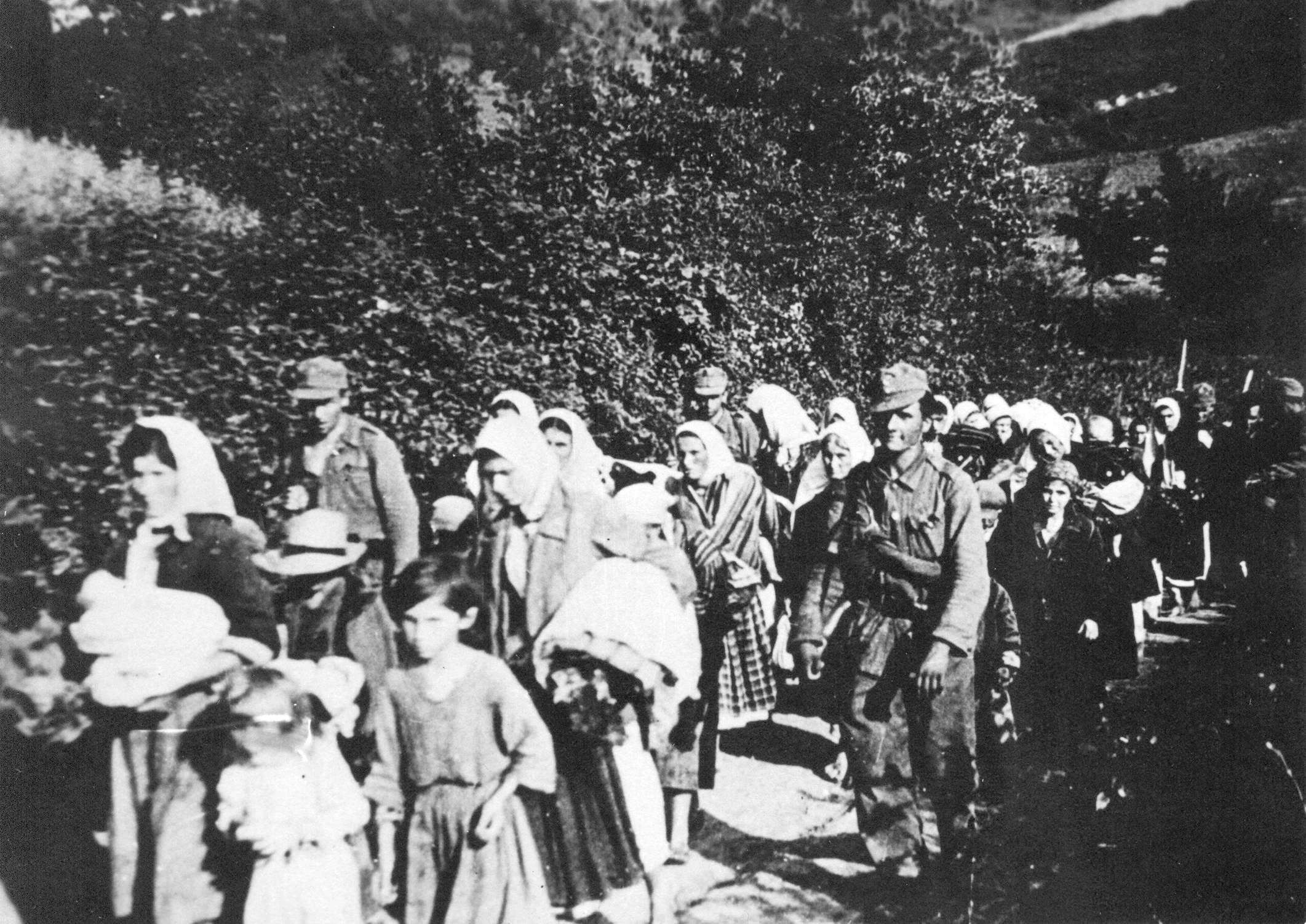
A group of Serbians from Kozara, Bosanska Dubica, Bosnia and Herzegovina that were forced out of their homes and villages by genocidal Axis Ustaše Croatian forces as part of ethnic cleansing in 1942 Kozara Massacre

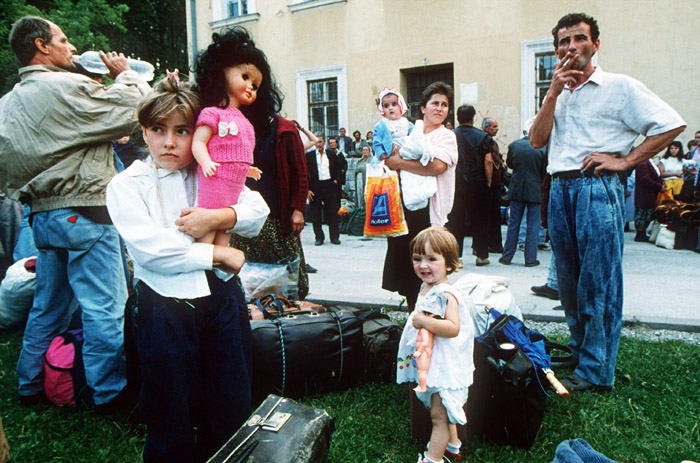
A group of Bosniaks from the Lašva Valley close by Travnik, Bosnia and Herzegovina that were forced out of their homes and villages by Croat forces in 1993

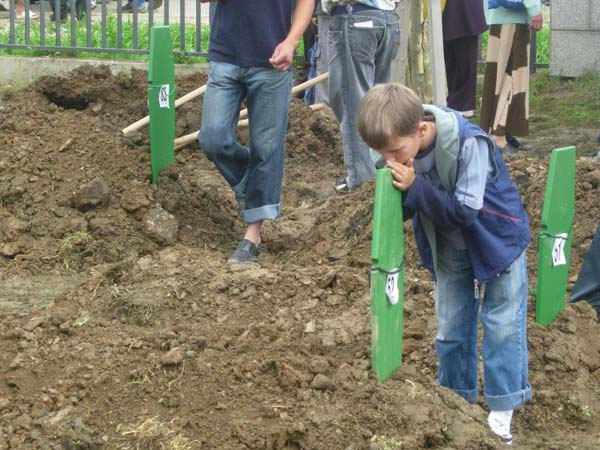
The funeral of Bosniak victims of the Srebrenica massacre, carried out by Serbian forces as part of ethnic cleansing in the Bosnian War

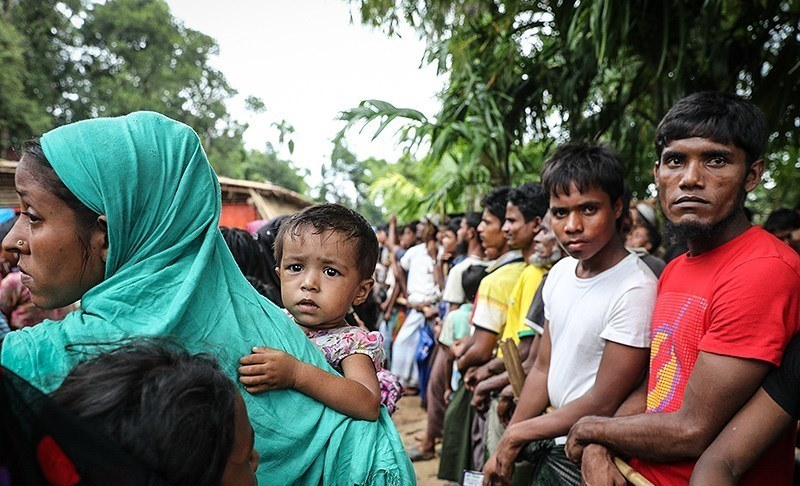
Rohingya Muslim refugees from Myanmar in October 2017

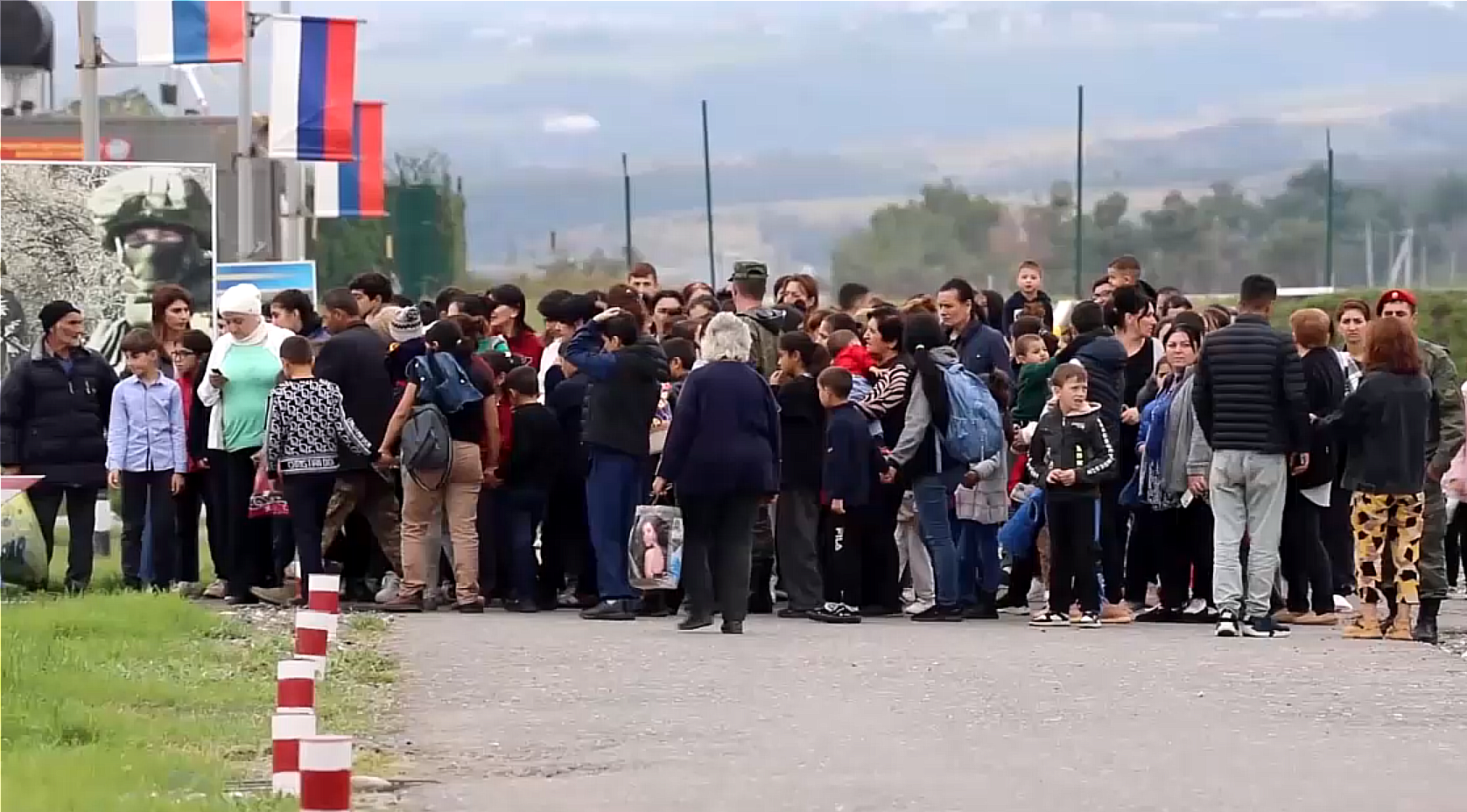
Expulsion of Nagorno-Karabakh Armenians in September 2023

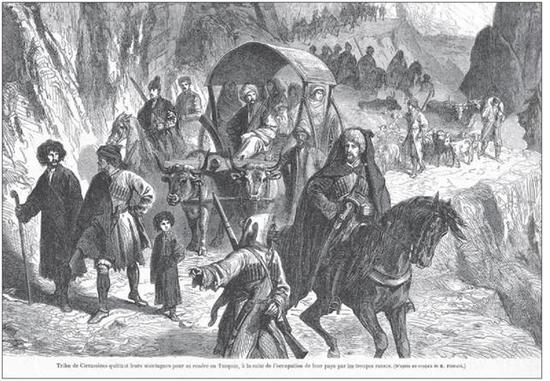
Portrait of Circassian refugees evicting their towns and villages after the Russian invasion of Circassia. According to some authors, Russian military forces massacred and forcibly deported between 95 and 97% of all native Circassians during the Circassian genocide. Russian Count Nikolay Yevdokimov, who organized the extermination campaigns of "Tsitsekun", designated Russian military operations targeting Circassian natives by the term "ochishchenie" (cleansing).

The foibe massacres (Italian: massacri delle foibe; Slovene: poboji v fojbah; Croatian: masakri fojbe), or simply "the foibe," refers to ethnic cleansing, mass killings, and deportations both during and immediately after World War II, mainly committed by Yugoslav Partisans and OZNA in the then-Italian territories (Note: Successively lost by Italy to Yugoslavia after the Treaty of Peace (1947).) of Julian March (Karst Region and Istria), Kvarner, and Dalmatia, against local Italians (Istrian Italians and Dalmatian Italians) and Slavs, primarily members of fascist and collaborationist forces and civilians opposed to the new Yugoslav authorities, and Italian, German, Croat, and Slovene anti-communists against the regime of Josip Broz Tito, presumed to be associated with fascism, Nazism, collaboration with Axis and the recent purge of real, potential, or presumed opponents of Titoism The Foibe massacres were followed by the Istrian–Dalmatian exodus, which was the post-World War II exodus and departure of between 230,000 and 350,000 local ethnic Italians (Istrian Italians and Dalmatian Italians) towards Italy, and, in smaller numbers, towards the Americas, Australia, and South Africa. From 1947, after the war, they were subject by Yugoslav authorities to less violent forms of intimidation, such as nationalization, expropriation, and discriminatory taxation, which gave them little option other than emigration. In 1953, there were 36,000 declared Italians in Yugoslavia, just about 16% of the original Italian population before World War II. According to the census organized in Croatia in 2001 and that organized in Slovenia in 2002, the Italians who remained in the former Yugoslavia amounted to 21,894 people (2,258 in Slovenia and 19,636 in Croatia).

The resettlement policy of the Neo-Assyrian Empire in the 9th and 7th centuries BC is considered by some scholars to be one of the first cases of ethnic cleansing.

During the 1980s, in Lebanon, ethnic cleansing was common during all phases of the conflict. Notable incidents were seen in the early phase of the war, such as the Damour massacre, the Karantina massacre, and the Siege of the Tel al-Zaatar Palestinian refugee camp, and during the 1982 Lebanon War, such as the Sabra and Shatila Massacre committed by Lebanese Maronite forces backed by Israel against Palestinian refugees and Lebanese Shia civilians. After the Israeli withdrawal from the Chouf, the Mountain War broke out, where ethnic cleansings (mostly in the form of tit-for-tat killings) occurred. During that time, the Syrian-backed, mostly Druze-dominated People's Liberation Army used a policy they called "territorial cleansing" to "drain" the Chouf of Maronite Christians in order to deny them the ability to resist the advance of the PSP. As a result, 163,670 Christian villagers were displaced. In response to these massacres, the Lebanese Forces conducted a similar policy, which resulted in 20,000 Druze displaced.

Ethnic cleansing was a common phenomenon in the wars in Croatia, Kosovo, and Bosnia and Herzegovina. This entailed intimidation, forced expulsion, or killing of the unwanted ethnic group as well as the destruction of its places of worship, cemeteries, and cultural and historical buildings. The goal is to alter the population composition of an area in favor of another ethnic group, which becomes the new majority.

According to numerous ICTY verdicts and indictments, Serb and Croat forces performed ethnic cleansing of their territories planned by their political leadership to create ethnically pure states (Republika Srpska and Republic of Serbian Krajina by the Serbs; and Herzeg-Bosnia by the Croats).

Survivors of the ethnic cleansing were left severely traumatized as a consequence of this campaign.

Israeli herders have engaged in a systemic displacement of Palestinian herders in Area C of the West Bank as a form of nationalist and economic warfare.

According to historian Norman Naimark, during an ethnic cleansing process, there may be destruction of physical symbols of the victims, including temples, books, monuments, graveyards, and street names: "Ethnic cleansing involves not only the forced deportation of entire nations but also the eradication of the memory of their presence."

== See also ==
- Demographic engineering
- Discrimination based on skin tone
- Ethnic conflict
- Ethnic violence
- Ethnocentrism
- Genocide studies
- Identity cleansing
- Identity politics
- Nativism (politics)
- Political cleansing of population
- Population cleansing
- Racial segregation
- Racism
- Redlining
- Religious discrimination
- Religious persecution
- Religious segregation
- Religious violence
- Sectarian violence
- Social cleansing
- Supremacism
- Xenophobia
