= Horizontalidad =

Anti-globalization social movement

Horizontalidad (Spanish: [oɾisontaliˈðað], horizontality or horizontalism) is a social relationship that advocates the creation, development, and maintenance of social structures for the equitable distribution of management power and is a prominent concept within anarchist thought. These structures and relationships function as a result of dynamic self-management, involving the continuity of participation and exchange between individuals to achieve the larger desired outcomes of the collective whole.

== Origin ==
As a specific term, horizontalidad is attributed to the radical movements that sprouted in December 2001, in Argentina, after the economic crisis. According to Marina Sitrin, it is a new social creation. Different from many social movements of the past, it rejected political programs, opting instead to create directly democratic spaces and new social relationship.

The related term "horizontals" arose during the anti-globalisation European Social Forum in London in 2004 to describe people organising in a style where they "aspire to an open relationship between participants, whose deliberative encounters (rather than representative status) form the basis of any decisions," in contrast to "verticals" who "assume the existence and legitimacy of representative structures, in which bargaining power is accrued on the basis of an electoral mandate (or any other means of selection to which the members of an organisation assent)".

According to Paul Mason, "the power of the horizontalist movements is, first, their replicability by people who know nothing about theory, and secondly, their success in breaking down the hierarchies that seek to contain them. They are exposed to a montage of ideas, in a way that the structured, difficult-to-conquer knowledge of the 1970s and 1980s did not allow (...) The big question for horizontalist movements is that as long as you don't articulate against power, you're basically doing what somebody has called "reform by riot": a guy in a hoodie goes to jail for a year so that a guy in a suit can get his law through parliament".

== Practice ==
Neka, a participant in the unemployed workers movement of Solano, outside Buenos Aires, Argentina, described horizontalidad as:

"First we began learning something together, it was a sort of waking up to a knowledge that was collective, and this has to do with a collective self-awareness of what was taking place within all of us. First we began by asking one another, and ourselves questions, and from there we began to resolve things together. Each day we continue discovering and constructing while walking. It is like each day is a horizon that opens before us, and this horizon does not have any recipe or program, we begin here, without what was in the past. What we had was life, our life each day, our difficulties, problems, crisis, and what we had in our hands at the time was what we used to go looking for solutions. The beginning of the practice of horizontalidad can be seen in this process. It is the walk, the process of questioning as we walk that enriched our growth, and helped us discover that strength is different when we are side by side, when there is no one to tell you what you have to do, but rather when we decide who we are. I do not believe there is a definition for what we are doing, we know how it is done, but we are not going to come across any definition, in this way it is similar to horizontalidad. More than an answer to a practice, it is an everyday practice.

My personal perspective has to do with the idea of freedom, this idea of discovering that we have collective knowledge that brings us together, that give us strength, that bring us to processes of discovery. This is beyond revolutionary theories, theories that we all know and have heard so often, theories that are often converted into tools of oppression and submission. The practice of horizontalidad can give the possibility of breaking with this and creating something that gives us the security that we can self-organize, and do it well, and do so far away from those that try and tell us politics must be done in a particular way.

Constructing freedom is a learning process that can only happen in practice. For me, horizontalidad, autonomy, freedom, creativity, and happiness are all concepts that go together and are all things that both have to be practiced and learned in the practice. I think back to previous activist experiences I had and remember a powerful feeling of submission. This includes even my own conduct, which was often really rigid, and it was difficult for me to enjoy myself, which is something sane and that strengthens you, and if you do it collectively it is that much more so. Like under capitalism, we were giving up the possibility of enjoying ourselves and being happy. We need to constantly break with this idea, we have life and the life that we have is to live today, and not to wait to take any power so that we can begin to enjoy ourselves, I believe it is an organic process." (Quoted in Horizontalism, Sitrin, 2006)

== See also ==
- Anarchism
- Autogestion
- Clandestine Insurgent Rebel Clown Army
- Corporative federalism
- Consociationalism
- Economic democracy
- General assembly (Occupy movement)
- Kritarchy
- Libertarian Municipalism
- Meritocracy
- Multicameralism
- Panarchism
- Participatory Economics
- Pillarisation
- Polycentric law
- Popular assembly
- Responsible autonomy
- Social Ecology
- Socialism
- Symbolic interactionism
