= Michele Simon =

Public health lawyer (born 1965)

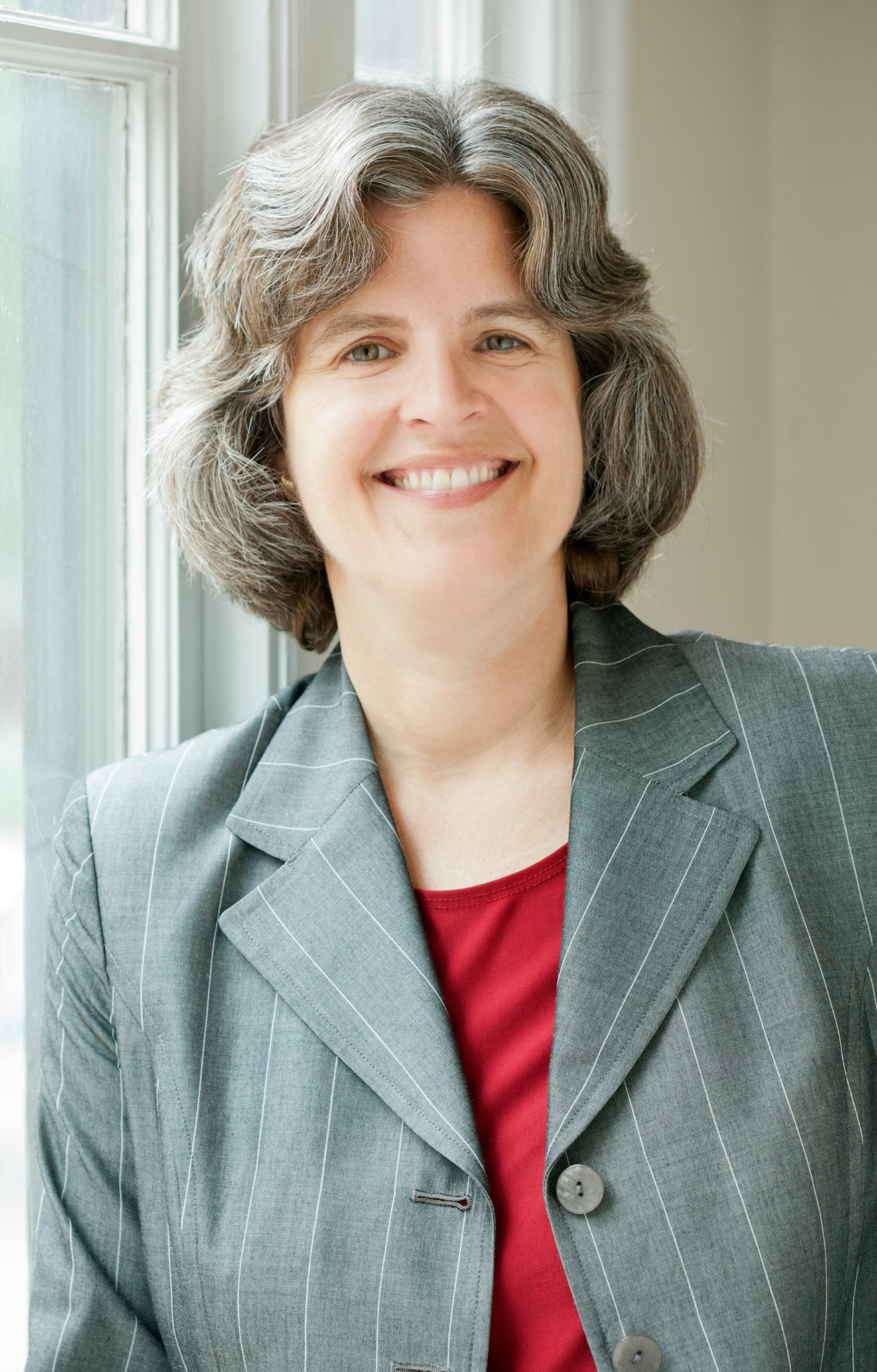
- Born: 1965 (age 60–61)
- Education: Carnegie Mellon University
- Alma mater: Yale University
- Occupation: Public health lawyer
- Partner: Ross Turner
- Writing career
- Subject: Food policy
- Notable works: Appetite for Profit: How the Food Industry Undermines Our Health and How to Fight Back
- Notable awards: National Association of Nutrition Professional's Community Award

Michele Simon (born 1965) is a public health lawyer who has been researching and writing about food policy since 1996. She has written extensively on the politics of food. Her book, Appetite for Profit: How the Food Industry Undermines Our Health and How to Fight Back, was published by Nation Books in 2006. Simon has also written extensively about alcohol policy.

== Biography ==
Simon studied biology at Carnegie Mellon University and received her master's degree in public health from Yale University and her Juris Doctor degree from the University of California, Hastings College of the Law. Early in her career, Simon wrote about the politics of food for numerous publications, on such issues as genetically engineered foods, organic standards, and the National School Lunch Program.

In 2000, Simon founded the non-profit organization, Center for Informed Food Choices to educate people about eating plant-based foods and the politics of food through her newsletter, Informed Eating.

From 2007 to 2011, Simon served as research and policy director for the Marin Institute (now called Alcohol Justice), an alcohol industry watchdog group based in Northern California. Simon testified before Congress in support of HR 5034, the Comprehensive Alcohol Regulatory Enforcement Act. Her 2007 report on alcoholic energy drinks led to federal action to ban the products.

Simon founded Eat Drink Politics in 2011, a food and alcohol industry watchdog consulting firm that helps advocates, policymakers, and others counter corporate tactics that undermine public health. Simon served as a senior advisor for the Campaign for a Commercial-Free Childhood (now called Fairplay.

In 2013, Simon was awarded the National Association of Nutrition Professional's Community Award and the Nutritional Therapy Association's Award of Excellence.

In 2016, Simon founded the Plant Based Foods Association (PBFA), a trade association representing the plant-based foods industry. Simon served as PBFA's executive director through 2020, advancing policies and practices to promote plant-based foods.

In 2023, Simon wrote a chapter for the book The Good it Promises, The Harm it Does: Critical Essays on Effective Altruism. The book was edited by Alice Crary, Lori Gruen, and Carol J. Adams and published by the Oxford University Press. The Harm it Does was critical of the effective altruism movement, with Simon's chapter (How "Alernative Proteins" Create a Private Solution to a Public Problem) arguing that alternative proteins, such as cultured meat or meat substitutes, are an ineffective means to end animal suffering.

== Work ==
=== Writing ===
Simon's book, Appetite for Profit: How the Food Industry Undermines Our Health and How to Fight Back, was published by Nation Books in 2006.

Simon has contributed to various outlets such as The Huffington Post, Grist, and Food Safety News.

Simon has authored numerous articles in academic journals, including the City University of New York Law Review, Food and Drug Law Journal, Duke Law Journal, and the Loyola of Los Angeles Law Review.

Simon has published reports exposing the food and alcohol industries' negative practices. Her 2007 report on alcoholic energy drinks helped lead to a federal ban on the products. Simon's "Food Stamps, Follow the Money" brought attention to industry lobbying in the food stamps program in the United States. "And Now a Word from Our Sponsors", covered by The New York Times, highlighted corporate sponsorships in the Academy of Nutrition and Dietetics.

=== Speaking ===
Simon has lectured at New York University, Yale University, Stanford University, and Massachusetts Institute of Technology. She taught semester-long courses in health policy as an adjunct professor at the University of California, Hastings College of the Law, alcohol policy at the University of California, Berkeley, and The Politics of Food at the University of the Pacific master's program in Food Studies.

Simon has spoken at numerous events to discuss the plant-based foods industry, including the Natural Products Expo, the Seed, Food and Wine Festival, and the Animal Law Conference.

== Personal life ==
Simon was raised in New York City and lives in Los Angeles, California, with her partner, film and television actor Ross Turner.
