= Corporative federalism =

Federalism based on members' legal personhood

Corporative federalism is a system of federalism not based on the common federalist idea of relative land area or nearest spheres of influence for governance, but on fiduciary jurisdiction to corporate personhood in which groups that are considered incorporated members of their own prerogative structure by willed agreement can delegate their individual effective legislature within the overall government.

The Austro-Hungarian Empire had a version of corporative federalism and gave its number of different ethnicities their own individual rights within their own assemblies instead of by relation to the territory of the empire.

Part of corporative federalism's philosophical underpinnings as a form of jurisdiction rests within the auspices of demographics as polities as much as they are constituencies of a federative structure. Theories adding philosophic backing to its own conceptualizations from such ideas as diplomatic recognition and the sovereign state's right to exist as if it extended beyond territorial nation-state in an international structure, to an intranational structure of the voluntary association of those with similar social world views being codified legal frameworks to themselves, within their own sphere of interaction, under a federal government of a particular nation state and relying on infrastructural power for implementation.

== See also ==
- Consociational state
- Extraterritoriality
- Horizontalism
- Multicameralism
- National personal autonomy
- Pillarisation – also known as 'vertical federalism'
- Polycentric law
- Prerogative
- Regulatory agency
- Sui iuris
- Symbolic interactionism
- Voluntary association
