= CUNY School of Law =

Public law school in New York City, New York

Coordinates: 40.74770°N 73.94369°W

City University of New York School of Law
- Motto: Law in the Service of Human Needs
- Established: 1983
- School type: Public law school
- Dean: Sudha Setty
- Location: Long Island City, New York City, New York, United States
- USNWR ranking: 154 (2024)
- Bar pass rate: 74.56% (2022 first-time takers)
- Website: www.law.cuny.edu

The City University of New York School of Law (CUNY School of Law, pronounced /ˈkjuːni/, KYOO-nee) is a public law school in New York City. It was founded in 1983 as part of the City University of New York and is the only publicly funded law school in the city. CUNY Law's dual mission is "to recruit and train outstanding public interest lawyers" and to "diversify the legal profession."

CUNY Law's curriculum is centered around integrating clinical teaching methods within traditional legal studies. The curriculum is unique among law schools in its emphasis on civil rights law, indigent defense, and using the law to challenge systemic inequalities.

For the class of 2022, 63.83% obtained full-time, long-term, JD-required employment within nine months after graduation including 48.12% employed in public-interest law.

== Campus ==
In 2012, CUNY Law moved from Flushing, Queens to 2 Court Square in Long Island City, giving the school nearly 70,000 additional square feet of space. This location is within walking distance of the subway, buses, and Long Island Rail Road. It is only a few blocks away from the Long Island City Courthouse. The move enabled CUNY School of Law to develop a new part-time program, which started in 2015.

The building at 2 Court Square is LEED Gold certified, which means that its construction had a reduced environmental impact and its design increases occupants' health and well-being. A ground floor gallery spans the length of the building's main curved façade, terminating in a multi-story atrium space. Adjacent to a communicating stair, the atrium space allows for visual and physical connection amongst the departments and floors of the Law school and promotes interaction at multiple levels.

== History ==
In 1981, CUNY hired Charles Halpern to be the founding dean of a planned law school. Halpern is regarded within the legal community as the "father of public interest law" with a professional career as a Georgetown law professor and co-founder of the Center for Law and Social Policy, an organization based in Washington D.C. that advocates for policies that aim to improve the lives of low-income people.

In Spring 1982, Dean Halpern hired Howard Lesnick as a Distinguished Professor of Law. Professor Lesnick believed that CUNY law students needed to understand that the law only has significance in relation to the underlying human problems that it addresses.

Lawyer and human rights advocate W. Haywood Burns became the second dean of CUNY Law in 1987, making him the first African American dean of a New York law school. He led CUNY School of Law in gaining its accreditation, ensuring the survival of its progressive commitment to public interest law.

== Academics ==
=== Admissions ===
For the entering 2025 class, CUNY Law accepted 28.65% of applicants. Full-time admitted students averaged a 155 LSAT score and 3.54 undergraduate GPA. Part-time students averaged a 153 LSAT score and 3.27 undergraduate GPA. For the class enrolling in 2023, CUNY Law accepted 39.9% of students, the average enrollee having a 153 LSAT score and a 3.51 undergraduate GPA. For the class entering in 2022, CUNY Law accepted 35.27% of applicants with 32.96% of those accepted enrolling, with the average enrollee having a 154 LSAT score and 3.42 undergraduate GPA.

=== Curriculum and clinical programs ===
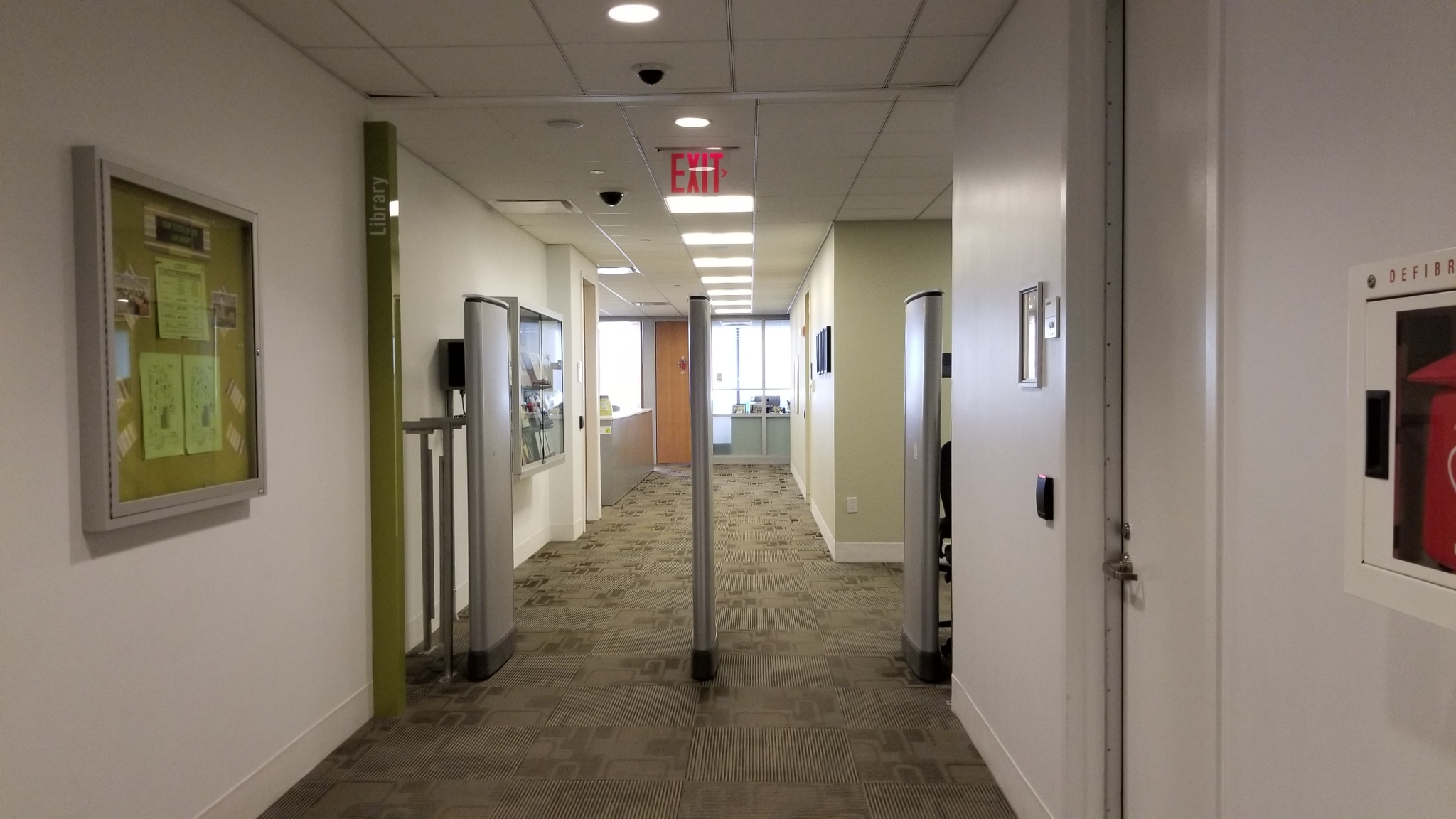
Entrance to CUNY Law's library

CUNY Law is currently ranked #4 nationally for its clinical education program. The Law School curriculum combines traditional substantive law courses (like contracts, torts, civil procedure and criminal law) with lawyering skills throughout the three years of legal education. The first year curriculum consists of seven required substantive courses, Legal Research, and a four-credit Lawyering Seminar in each semester where students work on legal writing and other lawyering skills through simulations and other role-playing devices. Critical race theory is a required 1L course, which was added to "provide a shared, foundational framework for students to address how the ideology of white supremacy informs the substance of U.S. law and identify effective responses" following the murder of George Floyd. CUNY Law divides its constitutional law component into two classes. The first class, Liberty, Equality, and Due Process, is taught in the first semester of 1L and examines the standards of equal protection and due process. The second class, Constitutional Structures, is a 2L class which examines federalism and the distribution of powers among local, state, and federal governments. Each third-year student is required to participate in a clinic or concentration for one or two semesters (12 to 16 credits).

Under the umbrella of Main Street Legal Services, Inc., several clinics provide direct service, in-house, supervised live-client representation. The two concentrations are supervised external placements.

Clinics at the school include:

- Community & Economic Development Clinic
- Creating Law Enforcement Accountability & Responsibility (CLEAR)
- Defenders Clinic
- Disability Rights and Social Justice Clinic
- Equality & Justice Practice Clinic (née Concentration)
- Family Law Practice Clinic (née Concentration)
- Family Defense Clinic
- Immigrant and Non-Citizen Rights Clinic
- Human Rights & Gender Justice Clinic
- Mediation Clinic

=== Justice initiatives and special programs ===
In addition to numerous pro bono opportunities available through student organizations and the Career Planning Office, the Law School supports a number of justice initiatives that serve citizen and non-citizen workers and assist and empower historically underserved communities. These include the Community Legal Resource Network (CLRN), the Center on Latinx Rights and Equality (CLRE), the Center for Urban Environmental Reform (CUER), and the Economic Justice Project (EJP). The Contemplative Lawyering Program offers yoga and meditation.

- Community Legal Resource Network (CLRN): Begun in 1998, CLRN is the Law School's initiative for alumni's continued work on to promote justice. There are 3 primary initiatives: 1) Launchpad for Justice Fellowship, supporting recent graduates in developing their skills and job readiness though collaborations with Court-based and community-based legal programs in underserved communities. 2) City Counseling Program where experienced alumni provide free legal consultations via legislative offices to constituents on issues such as housing, immigration, and small business needs. 3) CUNY LawWorks, a low-cost, co-working space for alumni as they set up solo or small-group practices or non-profit organizations devoted to serving pressing needs of the poor and disadvantaged in communities.
- Center on Latinx Rights and Equality (CLRE)] Focuses on issues impacting the Latino community in the United States, with the goal of developing progressive strategies for legal reform. The Center educates lawyers, law students, scholars and the general public and advocates for expanded civil rights in the areas that affect the growing Latinx population.
- Center for Urban Environmental Reform (CUER): Founded on the belief that environmental justice is a critical aspect of social justice and that communities are entitled to participate fully and meaningfully in environmental decisions that affect them.
- Economic Justice Project (EJP): Launched in 1997 in response to regressive welfare policies adopted by the City of New York. CUNY law students advocate for policy change at the state and local level along with the Welfare Rights Initiative and other community organizations.

The Haywood Burns Chair in Civil Rights brings prominent visiting civil rights figures to the Law School in memory of its second dean, a national civil rights scholar and activist. Prior Burns Chair recipients include James Foreman Jr., Eric K. Yamamoto, and the Hon. Robert L. Carter.

=== Bar passage ===
In 2022, 74.56% of CUNY Law first time takers passed a bar examination. The ultimate bar passage rate for 2020 CUNY Law graduates was 84.51% and five graduates did not take a bar examination within two years of graduation.

=== Rankings and reputation ===
CUNY Law is recognized as a top school for racial justice with an A+ ranking from National Jurist/PreLaw Magazine. who also awarded the Law School the #1 ranking for Most Diverse Law School in 2024. The Princeton Review’s "Best Law Schools for 2024" rankings further acknowledged CUNY Law, with the school securing the #1 spot for "Most Diverse Faculty" nationwide and placing in four out of fourteen top categories (#2 Most Chosen by Older Students; #2 Most Liberal Students; #8 Greatest Resources for Women).

U.S. News & World Report ranked CUNY #1 among "Law Schools with the Most Public Interest Graduates," #154 in American Bar Association approved law schools for 2024, and #34 in part-time law programs.

== Publications ==
City University of New York Law Review is a student-run publication devoted to producing public interest scholarship, engaging with the public interest bar, and fostering student excellence in writing, legal analysis, and research. It is published twice-yearly. Issues have included a symposium issue on Justice Ruth Bader Ginsburg, a special issue devoted to student scholarship, a special volume on Elder Law featuring award articles that received awards from the ABA Law and Aging Student Competition, and a forthcoming symposium issue on the work of Ruthann Robson.

== Student life ==
CUNY Law's student body is diverse, and in addition, 42% of the incoming students are first-generation college students, with 42% identifying as LGBTQ+. The school has ranked as the nation's most diverse law school in preLaw Magazine’s annual survey for the three years in a row as of 2025.

Undergraduate demographics as of Fall 2026
Race and ethnicity	Total
White	29%
Hispanic	24%
Black	16%
Asian	12%
Other (Note: Other consists of multiracial Americans & those who prefer to not say.)	8%
Economic diversity
Low-income (Note: The percentage of students who received an income-based federal Pell Grant intended for low-income students.)	37%
Affluent (Note: The percentage of students who are a part of the American middle class at the bare minimum.)	63%

CUNY School of Law in 2008 established the Center for Diversity in the Legal Profession which conducts original research and serves as a clearinghouse for data on the participation of people of color in the law.

Other initiatives include the Gender Persecution Observatory, which consolidates data and research on gender-based violence into an interactive worldwide forum, and the Second Look Project, where Defenders Clinic students assist individuals with clemency applications.

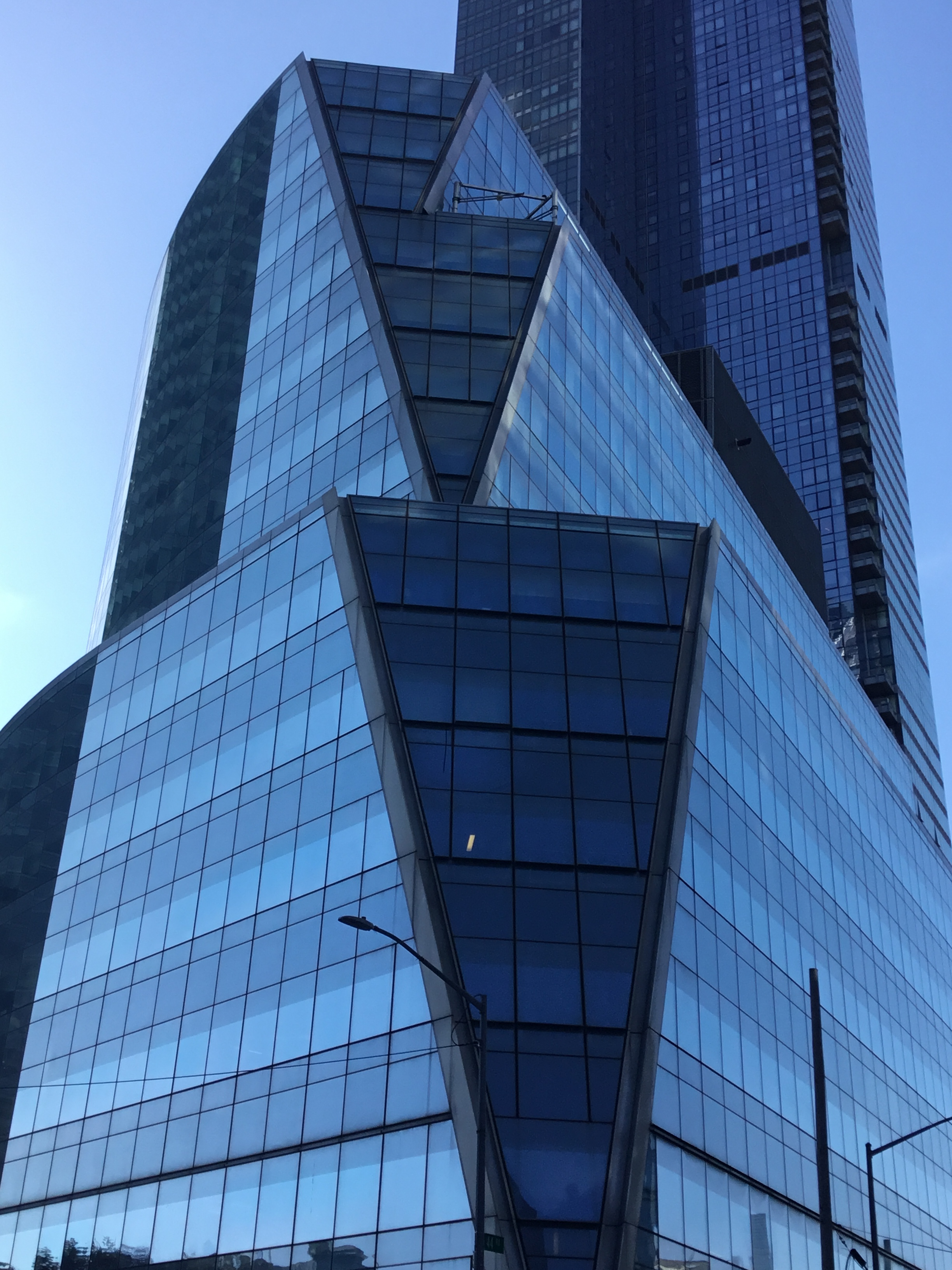
CUNY School of Law in Long Island City, Queens

== Employment ==
According to CUNY School of Law's official 2023 ABA-required disclosures, 63.83% of the Class of 2022 obtained full-time, long-term, JD-required employment nine months after graduation including 48.12% in public interest law and 22.5% in government. CUNY School of Law's Law School Transparency under-employment score is 16.5% indicating the percentage of the Class of 2022 unemployed or working in a non-professional, short-term, or part-time job nine months after graduation, while those graduates who responded in 2017 reported a mean salary of $62,360 and median salary of $59,438.

ABA Employment Summary for 2022 Graduates
Employment Status	Percentage
Employed - Bar Passage Required	63.83%
Employed - J.D. Advantage	10.11%
Employed - Professional Position	7.98%
Employed - Non-Professional Position	0.005%
Employed - Law School/University Funded	2.13%
Employed - Undeterminable	0.0%
Pursuing Graduate Degree Full Time	0.0%
Unemployed - Start Date Deferred	3.19%
Unemployed - Not Seeking	0.0%
Unemployed - Seeking	10.11%
Employment Status Unknown	1.6%
Total of 188 Graduates

== Notable people ==
=== Deans ===
1. Charles Halpern (1981–1987), founding Dean of CUNY Law.
2. W. Haywood Burns (1987–1994)
3. Kristin Booth Glen (1995–2006), stepped down after being elected to the Manhattan Surrogate's Court.
4. Michelle Anderson (2006–2016)
5. Mary Lu Bilek (2016–2021), stepped down following a controversial comment she made during a faculty meeting.
6. Eduardo R.C. Capulong (March 2021–June 2022), interim.
7. Sudha Setty (2022–2025), first person of South Asian descent to lead a CUNY college. Current LSAC President and CEO.
8. Natalie Gomez-Velez (2025–present), interim.

=== Faculty ===
- Harvey Epstein (born 1967), lecturer and Member of the New York City Council
- James Forman Jr., 2024 W. Haywood Burns Chair in Human and Civil Rights, Pulitzer Prize-winning author, J. Skelly Wright Professor of Law at Yale Law School and Faculty Director of the Yale Law and Racial Justice Center.
- Howard Lesnick (1931– 2020), Distinguished Professor of Law (1982–1988).

=== Alumni ===
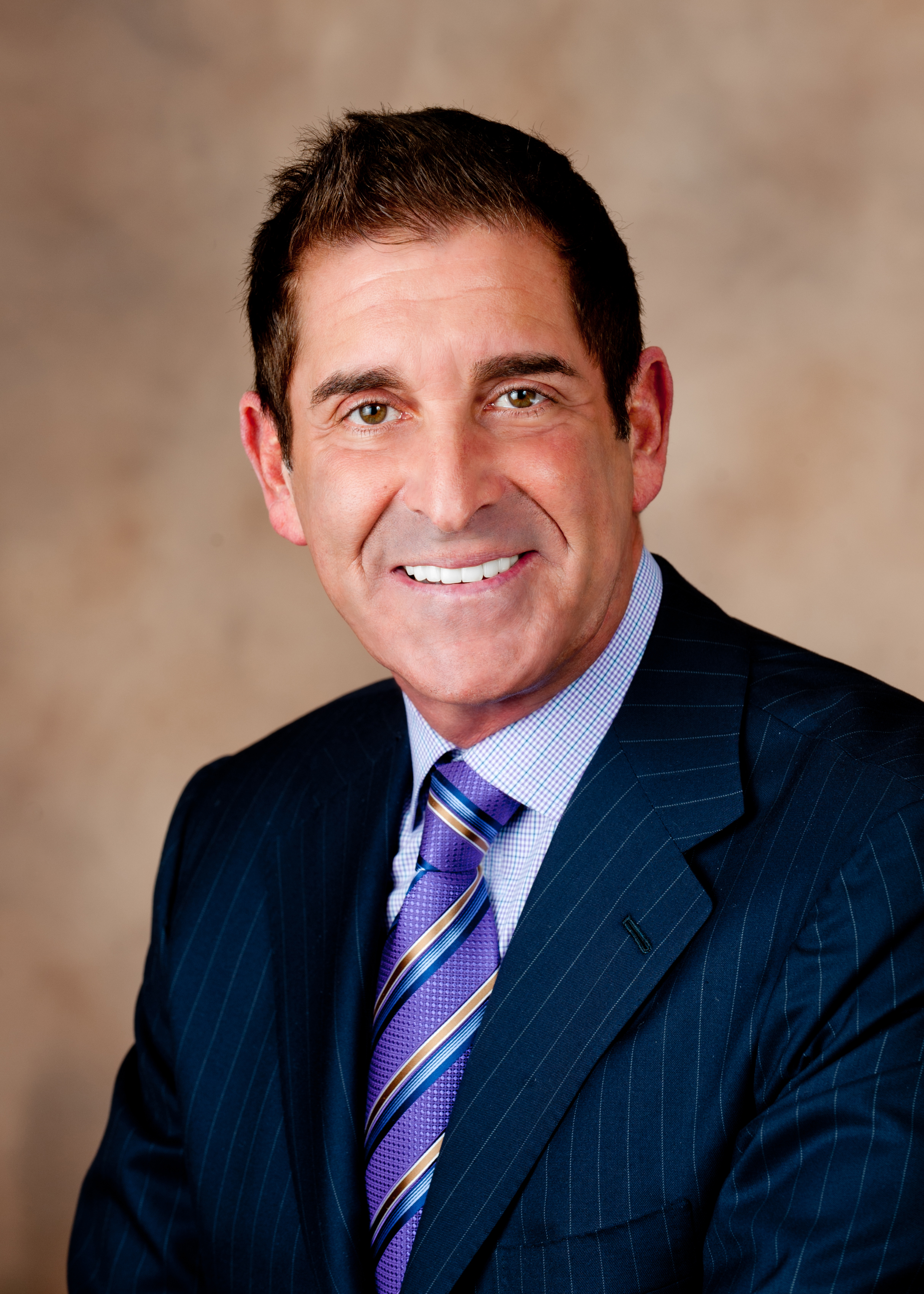
Jeffrey D. Klein

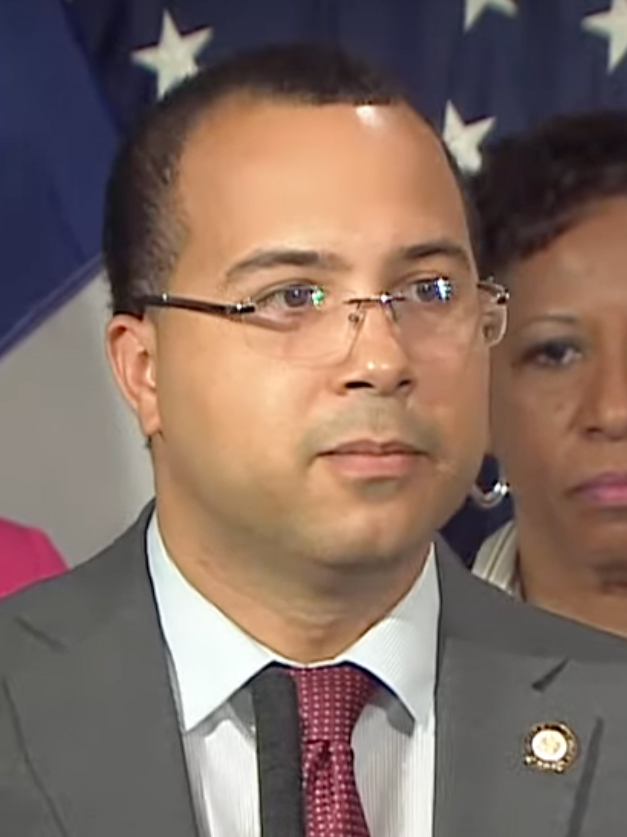
Oswald Feliz

- Jamaal Bailey, politician
- Catalina Cruz, politician
- Brian F. Curran (born 1968), Member of the New York State Assembly, formerly19th Mayor of Lynbrook
- Nerdeen Kiswani, Palestinian-American activist and organizer
- Jeffrey D. Klein, formerly Member of the New York State Senate and Member of the New York State Assembly
- Oswald Feliz (born 1990), Member of the New York City Council
- Eva Golinger, lawyer, activist, author, and journalist
- Martha S. Jones, historian
- Michael Montesano (born 1954), Nassau County District Judge, former Member of the New York State Assembly
- Daniel J. O'Donnell, politician
- Eleanor Raskin, former Weatherman and Administrative Law Judge
- Rebecca Seawright, Member of the New York State Assembly
- Marina Sitrin, author and sociologist
- Iyanla Vanzant, life coach on NBC's Starting Over.
