= Kristin Booth Glen =

New York judge

New York County Surrogate Court Judge
- In office January 1st, 2007 – December 31st, 2012

Personal details
- Party: Democratic
- Education: Stanford University

Kristin Booth Glen is a retired New York judge and legal academic who served as the dean of CUNY School of law for over a decade. Most recently, she served as a judge for New York Surrogacy Court from 2006 to 2012.

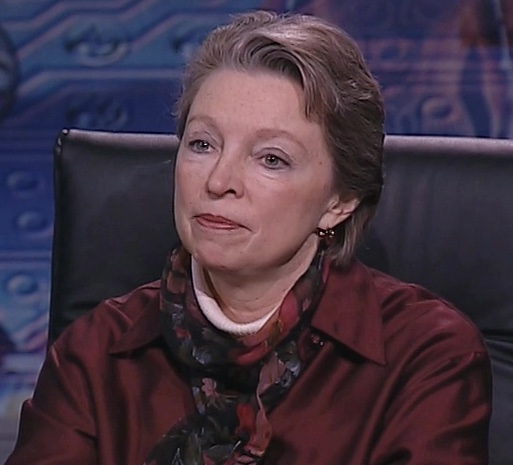
Glen on CUNY TV's Education Forum, 2001

Glen's first judicial position was in 1981, when she was elected to the New York City Civil Court of New York County. She then served as a judge with the New York County Supreme Court (1985-1993) and associate justice of the First Judicial District's Appellate Term (1993-1995) before leaving the bench to become Dean of CUNY School of Law.

Glen is a founder of New York University's Women's Law Clinic. She has served as Commissioner of the Association of American Law Schools' Commission on Pro Bono Opportunities in Legal Education, and has been honored for her contributions to public interest law by the National Lawyers Guild.

== Recognition ==
Hon. Kristin Booth Glen has been recognized with several awards, including Columbia's Public Interest Law Foundation's 1997 Public Interest Achievement Award; the "Outstanding Public Interest Dean of the Year" by the National Association of Public Interest Law in 1998; the Brehon Law Society's 1999 Distinguished Service Award; the Association of Judges of Hispanic Heritage's Frank Torres Commitment to Diversity Award; the New York State Bar Association's Ruth Schapiro Award; and Columbia Law School's Lawrence Wien Award for Social Responsibility. She is also the subject of the 2013 article The Ruling that could Change Everything for Disabled People with Million-Dollar Trusts by Katia Savchuck.
