= Charles Halpern =

American academic

Charles Halpern is a lawyer, activist, author, educator, and meditation practitioner. He also served as the founding dean of CUNY School of Law, and as a faculty member of various prominent law schools across the country.

Halpern is considered a pioneer in public interest law, responsible for various entrepreneurial and educational initiatives that contributed to legal, academic, social justice, and contemplative communities.

Halpern's book, Making Waves and Riding the Currents: Activism and the Practice of Wisdom, tells the story of how he brought public interest activism, mindfulness, and meditation into law schools and courthouses across the United States.

== Early career ==
Halpern earned his Bachelor of Arts in American history and literature from Harvard College in 1961 and his law degree from Yale Law School in 1964.

After finishing law school, Halpern clerked with Judge George T. Washington of the United States Court of Appeals for the District of Columbia Circuit. Halpern then accepted an associate position with D.C. law firm Arnold & Porter, which he held for four years.

During that time, he served as lead counsel in the case Rouse v. Cameron, 373 F.2d 451 (D.C. Cir. 1966), which challenged the adequacy of treatment being provided to an individual confined in a mental hospital. Halpern was later counsel in Wyatt v. Aderholt, 503 F.2d 1305 (5th Cir. 1974), which affirmed a constitutional right to treatment for individuals civilly committed to state mental facilities.

== Public interest law ==
In 1969, Halpern left Arnold and Porter and co-founded one of the nation's first public interest law firms, the Center for Law and Social Policy (CLASP) in Washington D.C. CLASP's idea of bringing the nation's emerging social movements into the courtroom was novel and much needed, and it attracted early support from legal leaders like former Supreme Court Justice Arthur Goldberg, former Attorney General Ramsey Clark, and former Secretary of the Interior Stewart Udall.

While at CLASP, Halpern served as counsel on a number of important public interest cases, including the seminal environmental cases concerning the construction of the Alaska Pipeline, see Wilderness Society v. Morton,479 F.2d 842 (D.C. Cir. 1973), and the banning of DDT, see Environmental Defense Fund, Inc. v. Ruckelshaus,439 F.2d 584 (D.C. Cir. 1971).

Halpern's advocacy for the mentally ill led him to co-found the Mental Health Project, later renamed the Bazelon Center for Mental Health Law, in 1971. In 1975, Halpern founded the Council for the Advancement of Public Interest Law, later renamed the Alliance for Justice.

== Academia ==
In 1981, Halpern was named the founding dean of the City University of New York School of Law, a new, accessible law school with an innovative curriculum and public interest-focused mission.

Halpern served on the faculty at Stanford Law School (1977–78) and Georgetown University Law Center (1978-81). He served as a Senior Fellow at Yale Law School (1987), and traveled throughout Asia in 1988, sponsored by the United States Information Agency to lecture on public interest law and new directions in legal education.

== President and CEO ==
Halpern was selected in 1989 to serve as the first President and CEO of the Nathan Cummings Foundation, a $400 million grant-making foundation in New York City, a position he held until 2008. Under his leadership, the foundation developed and supported many innovative philanthropic initiatives, including Healing and the Mind with Bill Moyers and the dialogues between the Dalai Lama and spiritual leaders of the American Jewish community.

The foundation launched a creative program in the area of contemplative practice that supported meditation retreats to bring together, inspire, and invigorate environmentalists, social activists, and cultural intellectuals. During this time, Halpern launched the Center for Contemplative Mind in Society, which worked to infuse a contemplative dimension into higher education, law, journalism, and business.

== Meditation ==
Halpern began practicing meditation with a variety of teachers in the 1980s, which greatly influenced his work. He moved to Berkeley, California in 2000 with his wife Susan Halpern, a psychotherapist and author of The Etiquette of Illness. Halpern's book, Making Waves and Riding the Currents: Activism and the Practice of Wisdom, which explores using meditation to cultivate inner wisdom and foster mindful social activism, was published in 2008.

Between 2009 and 2015, Halpern became an adjunct professor at Berkeley Law and taught a seminar called "Effective and Sustainable Law Practice: The Meditative Perspective." In 2011, Halpern was appointed by Dean Christopher Edley Jr. to be Director of the Berkeley Initiative for Mindfulness in Law, an innovative program integrating the benefits of mindfulness into legal education and law practice. The mindfulness initiative was built on earlier contemplative practice exploration at Berkeley Law, including the Mindful Lawyer conference, which drew nearly 200 lawyers, professors, and judges to Berkeley to discuss connections between law, meditation, compassion, and justice. Elements of these programs helped create templates for the mindfulness and law programs which have developed across the country in law schools and bar associations.

In 2015, Halpern and Daniel Carlin launched Transforming Justice to bring mindfulness into criminal justice reform, in order to make the system more reflective, compassionate, and respectful of the dignity of all individuals. Transforming Justice teaches mindfulness practices to prosecutors, public defenders, and judges.
