= Azadeh Kian =

Iranian-French academic

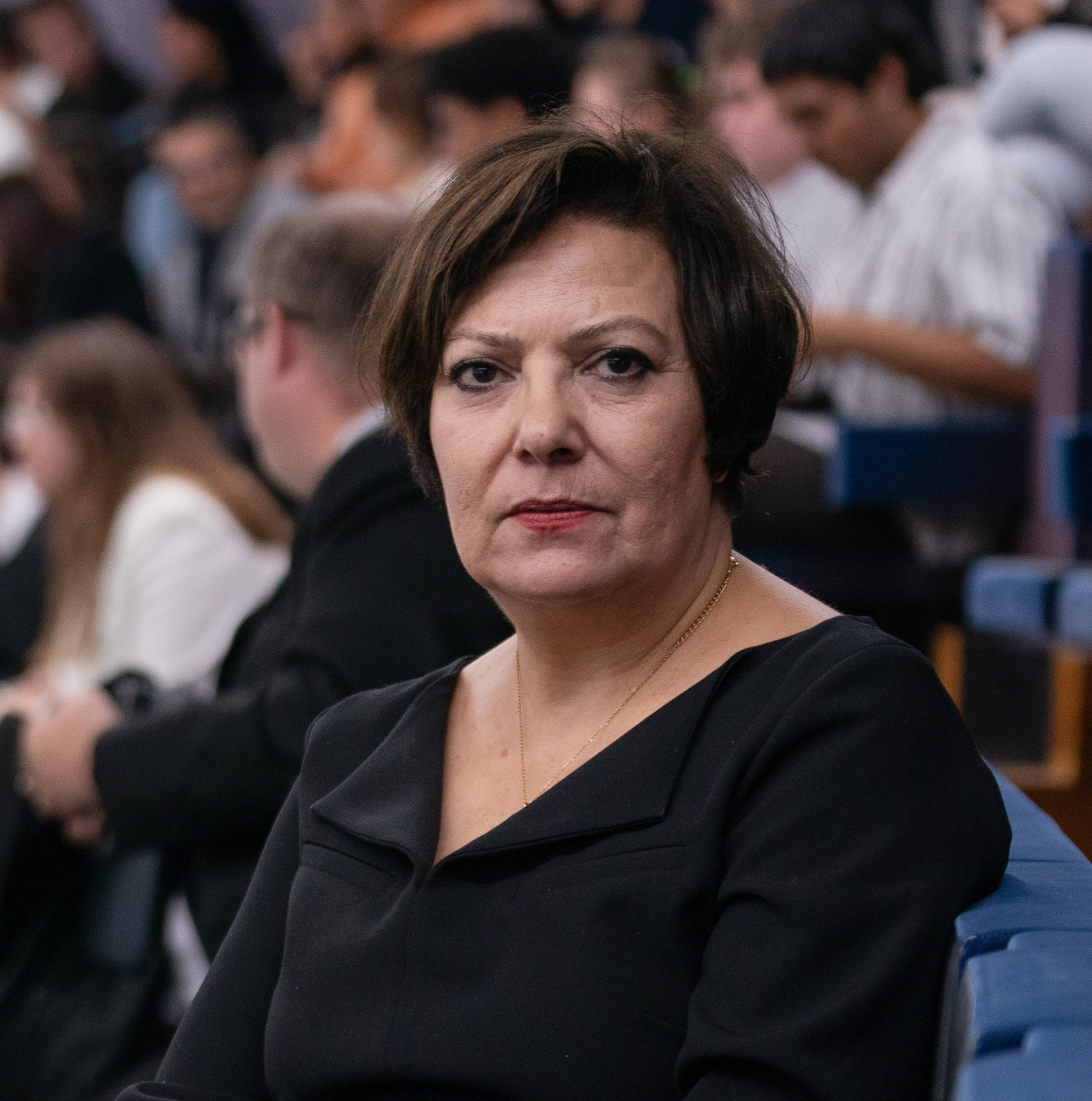
- Kian in 2022
- Born: 1958 (age 67–68)
- Awards: Latifeh Yarshater Award 2024

Academic background
- Education: University of California, Los Angeles (DPhil)

Azadeh Kian-Thiébaut (Persian: آزاده کیان; born 1958) is an Iranian-French academic, Professor of Sociology, director of the Social Sciences department and director of the Center for Gender and Feminist Studies at the University Paris Cité. She is included and recognized in the BBC project 100 Women.

== Education ==
Azadeh Kian is a prominent scholar in political sociology and gender studies, known for her work on Iranian and Maghreb societies. She earned her PhD at UCLA, where she was mentored by the political sociologist Michael Mann.

Her early academic career began with a teaching position at UCLA from 1987 to 1990, where she lectured in political sociology, a subject through which she developed a nuanced understanding of power structures, especially as they related to gender and politics in Muslim societies. She was mentor and PhD supervisor of Tiziano Peccia and Lucia Direnberger.

== Career ==
In 1995, Kian relocated to France, joining the faculty of University Paris III and later the University of Paris VIII Saint-Denis. This transition marked a pivotal moment in her career as she began to immerse herself further in interdisciplinary studies, focusing particularly on the sociopolitical dynamics of Iranian and Maghreb societies. She became a key figure at the CNRS (French National Centre for Scientific Research), where her research on Iran gained international recognition for its critical analysis of Islamic law (shari'a) and its implications for women's rights and gender equality.

Kian's work is characterized by her deep commitment to understanding the intersection of gender, religion, and state power. Her 1999 book, Avoir vingt ans en Iran (Alternatives, 1999), offers a vivid portrayal of Iranian youth, navigating the complexities of tradition and modernity in a politically charged environment. Her 2002 book, Les femmes iraniennes entre islam État et famille (Maisonneuve & Larose), further develops her exploration of gender, focusing on the ways in which Iranian women negotiate their roles within the Islamic state, family, and society. In La République islamique d'Iran : de la maison du Guide à la raison d'État (Michalon, 2005), she provides a comprehensive analysis of the Iranian political system, dissecting the intricate relationship between religious authority and state governance.

Kian has also contributed extensively to academic journals and public discourse. In 1996, her article "Des femmes iraniennes contre le clergé: islamistes et laïques pour la première fois unies" was published in Le Monde diplomatique. This article was significant as it highlighted the rare unity between Islamist and secular Iranian women in their opposition to the clergy's grip on power. In 2010, she continued her critique of patriarchal structures in her article "Islamic Feminism in Iran: A New Form of Subjugation or the Emergence of Agency?", published in Critique internationale, where she critically examined the contradictions of Islamic feminism and questioned whether it truly empowered women or served as a new form of subjugation. Her voice has been a persistent and critical force against the perpetuation of Islamic laws that undermine gender equality, advocating instead for universal human rights.

Kian's influence extends beyond academia into public life, where she is recognized as a key figure in the Iranian diaspora. The Vatican City Agency Servizio d'informazione religiosa (SIR) described her as "the most listened-to woman of the Iranian diaspora," emphasizing her role as a critical thinker and commentator on the political and social upheavals within Iran.

In 2020, Kian led as main editor the international work Genre et transgressions : Représentation, agentivité, autodétermination, a collective work published by Les Cahiers du CEDREF. This project brought together contributions from international scholars and gender researchers, creating a rich dialogue on transgression and agency in gendered experiences involving social scientists from both OECD countries and the Global South.

Her academic contributions culminated in 2024 with the publication of Rethinking Gender, Ethnicity and Religion in Iran: An Intersectional Approach to National Identity, released by Bloomsbury Publishing in Canada. This work earned her the Latifeh Yarshater Award, an honor bestowed by the Persian Heritage Foundation, in recognition of her exploration of the complexities of identity in Iran.

== Activism ==
She is among the most consulted Iranian diaspora women in the world to discuss the social and political evolutions of her native country.

She described the moment of Mahsa Amini's death as a pivotal turning point, marking a rare instance in which civil society directly challenged the authority of the Iranian regime: "What's unprecedented about these protests is that women are leading the charge." In October 2022, she addressed the European Parliament as an invited guest following a meeting with its President, Roberta Metsola, and received a standing ovation from Members of the European Parliament in recognition of her contribution. She spoke at Les Echos Belgium about talebanization of power in Iran. In November 2022, she affirmed that the crisis in Iran is a revolution aiming to change the regime, and not just a protest from civil society.

She condemned Israel's attack on Iran during a June 13 interview with France24, stating that the missile strikes targeted not only nuclear facilities but also civilian infrastructure. She emphasized that Israel's actions constitute a violation of international law and human rights, noting in particular that the concept of preventive war has no legal basis in international law.

== Selected publications ==
Azadeh Kian has authored numerous works on gender, politics, and social transformations in Iran and the Middle East, with particular attention to post-Islamist societies, feminist movements, and intersectional analysis. Her scholarship has been widely cited in Middle Eastern studies, feminist theory, and postcolonial studies.

=== Women, Politics, and Civil Society in Iran ===
Kian's early work explored the intersections of gender and politics in post-revolutionary Iran. In Women and politics in post-Islamist Iran: the gender conscious drive to change, she examines women's political mobilization in a rapidly transforming society. Similarly, her chapter Women and the making of civil society in post-Islamist Iran highlights the role of women in building democratic movements following the 1979 revolution.

=== Secularization, Modernity, and Social Change ===
Her book Secularization of Iran: a doomed failure? The new middle class and the making of modern Iran interrogates the limits of secularism in shaping modern Iranian society. She has also studied the urban middle class as a driver of modernity in Iran.

=== Feminism, Gender, and Postcolonial Studies ===
Kian is a leading scholar in feminist and postcolonial theory. Her article From motherhood to equal rights advocates: The weakening of patriarchal order traces the transformation of women's identities and activism. She has also contributed to theoretical debates, including Féminisme postcolonial: contributions théoriques et politiques and collaborative works on intersectionality.

=== Contemporary Iran and Gendered Identities ===
Her recent works continue to analyze the entanglement of religion, nationalism, and gender in Iran. In Rethinking gender, ethnicity and religion in Iran (2023), she interrogates the dynamics of gender and identity in multi-ethnic contexts. She also co-authored État-nation et fabrique du genre, des corps et des sexualités: Iran, Turquie, Afghanistan (2021), examining the construction of gender and nationhood in comparative perspective.

=== Notable Edited and Collaborative Works ===
Kian has also edited and contributed to collective volumes such as Les Femmes iraniennes entre islam, État et famille (2002), and has played an important role in directing Les cahiers du CEDREF, a feminist academic journal.
