= Howard Lesnick =

American legal academic (1931–2020)

- Born: April 22, 1931; New York City, New York, U.S.
- Died: April 19, 2020 (aged 88); Gwynedd, Pennsylvania, U.S.
- Occupation: Law professor
- Known for: Jefferson B. Fordham Professor of Law Emeritus
- Parent(s): George L. and Sadie (Rovner) Lesnick

Academic work
- Institutions: University of Pennsylvania Law School

Howard Lesnick (April 22, 1931 – April 19, 2020) was the Jefferson B. Fordham Professor of Law Emeritus at the University of Pennsylvania Law School.

== Early life and education ==
Lesnick was born into a Jewish family in New York City to George L. and Sadie (Rovner) Lesnick, the children of immigrants. Lesnick was raised in the Bronx, New York and in Bangor, Pennsylvania.

Lesnick had an AB in History from New York University (1952), an AM in American History from Columbia University (1953), and an LLB from Columbia Law School (Editor-in-Chief of the Columbia Law Review, 1958).

== Career ==
He was in the United States Army from 1953 to 1955. He was a law clerk to U.S. Supreme Court Justice John M. Harlan from 1959 to 1960, one of the first Jews to serve as a U.S. Supreme Court clerk.

Lesnick was the Jefferson B. Fordham Professor of Law Emeritus at the University of Pennsylvania Law School. From 1982 to 1988 he was the City University of New York Law School at Queens College Distinguished Professor of Law.

He was a president of the Society of American Law Teachers.

Among Lesnick's awards were the University of Pennsylvania Law School Beacon Award (2015), the Association of American Law Schools Deborah Rhode Award (2003), and the Community Legal Services Equal Justice Award (1994).

Among his writings are the books Religion in Legal Thought and Practice (Cambridge 2010), Moral Education (Longman 2004) (with J.F. Goodman), and The Moral Stake in Education (Longman 2001) (with J.F. Goodman).

== See also ==
- List of law clerks for the ninth seat of the Supreme Court of the United States
