= Michael Mann (sociologist) =

British sociologist (born 1942)

- Born: 18 August 1942 (age 84); Manchester, UK

Academic background
- Education: University of Oxford (BA, DPhil)
- Influences: Karl Marx; Max Weber

Academic work
- Discipline: Sociology
- Sub-discipline: Historical sociology
- Institutions: University of Essex; London School of Economics; University of California, Los Angeles
- Main interests: social power, the state, the military, war

Michael Mann FBA (born 1942) is a British-American emeritus professor of sociology at the University of California, Los Angeles (UCLA) and past honorary professor at the University of Cambridge. Mann holds dual British and United States citizenships.

== Life and career ==
Mann was born in Manchester, UK. He attended a local primary school, and then Manchester Grammar School.

Mann received a B.A. in modern history in 1963 and a D.Phil. in sociology in 1971 from the University of Oxford.

Mann was lecturer in sociology at the University of Essex from 1971 to 1977. He then became reader in Sociology at the London School of Economics and Political Science, from 1977 to 1987. Mann has been a professor of sociology at UCLA since 1987. He has been PhD supervisor of Professor Azadeh Kian

== Awards and honours ==
Mann has been the recipient of many awards.

- 1988 Distinguished Scholarly Publication Award of the American Sociological Association, for The Sources of Social Power. Volume I (1986)
- 1994 Gold Medal of the University of Helsinki
- 2004 Friedrich Ebert Stiftung Prize for the best book on politics published in Germany in 2003 for Incoherent Empire (2003)
- 2006 American Sociological Association's Barrington Moore Award for The Dark Side of Democracy: Explaining Ethnic Cleansing (2005)
- 2015 Member of the American Academy of Arts and Sciences
- 2015 Corresponding Fellow of the British Academy
- 2016 Honorary Degree of Doctor of Literature from University College Dublin.

== Academic research ==
Mann's main work is The Sources of Social Power (four volumes). The first two volumes of The Sources of Social Power were published in 1986 and 1993. The last two volumes were published in 2012 and 2013 respectively.

He also published several works on the twentieth and early twenty-first centuries. These include Incoherent Empire (2003), in which he attacks the United States' "war on terror" as a clumsy experiment in neo-imperialism. Two of his works, Fascists (2004) and The Dark Side of Democracy (2005), focus on fascism and ethnic cleansing.

His last work, On Wars (2023), covers the experience of war around the world throughout history.

Mann's work has been the subject of several critical assessments, including John Hall and Ralph Schroder's The Anatomy of Power: Social Theory of Michael Mann (2006) and Ralph Schroder's Global Powers: Michael Mann's Anatomy of 20th Century and Beyond (2016).

=== Social theory ===
One of Mann's main ideas is his IEMP model, where IEMP stands for distinct ideological, economic, military, and political sources of power. The four components of the IEMP model are defined as follows:

- Ideological power is seen as deriving from “the human need to find ultimate meaning in life, to share norms and values, and to participate in aesthetic and ritual practices with others.”
- Economic power is grounded in “the human need to extract, transform, distribute, and consume the products of nature.”
- Military power pertains to “the social organization of concentrated and lethal violence.”
- Political power is “the centralized and territorial regulation of social life.”

In this model:

- Counter to Marx, none of these sources of power is seen as determinative in the last instance. and
- Counter to Weber, Mann treats military power as distinct from political power. For Mann, “modern states formally monopolize the means of military violence” but that does “not end the autonomy of military power organization.”

In his theory of the state, Mann defines the state with four attributes:

1. "The state is a differentiated set of institutions and personnel
2. embodying centrality, in the sense that political relations radiate to and from a center, to cover a
3. territorially demarcated area over which it exercises
4. some degree of authoritative, binding rule making, backed up by some organized physical force."

Mann also suggests that Weber confuses two conceptions of state strength, those related to:

- “the distributive despotic power of state elites over civil society” and
- the collective infrastructural power, that is “the institutional capacity of a state, despotic or not, to penetrate its territories and logistically implement decisions.”

=== Wars ===
Mann's On Wars (2023) is a work that focuses on military power and its main mechanism, war. It covers wars in Rome, imperial China, the Mongols, Japan, medieval and modern Europe, pre-Columbian and Latin America, the world wars, and recent American and Middle Eastern wars.

== Reception of Mann’s ideas ==
Gianfranco Poggi questioned Mann's conceptual decision to treat military power as a distinct source of power and defended the classic distinction between economic, political and ideological power.

David D. Laitin challenged two thesis in Mann's The Dark Side of Democracy: Explaining Ethnic Cleansing: (1) that democracy and murderous ethnic cleansing are systematically associated, and (2) that genocide as a modern form of state murder is worse than other forms of mass murder.

A special issue of Studies in Comparative International Development focuses on Mann's concept of state infrastructural power.

Mann has responded at length to various critiques.

== Selected publications ==
- —— (1973). Workers on the Move: The Sociology of Relocation. Cambridge: Cambridge University Press.
- Blackburn, R.M.; Mann, Michael (1979). The Working Class in the Labour Market. London: Palgrave Macmillan.
- —— (1981). Consciousness and Action Among the Western Working Class. London: Palgrave Macmillan. ISBN 0-391-02268-7.
- —— (1984). "The autonomous power of the state: its origins, mechanisms and results". European Journal of Sociology. 25 (2): 185–213. doi:10.1017/S0003975600004239. JSTOR 23999270.
- —— (1986). The Sources of Social Power: Volume 1, A History of Power from the Beginning to AD 1760. Cambridge: Cambridge University Press. ISBN 0-521-30851-8.
- —— (1988). States, War and Capitalism. Oxford: Basil Blackwell.
- Baechler, Jean; Hall, John A.; Mann, Michael, eds. (1988). Europe and the Rise of Capitalism. Oxford: Basil Blackwell.
- ——, ed. (1990). The Rise and Decline of the Nation State. Oxford: Basil Blackwell.
- —— (1993). The Sources of Social Power: Volume 2, The Rise of Classes and Nation States 1760-1914. Cambridge: Cambridge University Press. ISBN 0-521-44015-7.
- —— (2003). Incoherent Empire. London: Verso. ISBN 1-85984-582-7.
- —— (2004). Fascists. Cambridge: Cambridge University Press. ISBN 0-521-53855-6..
- —— (2005). The Dark Side of Democracy: Explaining Ethnic Cleansing. Cambridge: Cambridge University Press. ISBN 978-0-521-53854-1..
- —— (2011). Power in the 21st Century: Conversations with John A. Hall. Cambridge: Polity.
- —— (2012). The Sources of Social Power: Volume 3, Global Empires and Revolution, 1890-1945. Cambridge: Cambridge University Press. ISBN 978-1107655478..
- —— (2013). The Sources of Social Power: Volume 4, Globalizations, 1945-2011. Cambridge: Cambridge University Press. ISBN 978-1-107-61041-5..
- —— (2023). On Wars. New Haven: Yale University Press.

== Resources on Mann and his research ==
- Anderson, Perry (1992). "Michael Mann's Sociology of Power". A Zone of Engagement. London: Verso.
- Blaut, J.M. (2000). "Michael Mann: The March of History". Eight Eurocentric Historians. New York: Guilford Press.
- Jacoby, Tim (2004). "Method, Narrative and Historiography in Michael Mann's Sociology of State Development". The Sociological Review. 52 (3): 404–21. doi:10.1111/j.1467-954X.2004.00487.x.
- Hall, John A.; Schroeder, Ralph, eds. (2005). The Anatomy of Power: The Social Theory of Michael Mann. Cambridge: Cambridge University Press.
- Schroeder, Ralph, ed. (2016). Global Powers: Mann's Anatomy of the Twentieth Century and Beyond. Cambridge: Cambridge University Press.

== See also ==
- Perry Anderson – British historian (born 1938)
- John A. Hall – Canadian sociologist (born 1949)
- Ernest Gellner – Czech anthropologist, philosopher and sociologist (1925–1995)
- Theda Skocpol – American sociologist and political scientist (born 1947)
- Charles Tilly – American sociologist (1929–2008)
