= W. Haywood Burns Institute =

Nonprofit organization in San Francisco, California

The W. Haywood Burns Institute (BI) is a nonprofit organization founded in 2001 in San Francisco, California, by James Bell, an attorney who represented incarcerated youth for 20 years. Bell named the BI after his friend and colleague, W. Haywood Burns, one of the founders of the National Conference of Black Lawyers, the founding dean of the City College Urban Legal Studies Program, and the dean of the Law School at the City University of New York (CUNY).

== Mission ==
The institute's mission is to reform juvenile justice systems across the country that disproportionately impact and incarcerate poor and youth of color. It works to reduce the adverse impacts of public and private youth-serving systems by teaming up with experts across the country in fields including mental health, immigration, and schools. The institute works towards ensuring fairness and equity throughout the juvenile justice system by working in sites across the country to bring together officials from law enforcement, legal systems, child welfare, community leaders, parents, and children. They follow a data-driven, consensus-based approach to change policies, procedures, and practices that result in the unnecessary detention of low-offending youth of color and poor youth.

== Programs ==
The institute's primary program, the Community Justice Network for Youth (CJNY), focuses on building the capacity of local organizations to improve their programs and engage in policy work. Through CJNY, the BI has successfully worked in over 40 jurisdictions across the country, leading to positive outcomes in reducing racial and ethnic disparities in the juvenile justice system.
