= W. Haywood Burns =

American lawyer (1940–1996)

William Haywood Burns (June 15, 1940 – April 2, 1996) was an American jurist, lawyer, author, professor, civil rights activist, the second dean of the City University of New York Law School (he served from 1987 until 1994) and a Civil Rights Movement leader.

== Biography ==
Burns was born on June 15, 1940, in Peekskill, New York. At the age of 15, he started a successful campaign to integrate a public pool in his hometown.

He graduated from Harvard College and from Yale University Law School in 1966. In between, on a Harvard fellowship studying in Cambridge, England, he conducted research on black Muslims that he turned into a book, The Voices of Negro Protest in America, published in 1963. After law school he worked for Paul, Weiss, Rifkind, Wharton & Garrison, clerked for Constance Baker Motley and then became an assistant counsel to the NAACP Legal Defense and Education Fund Inc.

Burns served as general counsel to Martin Luther King Jr.'s Poor People's Campaign and was one of the founders of the National Conference of Black Lawyers. He represented Angela Davis and prisoners after the Attica prison uprising.

After meeting with Nelson Mandela in Harlem, Burns was a legal advisor to the drafting of South Africa's interim constitution in 1993. He was killed in a car accident in Cape Town, South Africa, in April 1996.

== Legacy ==
The New York State Bar Association's most prestigious award for civil rights is named in honor of Burns.

== See also ==
- W. Haywood Burns Institute
