= The Dark Side of Democracy =

2005 book by Michael Mann

- Author: Michael Mann (sociologist)
- Genre: Political Sociology, Sociology
- Publisher: Cambridge University Press
- Publication date: 2004
- ISBN: 978-0-511-81727-4

The Dark Side of Democracy: Explaining Ethnic Cleansing is a 2005 book by Michael Mann which argues that democracy often leads to violent ethnic cleansing to make the nation more ethnically homogenous. Mann's argument was described as a provocative challenge to positive views of democracy. However, one reviewer stated that in his book Mann often qualified the linkage of democracy and ethnic cleansing, to the extent that the principal argument in the book could be summarized as "in all periods in human history political leaders have ordered or tolerated the murder of subsets of their populations", but in recent times victims are targeted for their membership in an ethnic group rather than place of residence or religion.
