= City University of New York Law Review =

Student-run law journal

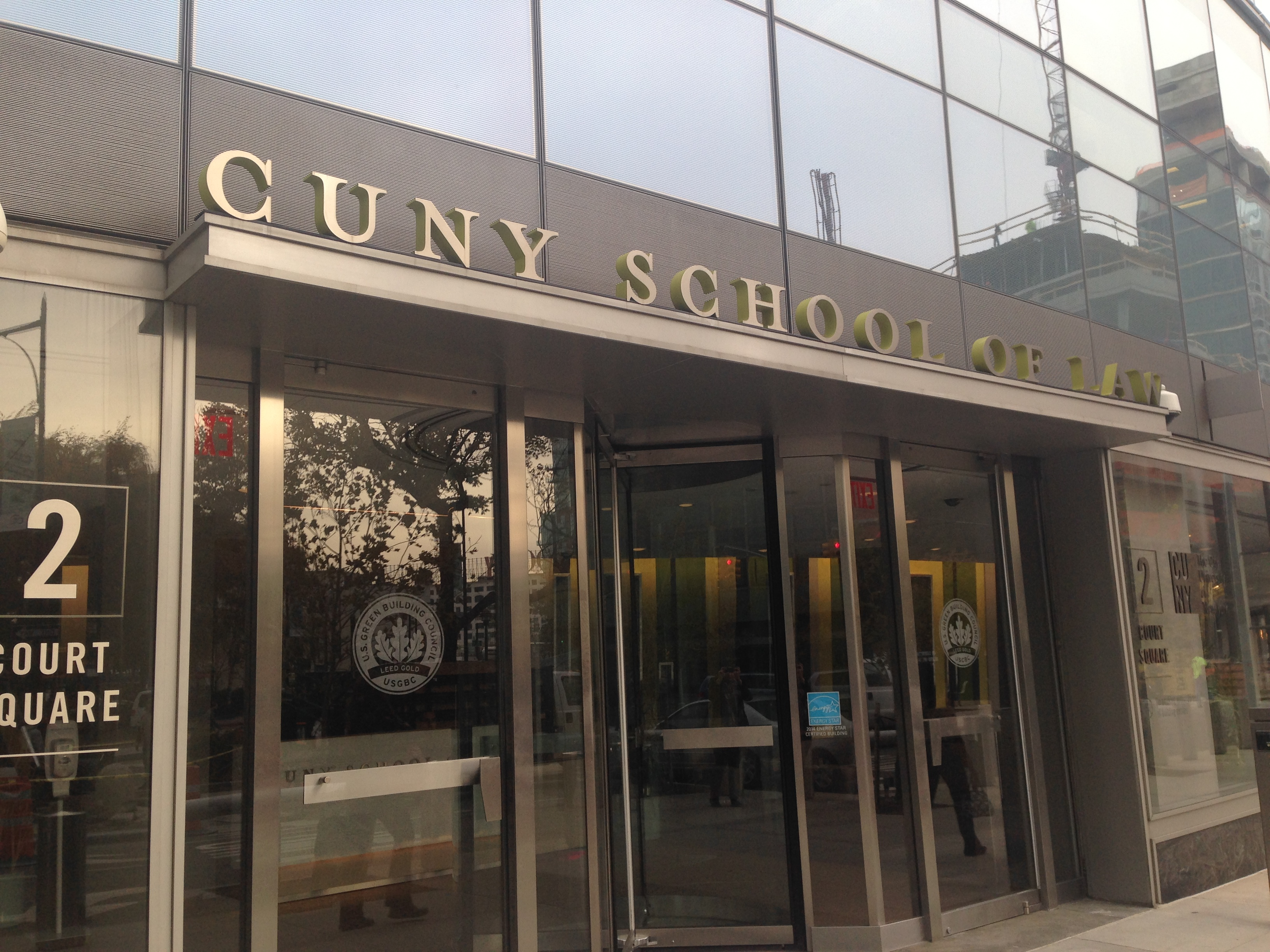
The CUNY Law Review is published by the editors and staff at the CUNY School of Law, which is located in Long Island City, Queens.

The City University of New York Law Review, commonly known as the CUNY Law Review, a student-run journal at the CUNY School of Law which publishes a law journal of scholarship on critical public interest and social justice issues. The law review publishes two volumes per year, with articles written by CUNY Law students, law students from other schools, professors, attorneys, and legal practitioners. Its editors are current students at CUNY Law.

== Overview ==
The CUNY Law Review was founded in 1995, with the goal of producing innovative public interest scholarship with an emphasis on supporting low-income communities, minorities, and other disenfranchised groups of people. The journal was originally named the New York City Law Review, but its title was officially changed to The CUNY Law Review in 2010. Having recently celebrated its 20th anniversary, the Law Review has published over 18 volumes and its coverage has ranged from topics such as housing, domestic violence, healthcare, same-sex marriage, abortion, foster care youth, home foreclosures, to the privatization of public parks in New York City, and beyond.

== Selection ==
Each fall, the editorial board of CUNY Law Review selects approximately 40-50 new staff members based on each applicant's personal statement, editing test, experience, educational background, and demonstrated commitment to public interest scholarship.

== Reputation ==
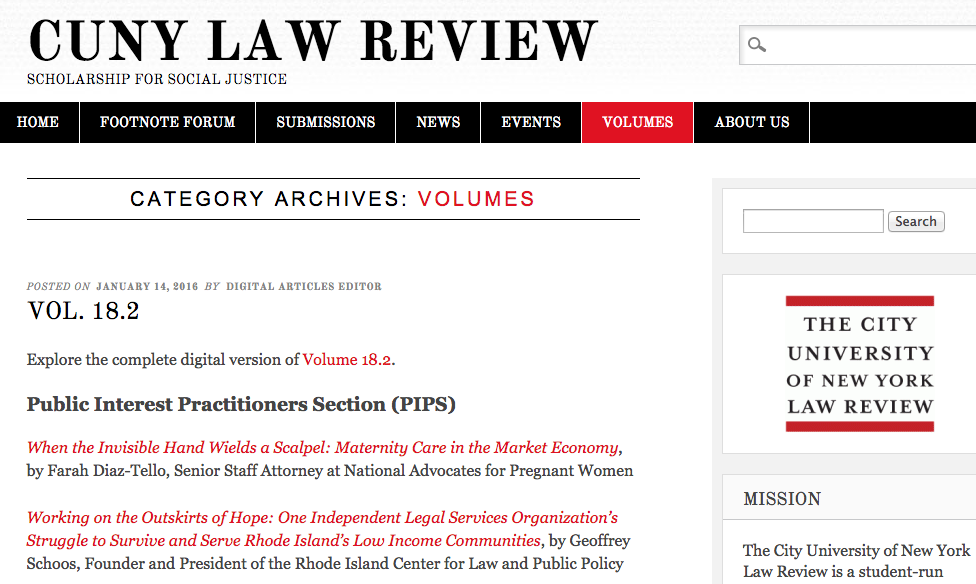
A web archive of the CUNY Law Review, Volume 18.2.

The CUNY Law Review is the only journal published by CUNY School of Law, and editors at the Law Review seek to ensure that CUNY's public interest goals are reflected in the Law Review. The CUNY Law Review is designed to produce work on critical current social justice issues, which is a large part of the law school's mission.

The CUNY Law Review was recently placed third among journals with key right disciplines in civil rights, and ranked ahead of publications such as Columbia Journal of Race and Law and Washington and Lee Journal of Civil Rights and Social Justice.
