= Marina Sitrin =

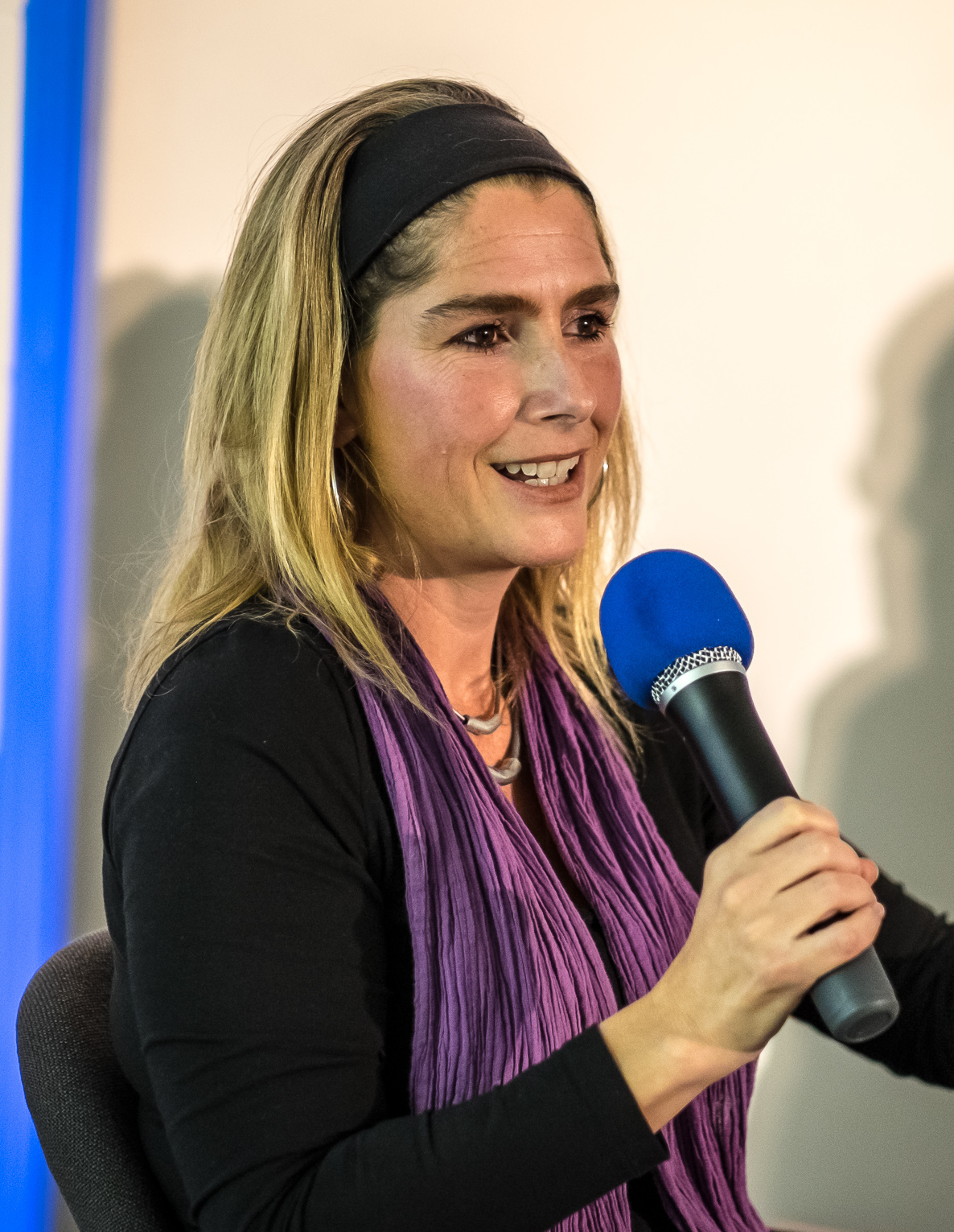
- Born: 1970 (age 55–56)
- Education: CUNY Law School, Stony Brook University, Binghamton University, CUNY Graduate Center
- Occupations: writer, professor, and activist. (https://sites.google.com/view/marinasitrin/home)
- Writing career
- Notable works: Horizontalism: Voices of Popular Power in Argentina (2005 Spanish, 2006 English), Everyday Revolutions: Horizontalism and Autonomy in Argentina (2012) They Can't Represent Us!: Reinventing Democracy From Greece To Occupy (2014)

Marina Sitrin is an American writer, professor, lawyer and activist.

== Biography ==
Marina Sitrin holds a PhD in Global Sociology from The State University of New York at Stony Brook and a JD in International Women's Human Rights from The City University of New York Law School. She is an Associate Professor of Sociology at Binghamton University. Previously, she was a Postdoctoral Fellow at the Committee on Globalization and Social Change at the CUNY Graduate Center in New York City.

She was involved in the Occupy movement from its inception. Among other things, she was a member of the Occupy Wall Street legal team. Involved in political activism since adolescence, she collaborates with various movements around the world.

Marina's work has been published in various publications, including The Nation, Yes! Magazine, La Revue internationale de sociologie comparée, Prensa Latina and the Huffington Post.

She is editor of Horizontalidad: Voces de Poder Popular en Argentina (Chilavert, 2005), which was published in English as Horizontalism: Voices of Popular Power in Argentina (AK Press, 2006). She is author of Everyday Revolutions: Horizontalism and Autonomy in Argentina (Zed Books, 2012). She co-authored They Can't Represent Us!: Reinventing Democracy from Greece to Occupy (Verso Books, 2014) and co-edited, with Colectiva Sembrar, Pandemic Solidarity: Mutual Aid during the COVID 19 Crisis (Pluto Press, 2020). Marina Sitrin is the co-editor, with Matt York, of Deep Commons: Cultivating Ecologies of Solidarity and Care Beyond Capitalism, Patriarchy, Racism, and the State (SUNY, 2026).
