= John A. Hall =

Canadian sociologist (born 1949)

John A. Hall FRSC (born 1949) is the James McGill Emeritus Professor of Comparative Historical Sociology at McGill University, Montreal. He is the author or editor of over 30 books. Hall holds British, Canadian and American citizenships.

== Education and Previous Posts ==
Hall graduated from Oxford University in 1970. He received his MA from the Pennsylvania State University in 1972 and has completed his PhD at the London School of Economics in 1976.

He has held previous posts at Southampton University, the London School of Economics and Harvard University. He was an Invited Fellow at the Swedish Collegium for Advanced Studies in the Social Sciences (SCASSS) in Uppsala, Sweden, during the 1999-2000 academic year, Visiting Research Professor (1999-2002) at Queen's University in Belfast, the Fowler Hamilton Fellowship at Christ Church, Oxford in 2003, the Institute of Advanced Studies at Durham University in 2017, the Rockefeller Teaching Fellowship at Princeton 2017-8 and a Fellow at the University of Edinburgh 2019-2014. He has been an Honorary Professor of Sociology and Politics at the University of Copenhagen since 2001. He served as Dean of the Faculty of Arts 2003-2005.

== Honours ==
He received the Prix Marcel Vincent in 2004 and the Prix du Quebec in 2016. In 2012, Hall was named a Fellow of the Royal Society of Canada. The RSC also presented him with the Innis-Gérin Medal in 2016.

An edited volume discussing his work was published in 2019 (States and Nations, Power and Civility: Hallsian Perspectives, edited by Francesco Duina. Toronto: University of Toronto Press).

== Academic Research ==
Hall is known for moving between sociological theory and history, claiming that social theory is based on too small a time frame with historical research often lacking sharp analytical questions. He has been influenced by Ernest Gellner, Michael Mann and Patricia Crone. His work on nationalism, states and empires is well known, as is his work in political economy and on liberalism and civility. He is the biographer of Ernest Gellner.

== Selected publications ==
- (2024) Nations States and Empires. Polity.
- (2024) `Adam Smith and Sociology'", European Journal of Sociology.
- (2021) The World of States, Co-author J. Campbell, Second Revised Edition, Cambridge.
- (2021) `Jewish Conditions, Theories of Nationalism', co-author L. Riga, Nations and Nationalism.
- (2021) What Capitalism Needs: Forgotten Lessons of Great Economists, Co-author J. Campbell, Cambridge.
- (2017) The Paradox of Vulnerability: States, Nationalism and the Financial Crisis. Princeton.
- (2013) The Importance of Being Civil. Princeton.
- (2013) Nationalism and War, edited with S. Malesevic. Cambridge.
- (2010) Ernest Gellner: An Intellectual Biography. Verso.
- (2006) National Identity and the Varieties of Capitalism: The Danish Experience. edited with J. Campbell and O.K. Pedersen. McGill-Queen's University Press.
- (1999) Is America Breaking Apart?, c-author C. Lindholm, Princeton.
- (1996) International Orders. Polity.
- (1994) Coercion and Consent: Studies on the Modern State. Polity.
- (1988) Liberalism, Paladin.
- (1985) Powers and Liberties: The Causes and Consequences of the Rise of the West. Blackwell (1986 Penguin.
- (1979) The Sociology of Literature. Longmans.
