= Infrastructural power =

Capacity of the state to enforce policy throughout its territory

Infrastructural power is the capacity of the state to enforce policy throughout its entire territory.

The concept of infrastructural power was introduced by sociologist Michael Mann in 1984.

== Building infrastructural power ==
Mann lays out four techniques by which the state gains infrastructural power. Together these factors aid in the state’s influence over society by increasing both the amount of contact residents have with the state and the benefits derived from this contact. To increase its infrastructural power, the state must:

- Provide centrally-organized services that are carried out through a division of labor. This distribution improves the efficiency of the infrastructure.
- Ensure the literacy of the population, which provides a means of informing the public about state laws and allows for a collective awareness of state power.
- Produce a system of weights and measures and a currency to facilitate the exchange of goods. The state must be able to guarantee that these goods ultimately have value.
- Provide effective systems of communication and transportation.

== Infrastructural and despotic power ==
The terms "infrastructural" and "despotic" have been used “to identify the two different ways in which a governmental apparatus acquires and uses centralized power.”

The simplest differentiation between Mann's two types of state power is that despotic power is power over society, while infrastructural power is power through society. Infrastructural power entails a cooperative relationship between citizens and their government, while despotic power requires only that an elite class can impose its will.

States do not utilize only infrastructural or only despotic power. The two types coexist within a state. In 1993 Mann clarified his definition of infrastructural power, indicating that despotic states rely on infrastructural power as they attempt to control their territory. The goal of an authoritarian state is to combine despotic and infrastructural power in a way that allows it the maximum influence over social life. The two types of power exist in tension in weak states; infrastructural power requires a level of cooperation and compromise between institutions that generally undermines despotic power.

A state whose power is primarily infrastructural can provide services throughout its entire extent, which decreases its likelihood of becoming a weak or failed state. Conversely, a weak or collapsed state has little chance of providing the type of infrastructure needed to ensure infrastructural power. In such cases, a state may rely on despotic power, or the power of elites over society, to maintain control.

== The modern territorial state ==
Infrastructural power has become more important since the time of the American and French Revolutions. As civil society gained political authority in Western states, despotic power became less accepted. As such, infrastructural power became considered a “positive” type of power; it is a source of legitimacy derived directly from civil society and therefore, at least in theory, directly from the people. Infrastructural power is fortified by the state’s ability to perform the services its constituents demand.

Imperial states and feudal states, both low in infrastructural power, depend on the despotic rule of an elite class for societal order. Monarchs and emperors of the past could not extend their direct rule to every aspect of social life without the aid of modern technology. Beginning with the Industrial Revolution, the infrastructural power of developed states rose rapidly. In the modern era, developed states became able to monitor their populations; provide employment, health care and welfare; impact all levels of the economy; and more. In this way, they obtained their infrastructural power.

The modern state system is more conducive to infrastructural power than past systems have been: states have bounded areas in which to provide services and the domestic sovereignty needed to provide these services without foreign intrusion. Mann argued that because states are territorially bounded and centrally organized, they have an advantage in power over other elements of society. As such, the autonomous powers of the state originate from its status as a bounded place.

According to Mann, the two governmental systems highest in infrastructural power are bureaucratic states, such as the United States of America and authoritarian states, such as China.

=== Bureaucratic states ===
“When people in the West today complain of the growing power of the state, they cannot be referring sensibly to the despotic powers of the state elite itself, for if anything these are still declining. But the complaint is more justly leveled against the state’s infrastructural encroachments. These powers are now immense.”

Nineteenth-century political scientist Max Weber outlined the characteristics of the bureaucratic state in his "Economy and Society." Weber emphasized the benefits of an even distribution of duties and power, the hiring of qualified officials, a hierarchy of authority and a written set of rules that can be universally learned and followed. The methods by which a state builds infrastructural power mesh perfectly with the establishment of a bureaucracy: literacy allows for a widespread comprehension of the written rules; a standard set of measurements and efficient systems of transportation and communication allow for greater efficiency in the distribution of authority; and a division of labor ensures that qualified officials in each field can take full advantage of their expertise.

Mann claimed that in the modern bureaucratic state, the government can "assess and tax our income and wealth at source, without our consent…; it stores and can recall immediately a massive amount of information about all of us; it can enforce its will within the day almost anywhere in its domains; its influence on the overall economy is enormous; it even directly provides the subsistence of most of us (in state employment, in pensions, in family allowances, etc.).” Without industrialization and the modern bureaucratic division of labor, the state would not be efficient enough to protect its own interests in these areas.

==== United States ====
“From Alaska to Florida, … there is no hiding place from the infrastructural reach of the modern state."

The US is an example of a bureaucratic state in which infrastructural power outweighs despotic power. Mann attributes this fact to the US' status as a modern, industrialized state. As a capitalist democracy, it has the advantages of an active civil society and a system of taxation; each provide means for increasing infrastructural capacity.

The government provides services throughout the entire US territory. As a result, the state is more politically and economically stable. In general, citizens have more time to concentrate on political and social activities because they do not have to worry about daily subsistence. Thus, civil society has a strong presence in the United States and provides an arena through which the government can affect daily life.

Politicians obtain legitimacy from sources outside the government, such as voters, financial donors and interest groups. Politicians are required to operate within the law. With these guidelines in place, civil society has the ability to check the power of government officials. The government cannot make decisions without some form of consent from the public. This gives civil society over the bureaucracy. As Mann puts it, “The secret decisions of politicians and bureaucrats penetrate our everyday lives in an often infuriating way, deciding we are not eligible for this or that benefit, including, for some persons, citizenship itself. But their power to change the fundamental rules and overturn the distribution of power within civil society is feeble."

Therefore, while the US and other modern bureaucratic systems employ some aspects of despotic power, such as sporadic corruption and opacity, a healthy economy and political participation greatly support the opposing infrastructural power.

=== Authoritarian states ===
Authoritarian states are high in both despotic power and infrastructural power because they can enforce despotic decisions using their bureaucratic infrastructure.

In an authoritarian state, just as in a bureaucratic state, infrastructural power exists through civil society. However, in the authoritarian state, the competing interest groups that compose this civil society often fight for complete control rather than simply to attain specific political goals.

As a politically repressive state with an active bureaucracy and a strong economy, China is an example of a state that employs both infrastructural and despotic power.

==== China ====
Throughout the region’s long history, the various forms of the Chinese nation have relied on despotic power. However, a growing state bureaucracy added to the infrastructural strength of the government over time. According to the US Department of State, successive Chinese dynasties created and developed, over thousands of years, “a system of bureaucratic control that gave the agrarian-based Chinese an advantage over neighboring nomadic and hill cultures. While securing geopolitical strength in this manner, the Chinese bureaucracy also guaranteed a domestically powerful state. With the establishment of a statewide Confucian ideology and a common written language, the government further infiltrated social life.

The communist, autocratic People’s Republic of China emerged in 1949. The regime was high in despotic power, but as it became more involved in the lives of the people, it became infrastructurally powerful as well. The approach resembled that of the Soviet Union, another authoritarian state that prioritized infrastructural power. The military, the Party and mass labor and women's organizations formed a strong civil society that provided infrastructural power in support of the state's despotic power. The government was thus inextricably tied to civil society, an illustration of Mann's comments on the infrastructural power of authoritarian regimes:

"Authoritarian is meant to suggest a more institutionalized form of state despotism, in which competing power groupings cannot evade the infrastructural reach of the state, nor are they structurally separate from the state (as they are in the bureaucratic type). All significant social power must go through the authoritative command structure of the state."

After the Communist revolution, the state instituted strict control over social life, including a ban on religion and a law that limited families to one child, seizing control over more personal aspects of day-to-day life. These policies were declared despotic, but enforced only through a strong infrastructural presence.

In 1989, a protest in Tiananmen Square turned into a tragic manifestation of the combination of infrastructural and despotic power. The Chinese government sent in the military to end a protest of the oppressive nature of the regime. In this case, the government relied on its infrastructural power to protect its despotic power.

China later opened to the international community. Thereafter, economic growth supported infrastructural power. As more development occurs, infrastructural power remained on the rise.
