= Jean-Marie =

- Gender: Male

Other names
- Related names: Jean, Marie

Jean-Marie is both a given name and a surname. Notable people with the name include:

- Jean-Marie Carroll (born 1956), English musician and composer
- Jean-Marie Abgrall (born 1950), French psychiatrist, criminologist, specialist in forensic medicine, cult expert, and graduate in criminal law
- Jean-Marie Charles Abrial (1879–1962), French Admiral and Minister of Marine of France
- Jean-Marie Andre (1944–2023), Belgian scientist
- Jean-Marie Auberson (1920–2004), Swiss conductor and violinist
- Jean-Marie Balestre (1921–2008), president of FISA
- Jean-Marie Basset (born 1943), French chemist
- Jean-Marie Beaupuy (born 1943), French politician
- Jean-Marie Benjamin, a priest
- Jean-Marie Beurel (1813–1872), French Roman Catholic priest
- Jean-Marie Bockel (born 1950), French politician
- Jean-Marie Boisvert (born 1939), Canadian politician
- Jean-Marie Buchet, Belgian film director
- Jean-Marie Cavada (born 1940), French politician
- Jean-Marie Charpentier (20th century), French architect and urban planner
- Jean-Marie Chopin (19th century), Russian explorer of the Caucasus
- Jean-Marie Collot d'Herbois (1749–1796), a French actor, dramatist, essayist and revolutionary
- Jean-Marie Colombani (born 1948), French journalist
- Jean-Marie De Koninck (born 1949), French-Canadian mathematician
- Jean-Marie de Lamennais (1780–1860), French Roman Catholic priest
- Jean-Marie Dedecker (born 1952), Belgian-Flemish politician
- Jean-Marie Delwart, Belgian businessman
- Jean-Marie Domenach (1922–1997), French writer and intellectual
- Jean-Marie Ducharme (1723–1807), fur trader and political figure
- Jean-Marie Girier (born 1984), French civil servant
- Jean-Marie Claude Alexandre Goujon (1766–1795), French journalist, lawyer, and statesman
- Jean-Marie Guéhenno (born 1949), French diplomat
- Jean-Marie Guyau (1854–1888), French philosopher and poet
- Jean-Marie Halsdorf (born 1957), Luxembourgian politician
- Jean-Marie Le Bris (1817–1872), French aviator
- Jean-Marie Gustave Le Clézio (born 1940), French author
- Jean-Marie Le Pen (1928–2025), French far-right politician
- Jean-Marie Leblanc (born 1944), French retired professional road bicycle racer
- Jean-Marie Leclair (1697–1764), Baroque violinist and composer
- Jean-Marie Leclair the younger (1703–1777), French composer
- Jean-Marie Lehn (born 1939), French chemist
- Jean-Marie Londeix (1932–2025), French saxophonist
- Jean-Marie Loret (1919–1985), French railway worker, claimed to be the son of Adolf Hitler
- Jean-Marie Lustiger (1926–2007), French cardinal of the Roman Catholic Church
- Jean-Marie Atangana Mebara, Cameroonian politician
- Jean-Marie Messier (born 1956), French businessman
- Jean-Marie Mokole, member of the Pan-African Parliament
- Jean-Marie Mondelet (circa 1771–1843), notary and political figure in Lower Canada
- Jean-Marie Morel (1728–1810), French architect
- Jean-Marie Musy (1876–1952), Swiss politician
- Jean-Marie Neff (born 1961), French racewalker
- Jean-Marie Pallardy (born 1940), French film director
- Jean-Marie Pelt (1933–2015), French botanist
- Jean-Marie Peretti, French researcher and teacher in human resources management
- Jean-Marie Perrot (1877–1943), Breton priest
- Jean-Marie Pfaff (born 1953), Belgian former football goalkeeper
- Jean-Marie Poiré (born 1945), French film director, writer and producer
- Jean-Marie Poitras (1918–2009), former Canadian senator
- Jean-Marie Raoul (1766–1837), French lawyer and musician
- Jean-Marie Riachi (born 1970), Lebanese arranger, composer and record producer
- Jean-Marie Roland, vicomte de la Platière (1734–1793), French statesman
- Jean-Marie Rouart (born 1943), French novelist, essayist and journalist
- Jean-Marie Souriau, mathematician
- Jean-Marie Straub (1933–2022), French filmmaker
- Jean-Marie Tjibaou (1936–1989), Oceanian politician
- Jean-Marie Toulouse (born 1942), Canadian academic
- Jean-Marie Trappeniers (1942–2016), Belgian football goalkeeper
- Jean-Marie Vianney (1786-1859), French Catholic priest and saint, known as Saint John Vianney
- Jean-Marie Villot (1905–1979), French cardinal of the Roman Catholic Church

== People with the surname ==
- Lincoln Jean-Marie (born 1966), British singer

== See also ==
- Jean Marie
- Jean-Marie-Rodrigue
- Louis-Jean-Marie
