= Gianmaria =

Gianmaria is the name of:

- Gianmaria Bruni (born 1981), Italian racing driver
- Gianmaria Dal Maistro (born 1980), Italian skier
- Gianmaria Potenza (born 1936), Italian artist
- Gianmaria Testa (1958–2016), Italian singer-songwriter and guitarist
- Gianmaria Zanandrea (born 1999), Italian footballer
- Gianmaria (singer), Italian singer-songwriter and rapper.

== See also ==
- Giammaria, given name
- Jean-Marie, given name
