= Armando Torres Chibrás =

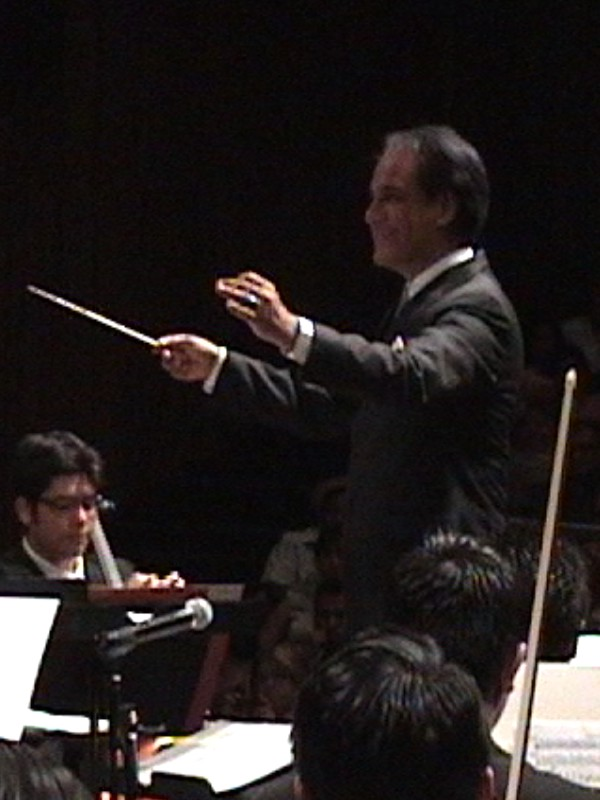
- Armando Torres Chibrás
- Born: Armando Ramón Torres Chibrás; Mexico City, Mexico
- Education: Doctor of Musical Arts in orchestral conducting, University of Missouri-Kansas City; Master of Advanced Studies in arts management (Diplôme d'études supérieures spécialisées en gestion d'organismes culturels), HEC Montréal; Bachelor of Music (Praktijkdiploma voor Direktie Orkest), Maastricht Academy of Music, (Conservatorium Maastricht-Hogeschool Zuyd), Zuyd University; National Conservatory of Music of Mexico
- Occupations: Orchestra conductor, writer, arts manager, scholar, educator
- Spouse: Katja Krause
- Musical career
- Genres: Classical

Armando Torres Chibrás is an orchestra conductor at Pershing Middle School, with extended activities as scholar, lecturer, academic jury, author and arts leader born in Mexico City. He is currently Head of the Orchestral Academy Program of El Sistema-Mexico (Sistema Nacional de Fomento Musical), an agency of the National Council for Culture and the Arts of Mexico.

Torres Chibrás has guest-conducted some of the Mexican leading orchestras, including the National Symphony Orchestra of Mexico, the Querétaro Philharmonic Orchestra (Orquesta Filarmónica del Estado de Querétaro), the UNAM Philharmonic Orchestra (OFUNAM), the IPN Symphony Orchestra, the State of Michoacán Symphony, the State of Puebla Symphony Orchestra, the Toluca Philharmonic, the Symphony Orchestra of the Autonomous University of the State of Hidalgo, the University of Guanajuato Symphony Orchestra, the Camerata of Querétaro Philharmonic, the Fine Arts Chamber Orchestra, or the Carlos Chávez Youth Symphony Orchestra. Torres Chibrás is as well the author of "José Pablo Moncayo: Mexico´s Musical Crest, " a biography of the Mexican conductor and composer of the celebrated orchestral fantasy "Huapango" for orchestra.

== Publications ==
- Torres-Chibrás, Armando (2009). José Pablo Moncayo: México's Musical Crest. Cologne: Lambert Academic Publishing AG & Co. KG. p. 208.
- Torres-Chibrás, Armando (2007). Drawing Near the World at the Dawn of the Third Millennium: Arts Management Training in México During the Administration of President Vicente Fox (2000–2006). Valencia: AIMAC-Universitat de Valencia. p. 9.
- Torres-Chibrás, Armando (2003). Round table speech. En búsqueda de una visión para la orquesta mexicana del siglo XXI: Realidades internacionales y aspiraciones nacionales (A Search for a vision about the Mexican Symphony Orchestra of the Twentieth First Century: International Realities and National Aspirations) (in Spanish). Mexico City: Mexico Puerta de las Americas-CONACULTA. p. 13.
- Torres-Chibrás, Armando (2002). José Pablo Moncayo, Mexican Composer and Conductor: a Survey of his Life with a Historical Perspective of his Time. Kansas City: University of Missouri-Kansas City. p. 416.
- Torres-Chibrás, Armando (1994). Políticas Culturales (Cultural Policies) (in Spanish). Mexico City: Educación Artística (INBA), Año 2, Número 7. pp. 16–19.

== Bibliography ==
- Armando Torres Chibrás. José Pablo Moncayo: Mexico's Musical Crest. Cologne: LAP Lambert Academic Publishing, 2009. ISBN 978-3-8383-2079-3
