= Mokole =

Mokole may be,

- Mokole language
  - Mokole language (Benin)
  - One of the Mokole languages of Guinea and Sierra Leone
- Jean-Marie Mokole

== See also ==
- Mokele-mbembe
