= François Desjardins =

Canadian business executive

- Born: 1970 (age 55–56); Montreal, Quebec, Canada
- Occupations: Retired president and CEO, Laurentian Bank of Canada

François Desjardins (born 1970) is a Canadian business executive. He held the role of president and CEO of Laurentian Bank of Canada between 2015 and 2020.

== Biography ==
Desjardins began his career at Laurentian Bank in 1991 within the branch network, occupying various positions in operations prior to joining the ranks of management.

He made a particular mark as Manager of the Bank's Telebanking Centre, assuming the role of Vice President in 1999.

In 2004 he was appointed president and chief executive officer of B2B Bank (previously B2B Trust). Prior to Desjardins appointment, B2B represented a mere 8 per cent of Laurentian's revenue and now, with $9 billion in deposits and $4.5 billion in loans, it accounts for 30 per cent of the bank's totals. Much of Desjardins success came from focusing B2B's efforts on key products and accommodating the needs of its clients, which now number 15,000.

In 2006, Desjardins became executive vice president of Laurentian Bank.

Desjardins received a Bachelor of Business Administration with a minor in IT technology from HEC Montréal École des Hautes Études Commerciales.

He currently splits his time between Toronto, Ontario, and Montreal, Quebec.

== Awards ==
In 2013 and 2014, Desjardins was ranked by Finance et Investissement Magazine as being among the most influential people within Québec’s financial industry.

In June 2010, Desjardins was named one of the recipients of Canada's Top 40 Under 40 award for 2009.

In 2007, Desjardins was named the "Best Young Executive in Quebec" by the Montreal's Youth Chamber of Commerce in their annual Arista Competition.

== See also ==
- B2B Bank
- Laurentian Bank of Canada
