= Jean Marie =

Jean Marie may refer to:

- Jean Marie (DJ), Italian DJ, producer, songwriter and remixer
- Jean Marie Antoine de Lanessan (1843–1919), French statesman and naturalist
- Jean Marie Balland (1934–1998), Roman Catholic cardinal and Archbishop of Lyon
- Jean Marie Brough, American politician
- Jean Marie Chérestal, prime minister of Haïti
- Jean Marie Higiro (born c. 1945), head of television and radio broadcasting in the Republic of Rwanda
- Jean Marie Marcelin Gilibert (19th century), French Commissioner in the French Gendarmerie
- Jean Marie Pardessus (1772–1853), French lawyer
- Jean Marie Stine (born 1945), American editor, writer, anthologist, and publisher

== See also ==
- Jean Marie River
- Jean-Marie
- SS Jean Marie, a number of steamships with this name
