= Mariam Dao Gabala =

Ivorian businesswoman and politician

Mariam Dao Gabala

Mariam Dao Gabala , born on 3rd march 1960, is an Ivorian businesswoman, politician, and women's rights advocate. Avocate for financial inclusion and women's skills development in Ivory Coast and in Africa.She serves as a Senator of the Republic of Côte d'Ivoire.

== Early life ==
After her baccalaureate, she attentes to Ecole Supérieur de Commerce d'Abijan, then She attended HEC Paris (1984)in France. and HEC Montréal(1987).

== Career ==
Mariam Dao Gabala was a Regional Director for francophone africa at the NGO Oikocredit from 20 years. She worked as consultant in women's entrepreuneurship in international labour office, in African.Development Bank , in International Labour Organization and in world Bank.She worked, from january 14, 2021 to may 4, 22 for the Ivorian Football Federation. InApril 2019, she was one of the thirty-three senators appointée by President Alassane Ouattara.

== Personal life ==
Born in 1960

She was born to a Christian father and a Muslim mother. She is the elder of 22 children, and responsible of her sisters and brothers.
