= Delwart =

Delwart is a surname. Notable people with the surname include:

- Jean-Marie Delwart, Belgian businessman
- Paul Léon Delwart (1874–1900), Belgian military officer
