= Giammaria =

Giammaria is the name of:

- Giammaria Biemmi, Italian priest
- Giammaria Mazzucchelli (1707–1765), Italian writer, bibliographer and historian
- Giammaria Ortes (1713–1790), Venetian composer, economist, mathematician, Camaldolese monk, and philosopher

== See also ==
- Gianmaria, given name
- Jean-Marie, given name
- Raffaele Giammaria (born 1977), Italian racing car driver
