= Yvan Stringer =

Yvan Stringer is a professor emeritus of economics at HEC Montreal, retired since 2005. He holds an L.Sc.comm, D.E.S. in applied economics from HEC Montreal and a Ph.D. in economics from York University.

Stringer was the director of the Institute of Applied Economics at HEC Montreal. He was also business manager of L'Actualité économique at HEC Montreal.

== Publications ==
- Stringer, Yvan; Raynault, Jacques (1988). Problèmes et politiques économiques (in French). Montréal: Presses de l'Université du Québec. p. 509.
- Stringer, Yvan; Raynault, Jacques (1988). Problèmes et politiques économiques - Solutionnaire (in French). Montréal: Presses de l'Université du Québec. p. 82.
- Stringer, Yvan; Raynault, Jacques; Weber, André-Paul (1989). Problèmes et politiques économiques - Solutionnaire (in French). Montréal: Presses de l'Université du Québec. p. 345.
- Stringer, Yvan; Raynault, Jacques; Townley, Peter (1994). Markets and Prices - A Policy Perspective (in French). Prentice-Hall. p. 361.
- Stringer, Yvan; Raynault, Jacques; Townley, Peter (1994). Markets and Prices - A Policy Perspective - Instructor's Manual (in French). Prentice-Hall. p. 67.
