= HEC Montréal =

Business school in Montreal, Canada

Coordinates: 45°30′12.71″N 73°37′17.17″W

- Hautes études commerciales de Montréal
- Type: Business School
- Established: 1907
- Parent institution: Université de Montreal
- Accreditation: AMBA, AACSB, EQUIS
- Affiliations: Université de Montréal, AACSB, EQUIS, AMBA, UACC, CBIE, Conférence des Grandes écoles
- Endowment: $127 million
- Director: Federico Pasin
- Faculty: 312 (2022)
- Administrative staff: 699 (2021)
- Students: 13,420 (2022)
- Undergraduates: 9,421 (2022)
- Postgraduates: 3,996 (2022)
- Location: 3000, chemin de la Côte-Sainte-Catherine, Montreal, Quebec, H3T 2A7, Canada
- Campus: Urban
- Alumni: 100,000+ (since 1907)
Colours
Blue and Black
- Website: www.hec.ca/en/

HEC Montréal (French: Hautes études commerciales de Montréal; lit. "High Commercial Studies of Montreal") is a public business school located in Montreal, Quebec, Canada. Founded in 1907, HEC Montréal is the graduate business school of the Université de Montréal and is the first established school of management in Canada.

HEC Montréal offers undergraduate, graduate, and post-graduate programs, including Bachelor of Business Administration (BBA), Master of Science in Administration (MSc), Master of Management (MM), Master of Business Administration (MBA), and PhD in Administration, in addition to a joint Executive MBA program with McGill University.

== History ==
HEC Montréal was founded in 1907 by the Board of Trade of Metropolitan Montreal. Its initial building in Viger Square now belongs to Bibliothèque et Archives nationales du Québec (BAnQ) (the building being named Gilles Hocquart Building).

In 1988, a group of HEC students established Jeux du Commerce, where more than 1300 students from 14 universities in Eastern Canada gather annually for academic, social, and sports events. A similar competition has been established in Western Canada called JDC West.

As of 2021, the centenary of the HEC Montréal Alumni Association, the school had over 100,000 alumni.

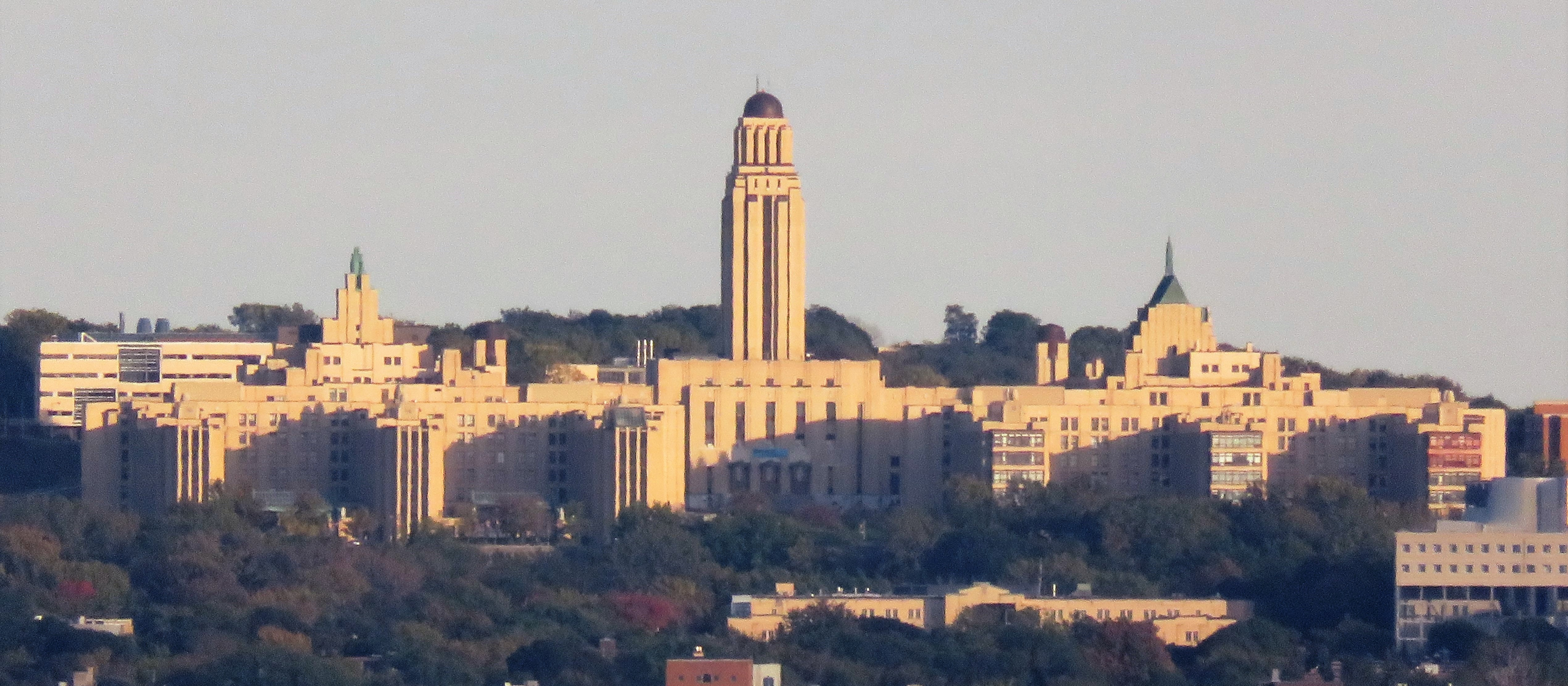
Université de Montréal, the parent institution of HEC Montréal, which is seen on the bottom right

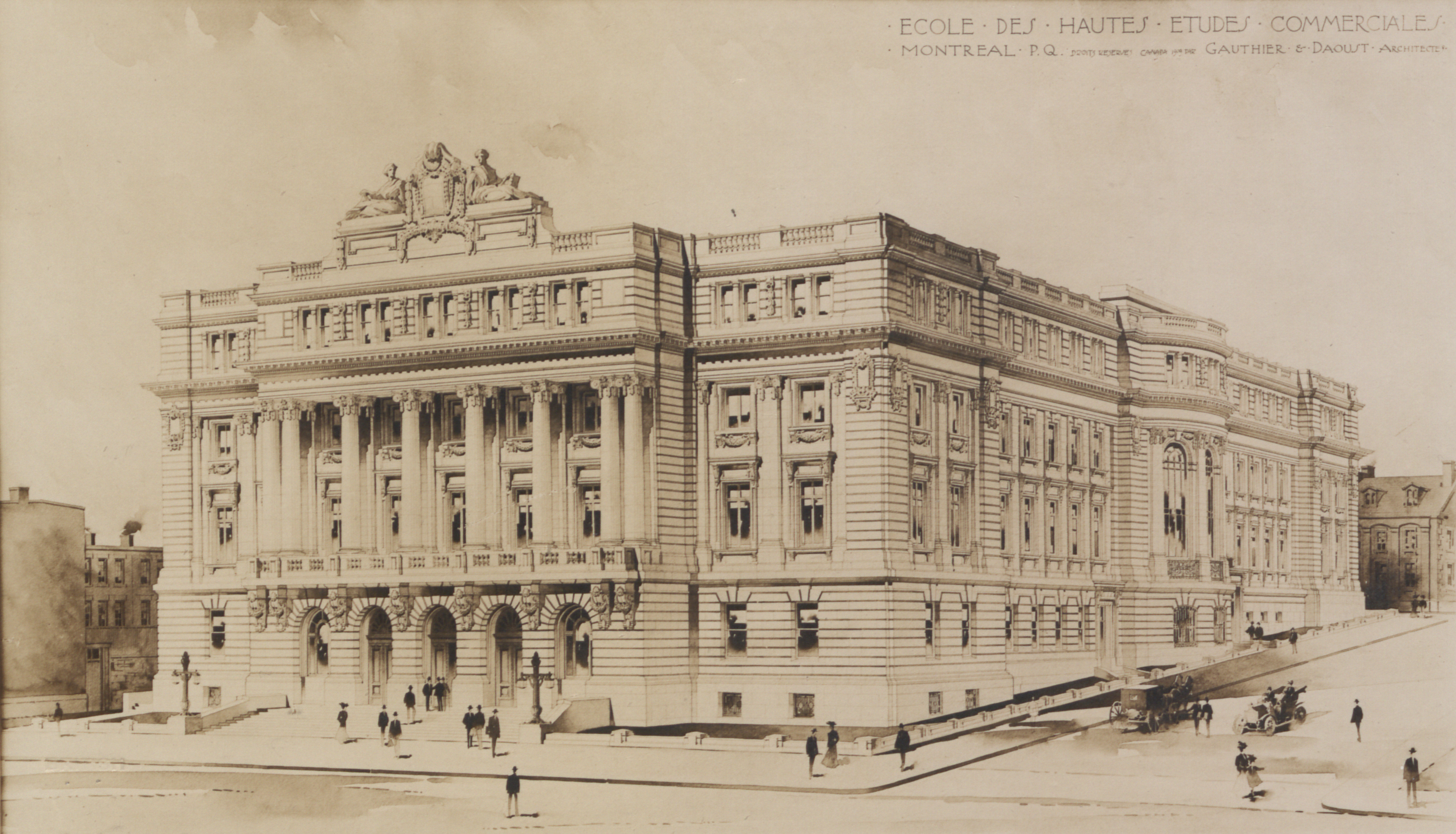
The school's oldest building: Square Viger

=== List of directors ===
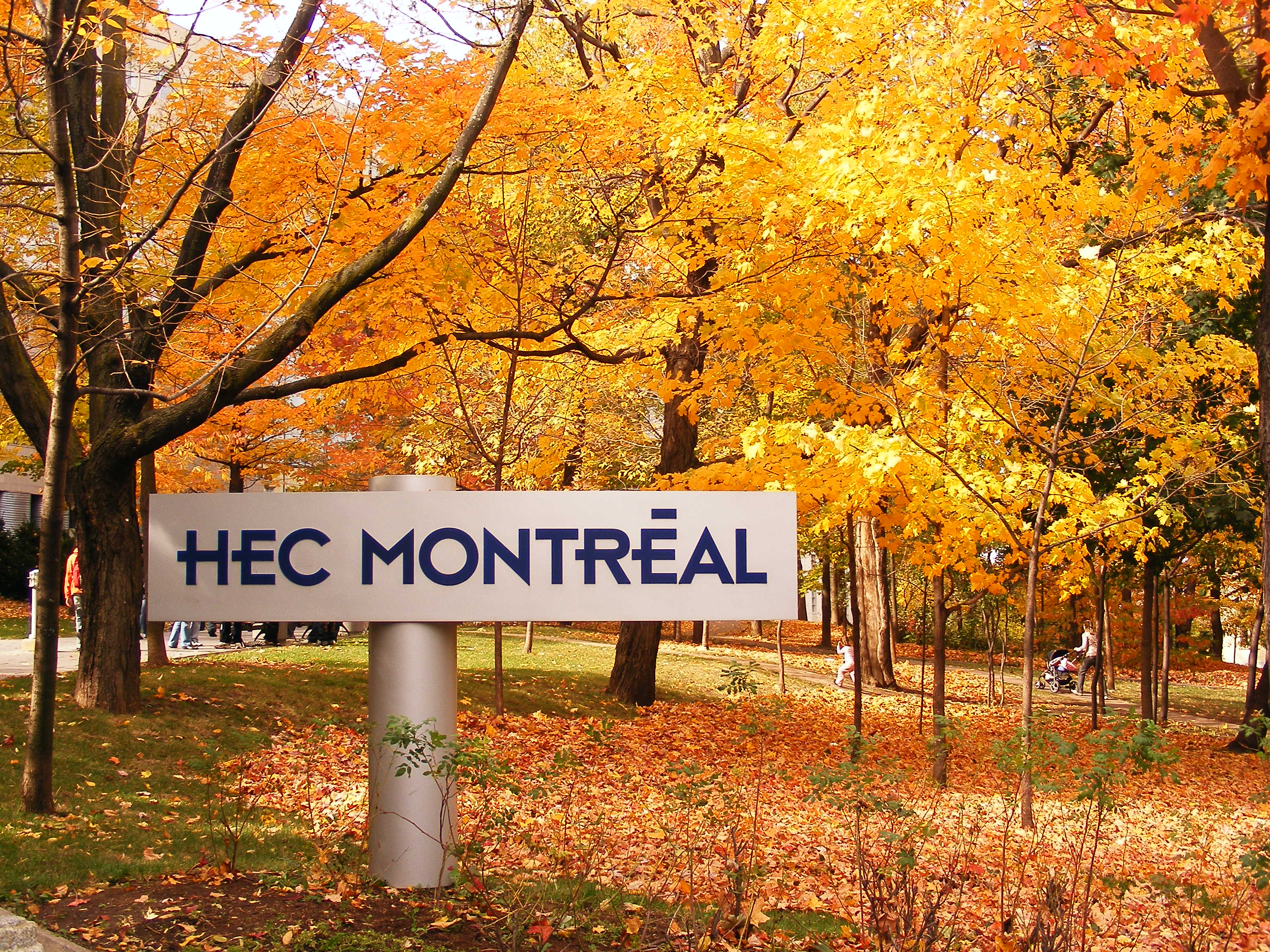
HEC Montréal's Signboard on an autumn day

	Years	Director
1	1907–1916	Auguste-Joseph de Bray
2	1916–1938	Henry Laureys
3	1938–1962	Esdras Minville
4	1962–1972	Roger Charbonneau
5	1972–1974	Paul Dell'Aniello
6	1974–1975	Roger Charbonneau (2nd time as Director)
7	1975–1982	Pierre Laurin
8	1982–1987	Pierre Harvey
9	1987–1995	Jean Guertin
10	1995–2006	Jean-Marie Toulouse
11	2006–2019	Michel Patry
12	2019–Current	Federico Pasin

== Reputation ==
Business school rankings

Global
- QS MBA: 141-150

CANADIAN BUSINESS

- Value Rank: 1st, among business schools in Canada (2016).
- Reputation Rank: 3rd, among business schools in Canada (2017).

BLOOMBERG BUSINESSWEEK

- Top 30 International Business Schools in 2015.

== Buildings ==
=== The Decelles Campus: 1970–today ===
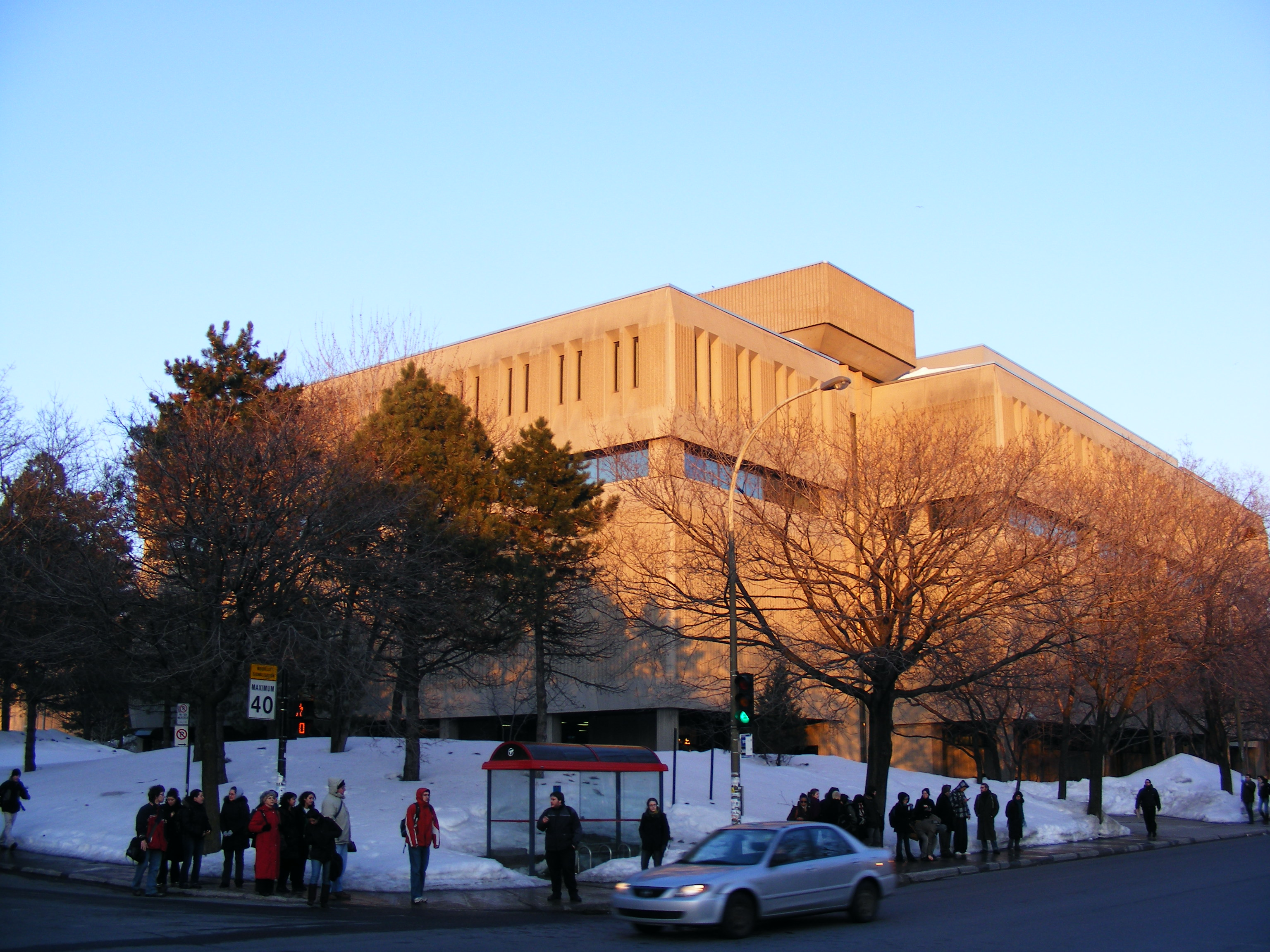
The Decelles Building

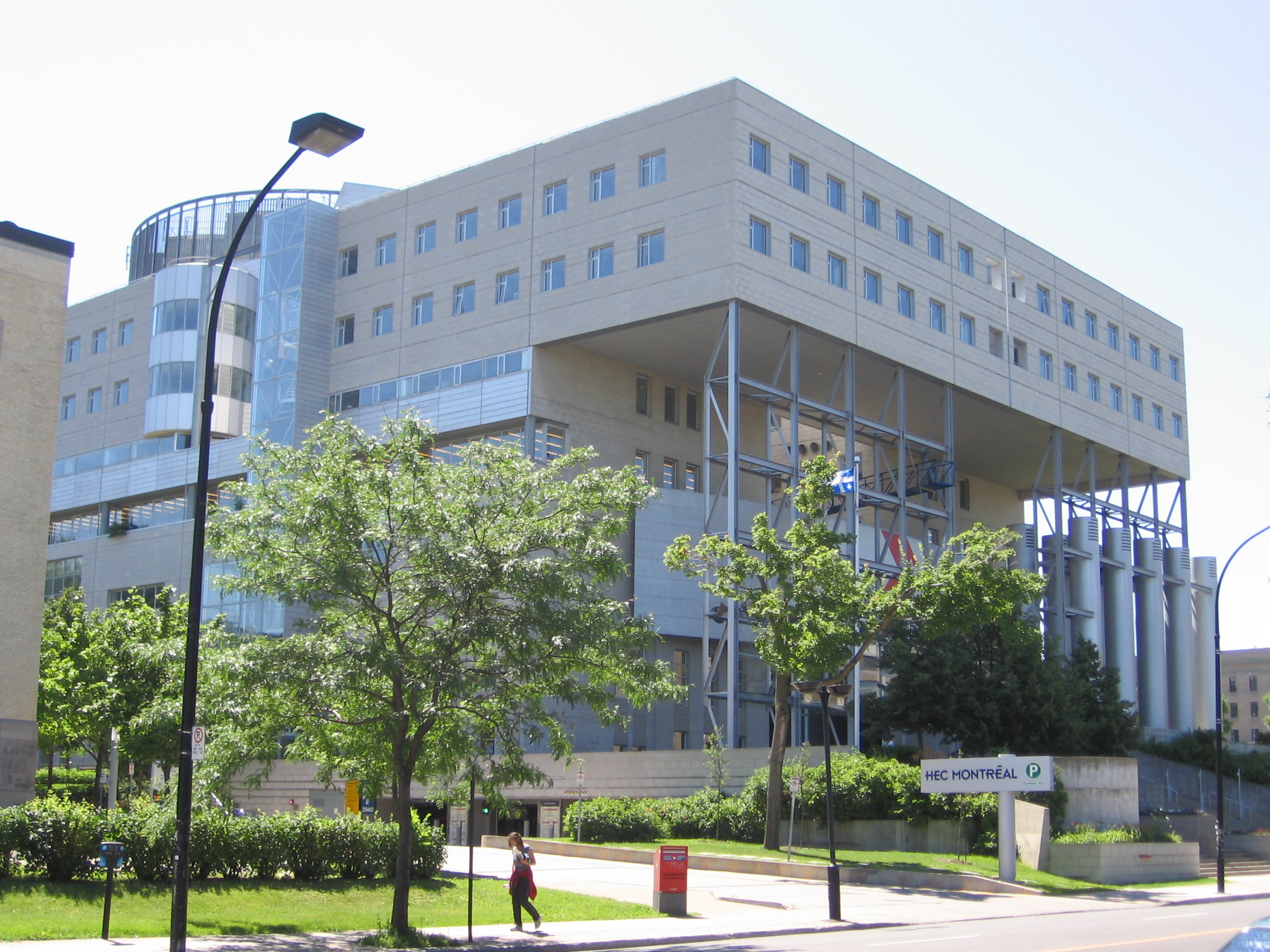
A side view of the Côte-Sainte-Catherine

In 1970, Robert Bourassa inaugurated the Decelles building of HEC Montreal, also known as "the School on the Mountain." The students sometimes use the expression "Bunker" to refer to it due to the use of concrete for the exterior façade and the absence of windows.

In 1976, the PhD program was proposed in collaboration with McGill University. The MSc program was created in the same year.

Under the presidency of Pierre Harvey, the 75th anniversary of the school was celebrated in 1982 with René Lévesque, then Premier of Quebec, in attendance. The 7th floor of the Decelles building was inaugurated on this occasion.

Between 2010 and 2012, the 3rd and 4th floors were renovated.

=== The Côte-Sainte-Catherine Campus: 1996–today ===
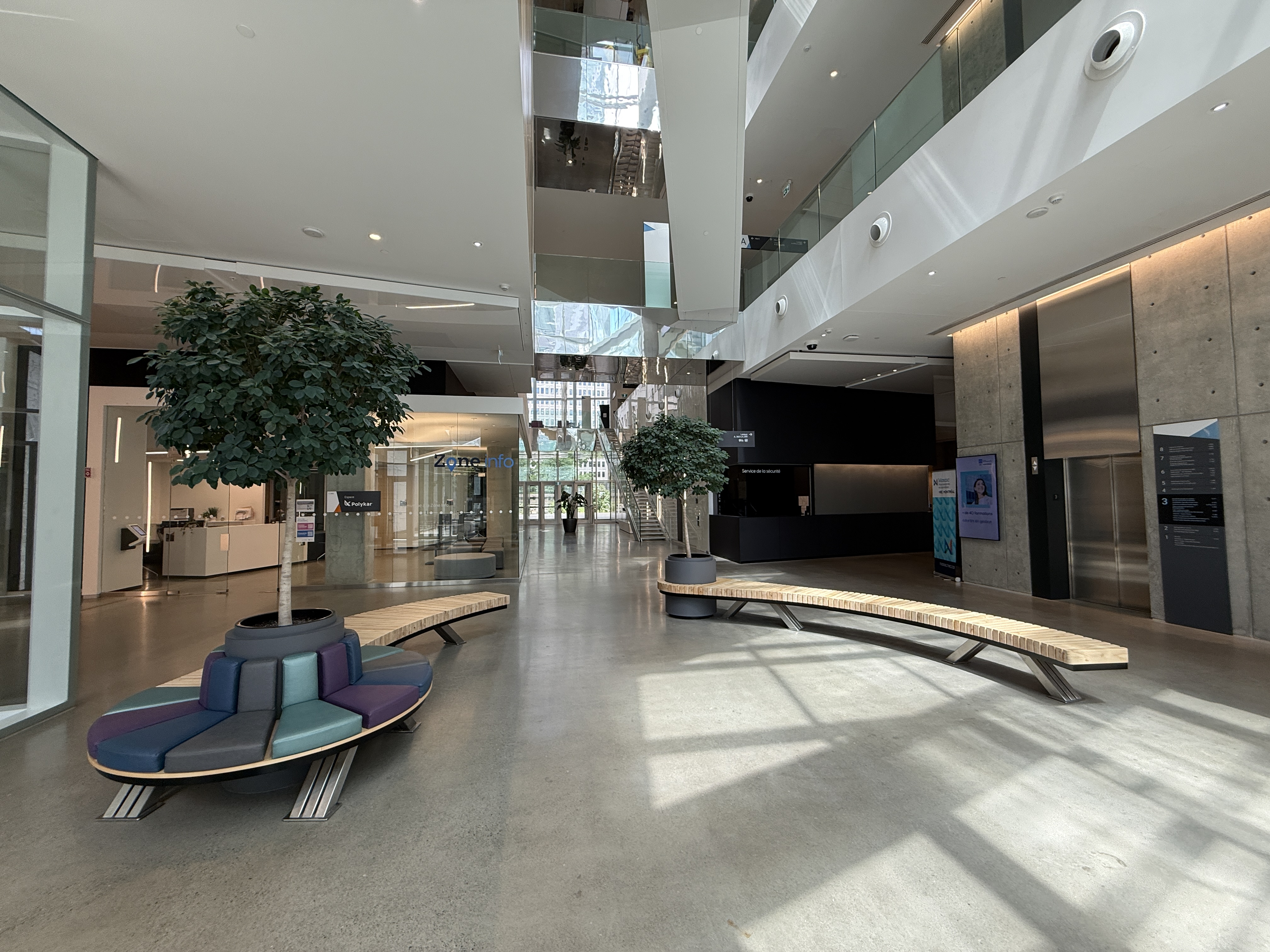
HEC Montréal - Édifice Hélène-Desmarais in downtown Montreal

HEC Montréal's main building was constructed in 1996 and has since won an award for "institutional architecture." The building was designed by Dan Hanganu and Jodoin, Lamarre, Pratte, and Associates and is situated at 3000 Côte-Sainte-Catherine (Map), next to the Université-de-Montréal Metro Station. The former main building at 5255 Decelles (Map) is now used as a secondary building. The first building used by HEC Montréal was located in downtown Montreal but is no longer used by the school.

The trading floor of the school was inaugurated in 1997, and it was conceived to be usable in case the Montreal Stock Exchange ever had significant engineering problems. Now known as the Salle des marchés Financière Banque Nationale, it was renovated in 2007 to remain technologically current.

== Noted alumni and faculty ==
=== Alumni ===
- Antoine Arnault: ex-CEO of Berluti and CEO of Dior SE
- Stéphane Bédard: Québec politician and lawyer
- Jean Campeau: ex-CEO of the Caisse de dépôt et placement du Québec and co-chairman of the Commission on the Political and Constitutional Future of Quebec
- Verònica Canals i Riba: Minister of Tourism of Andorra since May 22, 2019
- Louis R. Chênevert: ex-CEO of United Technologies Corporation
- Armando Torres Chibrás: Orchestra conductor in the National Symphony Orchestra of Mexico
- Caroline Codsi: President and founder of Women in Governance, and Board Member of Montreal Museum of Fine Arts
- François Desjardins: CEO of B2B Bank
- Jérôme J. Dufourg: ex-CEO, FC Talanta
- Robert Dutton: ex-CEO of Rona, Inc.
- Soraya Martinez Ferrada: Québec politician
- Anne-Marie Gélinas: Film producer and CEO of Emafilms
- Marie Gibeau: Québec politician
- Léo-Paul Lauzon: Professor of accounting at the UQAM and social activist
- François Legault: Current Premier of Québec and Founder of Air Transat
- Rémi Marcoux: Chairman of TC Transcontinental
- Pauline Marois: Former Premier of Québec (30th)
- Charles Milliard: Québec politician
- Daniel Paillé: Québec politician, economist and former Minister
- Jacques Parizeau: Former Premier of Québec (26th)
- Charles-Albert Poissant: Philanthropist and Canadian businessman
- Martine Ouellet: Québec politician
- Thierry Vandal: CEO of Hydro-Quebec
- Samir Trabelsi: CPA Ontario Distinguished Scholar and Professor of Governance and Accounting at Goodman School of Business

=== Faculty ===
- Ann Langley
- Gilbert Laporte
- Danny Miller (economist)
- Thierry Pauchant

== See also ==
- Higher education in Quebec
- List of universities in Quebec
- Canadian Interuniversity Sport
- Canadian government scientific research organizations
- Canadian university scientific research organizations
- Canadian industrial research and development organizations
