= Laurentian Bank of Canada =

Canadian bank

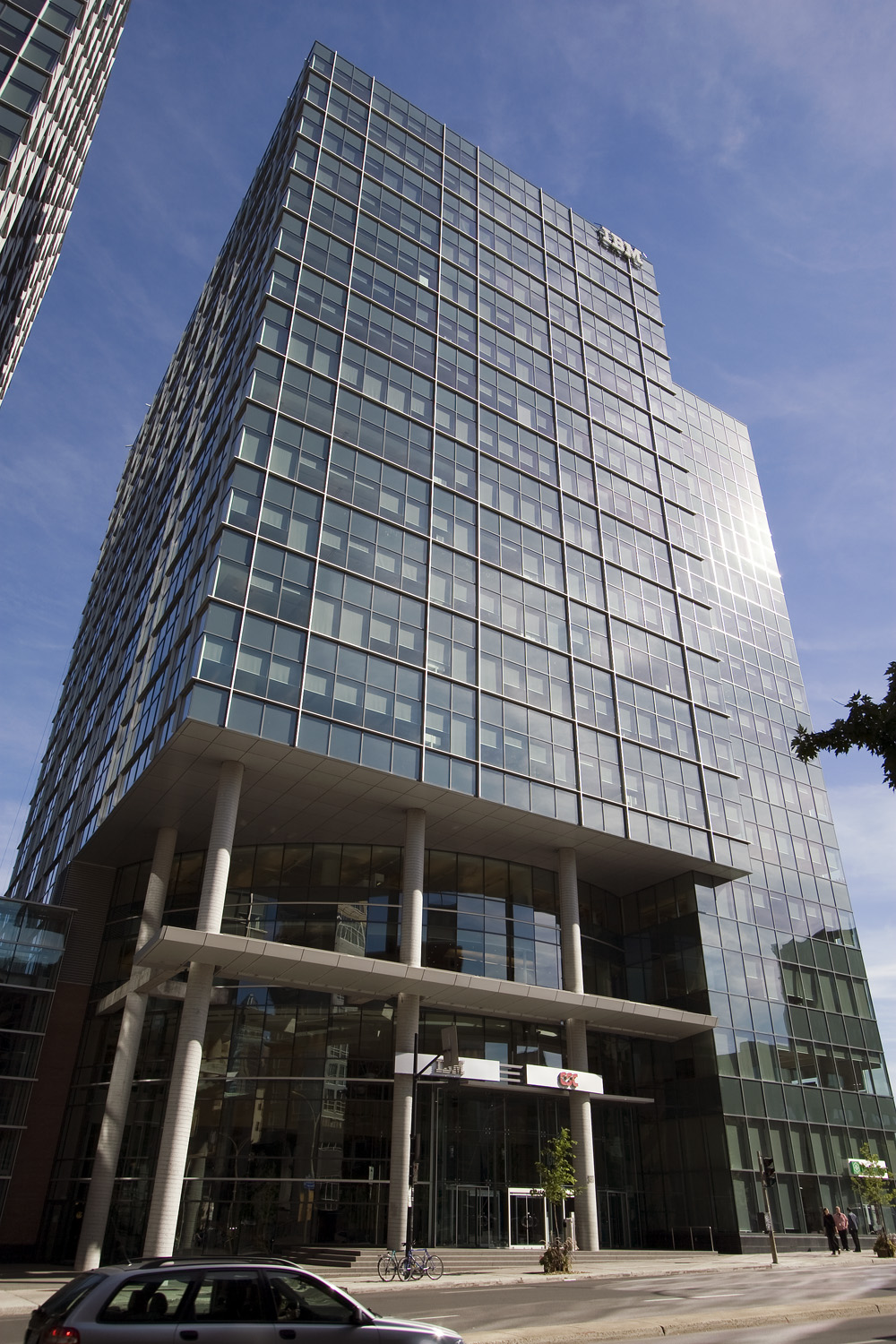
- Headquarters at E-Commerce Place in Montreal
- Formerly: Montreal City and District Savings Bank
- Type: Subsidiary
- Industry: Banking
- Founded: 1846; 180 years ago
- Founder: Ignace Bourget
- Fate: Personal and small business operations sold to National Bank of Canada; Remaining entity (and commercial business operations) acquired by Fairstone Bank of Canada on November 1, 2026
- Headquarters: Montreal, Quebec, Canada
- Area served: Canada
- Key people: Éric Provost (president & CEO)
- Products: Commercial banking products
- Services: corporate banking; investment banking
- Revenue: ▼ Can$1.02 billion (2024)
- Net income: ▼ Can$-5.5 million (2024)
- AUM: ▲ Can$3.30 billion (2024)
- Total assets: ▼ Can$47.40 billion (2024)
- Total equity: ▼ Can$2.83 billion (2024)
- Number of employees: 3,000 (FTE, 2024)
- Parent: Fairstone Bank of Canada
- Divisions: B2B Bank; Laurentian Bank Securities; LBC Capital; LBC Financial Services
- Website: laurentianbank.ca

The Laurentian Bank of Canada (LBC; French: Banque Laurentienne du Canada) is a Schedule 1 bank. Since November 1, 2026, it has been a subsidiary of Fairstone Bank of Canada primarily serving large business clients, having sold its other lines of business to National Bank of Canada.

The institution was established as the Montreal City and District Savings Bank in 1846. The bank's shares were publicly listed on the Montreal Stock Exchange in 1965 and the Toronto Stock Exchange in 1983. In 1987, the institution was renamed the Laurentian Bank of Canada. Prior to November 2026, it operated primarily in the province of Quebec, with commercial and business banking offices located in Ontario, Alberta, British Columbia, and Nova Scotia.

It was the only bank in North America to have had a labour union, some 1,100 positions becoming unionized in 1967, with the rest of non-managerial positions joining decades later. In 2017, there was a failed attempt by the bank to decertify the Canadian Office and Professional Employees Union, but a majority of workers voted for union decertification in March 2021, leading the Canada Industrial Relations Board to revoke the union's certification in April 2021.

On December 2, 2025, the bank announced it had agreed to be sold for C$1.9 billion to Fairstone Bank of Canada, which will retain its commercial banking business, with personal and small business banking operations being acquired separately by National Bank of Canada, pending shareholder and regulatory approvals. Under the split, all Laurentian retail branches would be closed, with branch employees only promised the ability to apply for any open roles at National Bank branches. The deal received full regulatory approval in August 2026 and officially closed on November 2, 2026, with all retail branches permanently closed on November 6. Fairstone will continue to operate Laurentian as a subsidiary under its existing brand.

== History ==
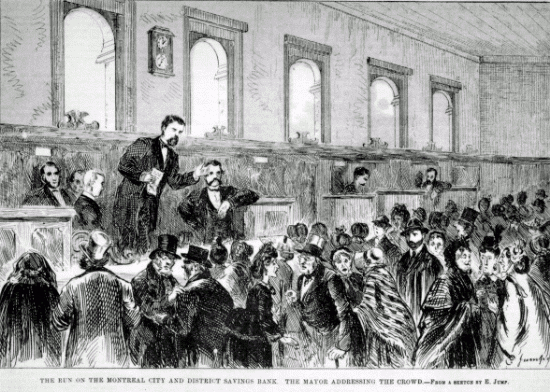
The mayor of Montreal addresses a crowd during a run at the Montreal City and District Savings Bank, 1872

LBC's history began in 1846 with the founding of the Banque d'Épargne de la Cité et du District de Montréal, or Montreal City and District Savings Bank, by Bishop Ignace Bourget and a group of 15 prominent individuals from Montreal, Quebec. The bank's 60 honorary directors included Louis-Hippolyte Lafontaine, Louis-Joseph Papineau, and Sir George-Étienne Cartier.

In 1965, the bank listed its shares on the Montreal Stock Exchange.

In 1974, the bank installed an ATM system called "Bancaide". Primitive by the standards of the following decade, the nonetheless revolutionary machine dispensed cash 24 hours a day.

In 1980, the Montreal City and District Savings Bank obtained the right to expand its operations throughout Canada. This expansion led to the institution listing its shares on the Toronto Stock Exchange three years later, and in 1987, the bank was renamed Laurentian Bank of Canada. In 1988, after more than a century (1871–1988) at 176 Saint-Jacques Street, the institution's head office moved to McGill College Avenue in Montreal.

In 1993, the bank acquired General Trust Corporation and purchased most of the Société Nationale de Fiducie's assets from the brokerage firm BLC Rousseau, thus creating Laurentian Bank Securities (LBS).

In 2000, it acquired all Sun Life Trust Company stock in a transaction that resulted in the creation of the new B2B Trust subsidiary, now known as B2B Bank.

In 2016, the bank relocated all of its Montreal offices, including its headquarters on McGill College Avenue, into a single building at 1360 Rene Levesque Boulevard West in Montreal.

In 2020, Rania Llewellyn was named president and CEO replacing acting CEO Stephane Therrien who had been serving as president and chief executive since Francois Desjardins retired in June 2020.

On October 2 2023, Laurentian Bank announced the departure of CEO Rania Llewellyn and Chairman of the Board Michael Mueller. Ms. Llewellyn was replaced by M. Éric Provost.

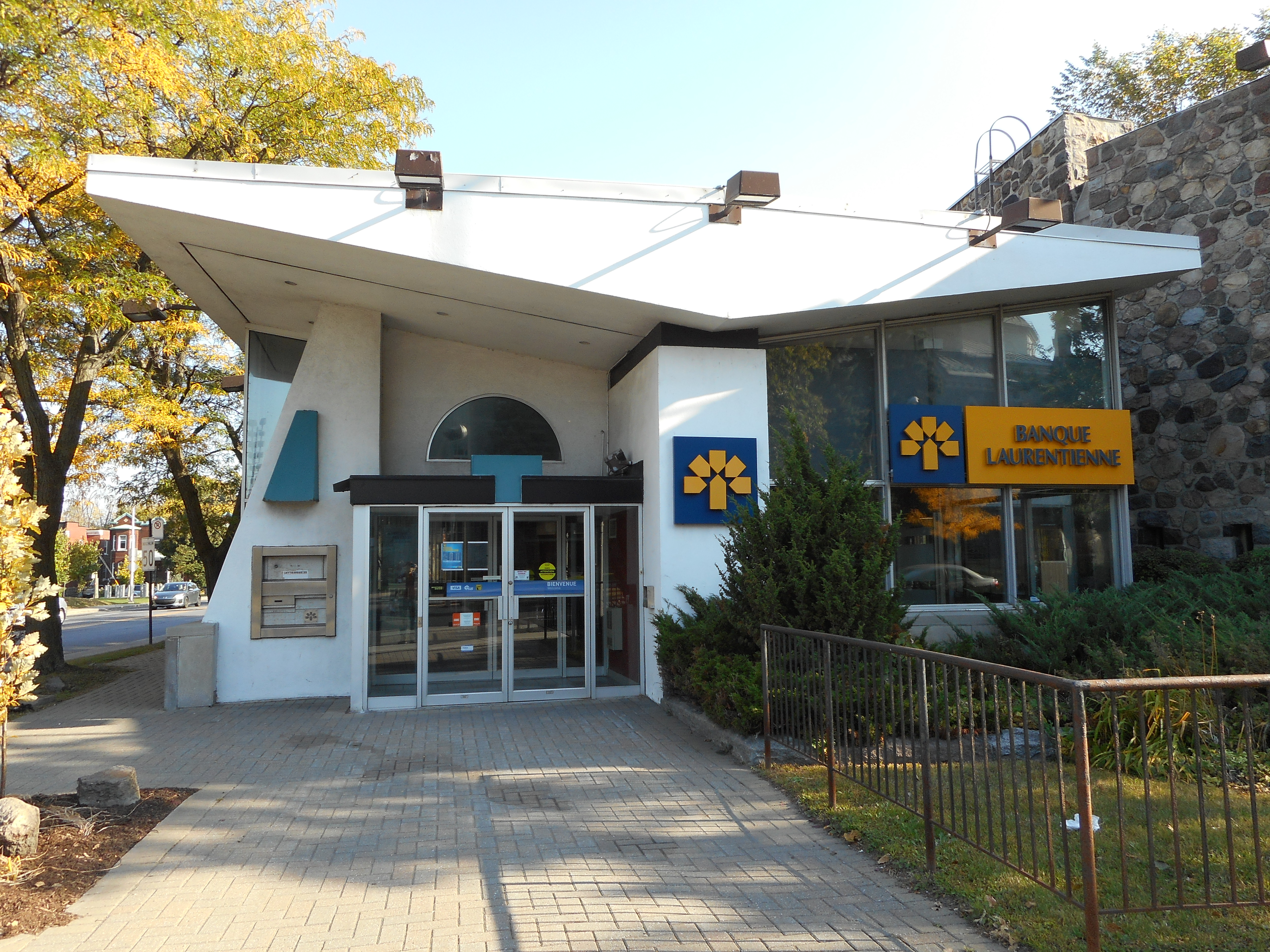
A Laurentian Bank branch in Longueuil

=== Mergers and acquisitions ===
The bank merged with Eaton Trust Company (in 1988), purchased Standard Trust's assets (1991), acquired La Financière Coopérants Prêts-Épargne Inc., and Guardian Trust Company in Ontario (1992), acquired General Trust Corporation in Ontario, and purchased some Société Nationale de Fiducie assets and the brokerage firm BLC Rousseau (1993).

In 1993, the Desjardins-Laurentian Financial Corporation became the new majority shareholder of Laurentian Bank of Canada, following the merging of the Laurentian Group Corporation with the Desjardins Group. The bank purchased the Manulife Bank of Canada's banking service network and the assets of Prenor Trust Company of Canada in 1994.

In 1995, the bank acquired 30 branches of the North American Trust Company.

In 1996, one of its subsidiaries acquired the parent corporation of Trust Prêt et Revenu du Canada. A few months later, the withdrawal of its main shareholder, Desjardins-Laurentian Financial Corporation, prompted the Laurentian Bank to become a Schedule 1 Bank under the Bank Act, on par with all the other large Canadian banks.

In 2023, Laurentian Bank launched a new line of Visa credit cards in partnership with Brim Financial. The new system provides digital onboarding and instant adjudication, instant virtual card issuance, mobile wallet functionality and self-serve card management options including setting credit limits and replacement of lost cards.

== Membership ==
LBC was a member of the Canadian Bankers Association and registered member with the Canada Deposit Insurance Corporation, a federal agency insuring deposits at all of Canada's chartered banks. It was also a member of Interac.

== See also ==
- List of banks and credit unions in Canada
