= Ann Langley =

Canadian economist

- Born: 1950 (age 75–76); Bristol, UK
- Spouse: Gilbert Laporte (m. 1974)
- Children: 1

Academic background
- Education: B.A., Mathematics, 1971, University of Oxford; M.A., Operations Research, 1972, University of Lancaster; PhD., 1987, HEC Montréal
- Thesis: The role of formal analysis in organizations (1987)

Academic work
- Discipline: Economy
- Institutions: HEC Montréal; Université du Québec à Montréal
- Main interests: strategy, health management and research methodolog

Ann Langley FRSC is a British-Canadian economist. She holds the Canada Research Chair in Strategic Management Research in a Pluralistic Environment at HEC Montréal. She is a Distinguished Research Environment Professor at Warwick Business School and an adjunct professor at the Norwegian School of Economics and Business Administration, the University of Montreal, and the University of Gothenburg. Langley is interested in strategy, health management and research methodology.

== Early life and education ==
Langley was born in Bristol, England and graduated from the University of Oxford and University of Lancaster before obtaining her Doctor of Management from HEC Montréal in 1987.

== Career ==
While her husband earned his PhD, they lived in London and Langley worked at Mars Ltd in Slough. When the family moved to Montreal, she learned French and worked in the health care sector while earning her own PhD in management from HEC Montréal.

After earning her PhD, she accepted a position in the School of Management Sciences at the Université du Québec à Montréal until 2000 when she joined HEC Montréal as a full professor. Upon her arrival at HEC Montréal, Langley became the director of the MSc and PhD programs from 2003 to 2006. In 2007, she was awarded the Medal for Teaching Excellence by the International Conference of Heads of Higher Education Institutions and French- Language Management Research. She also became co-director of the Study Group on practice of strategy at HEC Montréal. In 2008, she was named the Canada Research Chair in Strategic Management in Pluralistic Settings.

In 2010, Langley was elected a Fellow of the Royal Society of Canada in their Academy of Social Sciences. The following year, she was the recipient of an honorary doctorate from the Norwegian School of Economics and Business Administration.

In 2014, she was the recipient of the Pierre Laurin Award for excellence in teaching and research. Two years later, Langley was nominated by Howard Thomas and eventually elected a Fellow of the Academy of Management. She also received an honorary doctorate from the Aalto University School of Business. The following year, she was presented with the 2018 Thérèse Gouin Décarie Award. In 2019, Langley was named an Honorary Member of the European Group for Organizational Studies (EGOS) and sat on the Scientific Committee of the Alphonse and Dorimène Desjardins International Institute for Cooperatives.

Langley is co-editor of Strategic Organization and editor-in-chief of Organization Studies. She sits on board of the European Group for Organizational Studies as chair of the EGOS Organizing Committee.

== Personal life ==
Langley married full professor Gilbert Laporte on August 3, 1974. Their daughter is an assistant professor at École de Technologie Supérieure.
