= Ivorian Football Federation =

Governing body of association football in Côte d'Ivoire

CAF
- Founded: 1960
- FIFA affiliation: 1964
- CAF affiliation: 1965
- President: Yacine Idriss Diallo
- Website: www.fifciv.com

The Ivorian Football Federation (French: Fédération Ivoirienne de Football; FIF) is the governing body of football in Ivory Coast and is in charge of the Ivory Coast national team and other footballing matters in the country.

== Staff ==
- (Ivory Coast) Mariam Dao Gabala

The top teams are as follows:
