= Rania Llewellyn =

Kuwaiti-Canadian banking executive

Rania Llewellyn (born March 1976) is a Kuwaiti-born Canadian banking executive. She was educated at Saint Mary's University and The American University in Cairo and had a 26-year career with Scotiabank before her appointment to Laurentian Bank in October 2020.

After attending SMU, Lleweyen would go on to bank in Ireland.

== Early life and education ==
Llewellyn was born in 1976 in Kuwait to an Egyptian father and a Jordanian mother. She grew up in Kuwait and Egypt but immigrated to Canada in 1992 after the Gulf War.

Before immigrating to Canada, she had studied for two years at The American University in Cairo (1990-1992). She then attended Saint Mary's University in Halifax Nova Scotia, from 1992 to 1996, graduating with a Bachelor of Commerce in Finance and an MBA in Marketing and International Business. In 2014 Llewellyn was awarded an honorary Doctorate of Commerce from Saint Mary's University.

== Career ==
Llewellyn had a 26-year career at Scotiabank, beginning as a part-time teller.

She served in a series of progressive roles with Scotiabank including: Vice President, Multicultural Banking; President & CEO of Roynat Capital; Senior Vice President, Commercial Banking, Growth Strategy; Senior Vice President, Products and Services, Global Transaction Banking and ultimately Executive Vice President, Global Business Payments. In 2019 she was awarded the Women in Payments Award for Thought Leader from The Global Association of Women in Payments for her outstanding work in modernizing the Canadian payments industry.

While working for Scotiabank, she championed the creation of The Toronto Region Immigrant Employment Council (TRIEC) to help tackle the problem of immigrant underemployment.

In October 2020, Laurentian Bank announced that she would replace acting CEO Stephane Therrien who had been serving as president and chief executive since Francois Desjardins retired in June 2020.

On October 2, 2023, after a weeklong mainframe outage which affected customer operations, Laurentian Bank announced her resignation effective immediately. She has been succeeded by Éric Provost.

== Personal life ==
She has two children with her husband, Sean Llewellyn.
