= Thierry Pauchant =

Canadian ethicist

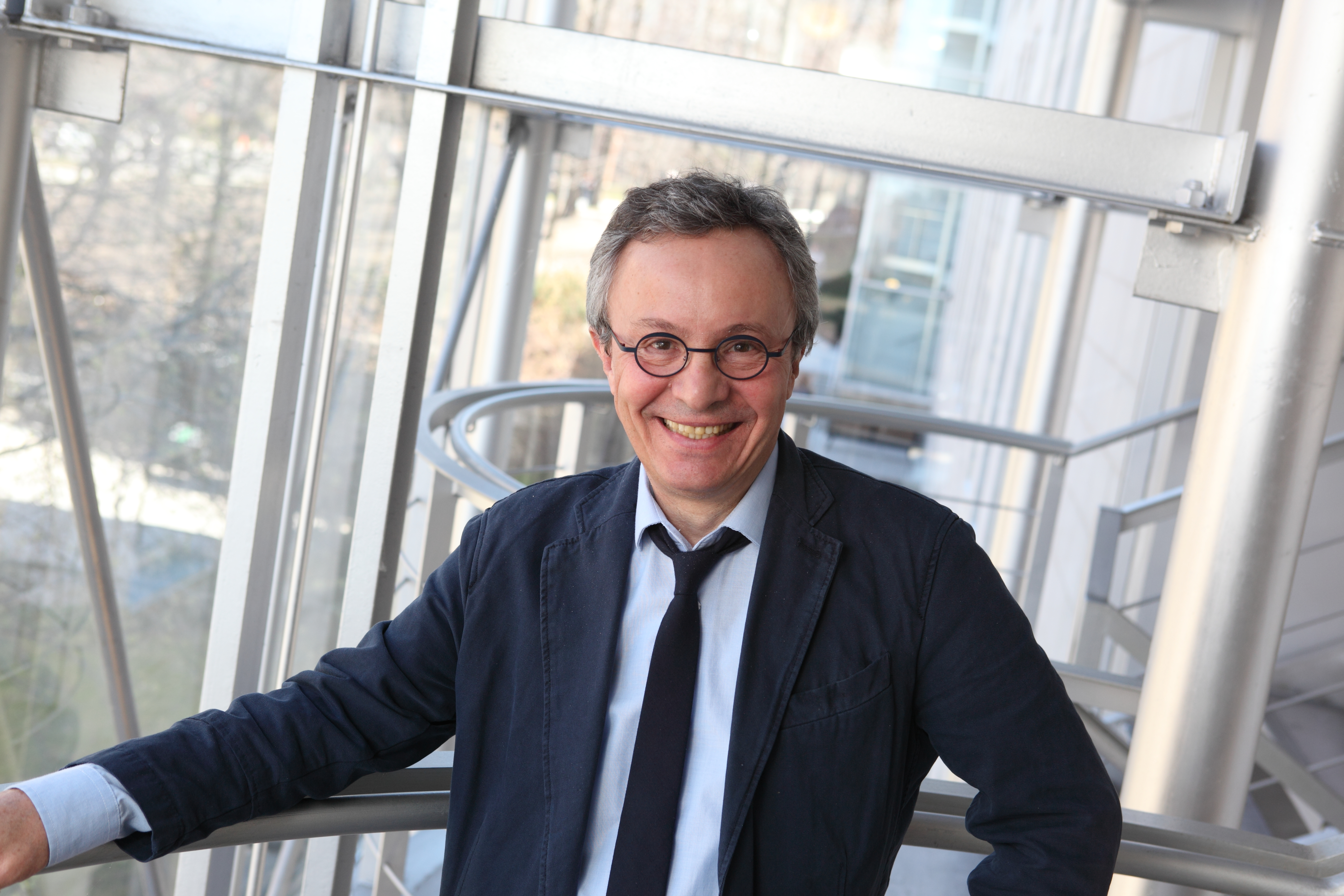
- Thierry C. Pauchant in May 2015
- Born: December 31, 1954; Roubaix, France
- Education: University of Southern California (USC)
- Known for: Crisis and Risks Ethics Management; Crisis Management
- Scientific career
- Fields: Ethics; Administrative Board Ethics; Organisational Leadership
- Workplaces: University of Southern California; University of California at Los Angeles; HEC Montreal

Thierry Pauchant is a professor at École des hautes études commerciales de Montréal, where he founded the Ethics Management Chair.

== Biography ==
Born in France in 1954, Pauchant is Ethics Management Chair Director at HEC Montréal, where he began his studies. He completed his PhD in California. In 1987, he moved to Quebec, where in 1991 he became a Canadian citizen. He currently teaches professional programs (DESG, MBA) and research programs (M.Sc. and PhD) at HEC Montreal, where he founded the Ethics Management Chair, which is the first chair of its kind in a French-speaking business school.

Pauchant initially held management positions in the tourism industry, then became a consultant, trainer and researcher for organisations in Canada, France and the United States, including AT&T, CGI, Holiday Inns, IBM, the Government of Quebec, and General Electric. He holds a professorship at HEC Montreal and was an associate professor at the Fielding Graduate University in Santa Barbara, California. He received a Bachelor in Administration from the University of Grenoble, a master's degree in urban landscaping at the Pantheon-Sorbonne University, an MBA in organisational development from University of California, Los Angeles and a PhD in strategic change and the systemic thought process from the University of Southern California.

He has co-founded five organisations where he occupies executive positions, including the HEC Montreal Ethics Management Chair and the Ethics committee for research. He is also on the board of directors of the FondAction CSN Pour la coopération et l'emploi.

== Work ==
Pauchant's work on the ethical management of crisis and risk has been aimed at governments, industry and scientists worldwide. He has appeared on the cover of the magazine Les Affaire Plus. The Government of Quebec tasked him to evaluate their major crisis management system. He has been awarded for his teaching skills at University HEC Montreal.

His publications on business ethics include 36 façon d'être éthique au travail, which discusses ways to combine ethics with performance and profit, and has been nominated for a Governor’s Business Book Award.

In media interviews and conferences, he has urged for greater popularity for science, and for financial and consulting companies to do more to avoid corruption.

Pauchant is currently researching moral considerations in economical exchanges and the ethical audit of organisations, by means of a detailed questionnaire created with colleagues and associates.

== Publications ==
Partial list of book publications:

- Pauchant, T.C. (2015). Liberté, équité et écologie en économie politique. Condorcet, Adam Smith et le projet inachevé des lumières. Paris : Fayard (Livre en préparation).
- Fontaine, L. et T.C. Pauchant (2009). 36 façons d’être éthique au travail, Montréal, Québec : Fides et Presses HEC Montréal, 257 p.
- Pauchant, T.C. et al. (Ed.). (2002). Ethics and Spirituality at Work: Hopes and Pitfalls of the Search for Meaning in Organizations, New York: Quorum Books, 266 p.
- Pauchant, T.C. et al. (2002). Guérir la santé. Un dialogue de groupe sur le sens du travail, les valeurs et l’éthique dans le réseau de la santé. Montréal : Éditions Fides, Presses HEC, 396 p.
- Pauchant, T.C. et al. (2000). Pour un management éthique et spirituel. Défis, cas, outils, questions, Éditions Fides, Presses HEC, 420 p.

Recent articles

- Pauchant, T.C. (2015). The False Ethics of the Market's Invisible Hand. Adam Smith's Three Warnings (In review, Business Ethics Quarterly).
- Pauchant, T., F. Elliott, E. Franco, V. Lecourt, Y. Leunens et J. Martineau (2015). Corruption, collusion et éthique : Comment contrer une culture de désengagement moral ? (Sous évaluation, Éthique Publique).
- Martineau, J. and T. Pauchant (2015). Increasing the Variety of Business Practices: A New Research Agenda. (In review, Organizational Dynamics).
- Pauchant, T.C. (2015). Adam Smith Socio-Cultural Theory of Evolution. New Insights from his 1749 Lecture. The Adam Smith Review (Sous presse).
- Guntzburger, Y., V. Lecourt et T.C. Pauchant (2014). Le dialogue au service du changement, de l'apprentissage et de l'éthique en organisation. Revue Internationale de Gestion (Sous presse).
- Pauchant, T. et E. Franco (2014). Adam Smith au-delà de sa caricature néo-libérale. Suggestions règlementaires et éthiques pour la banque, la finance et l'économie. Éthique Publique (Sous presse)
- Guntzburger, Y. and T.C. Pauchant (2014). Complexity and Ethical Crisis Management. A Systemic Analysis of the Fukushima Daiichi Nuclear Disaster. Journal of Organizational Effectiveness (Sous presse).
- Pauchant, T.C. and Elisabeth A. Franco(2014)."Adam Smith au-delà de sa caricature néolibérale : suggestions réglementaires et éthiques pour la banque, la finance et l’économie". vol. 16, n° 2. Éthique et reconfigurations de l’économie de marché : nouvelles alternatives, nouveaux enjeux (http://ethiquepublique.revues.org/1528)

Pauchant has also been published in Kosmos: Journal for global transformation and Lead.
