= Caroline Codsi =

Canadian businesswoman

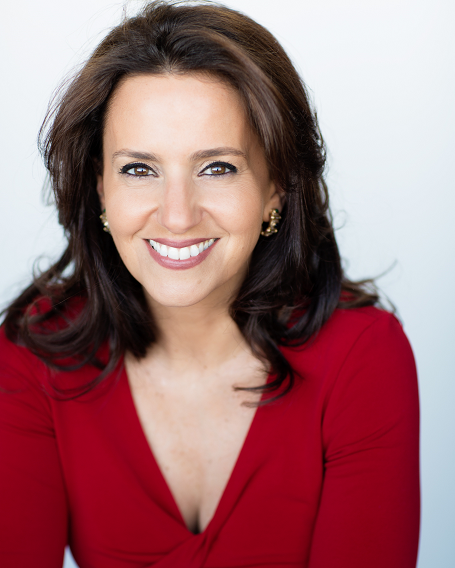
- Codsi in 2015
- Born: Beirut
- Education: University of Paris, HEC Montreal,
- Occupation: Founder
- Years active: 1992 - present
- Organization: Women in Governance (La Gouvernance au Feminin)
- Website: womeningovernance.org

Caroline Codsi (Arabic: كارولين قدسي) is a Canadian businesswoman who is the president and founder of a non-profit organization Women in Governance, created in 2010 to help women access decision-making roles. She is also a board member of Montreal Museum of Fine Arts and Alexa Translations, and has spoken at TEDxMontrealWomen.

== Education ==
Codsi was born in Beirut, and moved to Paris at age 17, where she received her high school diploma in 1986 from Lycée et collège Victor-Duruy. She continued her studies at the University of Paris, and graduated in 1990 with a diploma in Foreign Languages and Civilizations.

In 1991, Codsi moved to Montreal to study at HEC Montréal, the graduate business school of the Université de Montréal. She graduated in 1994 with a degree in Human Resources. In 2013-14, Codsi was awarded a grant to study the Directors Education Program for Governance and received her ICD.D designation (from the Institute of Corporate Directors) at McGill University.

== Career ==
Codsi spent the majority of her career in Human Resources, Employee Assistance, Human Capital and Health Services.

Programs of the Women in Governance organization support gender parity in Canada via advocacy, educational events, mentoring, etc. In cooperation with the McKinsey & Company they developed the Parity Certification which is available in Canada and United States.

== Awards ==
- Top 20 Diversity Leading Figure in Quebec
- Top 75 Canadian Immigrant
- Top 100 Most Powerful Women in Canada
- Gender Equality Award by the United Nations Women's Committee and by New Delhi's Women's Economic Forum
