= Gianmaria Potenza =

Italian artist (born 1936)

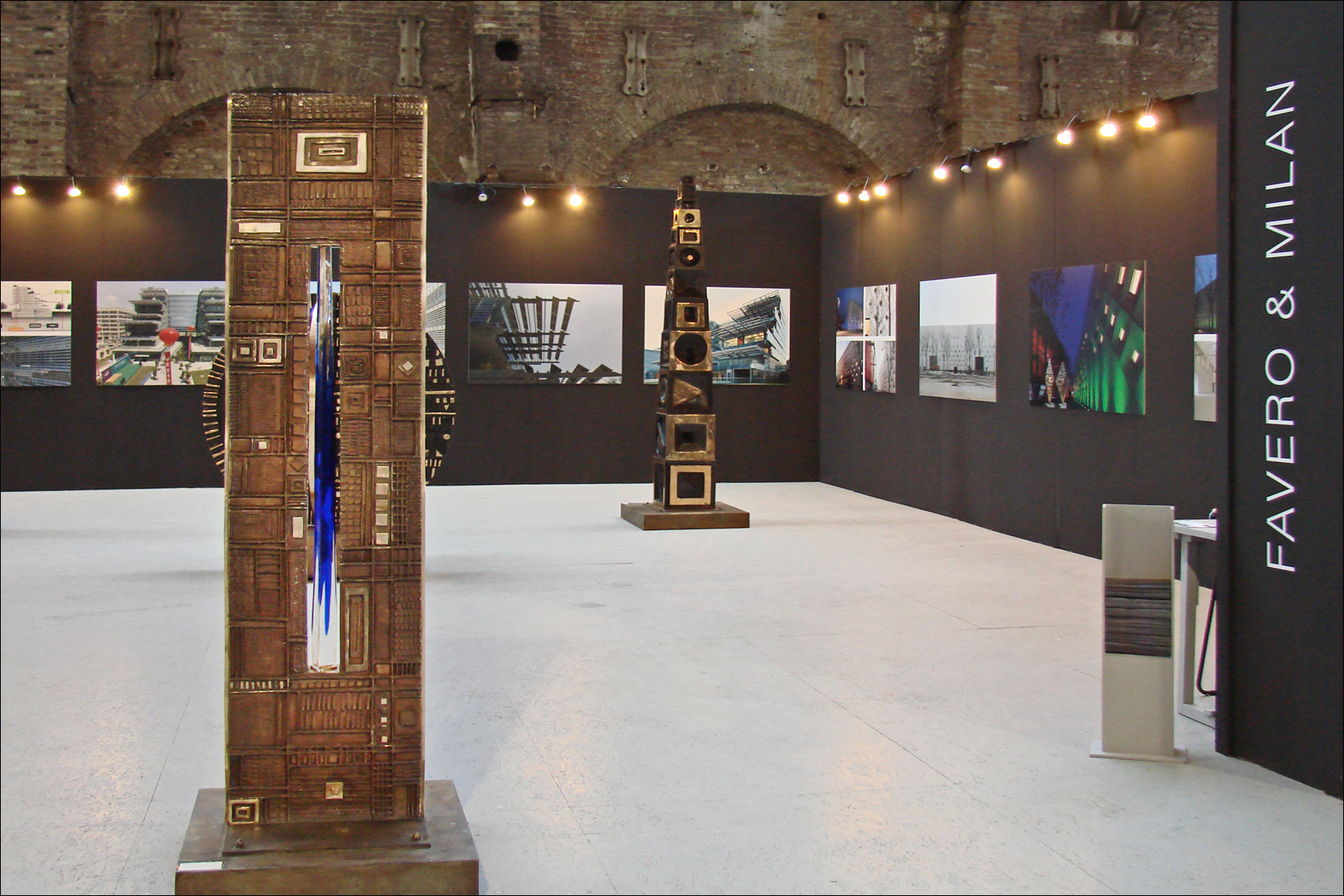
- Born: December 9, 1936 (age 89); Venice,
- Known for: Painting, Sculpture
- Website: www.gianmariapotenza.com

Gianmaria Potenza (born December 9, 1936) is an Italian artist born in Venice living and working in Venice, Italy.

== Debuts ==
Gianmaria Potenza was born in Venice on December 9, 1936, son of Filomena Pettenello and Giuseppe Potenza, third of five children. At the time, the Potenza family owned from five generations a company of decorations and stucco work for Venetian palaces, then specialized in the last decades of activity in works for large ships. First influences certainly come from the environment of craftsmanship and professions where Gianmaria Potenza grows. Two figures, in particular, we could say, make him a "son of art": Uncle Primo Potenza, talented painter, best known as a portrait painter and his uncle Ennio Pettenello, skillful sculptor who teaches young Potenza to work the clay and allows the nephew to practice in his studio. Helping his uncles, Gianmaria Potenza discovers at a very young age his passion for sculpture and modeling of materials.

In 1947 he enrolled at the Art Institute of Venice, finishing his studies in 1956. At the Institute of Art Potenza studies under the enlightened guidance of Giorgio Wenter Marini, who immediately recognizes the young student's talent and encourages his artistic career. At only the age of 16 Potenza officially makes his first public debut, taking part in a collective exhibition at the Fondazione Bevilacqua La Masa, where he also held his first solo exhibit in 1958. As the best student of the Institute, he was invited to exhibit his works at the world renowned Venice Biennale in 1954 and 1956, and thereafter in 1958, 1960, 1966, 1968, 1986, 1995 and 2009.

Thanks to the support of his parents, still a student, Gianmaria Potenza opens his studio in a small room that, from 1964, will then be expanded in the current Potenza Studio spaces. From the very beginning, Potenza practices different forms of art: from graffiti to painting on wood and velvet, from engraving on glass to that of concrete and metal. Together with his friend Sandro Pianon, soon he gets the first commissions for the decoration of large panels for clothing, umbrellas and lace stores. In the late 1950s Potenza knows Eng. Ivone Grassetto, owner of one of the biggest Italian construction companies. This knowledge represents an important turning point for the artist's career. Eng. Grassetto, in fact, commissions several works for his company and gives him the opportunity to have many other commissions, including for the Automobil Club in Padua, Banco di Roma and the Aga Khan. Thanks to Grassetto, in 1962 Potenza receives an important work for the Lepetit, a big pharmaceutical company, who commissions a series of large painted panels for the Milan offices. The career of the young Potenza is well underway. Even the artist's private life sees important news. In 1960 he married Rossana Marchesi, who he had two children with: Sebastiano (1962) and Matilde (1965).

Potenza’s work reveals an intrinsic connection with disciplines related to artistic practice. Working within an interdisciplinary framework, he developed a modus operandi that reflected a strong sensitivity to architecture and design. Throughout his career, Potenza collaborated with internationally recognized architects including Gio Ponti, Pier Luigi Nervi, Franco Albini, Andrea Busiri Vici, Luigi Vietti, and Jacques Couelle. Through these collaborations, Potenza developed a method that became a constant feature of his artistic practice: from the study of drawings to execution, the creative process followed a parallel and collaborative relationship with the architect.

A dialogue with architecture is also evident on a formal level. From the outset, his work demonstrated a tendency toward three-dimensionality, even when working on flat surfaces. He developed an artistic process that moved from flat surfaces toward bas-relief and embossed effects, carving and shaping materials to create tactile movement. Through combinations of materials and contrasts of light and shadow, as well as protruding and recessed forms, he produced dynamic surface effects.

== Works on commission ==
One of his main clients is from the beginning the Banco di Roma. Many branches in major Italian cities - Rome, Milan, Turin, Florence, Venice, to name a few - are adorned with his large decorative panels. Potenza's works, destined to the most important bank environments, from the auditorium hall to the meeting room to the office of the director, are a true story of the traditions, symbols and most representative places of the cities that host them. In later years, he also works for the decoration of the Banco di Roma premises in Paris and London (1974), New York (1980) and San Francisco (1981) and for the Cassa di Risparmio in Monselice (1965), Rovigo (1970) and Padua (1978). Gianmaria Potenza is also greatly appreciated by Banca Antonveneta, who in 1995 purchased the entire series of "Tarocchi", "Elaboratore n.66" and "Il Veliero", still exhibited in Padua.

Since the early Sixties, Potenza also takes an interest in the studio of advertising lines for various industries and commercial chains and dedicates himself to the study, at the express request of the Holy See, of vestments and sacred furnishings. In 1967 he made for Pope Paul VI a series of silver chalices and a velvet chasuble, today exposed in the Vatican Museums. Among his most illustrative sacred works of this decade are to be considered the glass Via Crucis cycle and the vestments for the church of Santa Cecilia in Milan along with large glass cross for the church of San Giovanni Crisostomo in Milan. Even today sacred art is an important part of the Gianmaria Potenza artistic production. His works are present in many Italian churches, including the most recent vestments for the parish church of Maria Immacolata Pedara (2015) and the Cross for the Church of Santa Maria Capitana del Mar in Jesolo (2015).

Since the early 1970s, Potenza began to work for the interior decoration of the most famous Italian turbine-powered ship: Raffaello (1970), Marconi (1971), Ausonia (1974), Michelangelo (1975-1976). His works are located in the ships of S. Domino and Palladio of the Adriatica Navigazione (1988–89) until the great commissions of the Nineties and 2000s for the Holland American Line, Carnival Cruise Line, Princess Cruises, Costa Cruises and P&O. The collaborations with the large shipping companies is one of the most important chapters in Gianmaria Potenza's career, for the vastness and quantity of work that has been commissioned for over three decades, from wood panels to tapestries for the Italia Società di Navigazione during the Eighties, up to the walls decorated with mosaics and monumental bronze sculptures for the great transatlantic in the Nineties and 2000s. Taking advantage of the spatial layout of ships, Potenza creates architectural sculptures that can influence how the environments are used and lived. Whether inside or outside matters little, the same will continue to speak, support, play.

In the decoration of hotels, public buildings, private houses and ships, Potenza tries to graft on a modern expression making use of specific materials and techniques, the large craft and Venetian decorative tradition with its inventive force and its symbolic openings.

== La Murrina ==
In 1968, together with Ulderico Moretti, a factory specialized in industrial glass, Potenza founds "la murrina" glassware, designing objects and lighting and furniture items. In 1975, taken from his artistic career, Potenza surrenders the activity. But in such a limited time, however, he is able to impress its stylistic figure in the production of glassware, combining the Murano glass art tradition with design. The products of La Murrina are different, new, recognizable by all the others and are distinguished immediately for the strong innovation brought to the Murano landscape.

== Major exhibitions ==
The 1980s represent a new stage in his artistic production. He made his first bronze sculptures and showed artistic maturity with pitto-sculptures, reaching expressive autonomy and an unmistakable language. In the early 1990s, Licata defines Potenza as "revolutionary" for having completely reinterpreted the mosaic technique. In fact, Potenza makes an entirely individual use of the technique: the arrangement of the tiles is no longer flat but crosswise. All this makes the mosaic closer to sculpture rather than to painting.

Numerous exhibitions in major cities consecrate him among the greats of contemporary Italian art. In 1986 he exhibited at the 42nd Venice Biennale the floating sculpture "Ninfea Armonica", a large 7 meters diameter flower placed in front of the "Giardini". Real "total work", capable of combining painting, sculpture, scenography and sound, the "Ninfea Armonica" offers the artist a good showcase on the world. His fame goes behind the national boundaries. In 1995 he exhibited at the Museum of Turkish and Islamic Art in Istanbul. In the exhibition "Dialogue between traditions", celebrating the strong link between Istanbul and Venice, Gianmaria Potenza's art represents an important contemporary expression of reinterpretation of Venetian traditions. The exhibition also marks the beginning of major international exhibitions, from Hong Kong, Sharjah (United Arab Emirates), New York, Lithuania to Vilnius and Kaunas, and then Russia to Samara, Krasnodar, Rostov, and St. Petersburg. In Russia, especially, Potenza's art is extraordinarily appreciated, so that in 2013 the Museum of Contemporary Art of St. Petersburg ERARTA, defining Potenza as "the new Canova", decides to erect the sculpture "World in Cross" as a symbol of the Museum, placing it in front of the main entrance.

Over the last two decades, other acknowledgments have come from small and large private and public commissions. Having reached an international audience and enthusiastic reviews from the press and critics, Potenza has had many works placed in the squares of many Italian cities and in the venues of public institutions, including the bronze fountain for the square of Cavallino Treporti, Venice (2008) and the bronze sculpture for the Barracks of the Guardia di Finanza, Venice (2011). In 2005, due to a private donation, the mosaic "Sun" was placed in the Aventura City Hall in Florida, where it is still exposed. In 2012, a large mosaic was placed in the refectory of the Monastery of Bose, where every year an important international liturgical symposia of sacred art and architecture is held.

Today Gianmaria Potenza is in full production phase. He works in a historic atelier in Venice, in the area of San Trovaso, where he continues to create new forms of art, adopting new techniques and materials. He regularly exhibits in the main fairs of national and international art, in addition to numerous exhibitions in Italy and abroad that each year pay tribute to his art.

== Exhibitions ==
- 1954 presence Biennale d'Arte di Venezia
- 1956 presence Biennale d'Arte di Venezia
- 1958 Solo Exhibitions presso la Fondazione Bevilacqua La Masa di Venezia
- 1960 presence Biennale d'Arte di Venezia
- 1966 presence Biennale d'Arte di Venezia
- 1968 presence Biennale d'Arte di Venezia
- 1986 presence Biennale d'Arte di Venezia
- 1995 presence Biennale d'Arte di Venezia
- 2009 presence Biennale d'Arte di Venezia
- 2009 Arte Padova 2009 "Arca Potenza"
- 2010 Arte Genova 2010
- 2010 il Museo Internazionale delle Ceramiche in Faenza
- 2014 Solo Exhibitions"VENETIAN RHYTHMS" M. Žilinskas Art Gallery Kaunas
- 2016 Solo Exhibitions at the Tenuta Venissa di Mazzorbo.
- 2017 Solo Exhibition al Palazzo Ducale di Venezia curated by Laura Villani
- 2018 Solo Exhibition alla Accademia di Belle Arti di Firenze

== Bibliography ==
- Gianmaria Potenza Alfabeti Sconosciuti e Linguaggi Simbolici / A cura di Laura Villani. Editoriale Giorgio Mondadori, 2018
- Arte in, Volume 5, Edizioni 19-21 Editore Calcagni 1992
- Gianmaria Potenza : sculture in movimento : bronzi / A cura di! Luca Massimo Barbero. - Venezia : Art Editions, 1999. - 63 p
- Gianmaria Potenza: sculture, pittosculture, arazzi, mosaici; Castello di Poppi, 23 marzo - 30 giugno 2002 Collaboratore Poppi Editore I.N.K. Gruppo Editoriale, 2002
- Storia dell'arte italiana del '900: Generazione anni Trenta di Giorgio Di Genova Edizioni Bora 2000
