= Jean-Marie Girier =

French civil servant (born 1984)

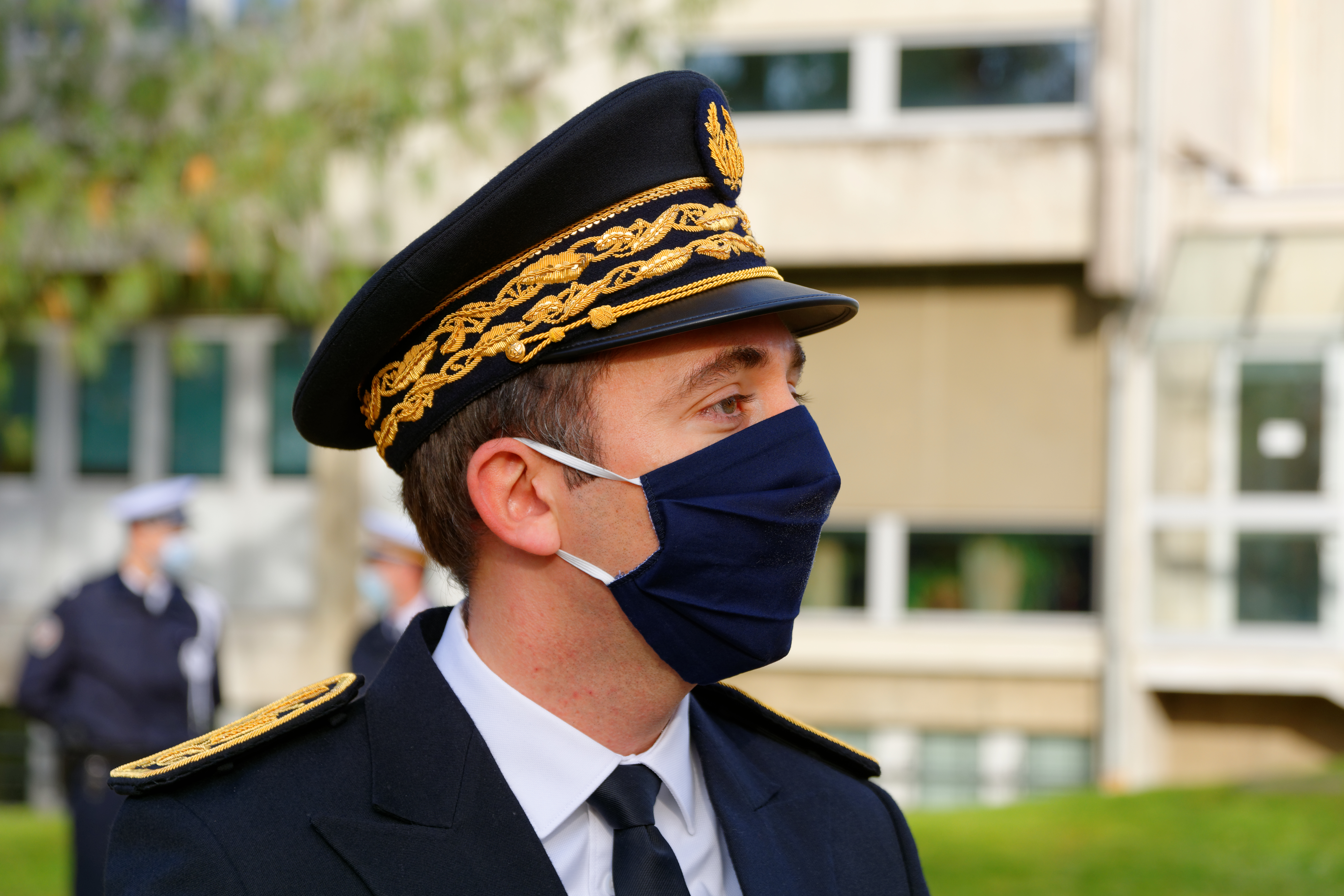
- Girier in 2020

Prefect of Pyrénées-Atlantiques
- Incumbent
- Assumed office 6 November 2024
- Preceded by: Julien Charles

Personal details
- Born: 11 July 1984 (age 41)

Jean-Marie Girier (born 11 July 1984) is a French civil servant who has been serving as prefect of Pyrénées-Atlantiques since 2024. From 2022 to 2024, he served as prefect of Vienne. From 2020 to 2022, he served as prefect of the Territoire de Belfort. During the 2020 Paris municipal election, he served as campaign manager for Agnès Buzyn. From 2018 to 2020, he served as chief of staff to National Assembly president Richard Ferrand. From 2017 to 2018, he served as chief of staff to interior minister Gérard Collomb. During the 2017 presidential election, he served as campaign manager for Emmanuel Macron.
