= SS Jean Marie =

Jean Marie was the name of a number of steamships, including:

- SS Jean Marie (1922), a Belgian cargo ship in service 1947–51
- SS Jean Marie (1939), a Belgian cargo ship in service 1956–62
