= Gilbert Laporte =

Professor of operations research

- Spouse: Ann Langley (m. 1974)
- Children: 1

Academic background
- Education: BSc., McGill University; M.A., Operations Research, 1972, University of Lancaster; PhD., London School of Economics
- Thesis: (1975)

Gilbert Laporte CM is a full professor of operations research at HEC Montréal. He holds the Canada Research Chair in Distribution Management. Laporte has been awarded the Order of Canada and the Innis-Gérin Medal.

== Education ==
Laporte earned a bachelor's in mathematics from McGill University and a master's degree from Lancaster University. He moved to London with his wife to pursue a PhD from the London School of Economics in operational research.

== Career ==
Upon earning his PhD, Laporte joined the Computer Science Department at the Université de Montréal as a research assistant. In 1976, he was appointed assistant professor at HEC Montréal. Four years later he was promoted to associate professor and eventually to full professor in 1986. In the 1990s, he was the recipient of the 1994 Award of Merit from the Canadian Operational Research Society and the 1999 Jacques-Rousseau Prize for Interdisciplinarity from the Association canadienne-française pour l'avancement des sciences (Acfas). In 2001, he was named in the inaugural Canada Research Chair in Distribution Management and was awarded the Grand Prize for Teaching Excellence by HEC Montréal. As he continued in academia, Laporte continued to be recognized for his contributions in the field of operations research and quantitative methods. In 2004, Laporte received the Glover-Klingman Award and TSL Best Paper Award from the Institute for Operations Research and the Management Sciences. The next year, Laporte was named a Fellow of the Institute for Operations Research and the Management Sciences.

In 2007, Laporte was the recipient of the Innis-Gérin Medal from the Royal Society of Canada for his sustained contribution to the literature of the social sciences. The 2008–09 academic year was proven to be successful for Laporte. In April, Laporte was the recipient of the Gérard-Parizeau Award. In June, Laporte was named an honorary member of the Omega Rho Honor Society from the Institute for Operations Research and the Management Sciences.

In 2012, Laporte was named the third most influential researcher in the field of management in Canada by the Hirsch-Index Benchmarking of Academic Research. He tied with Danny Miller for the Pierre Laurin Award. At the conclusion of the 2013–14 Academic term, Laporte received the international honour of the Lifetime Achievement in Location Analysis from the Institute for Operations Research and the Management Sciences. Laporte took sabbatical leave from HEC from June 1 to December 31, 2015, and again from June 1, 2016, to December 31, 2016. Prior to announcing his sabbatical, Laporte renewed his Canada Research Chair. Upon his return, Laporte's academic achievements were recognized by the Eindhoven University of Technology with an honorary doctorate on April 22, 2016.

By 2017, Laporte was credited with being the "world's most productive and influential author in operations research and management science" by Omega – The International Journal of Management Science. During that academic year, he was the recipient of the 2017 Prix d'excellence FRQNT and the Urgel-Archambault award in physics, mathematics, computer science and engineering. Laporte became the first HEC Montréal professor to ever receive this distinction. The following year, he was awarded an honorary doctorate from the University of Liège and received the 2018 Marie-Victorin award from the Quebec government. In December 2018, Laporte was honoured with the Order of Canada.

In 2019, Laporte received many accolades for his research. Such as, being elected a member of the National Academy of Engineering. His research continued to advance and he was eventually awarded the Best Paper Award from the Production & Operations Management Society. By April, Laporte had been recognized as one of the world's most productive and influential authors in the fields of computer science and electronics based on the Google Scholar index. In June 2019, Laporte became only the third researcher to become a fellow of the Vehicle Routing and Logistics Optimization. He also serves as an associate editor for the Journal of the Operational Research Society.

In 2021, he was awarded the honorary degree of Doctor Honoris Causa at the Norwegian University of Science and Technology (NTNU). He was also awarded the 2021 Killam Prize in Engineering

== Personal life ==
Laporte married full professor Ann Langley on August 3, 1974. Their daughter is an assistant professor at École de Technologie Supérieure.

== Selected publications ==
- The vehicle routing problem: An overview of exact and approximate algorithms
- A tabu search heuristic for the vehicle routing problem
- A unified tabu search heuristic for vehicle routing problems with time windows
- Classical and modern heuristics for the vehicle routing problem
