= Jean-Marie Peretti =

Jean-Marie Peretti (born 1946) (also known as Jean-Marc Peretti) is a French organizational theorist, Professor at the ESSEC business school and at the University of Corsica Pasquale Paoli, management consultant and author, known for his work on human resources management.

Peretti graduated from ESSEC in 1967 and received his PhD in Management at the Institute of Political Studies in Paris in 1969. After his graduation, Peretti has been working as a management consultant. He was president of the Institut International de l'Audit Social from 1991 to 2000, and President of the French Association of Human Resource Management from 2001 to 2004.

== Books ==
Recent ones, in French

- Tous différents, gérer la diversité dans l'entreprise ouvrage collectif coordonné par JM Peretti, 2006, Éditions de l'Organisation ISBN 2-7081-3759-X
- Ressources humaines, 2006, Vuibert, ISBN 2-7117-7558-5
- Tous DRH, 2006, éditions de l'Organisation, ISBN 2-7081-3631-3
- FAQ ressources humaines - Tout ce que vous souhaitez savoir, 2006, ed. Fonctions de l'entreprise ISBN 2-10-049128-8
- Dictionnaire des ressources humaines, 2005, Vuibert, ISBN 2-7117-7832-0
- Tous reconnus, 2005, Éditions de l'Organisation, ISBN 2-7081-3383-7
- Les clés de l'équité dans l'entreprise, 2005, Forum international du management, ISBN 2-7081-3057-9
