= Orquesta Filarmónica del Estado de Querétaro =

Philharmonic orchestra in Querétaro, Mexico

The Orquesta Filarmónica del Estado de Querétaro (English: Querétaro Philharmonic Orchestra) is a philharmonic orchestra based in the Mexican state of Querétaro. It was formed in 1992.

The orchestra is composed of about 60 to 70 musicians, and is conducted by the Ukrainian Mark Kadin. The majority of their performances are held in the Teatro de la República.
