= Jean-Marie Toulouse =

Jean-Marie Toulouse CM OQ FRSC
- Born: 1942 (age 82–83); Beauceville, Quebec, Canada
- Awards: National Order of Quebec

Jean-Marie Toulouse, CM OQ FRSC (born 1942) is a Canadian academic.

He is a Professor and Director of the École des Hautes Études Commerciales in Montreal.

In 2004, he was made an Officer (Officier) of the National Order of Quebec. In 1997, he was made a Fellow of the Royal Society of Canada.
