= Jean-Marie Delwart =

Belgian businessman

Jean-Marie Delwart is a Belgian businessman.

== Career ==
He is Chairman of Belgocodex S.A., Chairman of Biotec S.A., Chairman of Hoccinvest S.A., and he is a member of the Belgian business club Cercle de Lorraine.

== Foundation ==
He founded the Jean-Marie Delwart Foundation, which rewards original research in Chemical Communication and in Ethology/Cultural Anthropology.

== Jean-Marie Delwart Foundation ==
The Jean-Marie Delwart Foundation awards a prize for an original work or series of works, individual or collective, in a field chosen for each edition. The prize for 2010 was for Comparative and Evolutionary Neurosciences, was worth US$10,000, and was open to works written or translated in French or English, with applicants either applying themselves or nominated by a specialist or academic institution. The jury is made up of members of the foundation's scientific committee and of the Académie Royale des Sciences de Belgique, and the prize is presented at the Académie's public session in December. The foundation's contact address is care of Biotec s.a., the company of which Delwart is chairman.

== Sources ==
- Floridienne
- Foundation Jean-Marie Delwart
