= Jean-Marie Mokole =

Jean-Marie Mokole is a member of the Pan-African Parliament from the Central African Republic. Makole became the rapporteur for Rural Economy, Agriculture, Natural Resources and Environment in 2009.
