= B2B Bank =

Canadian bank

- Industry: Financial Service
- Headquarters: Toronto, Canada
- Key people: Rania Llewelyn; President & CEO
- Revenue: $915 million CAD (2016)
- Owner: Fairstone Bank of Canada
- Number of employees: 896 (2016)
- Website: b2bbank.com

B2B Bank is a Canadian bank that operates as a wholly owned subsidiary of Fairstone Bank of Canada.

== Operations ==
B2B Bank offers investment and Registered Retirement Savings Plan loans, broker deposits, broker mortgages, and investment and banking accounts to a network of 27,000 financial professionals including: financial advisors and their dealerships; deposit and mortgage brokers and their firms; mutual fund and insurance manufacturers; MFDA and IIROC members.

== History ==
B2B Bank was a wholly owned subsidiary of Laurentian Bank of Canada from its founding. In 1996, Laurentian Bank acquired the personal and commercial client portfolios of North American Trust, subsequently organizing these assets into a division known as Agency Banking. Four years later, Laurentian purchased Sun Life Trust Company and merged the business with the Agency Banking division. On July 1, 2000, the resulting organization was renamed B2B Trust. On July 7, 2012, the company became a Schedule I bank and was renamed B2B Bank. B2B Bank's head office is located in Toronto's financial district.

After the split-sale of Laurentian Bank of Canada concluded on November 1, 2026, B2B Bank became a wholly owned subsidiary of Fairstone Bank of Canada.

== Membership ==
B2B Bank is a member of the Canada Deposit Insurance Corporation (CDIC).

It is also part of THE EXCHANGE Network owned by Ficanex.
