= Integration of immigrants =

Socioeconomic integration into society

The integration of immigrants, or migrant integration, is primarily the process of socioeconomic integration of immigrants and their descendants into a society through emancipatory and collective care values of the host country. Secondarily, it involves the gradual access to equal opportunities with other residents in terms of community duties and political participation. Central aspects of socioeconomic integration include overcoming barriers related to language, education, labour market participation, and identification with social values and the host country. The topic covers both the individual affairs of immigrants in their everyday lives and the socio-cultural phenomena of the host society.

== Typologies ==
Social discourse about the integration of immigrants has often not only been about immigrants themselves (first-generation migrants, "foreigner integration" in the narrower sense), but also about the integration of the future generation(s), who are usually already naturalized or born as citizens, the "integration of people with a migration background" or "with an immigration history". Special cases of group-specific integration include the integration of linguistic, cultural or ethnic minorities who immigrated a long time ago. In Countries with official multiculturalism policies like Canada, integration may also involve navigating through racialized and gendered expectations which shape the experiences of first generation immigrants and their children. Here, one speaks of the integration of minorities, which overlaps with the integration of autochthonous (native) minorities. When it comes to labour migration, one also speaks of the integration of foreign workers, particularly those who decide to stay in the country of employment, as occurred in Europe, for example, in the guest workers in Germany issue of the mid-20th century.

A special case is the "integration of refugees", particularly in the case of a large refugee crisis. For refugees who are classified as refugees under the Geneva Refugee Convention, the situation in the respective host country is different in that migrants in general have certain obligations under international law which the host country must comply with, with regard to the integration of refugees. In the course of the 2015 European migrant crisis, the debate about immigration, refugee and asylum policy, the integration of refugees and migrants in general and the prospect of staying for people with unclear or temporary residency rights have become more of a focus of public attention.

Some countries that traditionally consider themselves as an immigration country have long controlled immigration in a targeted and needs-oriented manner, for example with a points-based immigration system, to regulate and promote cultural and economic integration.

== Historical development ==
Historically, migrations affecting larger groups have either led to the development of ethnic minorities in the host countries (segregation, ghettoisation) if certain basic socio-cultural factors such as mother tongue, religious affiliation or customs and traditions have been retained; in this case, ethnographic and demographic differences can persist for many generations, sometimes with permanent or at least temporarily inadequate integration into the overall social structure, even leading to problems of oppression and persecution even after centuries of residence. In other cases, the descendants of migrants assimilate into the cultural makeup of a society by giving up their peculiarities until the only traces of their origins are highly stable identity features such as a "foreign" surname. In the case of complete assimilation, the name of origin is often changed as well. This can take the form of adopting a new name typical of the country or a less "foreign" seeming variant of the original name. Furthermore, it is also possible that migrants and members of (originally) established minorities partially retain characteristics of their culture of origin, but also adopt elements of the culture of the host country.

John W. Berry uses the term integration as a contrast to the terms assimilation, segregation and marginalization.

== Definition of integration ==
There is no clear definition of the term integration in science. In the context of migration, "integration" is usually understood to mean social integration, which is usually considered in several dimensions.

Integration has been defined as the process of immigrant and native born populations changing to resemble one another as a result of the influx of people into a particular territory.

The integration of individuals (both the integration of immigrants and of linguistic-cultural or ethnic minorities as well as the integration of other population groups, such as people with disabilities or people with a particular sexual orientation) is expressed in forms of social integration, i.e. the integration of individual actors into an existing system. The opposite of integration is social exclusion, also known as segregation in a group context. This is also called social integration (integration into society).

In contrast to social integration, the social sciences speak of system integration (integration of society) when it concerns the cohesion of a social system as a whole, for example the cohesion of society as a whole. The opposite of (system) integration is called desintegration; in the context of migration, there is talk of ghettoization or a division of society into parallel societies.

=== Four dimensions of integration ===
Integration has many aspects that are usually presented as dimensions. Hartmut Esser, like Friedrich Heckmann, distinguishes four dimensions:

- cultural integration, including language acquisition and other knowledge and skills;
- structural integration, particularly participation in education and the labour market;
- social integration, through social relationships and participation in everyday life; and
- identity integration, involving a personal sense of belonging to the host society.

However, such a rigid division into different aspects of integration that must be considered separately is not empirically supported, and several attempts have been made to redefine phases of integration.

==== Cultural integration ====
Cultural integration occurs through the acquisition of skills that are necessary for communication and action in the host society. Values, norms, the legal system and attitudes of the host society are learned and internalized. This includes language acquisition in particular. The formation of ethnic minority cultures would be the opposite of cultural integration. Divergent values can arise particularly in the areas of religious tolerance, equality and gender roles. The role of religion in the integration process is ambivalent. On the one hand, it provides support, on the other hand, it encourages demarcation. Schools and teaching staff play an important role in cultural integration.

==== Structural integration ====
Structural integration or placement is achieved when integration indicators such as the distribution of educational qualifications, unemployment and transfer payment rates, etc. in the group of immigrants are similar to those in the overall population. Structural integration or placement also involves the acquisition of rights. Time series data show a continuous improvement in structural integration, which sometimes lasts several generations. Hartmut Esser points out that placement is fundamental and that without it is difficult to develop a social and emotional attachment to the host society.

Immigrants can participate in non-resident citizen voting in elections in their country of origin. In addition, foreigners also have in some cases the privilege to participate in politics in local elections through non-citizen suffrage, for example within the European Union. However, citizens can also be excluded from elections: Great Britain, for example, does not grant its expatriates who have lived abroad for more than 15 years the right to vote in national elections, although this rule is often the subject of political debate. Immigrant foreigners can receive the right to political participation through naturalisation.

==== Social integration ====
Social integration takes into account the social contacts and group memberships of the individual. For example, club memberships, friendships and marriage behaviour are considered. For the first generation of migrants, contacts with members of their own culture of origin are often dominant. Interethnic contacts arise particularly in the education system and on the labour market. Sports clubs are also often considered to play a role in promoting integration. Participatory art projects that bring refugees and migrants together with communities in the host society are also considered to be particularly beneficial for integration.

Contacts and relationships with members of the host society are very beneficial for social integration, while being restricted to one's own ethnic-social group and the emergence of ethnic colonies is a significant disadvantage. Below-average contact with networks of the host society has a negative impact on educational success and on the search for apprenticeships or jobs.

==== Identity integration ====
Identity integration is about the subjective feelings and definition of a person's belonging to the cultural or national community – about an identification with the country of residence in fundamental questions. Friedrich Heckmann describes this as the "last stage of integration". The sociologist Wilhelm Heitmeyer emphasises that it is important for integration that people perceive themselves as recognised. If immigrants feel that they belong to both the host culture and the culture of origin, this is referred to as hybrid identity. The host culture and the culture of origin are then part of the multicollectivity of the immigrant person.

=== Integration as an acculturation strategy ===
According to the Canadian migration researcher John W. Berry integration is an acculturation strategy, i.e. a form of how minorities (especially immigrants) behave towards the dominant culture. Integration is in opposition to the other acculturation strategies of assimilation, segregation and marginalisation. During integration, a migrant retains characteristics of his or her culture of origin and at the same time maintains lively exchange relationships with the majority culture.

It is often reported that people with foreign-sounding surnames in Germany experience name discrimination when looking for employment or housing. This is associated with racism or ethnic prejudice.

== Actors ==
Integration is considered a two-way process. On the one hand, it requires the willingness of immigrants to integrate. On the other hand, certain conditions are also required on the part of the host society and the organs of the host state or its municipalities – such as the willingness to accept immigration and to create opportunities for participation and to remove barriers. In constitutional states, international law norms, together with the provisions of the respective constitution of the host country, form a framework for the officially granted scope for action of the actors.

At the supranational level, the European Union supports member states in developing and strengthening their integration policies. Its initiatives have included the Action Plan on the Integration of Third-Country Nationals and the New Skills Agenda. The latter introduced the EU Skills Profile Tool for Third-Country Nationals, which enables organisations and public authorities to identify migrants’ qualifications, professional experience and skills for use in education, employment and integration services.

Sociologist Shmuel Eisenstadt, who studied the adaptation process of immigrants in Israel and tried to draw general principles from it, speaks of the adaptation of the individual and of absorption into the host society. According to Eisenstadt, the social and societal adaptation of individuals depends crucially on whether the host society provides them with opportunities for adaptation in terms of social interaction and participation. According to Eisenstadt, adaptation includes three aspects: "learning and mastering social roles in the different areas of society; building stable social relationships with members of the native population; building and maintaining a positive identification with the new social structure and its value system".

Today, integration is referred to as the socialization of the individual, and in the case of children and young people, it is also referred to as education or enculturation. This can also result in a hybrid sense of belonging (see : Acculturation and Third culture kid).

According to Canadian psychologist John W. Berry, if integration is successful, it has advantages for society and, above all, for the psychosocial health of immigrants. Integration and integrative behaviour are demanded by authorities and other institutions, but at the same time are encouraged and rewarded under certain conditions through incentives. For example, certain integration achievements are required for the granting of a settlement permit or for the permit for permanent residence in the EU. In particular, the long-term residence permit for well-integrated tolerated persons should be mentioned: on this basis, young people in particular can receive a residence permit after six years if they have integrated accordingly.

== Legal framework ==
=== Legal norms concerning refugees ===
In the case of refugees under the Geneva Refugee Convention, the host nation has certain obligations with regard to the integration of the refugee in all these phases. These include, in particular, access to the host state's labour market (Article 17), access to schooling (Article 22), public welfare (Article 23) and facilitated integration and naturalisation (Article 34).

== Context, policy and research ==
Immigration is linked to the emergence of ethnic, national, linguistic and religious minorities.

From an economic perspective, migration is also seen in connection with demographic developments and a possible shortage of skilled workers. This includes talking about brain gain on the one hand and the social and economic costs of integration on the other.

The Migrant Integration Policy Index is used to evaluate the integration policies for migrants in all EU countries and three other non-EU countries based on fixed criteria.

=== Integration outcomes ===
There is a split on the degree to which individuals living in countries with the 18 largest migrant populations would want immigrants to integrate and the effects of integration on both immigrant and non-immigrant populations are varied. In the United States, for example, integration is successful in terms of education, employment and earnings, occupations, poverty, language, health, crime, and family patterns; however, successful integration does not necessarily entail improvement on well-being. Integration can even lead to further backlash against immigration by non-white populations who have assimilated successfully. It has been found that more than half of Hispanics support increased security among the border in order to reduce illegal crossings and that countries with a high share of immigrants may be more susceptible to favor right-wing policies such as strict immigration; thus, it has been suggested that successful integration does not guarantee continued patterns for future generations.

Compulsory conscription is found to improve social integration of immigrants.

== Social debate ==
There are various theories about what a society shaped by migration is like. A multicultural society is based on the assumption that people of different nationalities, languages, religions and ethnicities can live together peacefully and that the different cultures, traditions, lifestyles and/or ideas about values and ethics can be preserved.

The Cultural Mainstreaming approach sees cultural diversity as a resource. When implementing changes, this approach always takes into account the impact on the lives of people with a migration background. This may require both adaptation by immigrants and changes in the majority society.

However, there are also points of view that consider these ideas to be unrealistic or wrong. For example, in her 2007 book The Multicultural Error, Seyran Ateş argued for a "transcultural society" in which immigrants are at home in at least two cultures, namely in their culture of origin as well as in the culture of their host society. If there are irreconcilable differences between the two cultures, however, the culture of the host society takes precedence. The Syrian-German political scientist Bassam Tibi wrote in 2001: "Integration requires being able to provide an identity. Every identity requires a dominant culture" The term Leitkultur (dominant culture) has been used in social debate ever since. This term is also associated with the term "liberal democratic basic order" commonly used in constitutional jurisprudence.

With regard to the value basis of a pluralistic society, scientific and social debates are sparked by the question of the extent to which religiously influenced value systems facilitate or hinder integration. There is even disagreement about the importance and weighting to be given to this question.

According to the German political scientist Stefan Luft, the integration of immigrants requires "integration policy realism beyond multiculturalism and cultural pessimism".

=== Values ===
Immigrants and members of the host society hardly differ in their assessment of basic community values such as "respect for human life", "respect for other religions and cultures", "appreciation of peace, democracy, solidarity, justice", "respect for law, order and the rule of law". These values are each considered important by around 90 percent.

=== Integration and radicalization ===
Following a series of attacks and assassinations in July 2016, political discussions arose, on the one hand mainly with regard to the prevention of radicalisation and terrorist attacks, especially by Islamist terrorism, and on the other hand with regard to the everyday nature of certain crimes, such as groping in crowds and sexual harassment in outdoor swimming pools.

Marwan Abou-Taam, an Islamic scholar working for the State Criminal Police Office of Rhineland-Palatinate, believes that the third generation of Muslim immigrants, who experience rejection both from their parents and from the German majority society, are particularly susceptible to extremism. In France, there is an ongoing debate about the causes of the emergence of parallel societies and radicalisation in the suburbs – the so-called Banlieues. In 2012, political scientist Gilles Kepel told the Neue Zürcher Zeitung that, given the situation in the suburbs, a "quantum leap in educational policy" was necessary, which would give all school leavers at least a real chance of finding work. In 2016, he told the Tages-Anzeiger that the "poorly integrated, unemployed Muslim youth of the French suburbs" represented a recruiting potential for jihadism. However, after the 2016 Brussels bombings, Islam researcher Olivier Roy put forward the theory that radicalisation is not the result of failed integration; young men are making a radical break with their parents' generation and consider themselves 'better' Muslims than their parents. There is also a "fascination with suicide" and "fantasies of violence" among young people.

== OECD recommendations ==
In early 2016, the Organisation for Economic Co-operation and Development (OECD) underlined the importance of integration in a guide, stressing that it should not, however, come at the expense of supporting other disadvantaged groups, including migrants already resident and their children. In this guide, it made ten recommendations, which are reproduced here verbatim:

1. Offer activation and integration measures to humanitarian immigrants and asylum seekers with a high prospect of staying as quickly as possible.
2. Facilitate access to the labour market for asylum seekers with a high prospect of staying.
3. Take employment prospects into account when distributing the benefits.
4. Record and assess qualifications, professional experience and skills acquired by refugees abroad.
5. Take into account the increasing heterogeneity of humanitarian migrants and develop needs-based approaches.
6. Detect mental and physical illnesses early and offer appropriate help.
7. Develop support programmes for unaccompanied minors who are no longer of school age upon arrival.
8. Involve civil society in the integration of humanitarian migrants.
9. Promote equal access to integration services for humanitarian migrants across the country.
10. Take into account the fact that the integration of very low-skilled humanitarian migrants requires long-term training and support measures.

== Individual nations ==
=== United States ===
The United States has always been an immigration country, as a result of the European colonization of the Americas. The idea of the melting pot, which is widespread in the US, assumes that the different cultures will become more similar. The idea of the salad bowl, on the other hand, assumes that the peculiarities of different cultures will continue to exist side by side. Children of immigrants who are born in the USA automatically acquire American citizenship due to birthright citizenship. Nevertheless, the integration of immigrants into US society usually requires more than one generation: children of immigrants regularly achieve higher standards in terms of educational qualifications, professional level and home ownership than their parents.

=== Canada ===
In Canada, immigration is the largest contributor to population growth. On average, immigrants have higher educational qualifications than the native population. The country has a selective immigration policy with a points system that favours qualified workers by taking personal skills, experience and age into account. In addition, there are targets for the number and origin of immigrants, similar to a quota system. New arrivals are offered integration assistance, which also includes language courses that can be completed in the country of origin. Since 2015, there have been no more occupational group-specific quotas for immigration, international qualifications are additionally checked, job offers and knowledge of English and French are given greater weight, and the number of immigrants is limited to 230,000 to 250,000 per year (as of 2016). Especially with regard to refugees, private individuals and initiatives in Canada are able to sponsor privately. The sponsors undertake to provide the refugee with the following support for one year: assistance in finding accommodation, financial support, social and emotional support, food and clothing.

=== France ===
In France, a voluntary integration contract (Contrat d'accueil et d'intégration, CAI) was introduced in 2003 as a pilot project in twelve departments and extended to the whole of France in 2006; in July 2016 it was replaced by the Contrat d'intégration républicaine (CIR). Signing the contract is not compulsory for immigrants, but if signed, it is binding; anyone who decides not to sign the contract must expect disadvantages when obtaining a permanent residence permit.

=== Netherlands ===
In the Netherlands, since 2007, an integration law (wet inburgering) has required certain immigrants to take a compulsory test to assess their knowledge of the Dutch language, society and certain aspects of the labour market, which must be taken after three and a half or five years. For people living abroad who wish to immigrate, another law (wet inburgering in het buitenland) lays down similar provisions. Failure to pass the test has financial consequences. A law that came into force in 2013 (wet inburgering 2013) shortens the time until the test to three years and also stipulates that immigrants must cover the preparation and costs of the test themselves, although it is possible to obtain a loan for this. However, as of May 2016, 47,000 of the 53,000 people who should have passed the test had not yet fulfilled their obligation.

=== Austria ===
In Austria, an expert council for integration was set up in 2010 to oversee the implementation of the Austrian National Integration Plan (NAP.I). Since then, the expert council based in the Federal Chancellery has published an integration report every year. The data basis for this was significantly expanded in 2017 with Section 21 of the Austrian Integration Act. In addition, Statistics Austria publishes a "Statistical Yearbook on Migration and Integration" every year.

In 2007, an "integration and diversity monitoring" was set up in the city of Vienna, the reports of which are published every three years. The last integration and diversity monitor of the City of Vienna was presented in December 2020 and, in addition to the level of integration of the Viennese population, also deals with the diversity management of the administration and the diversity of the city's staff.

The National Action Plan for Integration (NAP.I), adopted by the Council of Ministers on 19 January 2010, includes measures to promote the integration of migrants, EU citizens and people whose native language is not German, as well as those entitled to asylum and those entitled to subsidiary protection. Since the beginning of 2016, Austria's nationwide integration strategy has been defined by the 50-point plan for integration, which includes 50 measures for the integration of recognized refugees and those entitled to subsidiary protection.

On 28 March 2017, the Council of Ministers passed the Integration Act, the main goal of which is to promote and encourage integration. This law describes integration as a process affecting society as a whole, which requires "a coordinated approach by the various state and civil society actors" and "an active contribution from every single person in Austria within the scope of their own possibilities" (Section 2 IntG).

The Integration Act provides, among other things, for a consistent and binding system for German and values courses by means of a mandatory integration declaration, as well as a nationwide uniform integration test and higher quality standards. In addition, on the same day, it passed the Integration Year Act, which provides for a mandatory standardized integration program – the "Integration Year Act" – for those entitled to asylum, those entitled to subsidiary protection and asylum seekers with a high probability of recognition from September 2017. As part of this program, they are obliged to carry out community service and, as part of the program, receive a skills assessment and German and values courses.

Asylum seekers who have been admitted to the asylum procedure for at least 3 months may be employed in private households for typical household services by means of a service voucher.

In Austria, mother tongue support is open to all students whose mother tongue is not German or to bilingual students, regardless of their nationality.

In Austria, an Integration Agreement from 2003 stipulates that migrants should be able to demonstrate language skills at competency level A2 of the Common European Framework of Reference for Languages two years after their entry.

In Austria, unrestricted access to the labour market is only possible for recognised refugees or persons entitled to subsidiary protection.

=== Switzerland ===
In Switzerland, the integration of foreigners is regulated in Article 4 of the Foreign Nationals and Integration Act (AuG):

1. The aim of integration is the coexistence of the native and foreign resident population on the basis of the values of the Federal Constitution and mutual respect and tolerance.
2. Integration is intended to enable long-term and legally present foreigners to participate in the economic, social and cultural life of society.
3. Integration requires both the will of foreigners and the openness of the Swiss population.
4. It is necessary for foreigners to familiarise themselves with the social and living conditions in Switzerland and, in particular, to learn a national language.

According to Article 2 of the Ordinance on the Integration of Foreign Nationals (VIntA), the aim of integration is to ensure that foreign nationals have equal opportunities to participate in Swiss society. According to Article 5 VIntA, the contribution of foreign nationals to their integration is shown in particular:

a. in respecting the rule of law and the values of the Federal Constitution;
b. in learning the national language spoken at the place of residence;
c. in dealing with living conditions in Switzerland;
d. in the willingness to participate in economic life and to acquire education.

The authorities shall take into account integration pursuant to Article 3 VIntA when exercising their discretion regarding the early granting of the foreigner's ID card.

Integration into the community is also taken into account when naturalising as a Swiss citizen Based on the Citizenship Ordinance of 17 June 2016, nationwide integration criteria for those wishing to naturalise have been in place since 1 January 2018.

=== Liechtenstein ===
With a population of less than 40,000, Liechtenstein is home to people from over 100 different nations. The proportion of foreigners in Liechtenstein in 2010 was 33%, lower than in comparable microstates Monaco (78%), Andorra (64%) and Luxembourg (43%). Two-thirds of the jobs in Liechtenstein are occupied by foreign nationals, and most of them are commuters, meaning they do not have residency. Liechtenstein issues only 72 residence permits to European Economic Area (EEA) citizens and 17 to Swiss citizens each year. Liechtenstein has negotiated an exception to the freedom of movement of persons required for other EEA states, allowing the country to set such quotas for immigration. However, EEA nationals with a residence permit have the right to full family reunification, and EU citizens may stay in Liechtenstein for three months without having to register.

Integration is a concern for society as a whole in Liechtenstein, and efforts to ensure that differences and diversity are dealt with consciously and carefully are directed at all members of society: newcomers and natives.

The principles of integration are laid down in Section 6 of the Aliens Act (AuG), the requirement to learn languages in Section 5 of the Act on the Free Movement of EEA and Swiss Nationals (PFZG), educational support in Sections 1, 44 and 58 of the Vocational Training Act (BBG) and in Sections 1 and 16 to 24 of the School Act, as well as the Ordinance on Native Language Teaching, which provides for the support of school-age children of migrant workers in their mother tongue and in native language studies.

In 2007, the government of Liechtenstein adopted a policy paper on Liechtenstein's integration policy and in 2010 an integration concept entitled"Integration - Strength through Diversity". The 2007 policy paper called for a "conscious and careful approach to difference and diversity". The integration concept included five key ideas:

1. Utilizing potential – resource-oriented (overcoming the "deficit approach"), focusing on school education and raising awareness in families
2. Experiencing diversity – in the sense of diversity
3. Enable participation and promote cohesion – with gradual achievement of equal opportunities and equity in the education system, with a further opening of voluntary work for foreigners and in line with "intercultural cities"
4. Taking responsibility together – to ensure long-term quality of life
5. Promoting multilingualism – with German as the "personal adopted language" of immigrants.

The integration model used is that of Kenan Güngör (who draws on Friedrich Heckmann and Hartmut Esser), with successive stages of structural, social, cultural and identification integration. In 2010, the government drew up an integration concept based on the principle of support and demand, with five guiding principles that were closely linked to the five previously established guiding principles. However, its implementation stalled from 2012 onwards due to austerity policies and restructuring. The Council of Europe body European Commission against Racism and Intolerance (ECRI) made calls and recommendations for reforms, among others. They concerned in particular strengthening the political participation of foreign residents, abolishing the vote by community residents as a regular procedure for naturalisation and improving educational and professional integration. The Human Rights Council and ECRI also proposed new steps to take against racial discrimination, discrimination and extremism.

=== Other states ===
According to Stefan Luft, failed social and structural integration in France and the British Isles, combined with diverging values, has led to the emergence of parallel societies dominated by Islam and to a considerable potential for conflict, which has resulted in unrest that has flared up again and again for decades. It is therefore of central importance to achieve successful integration into the education system and the labour market and to decisively counter religious intolerance and hatred.

Italy and the United Kingdom also have private refugee sponsorship programmes.

== See also ==
- Cultural sustainability
