= CPA Donald O. Hebb Award for Distinguished Contributions to Psychology as a Science =

Award conferred by the Canadian Psychological Association

The CPA Donald O. Hebb Award for Distinguished Contributions to Psychology as a Science is an annual award presented by the Canadian Psychological Association (CPA).

The Hebb award is presented to an individual who has made a significant contribution to Canadian psychology as a scientific discipline (as a researcher, teacher, theorist, spokesperson, or public policy developer). Recipients are nominated by their peers and selected by a committee of CPA Fellows. The prize was originally named the Award for Distinguished Contributions to Canadian Psychology as a Science when it was presented to its first recipient, Donald O. Hebb, in 1980. The 1986 award was the first to carry Hebb's name in its title.

This award is not to be confused with other awards also named after Hebb. The American Psychological Association's Society for Behavioral Neuroscience and Comparative Psychology (SBNCP) presents the D.O. Hebb Distinguished Scientific Contributions Award for research in behavioral neuroscience and/or comparative psychology. The Canadian Society for Brain, Behaviour and Cognitive Science (CSBBCS) presents the Donald O. Hebb Distinguished Contribution Award for contributions to the science of the brain, behaviour, and cognition.

== Recipients ==
Award recipients by year
| Year | Recipient | Institution (at time of award) |
|---|---|---|
| 1980 | Donald O. Hebb | McGill University |
| 1981 | Brenda Milner | McGill University |
| 1982 | Allan Paivio | University of Western Ontario |
| 1983 | Endel Tulving | University of Toronto |
| 1984 | Wallace Lambert | McGill University |
| 1985 | Doreen Kimura | University of Western Ontario |
| 1986 | Ronald Melzack | McGill University |
| 1987 | Fergus I. M. Craik | University of Toronto |
| 1988 | M. Philip Bryden | University of Waterloo |
| 1989 | not awarded | not awarded |
| 1990 | Zenon Pylyshyn | University of Western Ontario |
| 1991 | Adrien Pinard | Université du Québec à Montréal |
| 1992 | Peter C. Dodwell | Queen's University |
| 1993 | Mark Zanna | University of Waterloo |
| 1994 | Franco Lepore | Université de Montréal |
| 1995 | Anthony Phillips | University of British Columbia |
| 1996 | Peter Suedfeld | University of British Columbia |
| 1997 | Norman S. Endler | York University |
| 1998 | John W. Berry | Queen's University |
| 1999 | Byron P. Rourke | University of Windsor |
| 2000 | Bryan Kolb | University of Lethbridge |
| 2001 | Kenneth Dion | University of Toronto |
| 2002 | Kenneth D. Craig | University of British Columbia |
| 2003 | David M. Regan | York University |
| 2004 | Albert Bregman | McGill University |
| 2005 | David A. Wolfe | Centre for Addiction and Mental Health / University of Toronto |
| 2006 | Patrick McGrath | Dalhousie University |
| 2007 | Barbara B. Sherwin | McGill University |
| 2008 | Vernon Quinsey | Queen's University |
| 2009 | Charles Morin | Université Laval |
| 2010 | Robert D. Hare | University of British Columbia |
| 2011 | Robert J. Vallerand | Université du Québec à Montréal |
| 2012 | Colin M. MacLeod | University of Waterloo |
| 2013 | Keith S. Dobson | University of Calgary |
| 2014 | Gordon J. G. Asmundson | University of Regina |
| 2015 | Debra Pepler | York University |
| 2016 | Joel D. Katz | York University |
| 2017 | Michel Dugas | Université du Québec en Outaouais |
| 2018 | Jeffrey Mogil | McGill University |
| 2019 | Paul Hewitt | University of British Columbia |
| 2020 | Michael Seto | |
| 2021 | Richard Koestner | |
| 2022 | not awarded | not awarded |
| 2023 | Sherry Stewart | |

== See also ==
- List of psychology awards
- Canadian Psychological Association
- APA Award for Distinguished Scientific Contributions to Psychology
