= Patrick McGrath =

Patrick McGrath or Paddy McGrath may refer to:

- Patrick McGrath (novelist) (born 1950), British novelist
- Patrick J. McGrath (1945–2023), Roman Catholic bishop to the Diocese of San Jose, CA
- Patrick McGrath (psychologist) (born 1948), Canadian psychologist
- Patrick McGrath (Irish politician) (died 1956), Irish Fianna Fáil politician
- Patrick W. McGrath (1927–2001), Irish Fine Gael politician
- Patrick McGrath (Irish republican) (1894–1940)
- Sir Patrick Thomas McGrath (1868–1929), Newfoundland politician
- Patrick Rory McGrath (born 1956), British comedian, television personality, and writer
- Paddy McGrath (born 1989), Irish Gaelic footballer
- Paddy McGrath (rugby union) (born 1941), Irish rugby union player

== See also ==
- Pat McGrath (disambiguation)
