= Vicki Abt =

American sociologist (1942–2026)

- Abt during testimony in Amedure v. Jenny Jones Show, 1999
- Born: Isleen Vicki Abt; December 9, 1942; New York City, U.S.
- Died: February 1, 2026 (aged 83); Lansdale, Pennsylvania, U.S.

Academic background
- Education: Hofstra University; Pennsylvania State University; Temple University

Academic work
- Discipline: Sociology
- Institutions: Pennsylvania State University

Isleen Vicki Abt (December 9, 1942 – February 1, 2026) was an American sociologist. She was a professor of sociology and American studies at Pennsylvania State University's Abington College. Her research primarily explored commercial gambling and talk shows, and their impacts on American society; Abt was a critic of both institutions.

== Life and career ==
Abt was born on December 9, 1942, in Brooklyn, New York. She was raised in Franklin Square, New York. Her father was the president of a metal-castings foundry and her mother was the office manager and bookkeeper. She graduated from H. Frank Carey High School and in 1963 received a BA in social science from Hofstra University. She received a master's from Penn State, and her PhD from Temple University.

In 1985, Abt published The Business of Risk: Commercial Gambling in Mainstream America with James F. Smith and Eugene Martin Christiansen. By 1994, Abt was a professor at Penn State, and continuing to study and comment on the negative effects of gambling. She taught sociology and American studies.

In 1994, she co-authored the article "The Shameless World of Phil, Sally and Oprah" in The Journal of Popular Culture. The article offered a critique of daytime talk shows, including Oprah Winfrey, Phil Donahue, and Sally Jessy Raphael. The piece caused Winfrey to reflect upon her style and change, stating that she wished to "disassociate ourselves from the 'trash pack'". Later that year, she appeared on Winfey's talk show. In 1997, she published the book Coming After Oprah: Cultural Fallout in the Age of the TV Talk Show with Leonard Mustazza.

== Personal life and death ==
Abt was from Montgomery County, Pennsylvania.

Abt died from respiratory failure at a hospital in Lansdale, Pennsylvania, on February 1, 2026, at the age of 83.

== Publications ==
=== Books ===
- Abt, Vicki; Smith, James F.; Christiansen, Eugene Martin (1988). The Business of Risk: Commercial Gambling in Mainstream America.
- Abt, Vicki; Mustazza, Leonard (1997). Coming After Oprah: Cultural Fallout in the Age of the TV Talk Show. Bowling Green, OH: Popular Press. ISBN 0 87972 752 7.

=== Articles ===
- Abt, Vicki; McGurrin, Martin C.; Smith, James F. (January 1984). "Gambling: The misunderstood sport— a problem in social definition". Leisure Sciences. 6 (2): 205–220. doi:10.1080/01490408409513031. ISSN 0149-0400.
- Abt, Vicki; McGurrin, Martin C.; Smith, James F. (September 1, 1985). "Toward a synoptic model of gambling behavior". Journal of Gambling Behavior. 1 (2): 79–88. doi:10.1007/BF01019860. ISSN 1573-3602.
- Abt, Vicki; Smith, James F.; McGurrin, Martin C. (March 1, 1985). "Ritual, risk, and reward: A role analysis of race track and casino encounters". Journal of Gambling Behavior. 1 (1): 64–75. doi:10.1007/BF01019756. ISSN 1573-3602.
- Abt, Vicki; McGurrin, Martin C. (December 1, 1992). "Commercial gambling and values in American society: The social construction of risk". Journal of Gambling Studies. 8 (4): 413–420. doi:10.1007/BF01024127. ISSN 1573-3602.
- Abt, Vicki; Seesholtz, Mel (Summer 1994). "The Shameless World of Phil, Sally and Oprah: Television talk shows and the deconstructing of society". Journal of Popular Culture. 28 (1). Oxford.
