= David Wolfe =

David Wolfe may refer to:

- David Wolfe (mathematician), co-author of Mathematical Go Endgames
- David Wolfe (Jesuit) (died 1578), Irish papal legate
- David A. Wolfe (born 1951), psychologist and author
- David Avocado Wolfe (born 1970), product spokesman and promoter of pseudoscientific theories
- David Møller Wolfe (born 2002), Norwegian footballer
- David W. Wolfe (born 1942), member of the New Jersey General Assembly

== See also ==
- David Wolf (disambiguation)
