= Paul Hewitt (disambiguation) =

Paul Hewitt (born 1963) is an American basketball coach

Paul Hewitt may also refer to:

- Paul Hewitt (psychologist), Canadian psychologist
- Paul G. Hewitt (born 1931), American physicist, author, and cartoonist
