= Migrant Integration Policy Index =

First published in 2004, the Migrant Integration Policy Index (MIPEX) is a country index and accompanying study that evaluates integration policies for migrants in all EU countries and three other non-EU countries based on established criteria.

The study was conducted jointly by 25 organizations, including the German Friedrich Ebert Foundation, under the leadership of the British Council. Co-financed by the EU INTI program for the integration of non-EU foreigners, it is usually updated every four years.

== Criteria ==
MIPEX measures indicators in various areas, such as:

- Labor market mobility
- Possibility of family reunification
- Access to educational opportunities
- Access to health services
- Possibility of long-term residence
- Possibility of political participation
- Access to citizenship of the host country
- Anti-discrimination measures

== Country ranking ==
In 2011, Sweden was the only European country to be awarded the rating "favorable" (the top level in the favorable half). Access to the labor market for migrants was outstanding there, which earned it the "best practice" award. Germany ranked 12th overall at that time. By the end of 2025, Finland (84 pts. / 2024) and Portugal (83 pts. / 2023) ranked just two and three points, respectively, behind Sweden (86 pts. / 2023). "Sweden's comprehensive approach to integration has remained largely unchanged since 2019, as reflected in its consistent overall score of 86 on the 100-point MIPEX scale."

== Criticism ==
Leading migration and integration experts did not agree upon the definition of ideal cases ("best practice") used in a study without binding legal requirements for all categories. The study measures the quality of the framework conditions in particular countries that can promote the potential integration of immigrants into that country without assessing the actual state of integration, which could be measured using other indicators (marriage patterns, labor force participation, average income, etc.). Furthermore, countries' policies and legal frameworks are only comparable to a limited extent, as they are the result of different welfare models and different migration histories. According to experts, "naming, blaming, and shaming" countries with such different histories based on the ranking would be a gross simplification of complex circumstances and is scientifically unfair.

Another type of criticism has been voiced in Switzerland: "Rankings are unfair because their creators have a great deal of freedom in selecting and weighting indicators determining what is positive and what is negative." Much of what those responsible for MIPEX consider to be "failures" is entirely intentional on the part of politicians and/or the majority of the population in the countries criticized. In Switzerland, for example, short deadlines for naturalization or residence permits for foreigners are not necessarily viewed positively, unlike with MIPEX.

In 2017, political scientist Ruud Koopmans criticized the index by contrasting assimilation with multiculturalism.
