= Immigration country =

State with rapid population growth from immigration

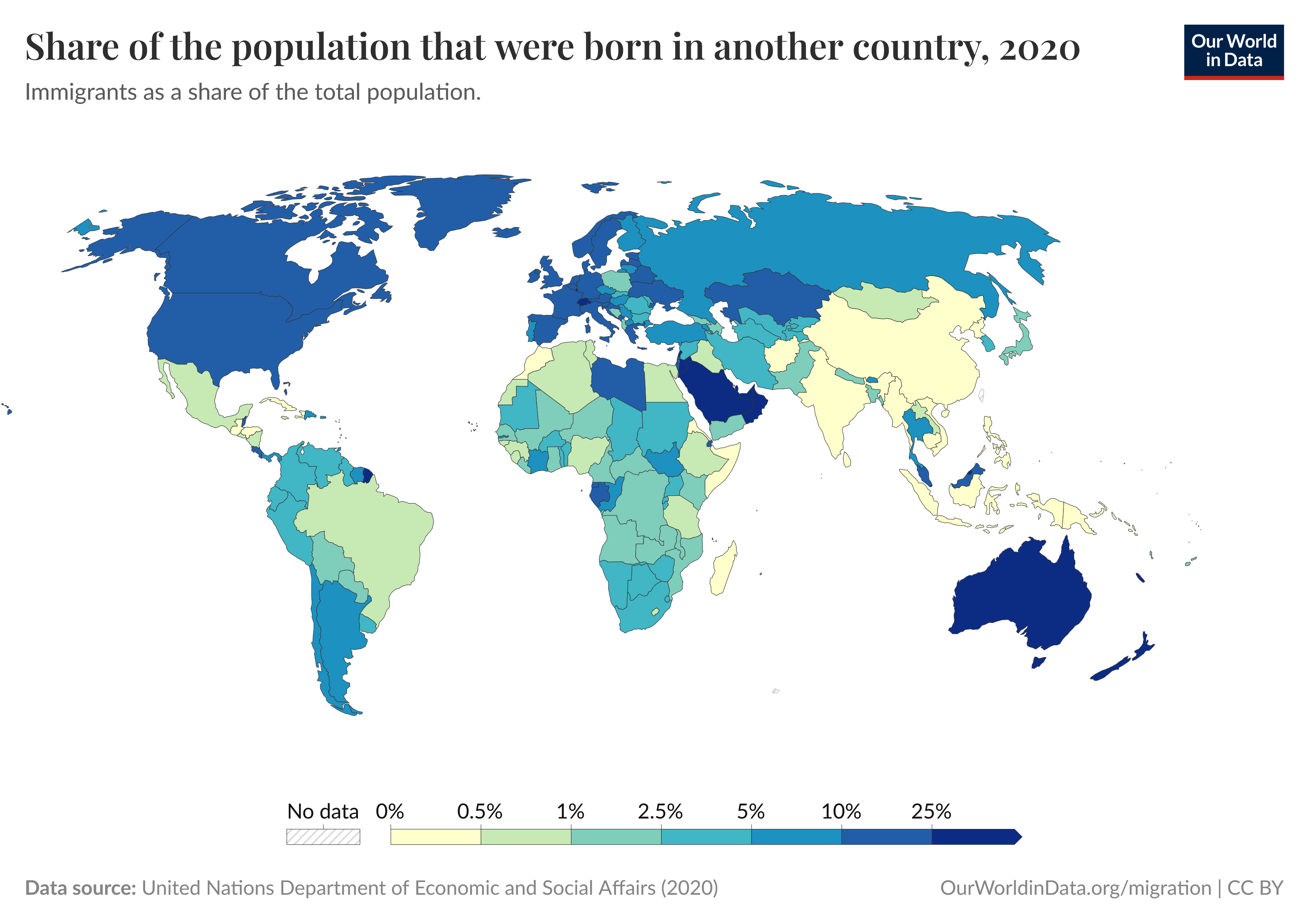
Share of population born in another country, (2020, Our World in Data)

The term immigration country describes a state whose population is growing rapidly due to immigration from other countries or in which immigrants make up a significant part of the population. The term is sometimes used as a political slogan.

When referring to the people of the immigration country, one also speaks of an immigrant society or, if the temporary character of immigration is to be emphasized, of an immigration society.

== Immigration countries in comparison ==
Typical immigration countries are Argentina, Australia, Brazil, Israel, Canada, New Zealand, South Africa, the United States, and other countries, particularly in South America. These are countries in which a large proportion of the population is descended from immigrants. In many cases, immigration was deliberately encouraged, often due to low population density combined with a shortage of labour, in other cases for military-strategic reasons, for example to be able to provide a reason for occupying a claimed territory through a population presence. Large migration movements to these countries occurred particularly in the 19th and early 20th centuries.

In the course of globalization, a change occurred around the time of the Great Depression and the Second World War. While the traditional immigration countries controlled immigration through immigration laws and limited it as needed, numerous former emigration countries became targets of immigration, particularly the states of the European Union. Especially since about 1990, the conditions for immigration in these countries have been gradually relaxed, with the southern European countries, especially Spain, taking a pioneering role. In recent times, these countries are also generally referred to as immigration countries, even if the specific use of this term is often controversial in public.

In 2013, 232 million people lived outside their home country (about 3.2 percent of the world's population). The United States received the most immigrants (45.8 million people), followed by Russia (about 11 million) and Germany (9.8 million).

The UN Migration Report of 2024 gives the following ranking of the countries with the most immigrants:

1. United States (52.4 million)
2. Germany (16.8 million)
3. Saudi Arabia (13.7 million)
4. United Kingdom (11.8 million)
5. France (9.2 million)

=== Germany ===
Germany is considered an immigration country (German: Einwanderungsland).

More than three million refugees and asylum seekers live in Germany, more than in any other European country.

As of 2017, Germany is the third most popular immigration country in the world, after the United States and Saudi Arabia. As of December 2025, immigrants from almost all regions of the world live in Germany.

In 2011, the total proportion of the population with a migration background as defined by official statistics (i.e. people who have immigrated to the current federal territory from outside Germany since 1949 and their descendants) was around 19 percent (15 million inhabitants) and the total proportion of the population without German citizenship was 8.3 percent (6.6 million inhabitants).

In 2021, 17.3 percent of Germany's population (approximately 14.2 million people) had immigrated to the country since 1950, exceeding the EU average of 10.6 percent. Moreover, a further 4.7 percent were German-born citizens of two immigrant parents since 1950. Therefore, 23 percent of the population (approximately 19 million people) either immigrated themselves or have parents who both immigrated to Germany.

The term "country of immigration" has been used for the Federal Republic since the beginning of the immigration of so-called "guest workers" in recognition of the de facto immigration, but was controversial in public for many years. The guest workers were recruited primarily in the 1960s, after the West German cities had been rebuilt and workers were needed for the prosperous companies of the economic miracle years. The recognition that Germany is a country of immigration has been more firmly established, at least in science and politics, since the turn of the millennium.

In a historical context, it can be seen that Germany was always an important country of immigration at certain times. In the 16th and 17th centuries, Huguenots from France who were persecuted for religious reasons immigrated to Germany; during the time of industrialisation in the German Empire, large numbers of Polish workers (Ruhr Poles) and Italians immigrated. In addition to the guest workers in the 1960s and 1970s, since the 1980s there have been large numbers of immigrants from the former Soviet republics, from Poland and, during the time of the Yugoslav Wars, from the former Yugoslavia. Due to the 2008 financial crisis and the resulting economic problems (especially youth unemployment) in places like Spain, Greece, Portugal and Italy, Germany has developed into a stable location that is attractive to immigrants. In addition to migrants from European countries, Germany is also a popular destination for academics and entrepreneurs from other parts of the world; the number of Israelis in Germany, for example, has increased sharply in the years since 2010.

=== Israel ===
Israel's population has grown rapidly since its founding in 1948. During and shortly after the 1948 Palestine war, the new state took in hundreds of thousands of Holocaust survivors from Europe, and Mizrahi Jews from the Middle East and North Africa. The One Million Plan strategy had been devised in 1944, but was unable to be implemented until independence. Other major immigration waves to Israel were the airlifts of Operation Moses (1984), Operation Joshua (1985), and Operation Solomon (1991), which brought most Ethiopian Jews to Israel, and the 1990s post-Soviet aliyah, of Jews from the former Soviet Union, now free to emigrate.

=== Switzerland ===
Switzerland has one of the highest proportion of foreigners (residents without Swiss citizenship) of all European countries, accounting for 27 percent of the population (see further Immigrant proportions by country). It has been a country of immigration since the 1960s. Switzerland's population has increased 2.7-fold between 1900 and 2025. One of the reasons for this was the high demand for workers in a rapidly growing economy; previously low-skilled jobs were increasingly only filled by immigrants. However, the seasonal worker status was initially used to balance the economy's need for workers and what critics called "Überfremdung" of a growing foreign population : foreign (mainly southern European) workers received seasonal work permits, but had to leave the country again afterwards. Even for newly settled people, family reunification was almost impossible during the initial phase of their stay.

A 2000 Swiss referendum resulted in a majority in favour of concluding a bilateral agreement with the EU on the free movement of persons ; this was again pushed for primarily by the economy, with its need for a predominantly well-qualified workforce. Full freedom of movement was introduced in several steps. Since the borders to the EU were fully opened, the already high level of immigration has accelerated significantly. Even with the rise in unemployment since 2009 in the wake of the economic crisis, the immigration surplus has remained almost unchanged. This has prompted right-wing political circles (especially the SVP) to call for the application of the safety valve clause set out in the bilateral agreements, which could lead to certain immigration quotas being reintroduced. The termination of the free movement of persons demanded by some representatives became reality with the referendum on 8 February 2014: 50.3% of those eligible to vote voted for the federal popular initiative "Against mass immigration". This means that the free movement of persons must be restricted within three years.

== See also ==
- Human migration
- Integration of immigrants
- Opposition to immigration
- Public support of immigration
- List of sovereign states by immigrant and emigrant population
- Settler colonialism

== Literature ==
- Karl-Heinz Meier-Braun, Reinhold Weber: Deutschland Einwanderungsland: Begriffe – Fakten – Kontroversen. Kohlhammer Verlag, 2017, ISBN 978-3-17-031865-6
