= Pat McGrath (disambiguation) =

Dame Pat McGrath (born 1970) is a British make-up artist.

Pat McGrath may also refer to:

- Pat McGrath (Waterford hurler) (born 1953), Irish hurler
- Pat McGrath (Tipperary hurler) (born 1961), Irish hurler
- Pat McGrath (journalist) (born 1975), Irish journalist

== See also ==
- Patrick McGrath (disambiguation)
