= Adrien Pinard =

Canadian psychologist (1916–1998)

- Born: February 14, 1916; Montréal
- Died: September 3, 1998 (aged 82); Montréal
- Citizenship: Canadian
- Occupation: Psychologist

Academic background
- Education: Université de Montréal

Academic work
- Discipline: Psychology
- Sub-discipline: Developmental psychology
- Institutions: UQAM

Adrien Pinard (1916-1998), was a Canadian psychologist and noted researcher in developmental psychology.

== Biography ==
He worked at the Université de Montréal from which he retired in 1981 as emeritus Professor of Psychology.

He was the founder of the Quebec Society of Professional Psychology Ordre des psychologues du Québec and was elected President of the Canadian Psychological Association in 1964.

== Publications ==
- Pinard, A. (1980) The Conservation of Conservation: A Unification of Piaget's Model. Chicago: University of Chicago Press.
- Laurendeau, M., & Pinard, A. (1970). The Development of the Concept of Space in the Child. New York: International Universities Press.
- Laurendeau, M., & Pinard, A. (1963). Causal Thinking in the Child: A Genetic and Experimental Approach. New York: International Universities Press.
- Pinard, A. (1992). Métaconscience et métacognition [metaconsciousness and metacognition]. Canadian Psychology/Psychologie Canadienne, 33(1), 27–41

== Awards ==
- 1991: CPA Donald O. Hebb Award for Distinguished Contributions to Psychology as a Science
- 1986: Fellow of the Royal Society of Canada
- 1986: Prix Léon-Gérin
- 1983: Prix Acfas Marcel-Vincent
- 1970: Bourse Killam
- 1962: Fellow of the Canadian Psychological Association

== Legacy ==
In 2014, a building at UQAM was named in his honour. The Adrien Pinard Prize was established by the Société Québécoise pour la Recherche en Psychologie for an individual who has made an outstanding contribution to psychology.
