= David Wolf =

David Wolf may refer to:

- David Wolf (astronaut) (born 1956), American astronaut
- David Wolf (ice hockey) (born 1989), German ice hockey player
- David Wolf: Secret Agent, computer game developed by Dynamix, Inc.

== See also ==
- David Wolfe (disambiguation)
