= Peter C. Dodwell =

Canadian psychologist (1930–2006)

Peter Carpenter Dodwell
- Born: 1930; India
- Died: 19 September 2006 (aged 75–76); Victoria, British Columbia
- Citizenship: Canadian
- Occupation: Psychologist

Academic background
- Education: University of Oxford
- Thesis: (1958)

Academic work
- Discipline: Psychology
- Sub-discipline: Perceptual psychology
- Institutions: Queen's University at Kingston

Peter Carpenter Dodwell also known as Peter Dodwell (1930-2006) was a Canadian psychologist who conducted sustained research on spatial vision.

== Biography ==
Dodwell was born in India in 1930. He moved to England at an early age and completed his education there. He obtained undergraduate degree in philosophy and psychology from the University of Oxford followed by his D. Phil. in Experimental Psychology in 1958. He taught for three years at Birkbeck, University of London (1955–58) and then moved to Canada where he worked in Queen's University at Kingston for the remainder of his career. He was appointed in 1965 and was Head of the Psychology Department from 1972 to 1981.

He was elected President of the Canadian Psychological Association in 1985.

== Research ==
He spent his whole academic career researching aspects of perception and vision. This included research on encoding, spatial form, pattern discrimination, perceptual development, and perceptual adaptation. He was best known for his research on the application of the Lie group to form perception. He was the Founding North American editor of the journal Spatial Vision. This journal published a special issue in 1994 recognising his contribution.

He was also concerned about broader issues and in his retirement wrote a book about the spiritual basis for human culture and creativity

== Awards ==
- 1992: CPA Donald O. Hebb Award for Distinguished Contributions to Psychology as a Science
- 1989: Fellow of the Royal Society of Canada
- C.D. Howe Memorial Fellowship
- Guggenheim Fellowship
- Killam Research Fellowship

== Publications ==
- Dodwell, P.C. (1957a). Shape-recognition in rats. British Journal of Psychology, 48, 221–229.
- Dodwell, P.C. (1957b). Shape discrimination in the octopus and the rat. Nature, 179, 1088-1088.
- Dodwell, P.C. Shape-recognition - a reply to Deutsch. British Journal of Psychology, 49, 158–159.
- Dodwell, P.C. (1960). Children's understanding of number and related concepts. Canadian Journal of Psychology, 14, 191–205.
- Dodwell, P.C. (1960). Causes of behavior and explanation in psychology. Mind, 69, 1–13.
- Dodwell, P.C. (1960). Discrimination of small shapes by the rat. Quarterly Journal of Experimental Psychology, 12, 237–241.
- Dodwell, P.C. (1961). Coding and learning in shape discrimination. Psychological Review, 68, 373–382.
