= Sherry Stewart =

Canadian clinical psychologist

Sherry H. Stewart
- Born: May 6, 1965 (age 61); Halifax, NS, Canada

Academic background
- Education: B.Sc, Dalhousie University; PhD, Clinical Psychology, McGill University
- Thesis: Anxiety sensitivity and risk for alcohol abuse in young adult females. (1994)

Academic work
- Institutions: Dalhousie University

Sherry Heather Stewart FRSC (born May 6, 1965) is a Canadian clinical psychologist. She is also a Professor of Psychiatry and Psychology at Dalhousie University and a Tier 1 Canada Research Chair in Addiction and Mental Health.

== Early life and education ==
Stewart was born and raised in Nova Scotia. She attended Dalhousie University to earn her Bachelor of Science degree. Following this, Stewart earned her PhD in clinical psychology from McGill University and conducted her clinical internship in Toronto.

== Career ==
Stewart joined the faculty at Dalhousie University in 1993. As a professor at Dalhousie, and registered clinical psychologist, she also ran a private clinic until 2003.

In 2004, Stewart became the coordinator of Dalhousie's doctoral training program in clinical psychology. By 2005, she was the recipient of a Social Sciences and Humanities Research Council grant for her project "Challenging dominant addiction discourse: making harm reduction work for women with alcohol use problems." The goal of the project was to examine underlying assumptions about addictions for the purpose to bettering treatment available to women. Stewart was also appointed a Killam Scholar. Two years later, she was selected to become a Board Member of the Canadian Centre on Substance Abuse (CCSA).

In 2010, Stewart was appointed Editor-in-Chief of the Journal of Gambling Studies. The next year, Stewart was honoured as a Canadian Psychological Association Fellow, as someone who made impactful contributions to the advancement of science, education and training, and/or the practice of psychology. In 2014, with a research grant from the Ontario Problem Gambling Research Centre, Stewart, Melissa J. Stewart, Sunghwan Yi, and Michael Ellery published "Predicting gambling behaviour and problems from implicit and explicit positive gambling outcome expectancies in regular gamblers." A few years later, she was appointed a Canada Research Chair in Addiction and Mental Health. In the same year, Stewart was the winner of Dalhousie's 2017 Award for Excellence in Graduate Supervision.

In 2018, Stewart was elected a Fellow of the Royal Society of Canada.
