= David M. Regan =

Canadian psychologist

David M. Regan (1935 to 26 June 2025) was a Canadian psychologist. He was a Distinguished Professor Emeritus at York University, a Fellow of the Optical Society, a Fellow of the American Academy of Optometry, a Fellow of the Royal Society of Canada, and a Fellow of the Canadian Psychological Association. From 1978 to 1983, he was York's I. W. Killam Research Professor.

Regan was elected foreign member of the Royal Netherlands Academy of Arts and Sciences in 1999. In 2003, Regan was awarded the Donald O. Hebb Award for Distinguished Contributions to Psychology as a Science from the Canadian Psychological Association.
