= Norman S. Endler =

Canadian psychologist

- Born: May 2, 1931
- Died: May 7, 2003 (aged 72)

Academic background
- Education: University of Toronto
- Thesis: Conformity analysed and related to personality (1958)

Academic work
- Discipline: Psychology
- Institutions: York University

Norman S. Endler (May 2, 1931 – May 7, 2003) was a Canadian psychologist noted for his research on stress, coping and personality.

== Career ==
Endler obtained his PhD in Psychology from the University of Toronto. He spent much of his career at York University, Ontario from which he retired as Distinguished Research Professor Emeritus.

== Awards ==
- Fellow of the Royal Society of Canada
- Fellow, American Psychological Association
- Fellow, Canadian Psychological Association

== Publications ==
- Interactional psychology and personality (Hemisphere, 1976)
- Contemporary issues in developmental psychology (with l. Boulter & H. Oser) (Holt, Rinehart and Winston, 1976)
- Personality and the Behavior Disorders (coedited with J. M. Hunt) (Wiley, 1984)
- Holiday of darkness : a psychologist's personal journey out of his depression (Wiley, 1982)
- Depression: New Directions in Theory, Research, and Practice (Wall & Emerson, 1990)
- Electroconvulsive therapy : the myths and the realities (with E. Persad) (Huber, 1988)
- Handbook of Coping: Theory, Research, Applications (with M. Zeidner) (Wiley, 1996)
