= Paul Hewitt (psychologist) =

Canadian clinical psychologist

- Education: University of Manitoba; University of Saskatchewan
- Known for: Research on perfectionism
- Awards: Canadian Psychological Association Fellow
- Scientific career
- Fields: Clinical psychology
- Institutions: University of British Columbia
- Thesis: Standard setting, standard shifts, reward, and punishment in subclinical depression (1988)
- Doctoral advisor: Richard Wollert

Dr. Paul L. Hewitt is a Canadian psychologist. He is Full Professor in the Department of Psychology, an Associate Member of the Psychotherapy Program in the Faculty of Medicine at the University of British Columbia, and a Registered Psychologist in British Columbia, Canada. He is a Fellow of the Canadian Psychological Association and of its Section on Clinical Psychology. He has won numerous awards. In 2017, Hewitt was named one of the top 10 Canadian clinical psychology professors for research productivity and, in 2019, he was awarded the Canadian Psychological Association’s Donald O. Hebb Award for Distinguished Contributions to Psychology as a Science. Dr. Hewitt is a researcher and clinician and has had a private practice since 1988 which focuses on psychodynamic/interpersonal assessment and psychotherapy for individuals experiencing difficulties from perfectionistic behavior, early trauma, depression, anxiety, personality, and interpersonal problems.

== Background ==
Dr. Hewitt completed a B.A. Honours in Psychology at the University of Manitoba, and completed his M.A. and Ph.D. in Clinical Psychology in 1984 and 1988, respectively, at the University of Saskatchewan, Saskatoon, Canada. He completed his clinical residency in the Department of Psychiatry & Behavioural Sciences in the Faculty of Medicine at the University of Washington, Seattle, U.S.A. He worked as a staff psychologist at the Brockville Psychiatric Hospital and the Faculty of Medicine, University of Ottawa between 1988 - 1991 and as an assistant and associate professor at the University of Winnipeg from 1991-1994. He joined the Department of Psychology at the University of British Columbia in 1994 where he is currently a Full Professor, a Director of Clinical Training, and an Associate Member in the Faculty of Medicine.

== Research and training ==
Dr. Hewitt is most well-known for his work on perfectionism with Dr. Gordon Flett and Dr. Samuel Mikail and has developed not only several models of perfectionism but also the treatment of perfectionism. Moreover, Dr. Hewitt, Dr. Flett, and Dr. Mikail have developed numerous clinical measures of perfectionism of the components of the perfectionism construct, including the Multidimensional Perfectionism Scale (MPS), the Perfectionistic Self Presentation Scale (PSPS), the Perfectionism Cognitions Inventory (PCI), and similar scales for use with children. These measures have been used widely in both research and clinical settings. Dr. Hewitt, his colleagues, and graduate students have conducted extensive research on the construct of perfectionism as a multidimensional and multilayered personality style, the negative outcomes of perfectionism in psychological, physical health, relationship, and achievement domains, and both the assessment and treatment of perfectionistic behavior. He, along with Dr. Samuel Mikail, developed Dynamic Relational Psychotherapy that has been evaluated and refined empirically for treatment of perfectionism and associated psychopathology. He regularly talks and conducts workshops on perfectionism and treatment internationally and the American Psychological Association has produced several published videos of Dr. Hewitt demonstrating the treatment.

Dr. Hewitt’s Perfectionism and Psychopathology Laboratory at the University of British Columbia is currently focusing on several large scale studies assessing and refining the assessment and treatment of perfectionism and addressing the development of perfectionism in children and adolescents. In addition, he is involved in many collaborative projects throughout Europe and the U.S.A dealing with various clinical issues pertaining to perfectionism and its pernicious outcomes.

== Select publications ==
=== Books ===
- Tasca, G., Mikail, S.F., & Hewitt, P. L. (2020). Group psychodynamic interpersonal psychotherapy. Washington, DC: American Psychological Association.
- Linden, W., & Hewitt, P. L. (2018). Clinical psychology: a modern health profession. New York, NY: Routledge.
- Hewitt, P. L., Flett, G. L., & Mikail, S. F. (2017). Perfectionism: A Relational Approach to Conceptualization, Assessment and Treatment. New York: Guilford Press.
- Flett, G. L., & Hewitt, P. L. (2002). Perfectionism: theory, research, and treatment. Washington, DC: American Psychological Association.

=== Research ===
- Hewitt, P. L., Chen, C., Smith, M. M., Zhang, L., Habke, M., Flett, G. L., & Mikail, S. F. (in press). Patient perfectionism and clinician impression formation during an initial Interview. Psychology and Psychotherapy: Theory, research and practice.
- Hewitt, P. L., Smith, M. M., Deng, X., Chen, C., Ko, A., Flett, G. L., & Paterson, R. J. (in press). The perniciousness of perfectionism in group therapy for depression: A test of the perfectionism social disconnection model. Psychotherapy.
- Hewitt, P. L. (2020). Perfecting, belonging, and repairing: A dynamic-relational approach to perfectionism. Canadian Psychology.
- Hewitt, P. L., Chen, C., Smith, M. M., Zhang, L., Habke, M., Flett, G. L., & Mikail, S. F. (2020). Patient perfectionism and clinician impression formation during an initial interview. Psychology and Psychotherapy: Theory, research and practice.
- Hewitt, P. L., Qiu, T., Flynn, C. A., Flett, G. L., Wiebe, S. A., Tasca, G. A., & Mikail, S. F. (2020). Dynamic-Relational Group Treatment for Perfectionism: Informant Ratings of Patient Change. Psychotherapy.
- Hewitt, P. L., Smith, M. M., Deng, X., Chen, C., Ko, A., Flett, G. L., & Paterson, R. J. (2020). The perniciousness of perfectionism in group therapy for depression: A test of the perfectionism social disconnection model. Psychotherapy.
- Lo Coco, G., Tasca, G. A., Hewitt, P. L., Mikail, S. F., Kivlighan, D. M. (2019). Ruptures and repairs of group therapy alliance. An untold story in psychotherapy research. Research in Psychotherapy: Psychopathology, Process and Outcome, 22, 58-70. (Co-author; journal impact factor=xx).
- Hewitt, P. L., Mikail, S.F., Flett, G. L., & Dang, S. (2018). Specific Formulation Feedback in Dynamic-Relational Group Psychotherapy of Perfectionism. Psychotherapy, 55, 179-185.
- Hewitt, P. L., Mikail, S. F., Flett, G. L., Tasca, G., Flynn, C.A., Deng, X., Kaldas, J., Chen, C. (2015). Psychodynamic/Interpersonal group psychotherapy of perfectionism: Evaluating a short term treatment. Psychotherapy, 52(2), 205 -217.
- Hewitt, P. L., Blasberg, J. S., Flett, G. L., Besser, Sherry, S. B., Caelian, C., Papsdorf, M., Cassels, T. G. & Birch, S. (2011). Perfectionistic self-presentation in children and adolescents: Development and validation of the Perfectionistic Self-Presentation Scale—Junior Form. Psychological Assessment, 23, 125-142.
- Hewitt, P. L., Habke, A. M., Lee-Baggley, D. L., Sherry, S. B., Flett, G. L. (2008). The impact of perfectionistic self-presentation on the cognitive, affective, and physiological experience of a clinical interview. Psychiatry: Interpersonal and Biological Processes, 71, 93- 122.
- Hewitt, P. L., Flett, G. L., Sherry, S. B., Habke, M., Parkin, M., Lam, R. W., et al. (2003). The interpersonal expression of perfectionism: Perfectionistic self-presentation and psychological distress. Journal of Personality and Social Psychology, 84, 1303-1325.
- Hewitt, P. L., Flett, G. L., & Ediger, E. (1996). Perfectionism and depression: Longitudinal assessment of a specific vulnerability hypothesis. Journal of Abnormal Psychology, 105, 276-280.
- Hewitt, P. L., & Flett, G. L. (1991). Dimensions of perfectionism in unipolar depression. Journal of Abnormal Psychology, 100, 98-101.
- Hewitt, P. L., & Flett, G. L. (1991). Perfectionism in the self and social contexts: Conceptualization, assessment, and association with psycho-pathology. Journal of Personality and Social Psychology, 60, 456-470.
