= Friedrich Heckmann =

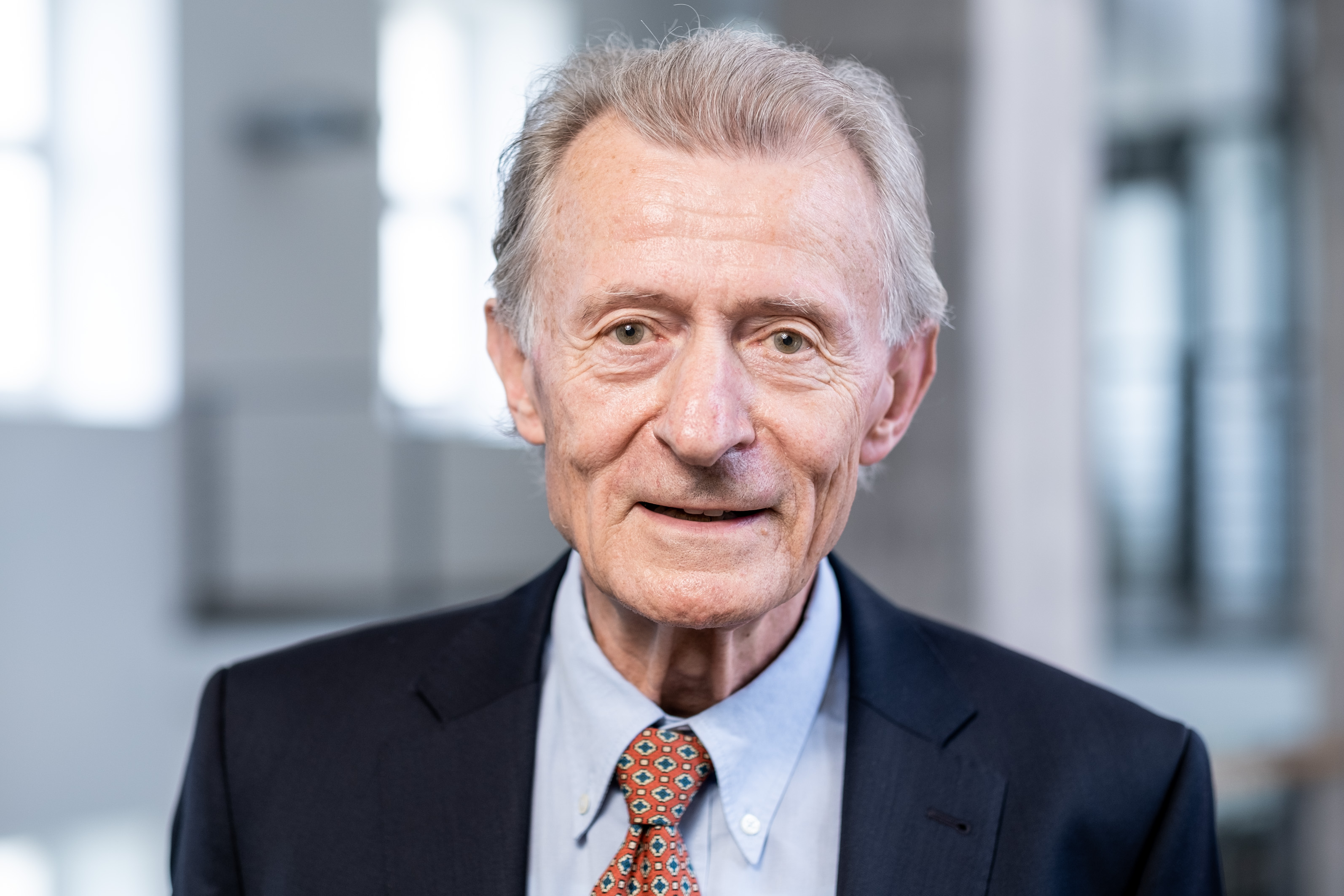
Image of Prof. Dr. Friedrich Heckmann

Friedrich Heckmann (born March 6, 1941) is the director of the research institute European Forum for Migration Studies and emeritus professor of sociology at the School of Social and Economic Sciences at the University of Bamberg. His main research, teaching and consulting interests focus on migration and social integration. Heckmann contributed significantly to the institutionalisation of migration and integration research in Germany through the launch of the research committee Migration and Ethnic Minorities (1985) within the German Sociological Society and the co-founding of the European Forum for Migration Studies in 1993 as one of the first research institutes on migration and integration in Germany. Moreover, he established migration studies in the sociology department of the University of Bamberg.

== Biography ==
Heckmann studied sociology, history and economics in Münster, Kiel, Lawrence, Kansas, United States and Erlangen-Nuremberg. His teachers included Helmut Schelsky (Münster), Gerhard Wurzbacher (Kiel; Erlangen-Nuremberg) and Gary M. Maranell (Lawrence). As a Fulbright Scholarship student, he received a Master of Arts in sociology from the State University of Kansas in Lawrence (1967). While being assistant lecturer at the University of Erlangen-Nuremberg, he earned a Ph.D. with an empirical study on socialization processes (1972). Heckmann was a project leader at the Research Centre for Social Sciences at the University of Erlangen-Nuremberg and was also a lecturer at the University of Bamberg. In 1980, he gained his habilitation at the University of Bamberg with a study on immigration in Germany. In 1982, he was appointed professor at the University of Economics and Politics in Hamburg, but returned to the University of Bamberg in 1992. Since the founding of the European Forum for Migration Studies, Heckmann has been a consultant to the German Federal Government, the European Commission, to local and municipal governments, foundation (non-profit) and civil society organizations.

== Contributions to research on migration and integration ==
Having worked within the fields of socialization, family research and history of sociology, Heckmann began to focus on migration and integration research with his habilitation (The Federal Republic: A country of immigration?, Klett-Cotta, Stuttgart, 1981). Socio-structural analysis evidenced a status of belonging of the so-called guest workers; in addition historical and internationally comparative analysis demonstrated that Germany had been transformed into a country of immigration. Conceptual and theoretical works of Heckmann contribute to a theory of minorities, to the concept of ethnic colony, to the dimensional analysis of integration processes and to the theory of prejudice as both attitude and ideology. Much of this found in his book “Ethnische Minderheiten, Volk und Nation. Soziologie inter-ethnischer Beziehungen (Enke 1992). Since the foundation of the European Forum for Migration Studies, Heckman has led numerous empirical research as well as practice-oriented projects. The form's projects mainly concern migration theory, migration statistics, migration politics, citizenship, urban and educational integration, studies on discrimination as well as evaluations of implemented policies and measures. Many projects are carried out in cooperation with other European institutions and organizations.

== Selected bibliography ==
=== Works available in English ===
- Migration Policies: a Comparative Perspective. With a foreword by Richard v. Weizsäcker. Editor and author with Wolfgang Bosswick. Enke: Stuttgart 1995
- The Integration of Immigrants in European Societies. National Differences and Trends of Convergence. Editor and author with Dominique Schnapper. Lucius und Lucius: Stuttgart 2003
- Intercultural Policies in European Cities, with Doris Lüken-Klaßen. European Union Foundation: Dublin 2010

=== Works available in German ===
- Die Bundesrepublik: ein Einwanderungsland? Zur Soziologie der Gastarbeiterbevölkerung als Einwandererminorität. Klett-Cotta: Stuttgart 1981
- Einführung in die Geschichte der Soziologie, mit Friedhelm Kröll. Enke: Stuttgart 1984
- Ethnische Minderheiten, Volk und Nation. Soziologie inter-ethnischer Beziehungen. Enke: Stuttgart 1992
- Freizügigkeit in Europa. Migrations- und europapolitsche Aspekte des Schengen Vertrags. Herausgeber mit Veronica Tomei. Europa Union Verlag: Bonn 1995

== See also ==
- Ethnic minorities
- Integration
- History of sociology
- Human migration
- Socialisation
