= John W. Berry (psychologist) =

Canadian psychologist (born 1939)

John Widdup Berry
- Born: John Widdup Berry; May 19, 1939 (age 87); Montreal, Canada
- Citizenship: Canadian
- Occupation: Professor
- Awards: Fellow of the Royal Society of Canada

Academic background
- Education: Sir George Williams University; University of Edinburgh
- Thesis: Cultural determinants of perception (1966)

Academic work
- Discipline: Psychology
- Sub-discipline: Cross-cultural psychology
- Institutions: University of Sydney; Queen's University at Kingston; HSE University

John Widdup Berry is a psychologist known for his work in two areas: ecological and cultural influences on behavior; and the adaptation of immigrants and indigenous peoples following intercultural contact. The first is broadly in the domain of cross-cultural psychology; the second is in the domain of intercultural psychology.

== Education and career ==
Berry was born in Montreal in 1939. He graduated from the local Sir George Williams University (now Concordia University) in 1963. He moved to Scotland and obtained his PhD from the University of Edinburgh in 1966.

He then worked briefly at the University of Sydney before returning to Canada in 1969. He spent most of his academic career at Queen's University at Kingston, Canada from which he retired as Emeritus Professor of Psychology in 1999.

Since retiring in 1999, he has taken short-term teaching and research appointments in many countries (including in Australia, China, Estonia, France, India, Ireland, Japan, Mexico, New Zealand, Norway, Sri Lanka, Sweden and the United Kingdom). He has been Chief Research Fellow at the National Research University Higher School of Economics, Moscow, Russia working on projects dealing with intercultural relations and cultural identities in Russia and in former Soviet republics.

== Three research areas ==
=== Cross-cultural psychology ===
His first area of research examines how cultural groups and their individual members adapt their customs and behaviours to the ecological contexts in which they have developed and now live. This perspective has been captured in his development of the ecocultural perspective, which seeks to explain how individuals develop and acquire their behavioural repertoire in various ecological contexts and cultures. This perspective links the habitat of a cultural group to their social institutions and practices (such as their settlement style, social stratification, and socialisation practices), and thence to the development of a variety of behaviours of individual members of these cultural groups (including perception, cognition, and social behaviours). The focus of much of this research has been with indigenous peoples in Africa, the Arctic, and Asia, contrasting groups with hunting, agricultural, and urban life styles. He has published research books on this topic between 1976 and 2017. In carrying out this work, the use of the comparative method has been central. This method has required the development of the concepts of imposed etic, emic, and derived etic as ways to identify the methods used when making cross-cultural comparisons.

=== Intercultural psychology ===
He has examined the psychology of acculturation and intercultural relations, and has developed the concepts of acculturation strategies and acculturative stress. The concept of acculturation strategies refers to some different ways for how groups and individuals seek to live together, using the four concepts of integration (engaging both cultures), assimilation or separation (engaging only one or the other culture), and marginalisation (engaging neither culture). The outcomes of these ways of intercultural living have been described in terms of three forms of adaptation: psychological wellbeing; sociocultural competence; and intercultural relations. The concept of acculturative stress was developed as an alternative to culture shock; this concept uses the stress, coping and adaptation framework to describe the challenges encountered during the acculturation process. He has published research books dealing with these issues between 1977 and 2017. He is much involved in the application of research findings in both of these areas to the development of policies and programmes in the domains of education, immigration, multiculturalism and wellbeing.

=== Consolidation of these fields ===
He has sought to integrate and consolidate both cross-cultural and intercultural psychology by participating in the production of textbooks (between 1990 and 2011) and handbooks (between 1980 and 2016). Some of these have been translated into Chinese, Greek, Indonesian, Italian, Japanese, Korean, Russian, and Turkish. Most recently he has co-edited a 4 volume compendium of classic and current articles in cross-cultural psychology (2017).

In addition to these books, with colleagues he has published over 120 journal articles, 30 books and 200 book chapters. For this work he is highly cited in the literature, with over 140,000 citations, and an h index of 128 on Google Scholar. He continues to publish.

His biographies appear in Who's Who in Canada, and Who's Who in America, and Who's Who in the World.

== Honours and awards ==
- 2022: Gold Medal Award For Distinguished Lifetime Contributions to Canadian Psychology, Canadian Psychological Association
- 2021: Fellow of the Royal Society of Canada
- 2012: Award for Contributions to the Advancement of International Psychology, Canadian Psychological Association
- 2005: Lifetime Achievement Award, International Academy for Intercultural Research (IAIR)
- 2001: Honorary Doctorate, University of Athens
- 2001: Honorary Doctorate, University of Geneva
- Honorary Life Fellow, Canadian Psychological Association
- Fellow, International Association for Cross-Cultural Psychology
- Fellow, International Academy for Intercultural Research
- Fellow, International Association of Applied Psychology
- 1999: Prize for Contributions to Psychology in the Americas, Interamerican Psychological Society
- 1998: Donald O. Hebb Award for Contributions to Psychology as a Science, Canadian Psychological Association

== Selected books ==
=== Cross-cultural psychology ===
- Berry, J.W. (1976). Human Ecology and Cognitive Style: Comparative Studies in Cultural and Psychological Adaptation. New York: Sage/Halsted.
- Berry, J.W., van de Koppel, J.M.H., Sénéchal, C., Annis, R.C., Bahuchet, S., Cavalli-Sforza, L.L., and & Witkin, H.A. (1986). On the Edge of the Forest: Cultural Adaptation and Cognitive Development in Central Africa. Lisse: Swets and Zeitlinger.
- Mishra, R.C., Sinha, D. & Berry, J.W. (1996) Ecology, Acculturation and Psychological Adaptation: A study of Adivasi in Bihar. New Delhi: Sage.
- Georgas, J., Berry, J.W., van de Vijver, Kagitcibasi, C., & Poortinga, Y.H. (Eds.) (2006). Family Structure and Function: A 30 nation psychological Study. Cambridge: Cambridge University Press.
- Mishra, R.C. & Berry, J.W. (2017). Ecology, Culture and Human Development: Lessons for Adivasi Education. New Delhi: Sage

=== Intercultural psychology ===
- Berry, J.W., Kalin, R., and & Taylor, D. (1977). Multiculturalism and Ethnic Attitudes in Canada. Ottawa: Ministry of Supply and Services.
- Berry, J.W., Phinney, J.S, Sam, D.L. & Vedder, P. (Eds.) (2006). Immigrant Youth in Cultural Transition: Acculturation, Identity and Adaptation Across National Contexts. Mahwah: Lawrence Erlbaum Associates.
- Sam, D.L. & Berry, J.W. (Eds) (2006/2016). Cambridge handbook of acculturation psychology (1st and 2nd editions). Cambridge: Cambridge University Press.
- Berry, J.W. (2017). Mutual Intercultural Relations. Cambridge: Cambridge University Press.
- Berry, J.W. (2019). Acculturation: A personal journey across cultures. Cambridge: Cambridge University Press.

=== Consolidations of the fields ===
- Triandis, H.C., and & Berry, J.W. (Eds.) (1980). Handbook of Cross-Cultural Psychology, Vol. 2, Methodology, Boston: Allyn & Bacon.
- Segall, M.H., Dasen, P.R., Berry, J.W., and & Poortinga, Y.H. (1990/1999). Human Behavior in Global Perspective: An Introduction to Cross-Cultural Psychology. (1^{st}and 2nd editions). New York: Pergamon.
- Berry, J.W., Poortinga, Y.H., Segall, M.H. and & Dasen, P.R. (1992/2002). Cross-Cultural Psychology: Research and Applications. (1st and 2nd editions). New York: Cambridge University Press
- Berry, J.W., Poortinga, Y.H., Breugelmans, S.M., Chasiotis, A. & Sam, D.L. (2011). Cross-cultural psychology: Research and Applications. (3rd edition). Cambridge: Cambridge University Press.
- Berry, J.W., Poortinga, Y.H. & Pandey, J. (Eds) (1997). Handbook of Cross-Cultural Psychology. Vol.1, Theory and Method. Boston: Allyn & Bacon.
- Berry, J.W., Dasen, P.R. & Saraswathi, T.S. (Eds) (1997). Handbook of Cross-Cultural Psychology. Vol. 2, Basic Processes and Human Development. Boston: Allyn & Bacon.
- Berry, J.W., Segall, M.H. & Kagicibasi, C. (Eds) (1997). Handbook of Cross-Cultural Psychology. Vol. 3, Social Behaviour and Applications. Boston: Allyn & Bacon.
- Sam, D.L. & Berry, J.W. (Eds) (2017). Cross-Cultural Psychology (4 volumes). London: Routledge.
