= David A. Wolfe =

Canadian psychologist and author (born 1951)

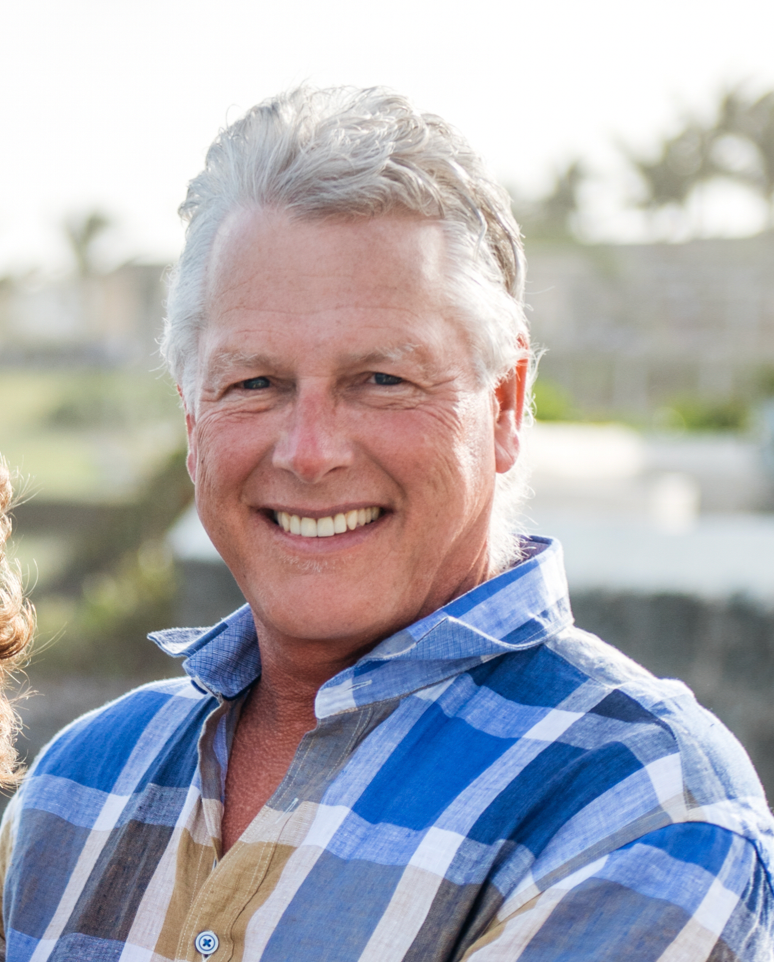
- Wolfe in 2017
- Born: August 5, 1951 (age 75)
- Education: B.A. University of Rochester 1973; M.A., Ph.D. University of South Florida 1980
- Medical career
- Field: Psychology
- Institutions: Western University; Centre for Addiction and Mental Health, University of Toronto
- Research: Child abuse; dating violence; sexual abuse; school based healthy relationships

David Allen Wolfe (born August 5, 1951) is an academic, psychologist and author specializing in issues of child abuse, domestic violence, children and youth. His work includes the promotion of healthy relationships through school programs, with a major focus on the prevention of child abuse and neglect, bullying, dating violence, unsafe sex, substance abuse and other consequences of unhealthy relationships.

== Early life and education ==
Wolfe is the son of a teacher and minister, born in Greensburg, Pennsylvania and growing up in Missouri, Connecticut, and Florida. Wolfe earned a Bachelor of Arts from the University of Rochester in Rochester, New York in 1973, and a PhD in clinical psychology from the University of South Florida in 1980. After his residency in Clinical psychology at the University of Mississippi Medical Center, Wolfe moved to Canada to pursue his career focus on child abuse and domestic violence with an emphasis on prevention. He took postdoctoral training for Child Trauma research at the Medical University of South Carolina in 1985. Wolfe joined the faculty in the Department of Psychology at the University of Western Ontario in London, Ontario, Canada in 1981 where he conducted research in the field of child abuse. He married Barbara Legate in 1989, a personal injury litigator.

== Awards and achievements ==
Wolfe is an elected Fellow of the Royal Society of Canada and professor emeritus at Western University in London, Canada. He is ranked 62 in Canada and 1188 worldwide in Psychology, with a D-index of 76. He held the inaugural chair in Children's Mental Health at the Centre for Addiction and Mental Health, and headed the CAMH Centre for Prevention Science from 2002 to 2016. He was Professor of Psychiatry and Psychology at the University of Toronto from 2002 to 2016. He served as editor-in-chief of Child Abuse & Neglect: The International Journal from 2007 to 2013. He is a fellow of the American Psychological Association, past President of Division 37 (Child, Youth, and Family Services) of the American Psychological Association, and received a Diplomate in Clinical Psychology from the American Board of Professional Psychology. Wolfe received the Award of Merit from the Ontario Psychological Association in 1988 for his outstanding contributions to research and prevention in the area of family violence. He has provided extensive assessment and consultation to child protective services, schools, and the court with respect to issues of child abuse and violence. Between 1999 and 2000 he was the chair in the Sub-Committee on Child Abuse in Peacetime for the International Working Group on Trauma, United Nations.

In 2005, Wolfe received the Donald O. Hebb Award for Distinguished Contributions to Psychology as a Science from the Canadian Psychological Association. He was also presented with the 2007 Blanche L. Ittleson Award for Outstanding Achievement in the Delivery of Children's Services and the Promotion of Children's Mental Health from the American Orthopsychiatric Association. His recent books include Adolescent Risk Behaviors: Why teens experiment and strategies to keep them safe (with P. Jaffe & C. Crooks; Yale University Press, 2006); Child abuse: Implications for child development and psychopathology, 2nd Edition (Sage, 1999); and Abnormal Child Psychology, 8th edition (with E. Mash; Wadsworth, 2021).

Wolfe is a founding member of the Center for Research & Education on Violence Against Women and Children at the University of Western Ontario, where he and colleague Peter Jaffe coined the term "Children of Battered Women" and "Children Exposed to Domestic Violence", now used widely within the mental health and justice systems. He recently published an updated book in this area (with P. Jaffe and M. Campbell - Growing Up with Domestic Violence: Assessment, Intervention & Prevention Strategies for Children & Adolescents).

His expertise in the field of child and adolescent psychology has led him to testify as an expert in multiple cases, including the high-profile case of sexual abuse at Mount Cashel Orphanage in Newfoundland run by The Christian Brothers of Ireland in Canada. Wolfe also provided expert evidence for the Cornwall Public Inquiry into historical sexual abuse in that community. He is cited extensively by Judge Normand Glaude in the inquiry report as one of the leading experts in child sexual abuse.

== Studies and projects ==
Wolfe's main interest lies in violence prevention among youth and families, based on his research with colleagues demonstrating the harmful impact of multiple forms of abuse on children, including exposure to domestic violence.

Wolfe's interest in violence prevention has culminated into a comprehensive school-based initiative for reducing violence amongst adolescents and related risk behaviors, known as "The Fourth R: Skills for Youth Relationships." It was identified as a top evidence-based program for school-based violence prevention by the New Jersey–based Robert Wood Johnson Foundation where it was implemented in several US sites as a part of their Start Strong violence-prevention initiative

A cluster randomized trial evaluation of "The Fourth R" program in Ontario, Canada found that teaching youths about healthy relationships as part of their required health curriculum reduced physical dating violence and increased condom use 2.5 years later at a low per-student cost. These results were replicated in a 2021 cluster randomized trial in Texas. A discussion of the program can be heard in a podcast interview conducted by the California Coalition Against Sexual Assault and Peace Talks radio
