= Patrick McGrath (psychologist) =

Canadian psychologist

Patrick J. McGrath
- Born: 1948 (age 77–78); Ottawa
- Education: University of Saskatchewan; Queen's University at Kingston
- Awards: Officer of the Order of Canada; Fellow of the Royal Society of Canada;Fellow of the Canadian Academy of Health Sciences
- Scientific career
- Fields: Clinical psychology; pediatric psychology
- Workplaces: Dalhousie University; IWK Health Centre Royal Ottawa Institute for Mental Health Research
- Thesis: The measurement of social inadequacy (1979)
- Doctoral advisor: Ray Peters

Patrick J. McGrath, OC, FRSC FCAHS is a Canadian psychologist noted for his contribution to research on childhood pain and virtual delivery of health care.

== Biography ==
Patrick McGrath was born in Ottawa and initially attended the University of Ottawa but transferred to the University of Saskatchewan where he completed his BA and MA in Psychology. He subsequently obtained his PhD in psychology from Queen's University at Kingston. His first post was a clinical post in the Children's Hospital of Eastern Ontario in Ottawa. It was there that he became interested in childhood pain. He then transferred to Dalhousie University in Halifax, Nova Scotia to establish the PhD programme in clinical psychology. It was here that he established the Centre for Pediatric Pain Research and the Centre for Family Health Research. He "retired" from that institution as emeritus professor of psychiatry but continues to do research and has a small clinical practice. He is also a Senior Scientist at the Royal's Institute of Mental Health Research in Ottawa.

== Research ==
He has published extensively in the area of pediatric pain and on the virtual delivery of psychological care. He has published hundreds of peer-reviewed articles and his Google Scholar h index is over 150 with over 57,000 citations.

== Administrative experience ==
He was on the Governing Council of the Canadian Institutes of Health Research for 7 years (2004-2011) and was Integrated Vice President Research, Innovation and Knowledge Translation at the IWK Health Centre and the Nova Scotia Health Authority for a decade until September 2017. He is a founder and was chairman of the board of the Strongest Families Institute which delivers mental health care to families who have children with mental health problems. He serves on the Board of the Royal Ottawa Health Care Centre

== Honours and awards ==
- 1972-73: R.S. McLaughlin Fellowship, Queen's University at Kingston
- 1973-74: Canada Council, Doctoral Fellowship
- 1982-89: Career Scientist Award, Ontario Ministry of Health
- 1988 : Fellow, Canadian Psychological Association
- 1988 : Book of the Year Award, awarded by the American Journal of Nursing for Pain in Children and Adolescents.
- 1993-98: Bristol-Myers Squibb Unrestricted Research Award and Grant Holder
- 1995 : Canadian Psychological Association Award for Distinguished Contribution to Canadian Psychology as a Profession
- 1995 : Fellow, Royal Society of Canada
- 1995 : Co-author of paper winning the Best Paper of the International Meeting on Pediatric Pain, Atlanta
- 1997 : Co-author of paper winning the Best Paper of the meeting at the American Association for the Study of Headache, New York
- 1998-2003: Distinguished Scientist Award, Medical Research Council of Canada (now Canadian Institutes of Health Research
- 1999 : Research Award, IWK Health Centre
- 1999 : Fellow, Canadian Psychological Association, Clinical Division
- 1999 : Interview included in the John C. Liebskind History of Pain Collection UCLA
- 2000 : Zubeck Lecturer, University of Manitoba
- 2001 : Wilbert E. Fordyce Clinical Investigator Award, American Pain Society
- 2001 : Canadian Pain Society, Distinguished Career Award
- 2001-2005: Killam Professor, Dalhousie University
- 2001 : Supervisor of and co-author with CIHR, Brain Star, Lynn Breau
- 2002 : Cecil and Ida Green Visiting professor, University of British Columbia
- 2002-09: Canada Research Chair: Pediatric Pain
- 2003 : Order of Canada (Officer)
- 2004 : Martin P. Levin Mentorship Award of the Society of Pediatric Psychology, American Psychological Association
- 2004 : Inaugural Patrick Wall Lecturer, New Zealand Pain Society,
- 2004 : Distinguished Service Award, Faculty of Graduate Studies, Dalhousie University
- 2005 : Fellow, Canadian Academy of Health Sciences
- 2006 : Donald O. Hebb Award for Distinguished Contributions to Psychology as a Science, Canadian Psychological Association
- 2007 : A top producer of Scholarly Publications see: Stewart, PK, Wu, YP & Roberts, MC, Top Producers of Scholarly Publications in Clinical Psychology PhD Programs. J Clin Psychol 63: 1209–1215, 2007.
- 2009 : Jeffrey Lawson Award for Advocacy in Children's Pain Relief. American Pain Society
- 2009 : Invited Master Researcher/Clinician, American Psychological Association Convention, August
- 2009-16: Canada Research Chair in Child Health (renewal)
- 2010 : Mayday Outstanding Contributor's Award, International Association for the Study of Pain, Special Interest Group on Pain in Children.
- 2010 : Logan Wright Distinguished Research Award, Division 54 (Society of Pediatric Psychology) American Psychological Association
- 2013 : Manning Principal Award for best innovation in Canada for Strongest Families 9with Patricia Lingley Pottie)
- 2013 : Initial winner of the Pat Award for Mentorship of the International Forum for Pediatric Pain
- 2016 : Legacy of Leadership Award, HealthCareCAN
- 2017 : Governor General's Award for Innovation for Strongest Families (with Patricia Lingley-Pottie)
- 2017 : Difference Makers Award of the Centre for Mental Health and Addiction

== Books ==
- McGrath, P.J. & Firestone, P. (Eds.). (1983). Pediatric and adolescent behavioral medicine: Issues in treatment. New York: Springer.
- Firestone, P., McGrath, P. & Feldman, W. (Eds.). (1983). Advances in behavioral medicine for children and adolescents. Hillsdale, New Jersey: Lawrence Erlbaum Associates.
- Feldman, W., Rosser, W. & McGrath, P. (1987). Primary medical care of children and adolescents. Oxford University Press.
- McGrath, P. & Unruh, A. (1987). Pain in children and adolescents. Amsterdam: Elsevier. Published in hardcover and softcover editions.
- Anand, K.J.S. & McGrath, P.J. (Eds.). (1993). Pain in Neonates. Amsterdam: Elsevier. Also available in paperback.
- Finley, G.A. & McGrath, P.J. (Eds.) (1998). Measurement of pain in infants and children. Seattle: IASP Press.
- WHO working group (P.J. McGrath and 21 others). (1998). Cancer Pain Relief and Palliative Care in Children. Geneva, WHO.
- McGrath, P.J. & Finley, G.A. (Eds.) (1999) Chronic and recurrent pain in children and adolescents. Seattle: IASP Press
- Anand, K.J.S., Stevens, B. & McGrath, P.J. (Eds.) (2000). Pain in Neonates, 2nd edition, Amsterdam, Elsevier
- Finley, G.A. & McGrath, P.J. (Eds.) (2001) Acute and procedure pain in infants and children. Seattle, IASP Press.
- McGrath, P.J. & Finley, G.A. (eds.) (2003) Pediatric Pain: Biological and Social Context. Seattle, IASP Press
- Finley GA, McGrath PJ, Chambers CT (eds.).(2006). Bringing Pain Relief to Children. Totowa, NJ: Humana Press.
- Anand, KJS, Stevens B, and McGrath PJ (eds.) (2007) Pain in Neonates and Infants (3rd ed). Elsevier, New York
- McGrath, PJ, Stevens, BJ, Walker, SM and William T. Zempsky, WT, (eds) Oxford Textbook of Paediatric Pain, Oxford
