= Journal of Gambling Studies =

- Subject: Gambling
- Language: English
- Edited by: Jon Grant

Publication details
- Former name(s): Journal of Gambling Behavior
- History: 1985–present
- Publisher: Springer Science+Business Media
- Frequency: Quarterly
- Impact factor: 2.4 (2022)

Standard abbreviations
- ISO 4: J. Gambl. Stud.

Indexing
- CODEN: JGSTEM
- ISSN: 1050-5350 (print); 1573-3602 (web)
- LCCN: 2001252152
- OCLC no.: 299333735

Links
- Journal homepage; Online archive

The Journal of Gambling Studies is a quarterly peer-reviewed journal covering all aspects of gambling with an emphasis on gambling disorder. The first academic journal focused on gambling, it was established in 1985 as the Journal of Gambling Behavior, obtaining its current name in 1990. It is published by Springer Science+Business Media and the editor-in-chief is James P. Whelan (University of Memphis). Previous editors were Henry R. Lesieur (1985 to 1996), Howard J. Shaffer (1997 to 2002) and Jon E. Grant (2003 to 2025). According to the Journal Citation Reports, the journal has an impact factor of 2.4 for 2022 and a five year impact factor (2022) of 2.9.
