= List of McGill University people =

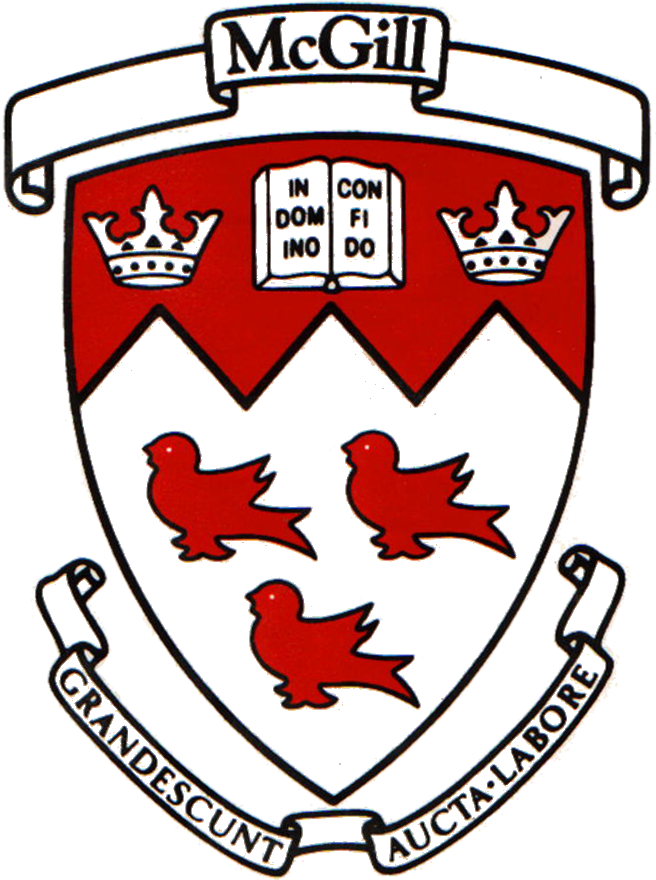
McGill University's coat of arms

The following is a list of chancellors, principals, and noted alumni and professors of McGill University in Montreal, Quebec, Canada.

== List of chancellors ==
1. Charles Dewey Day (1864–1884)
2. James Ferrier (1884–1888)
3. Sir Donald Alexander Smith, Lord Strathcona (1889–1914)
4. Sir William Christopher Macdonald (1914–1917)
5. Sir Robert Laird Borden (1918–1920)
6. Sir Edward Wentworth Beatty (1921–1942)
7. Morris Watson Wilson (1943–1946)
8. Orville Sievwright Tyndale (BA 1908, MA 1909, BCL 1915) (1946–1952)
9. Bertie Charles Gardner (1952–1957)
10. Ray Edwin Powell (1957–1964)
11. Howard Irwin Ross (BA 1930) (1964–1970)
12. Donald Olding Hebb (MA, 1932) (1970–1974)
13. Stuart Milner Finlayson (1975)
14. Conrad Fetherstonhaugh Harrington (BA 1933, BCL 1936) (1976–1984)
15. A. Jean de Grandpré (BCL 1943) (1984–1991)
16. Gretta Chambers (BA 1947) (1991–1999)
17. Richard W. Pound (BCom 1962, LAcc 1964, BCL 1967) (1999–2009)
18. H. Arnold Steinberg (BCom 1954) (2009–2014)
19. Michael A. Meighen (BA 1960) (2014–2021)
20. John McCall MacBain (2021–2024)
21. Pierre Boivin (2024–present)

== List of principals/president ==
1. George Jehoshaphat Mountain (1824–1835)
2. John Bethune (1835–1846)
3. Edmund Allen Meredith (1846–1853)
4. Charles Dewey Day (1854–1855)
5. Sir John William Dawson (1855–1893)
6. Sir William Peterson (1895–1919)
7. Sir Auckland Campbell Geddes (1919–1920)
8. General Sir Arthur Currie (1920–1933)
9. Arthur Eustace Morgan (1935–1937)
10. Lewis Williams Douglas (1938–1939)
11. Frank Cyril James (1939–1962)
12. Harold Rocke Robertson (BSc 1932, MD 1936) (1962–1970)
13. Robert Edward Bell (PhD 1948) (1970–1979)
14. David Lloyd Johnston (1979–1994)
15. Bernard Shapiro (BA 1956) (1994–2002)
16. Heather Munroe-Blum (2003–2013)
17. Suzanne Fortier (BSc 1972, PhD 1976) (2013–2022)
18. H. Deep Saini (2023–present)

== Noted alumni and professors ==
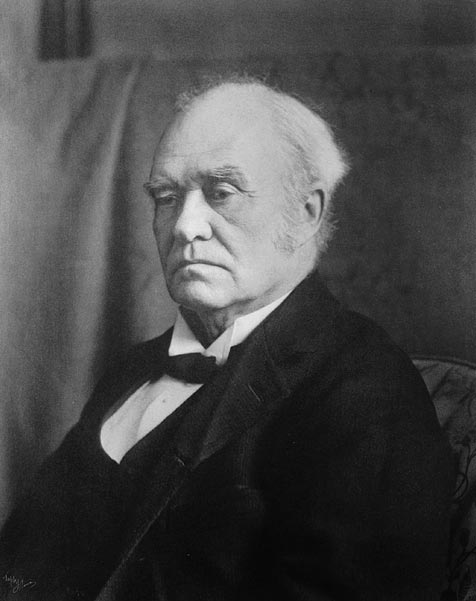
Sir John Abbott, 3rd Prime Minister of Canada

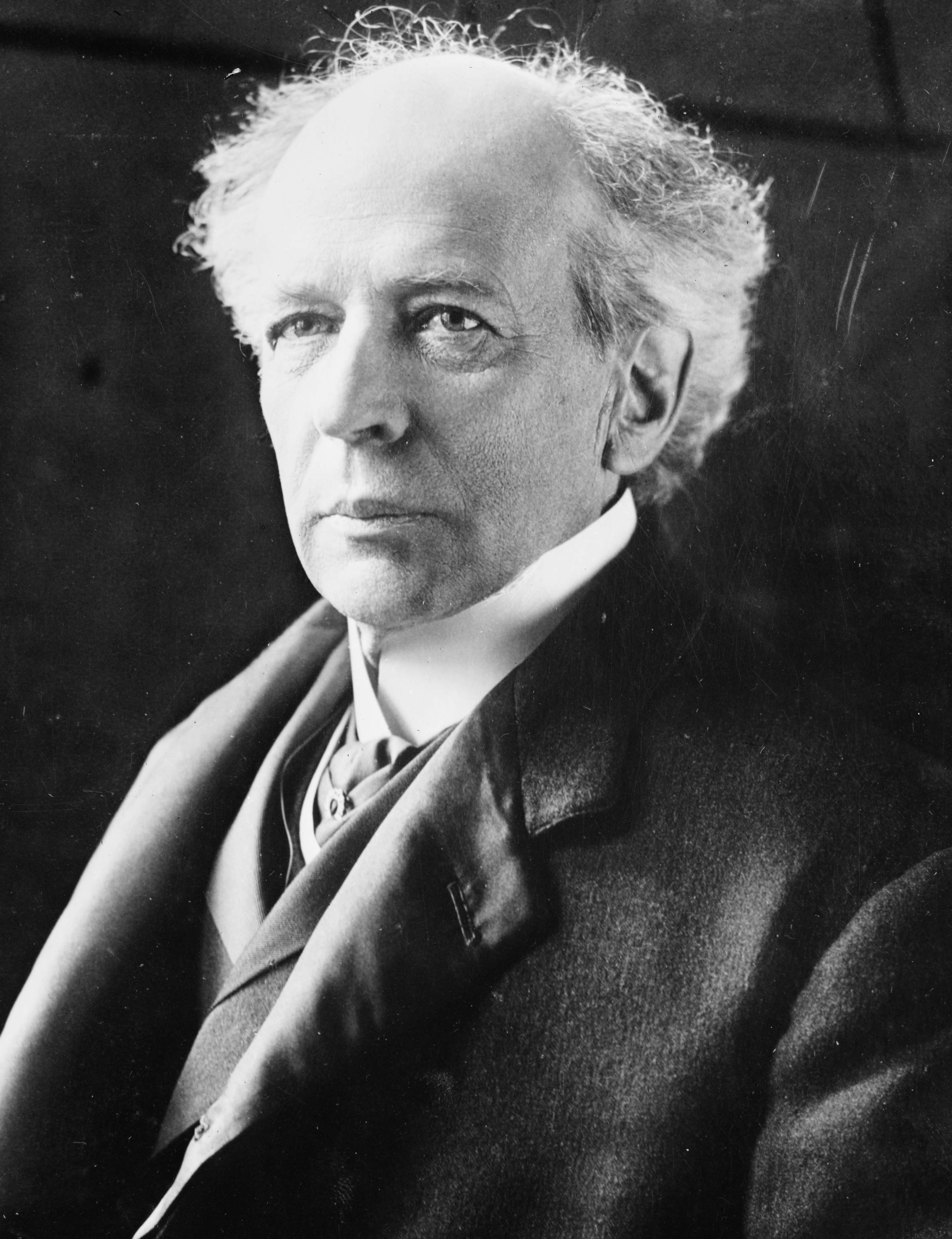
Sir Wilfrid Laurier, 7th Prime Minister of Canada

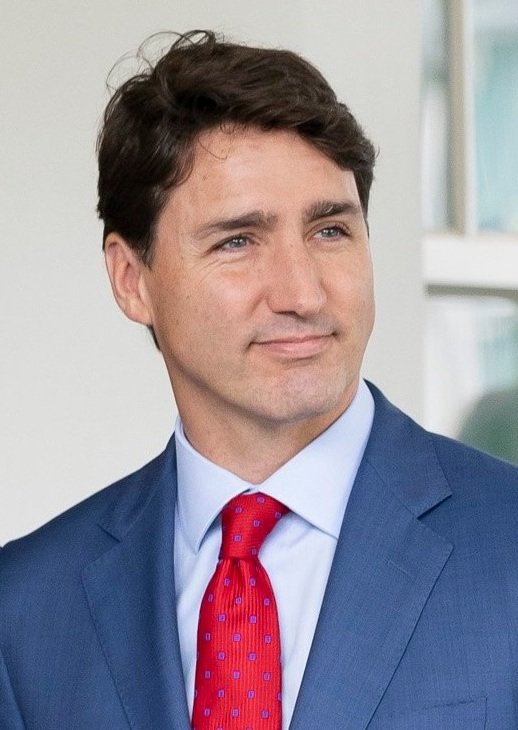
Justin Trudeau, 23rd and former Prime Minister of Canada

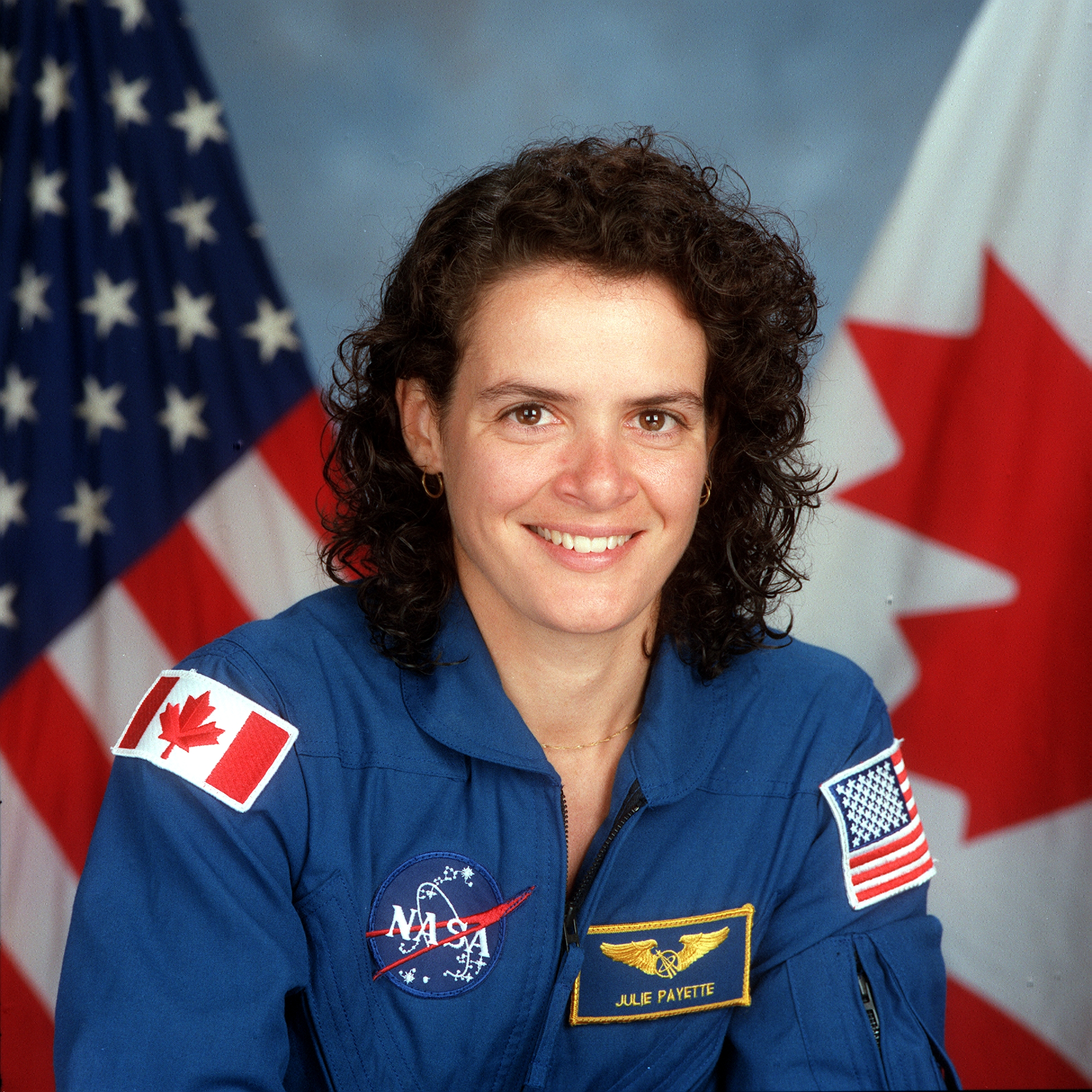
Julie Payette, astronaut and former Governor General of Canada

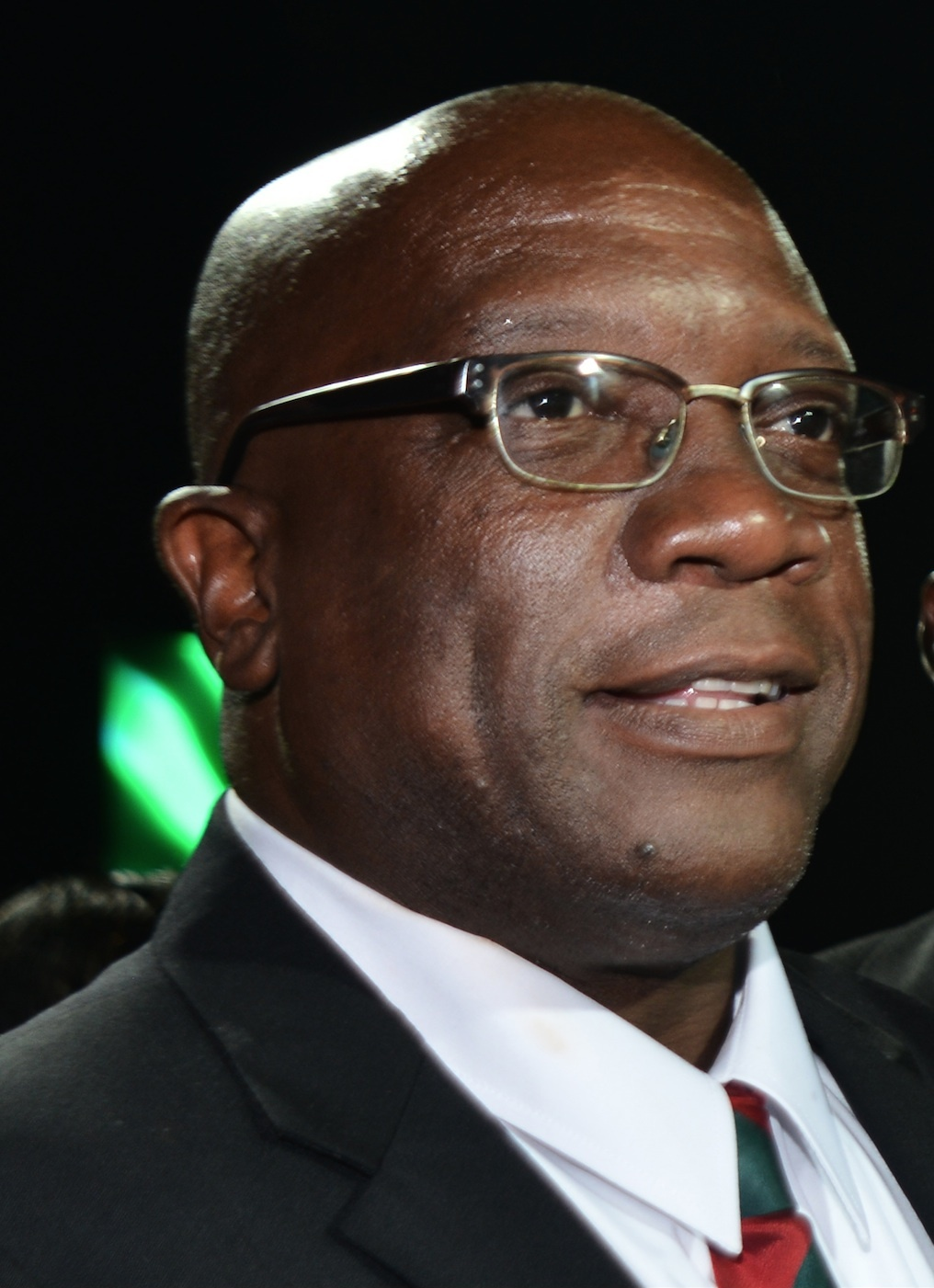
Timothy Harris, current Prime Minister of Saint Kitts and Nevis

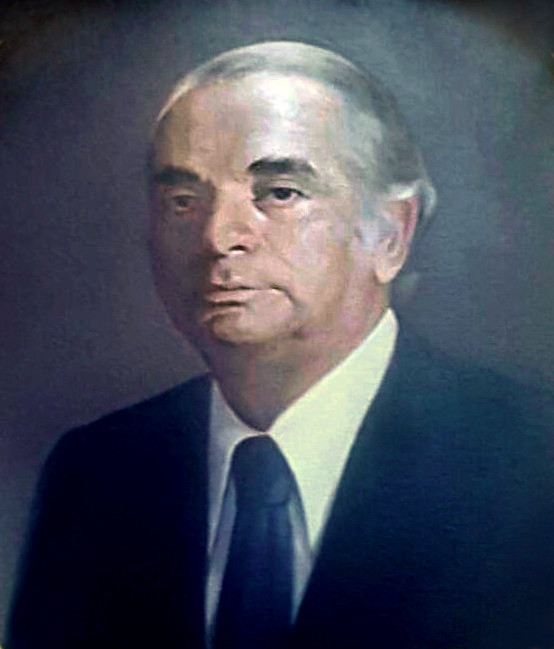
Daniel Oduber Quirós, 37th President of Costa Rica

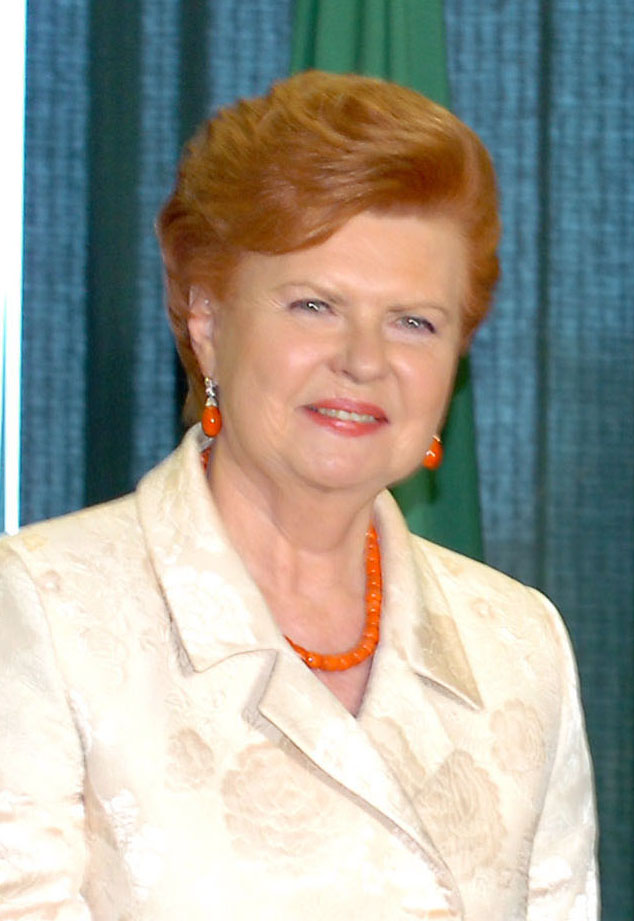
Vaira Vike-Freiberga, 6th and first female President of Latvia

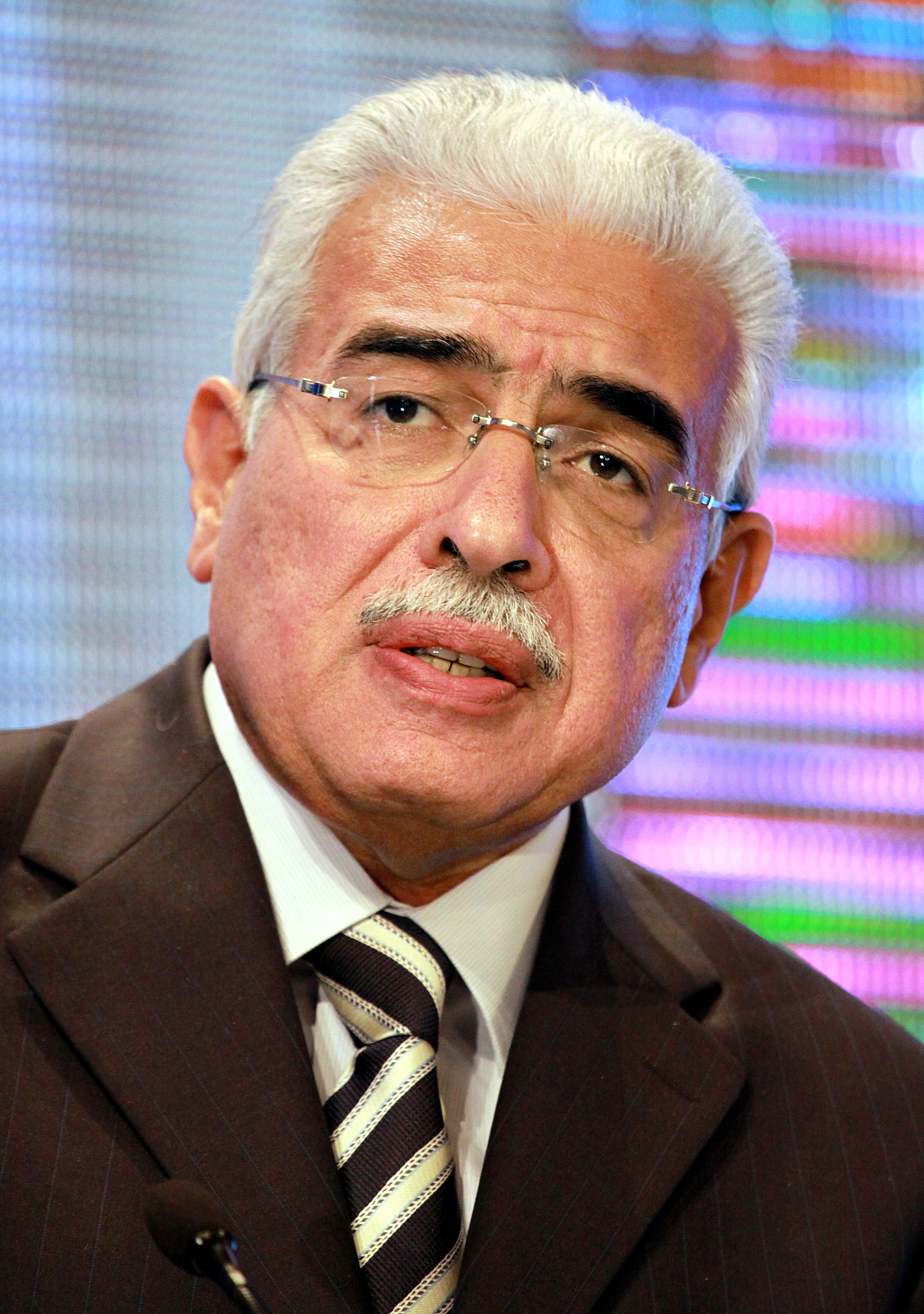
Ahmed Nazif, 48th Prime Minister of Egypt

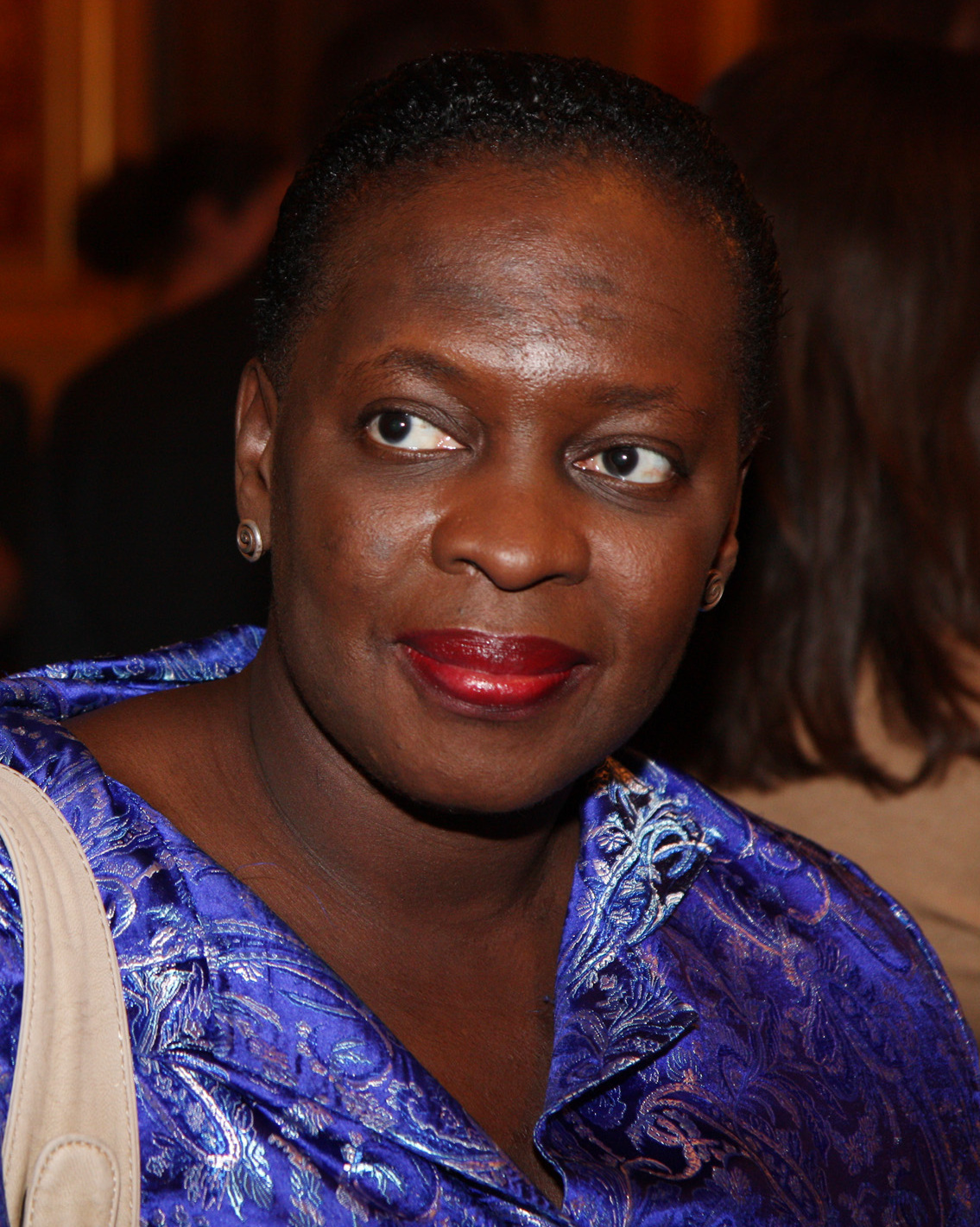
Paula Ann Cox, 10th Prime Minister of Bermuda

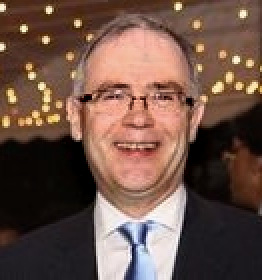
John Rankin, former Governor-General of Bermuda, the 143rd

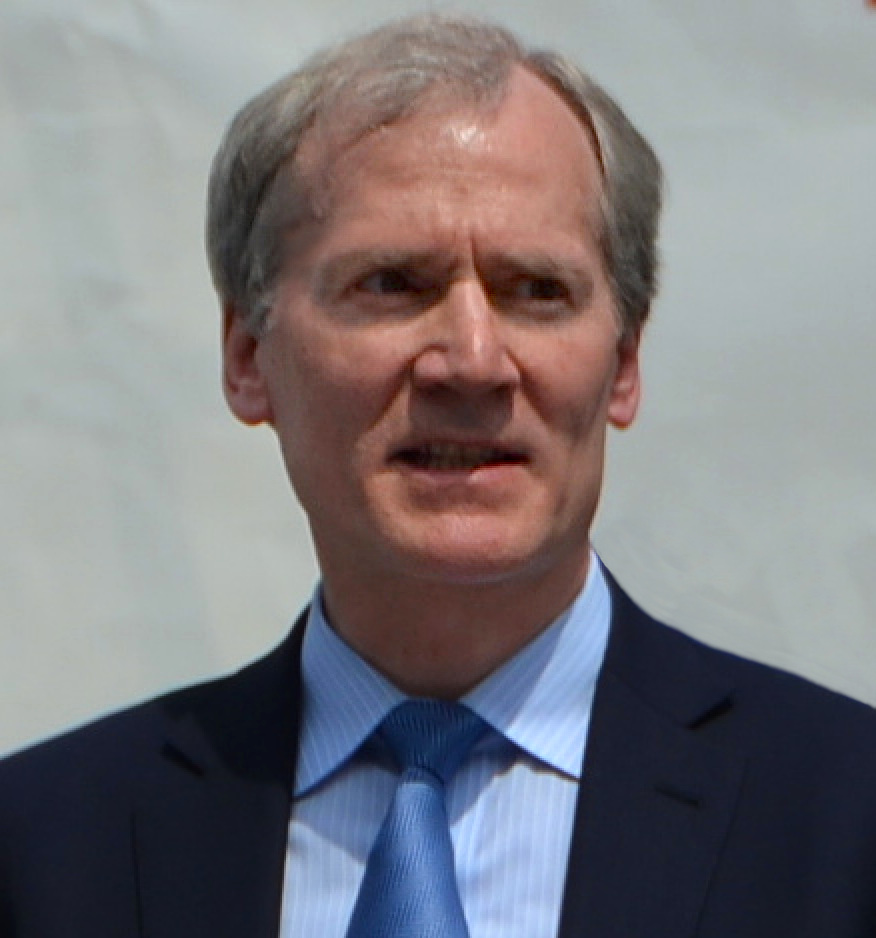
Marc Tessier-Lavigne, neuroscientist and 11th President of Stanford University

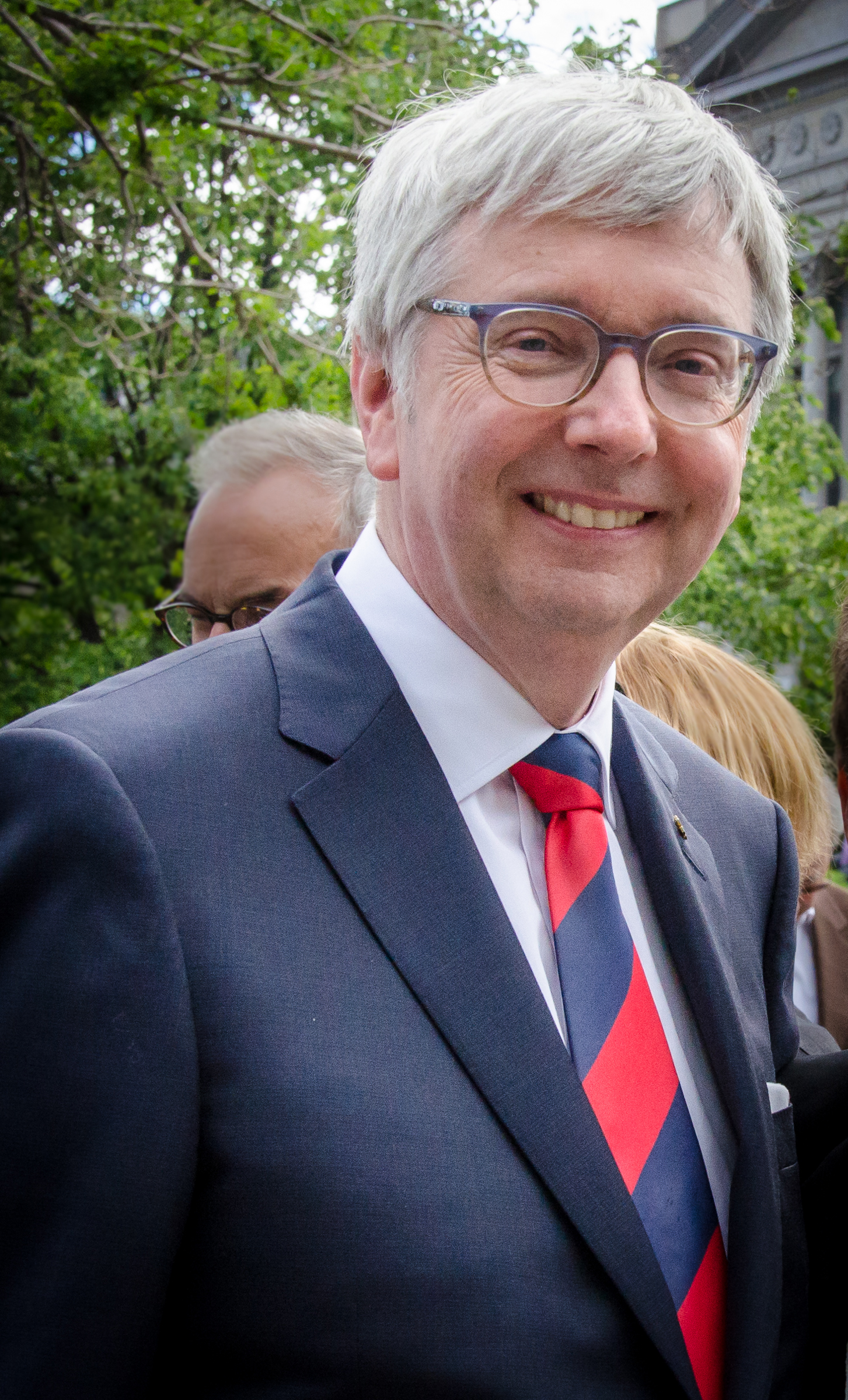
Stephen Toope, legal scholar and current President of the University of Cambridge

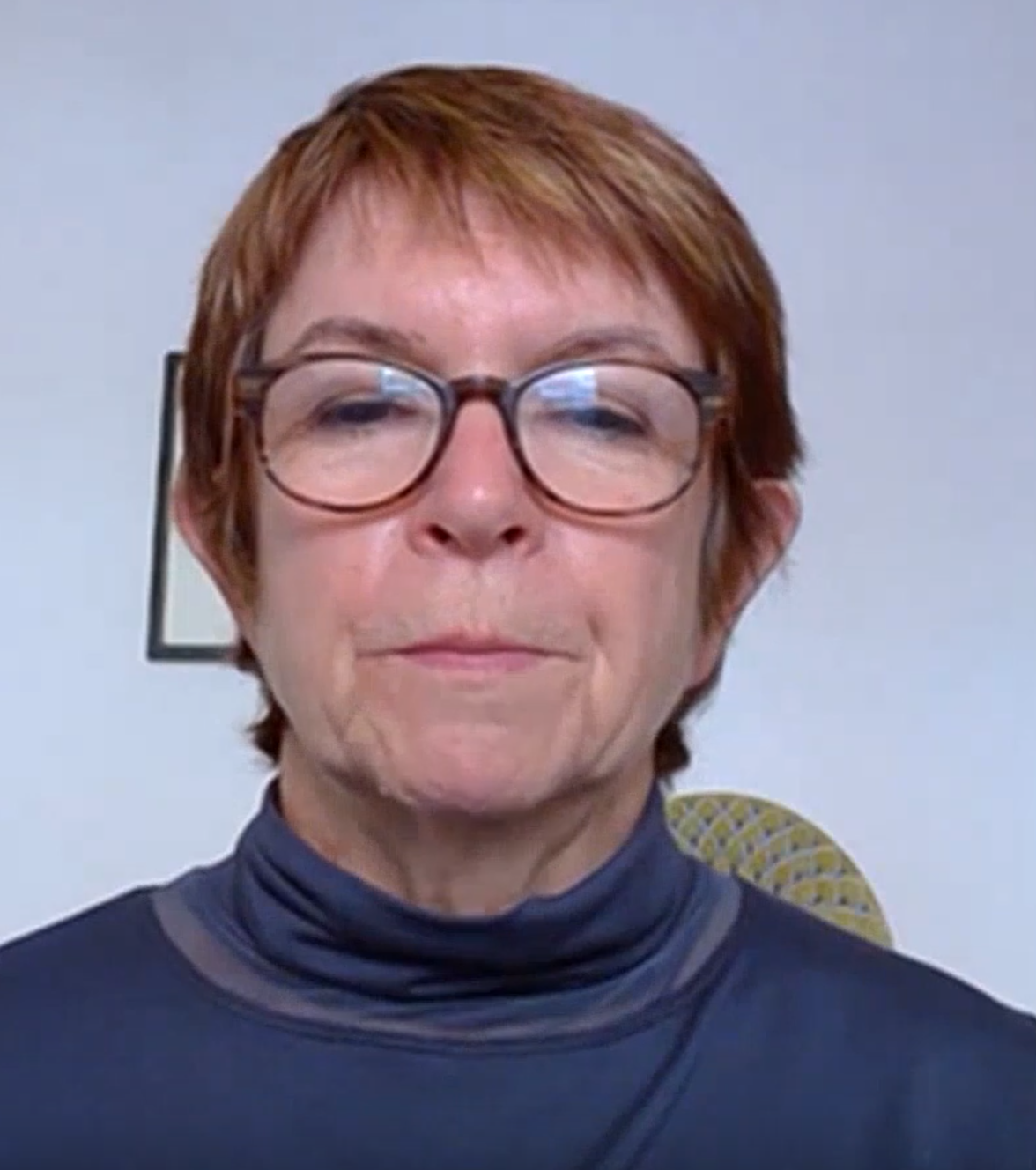
Wendy Thomson, social work professor and current President of the University of London

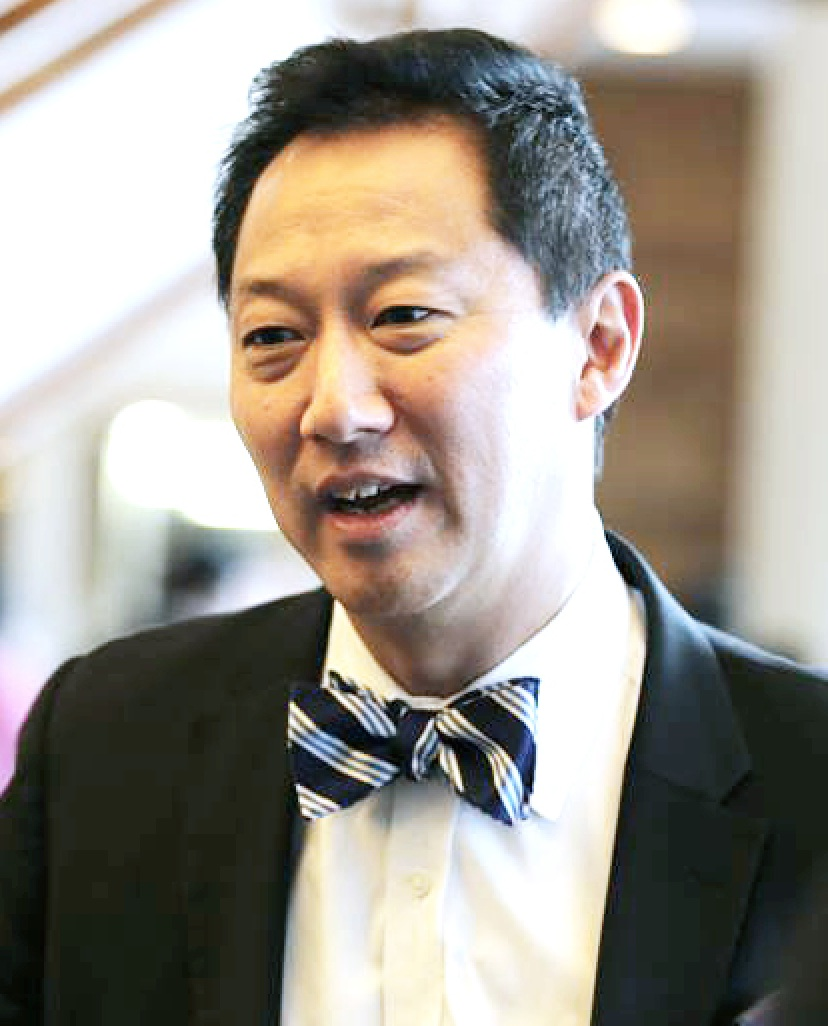
Santa J. Ono, immunologist, 28th President of the University of Cincinnati, 15th President of the University of Michigan; 15th President & Vice-Chancellor of the University of British Columbia

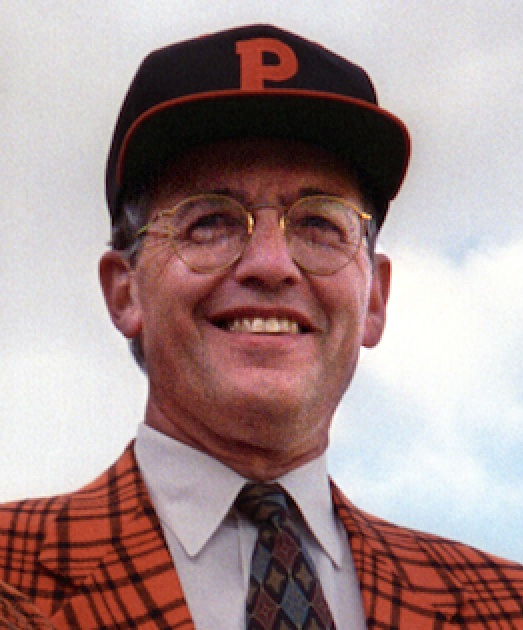
Harold Tafler Shapiro, former President of both Princeton University and the University of Michigan

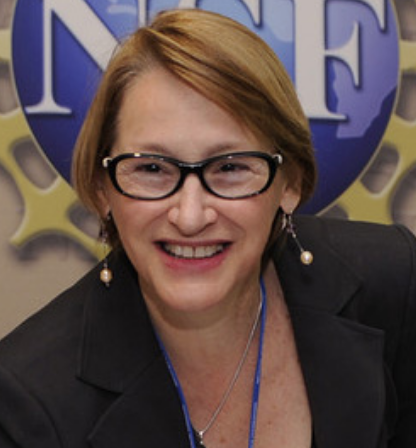
Suzanne Fortier, crystallographer and former Principal of McGill University

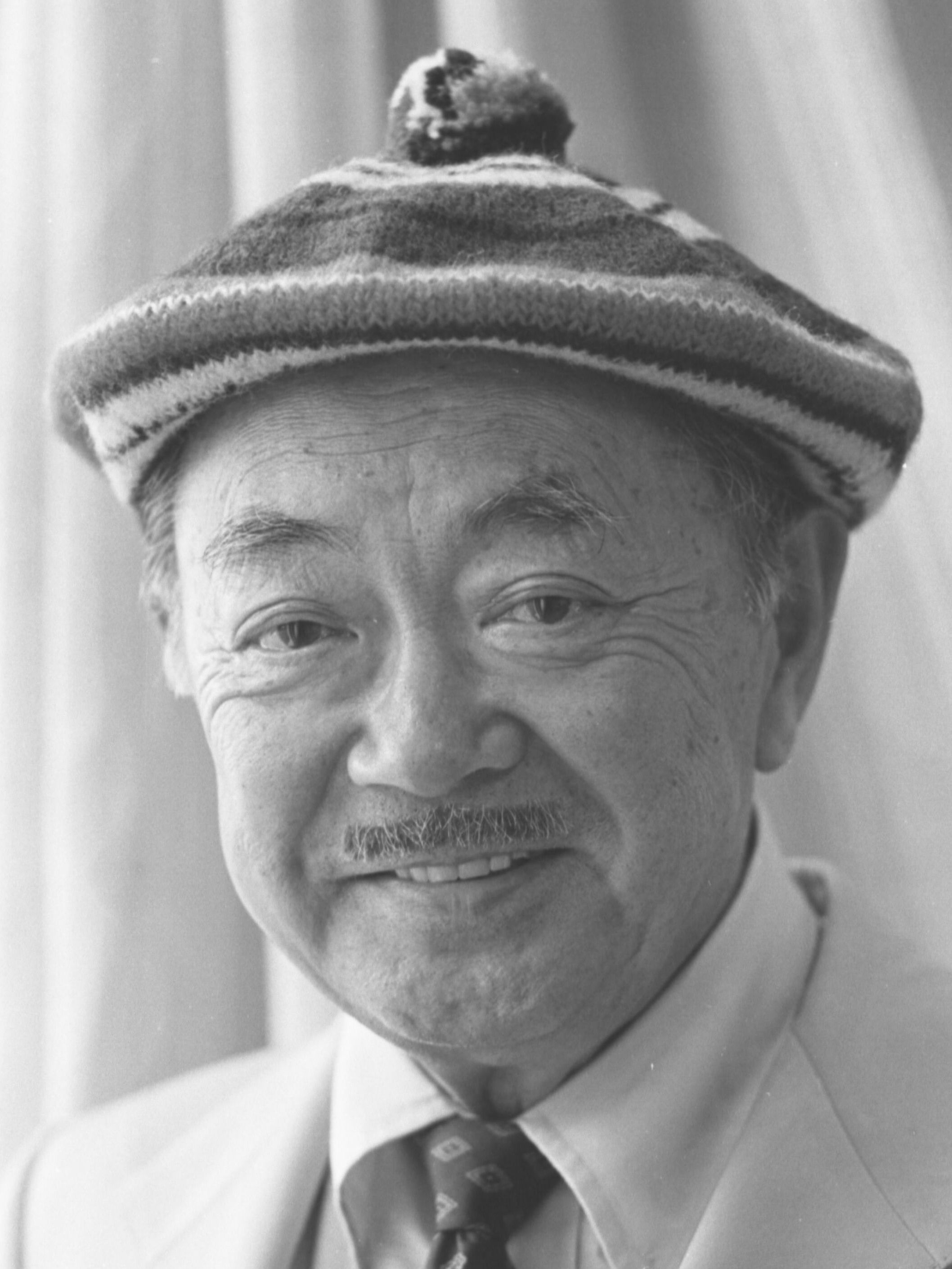
S. I. Hayakawa, internationally renowned linguist, served as U.S. Senator and President of San Francisco State University

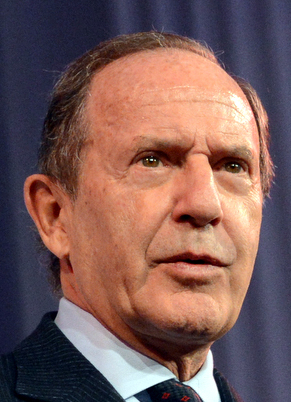
Mortimer Zuckerman, owner-publisher of U.S. News & World Report and New York Daily News, founder-CEO of Boston Properties

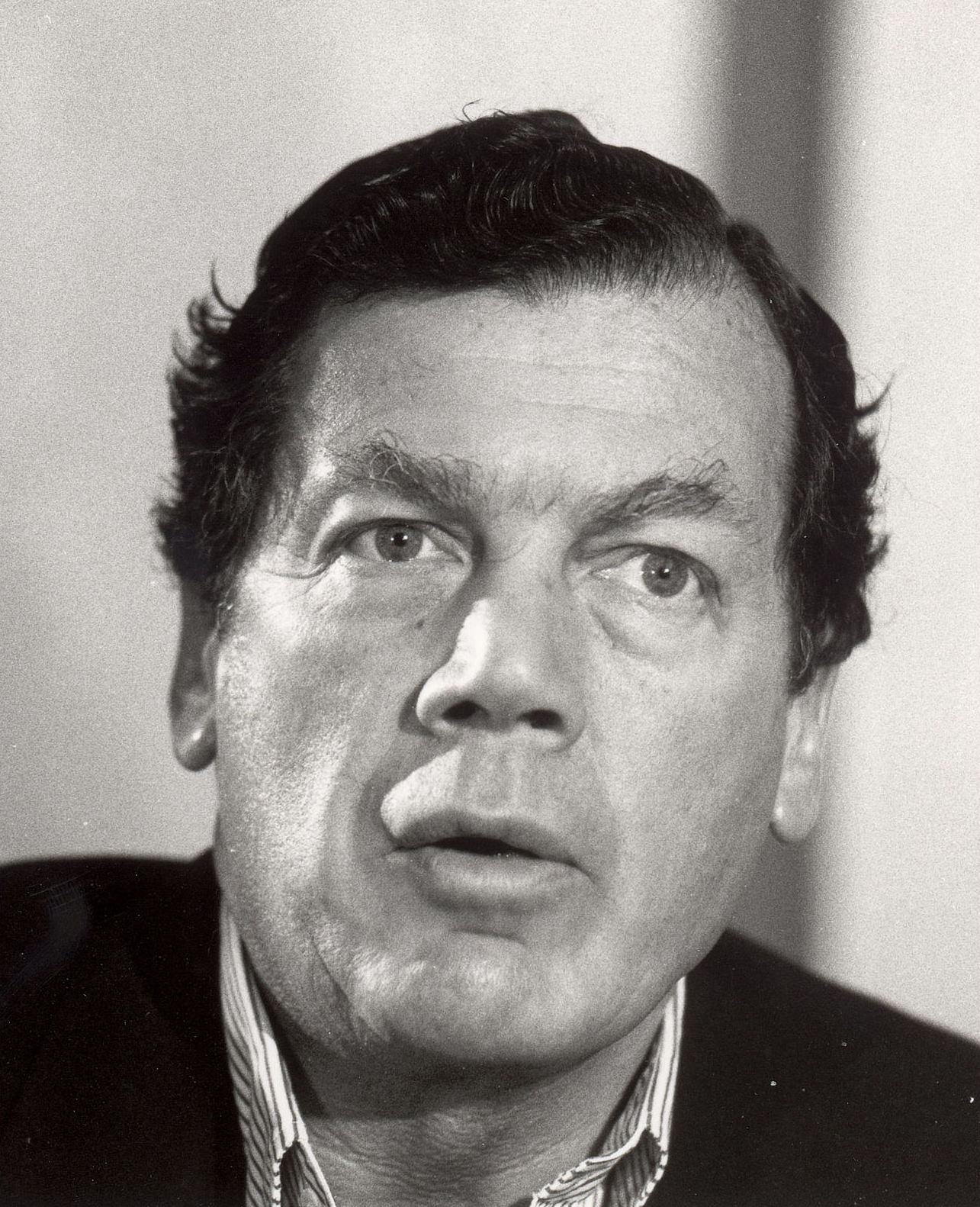
Edgar Bronfman Sr., President-CEO of Seagram and recipient of the US Presidential Medal of Freedom

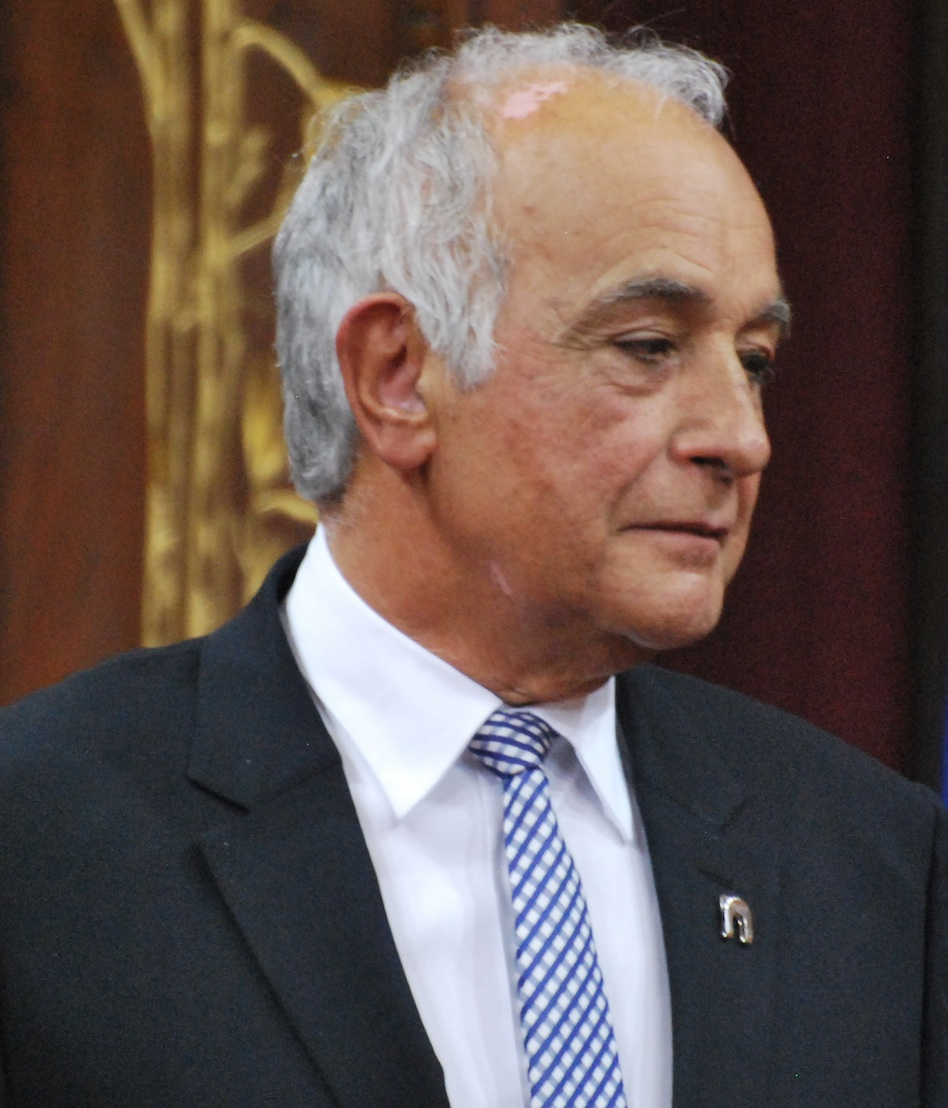
Aldo Bensadoun, retail magnate, founder-chairman of ALDO Shoes and ALDO Racing Team sponsor

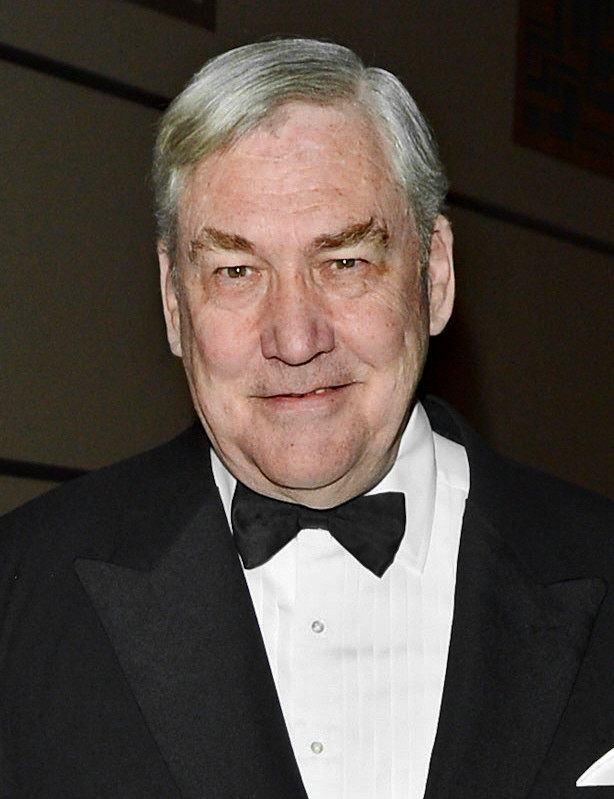
Conrad Black, media tycoon, and current Member of the House of Lords in the British Parliament

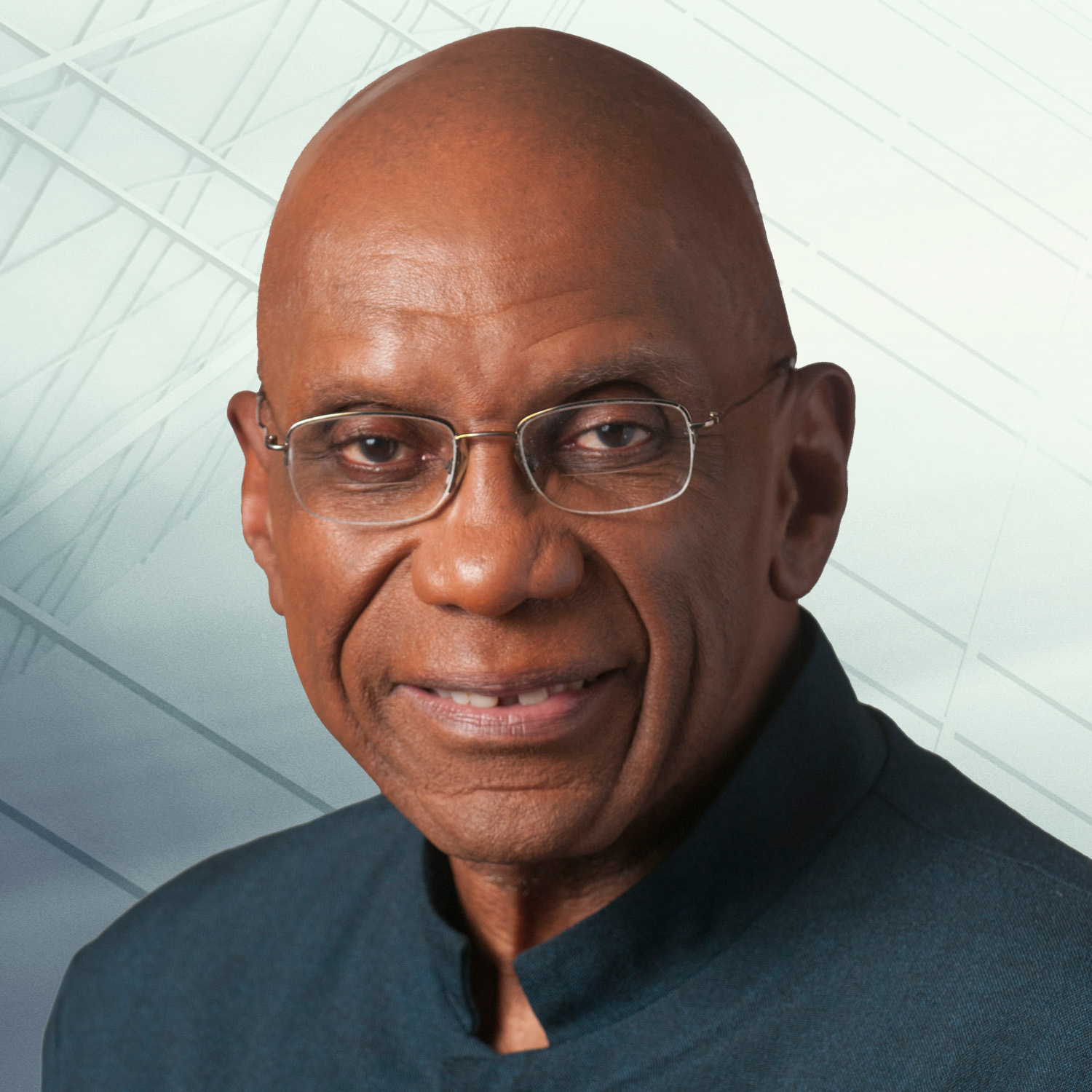
R. DeLisle Worrell, econometrician and Governor of the Central Bank of Barbados

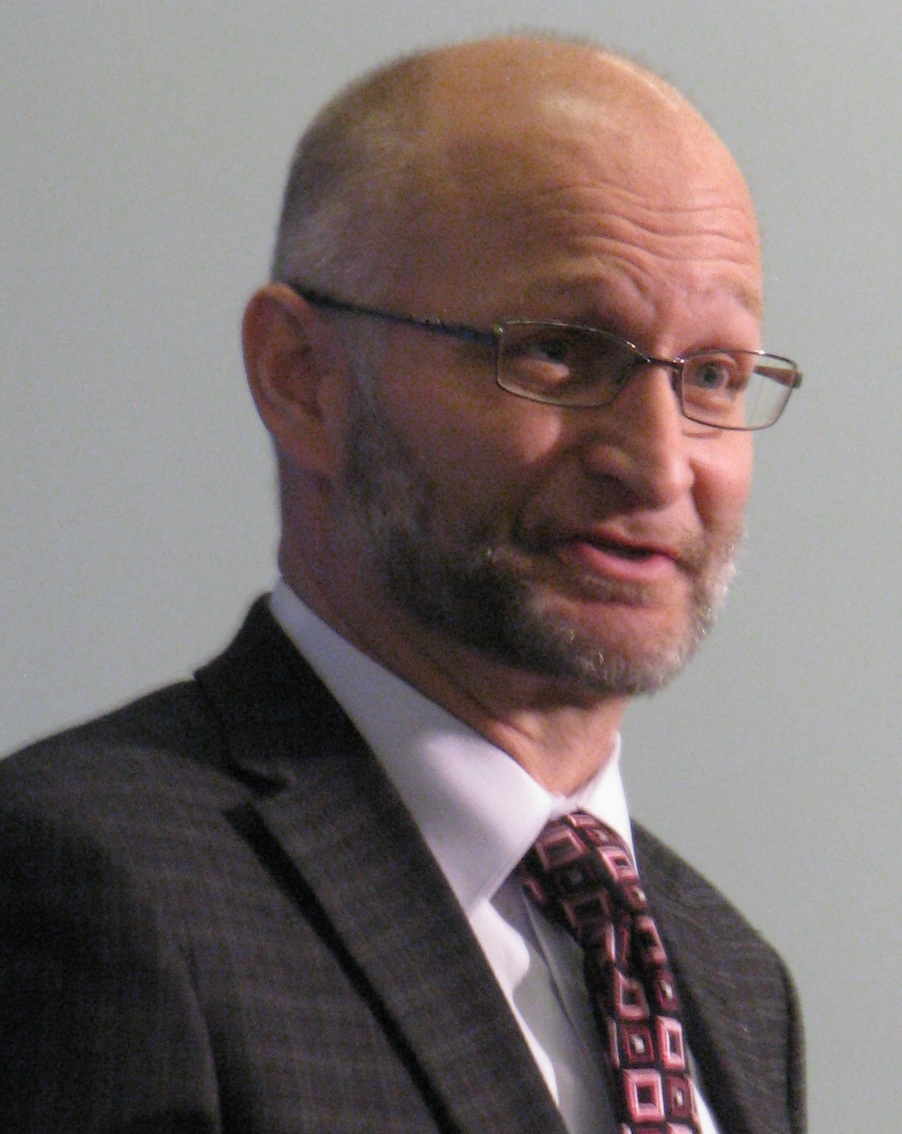
David Lametti, current Minister of Justice and Attorney-General of Canada

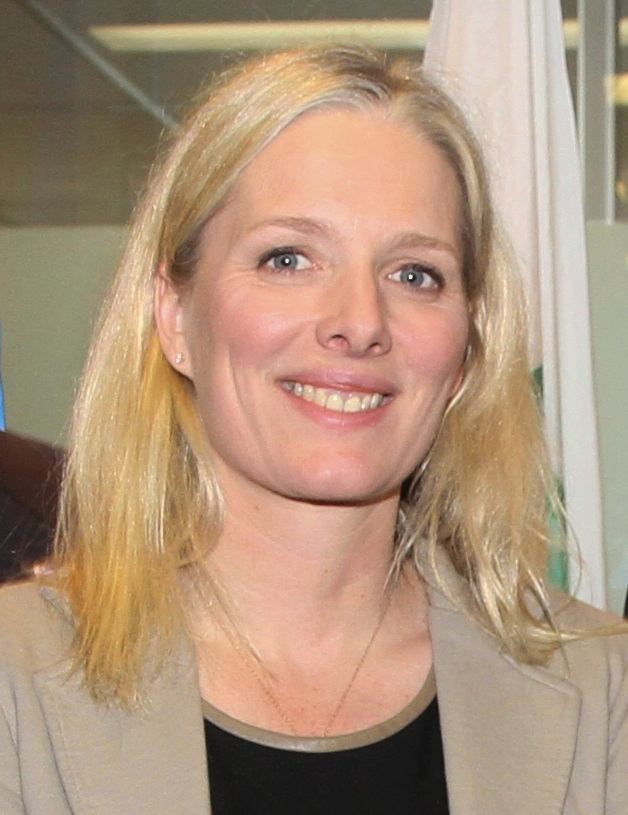
Catherine McKenna, Canada's current Minister of the Environment and Climate Change, and Member of Parliament

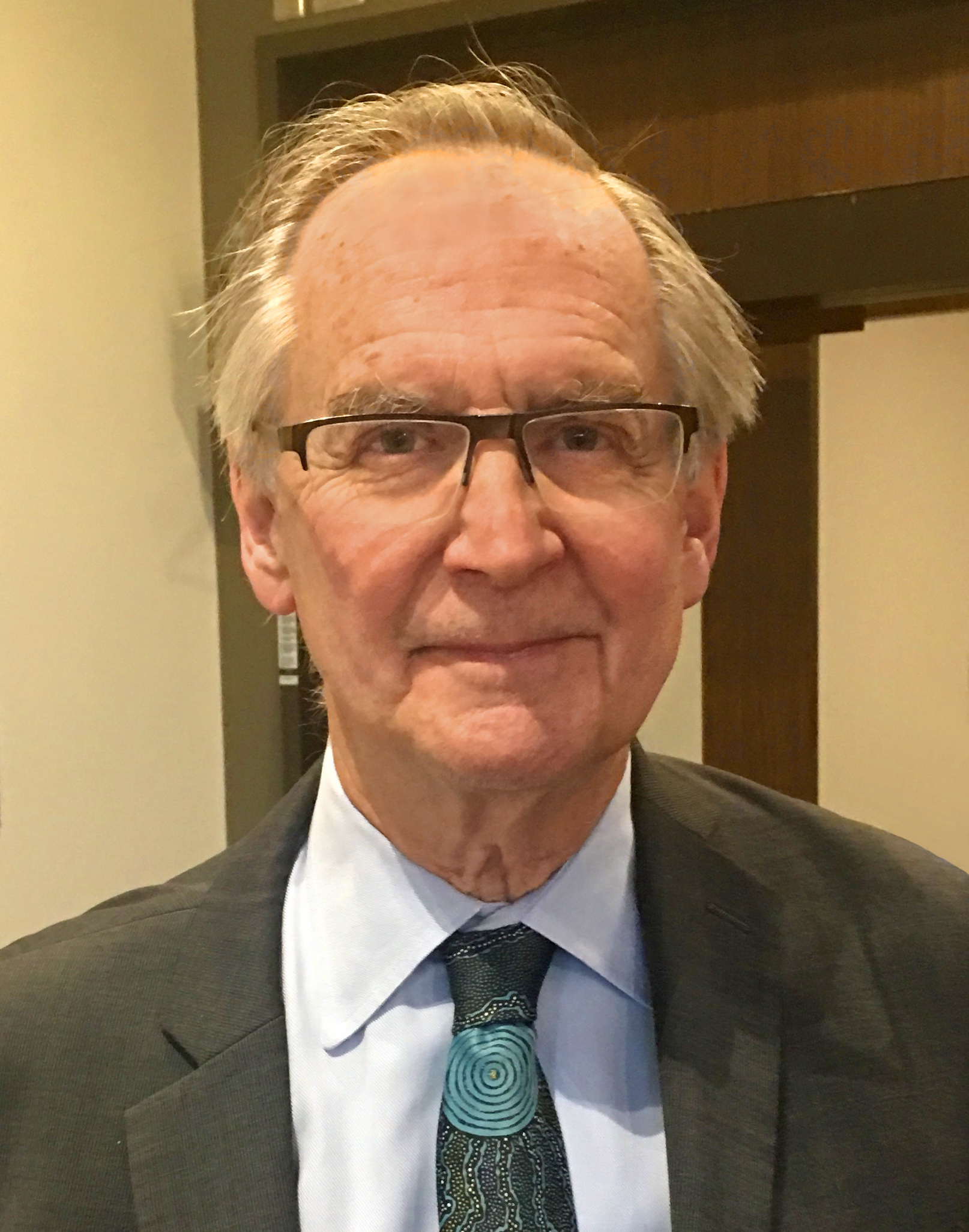
Clément Gascon, current Justice of the Supreme Court of Canada

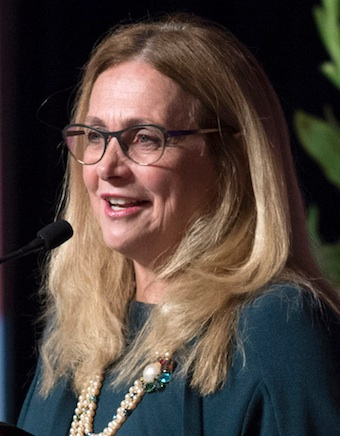
Sheilah Martin, current Justice of the Supreme Court of Canada

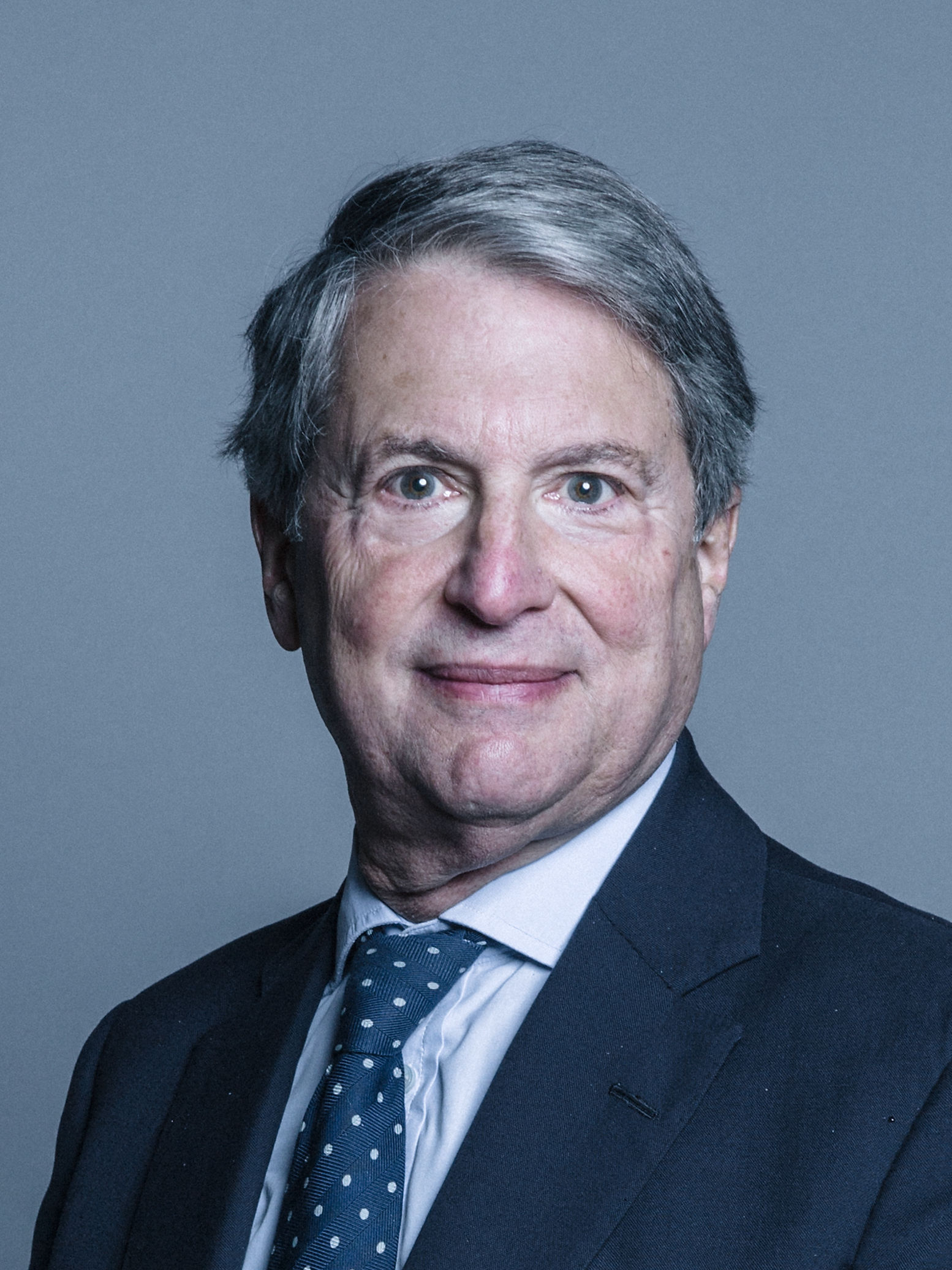
Gordon Wasserman, The Lord Wasserman, current Member of the House of Lords in the British Parliament

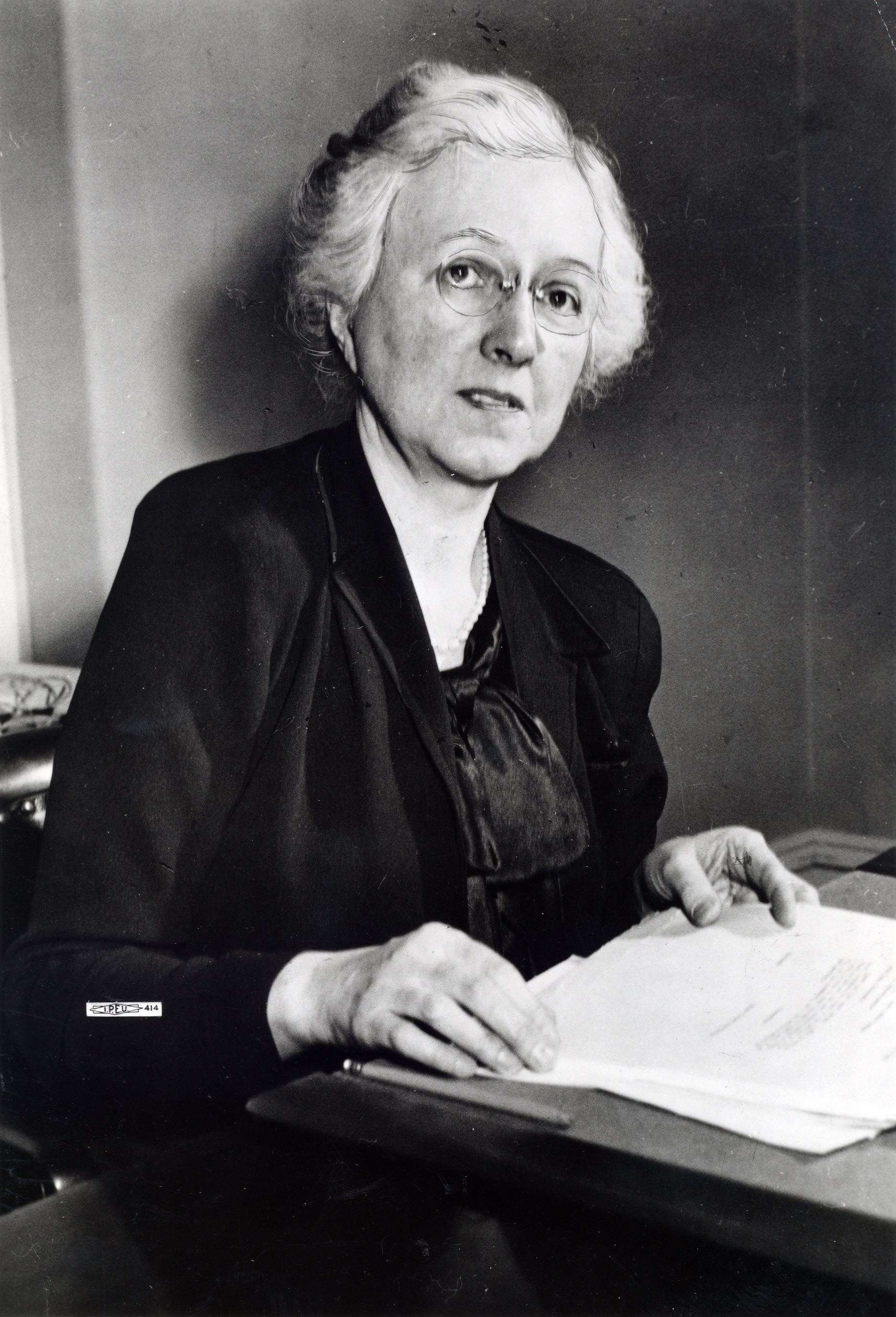
Chase Going Woodhouse, U.S. Congresswoman, early feminist leader, and suffragist

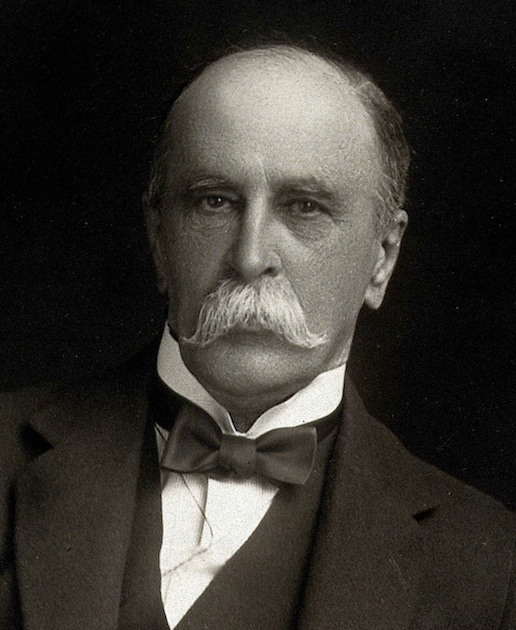
Sir William Osler, "Father of Modern Medicine", co-founded the Johns Hopkins School of Medicine

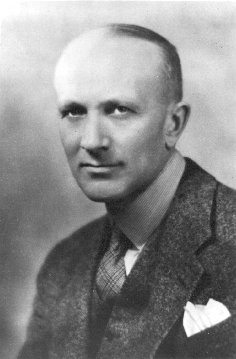
Wilder Penfield, neurosurgeon, discovered electrical stimulation of the human brain

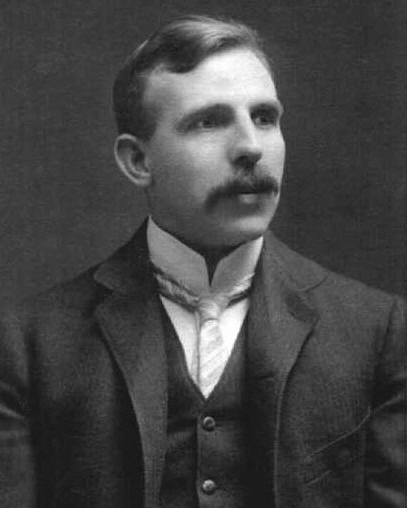
Ernest Rutherford, awarded the 1908 Nobel Prize in Chemistry for path-breaking work in atomic physics

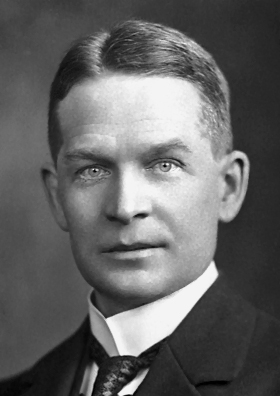
Frederick Soddy received the 1921 Nobel Prize in Chemistry for discovering isotopes

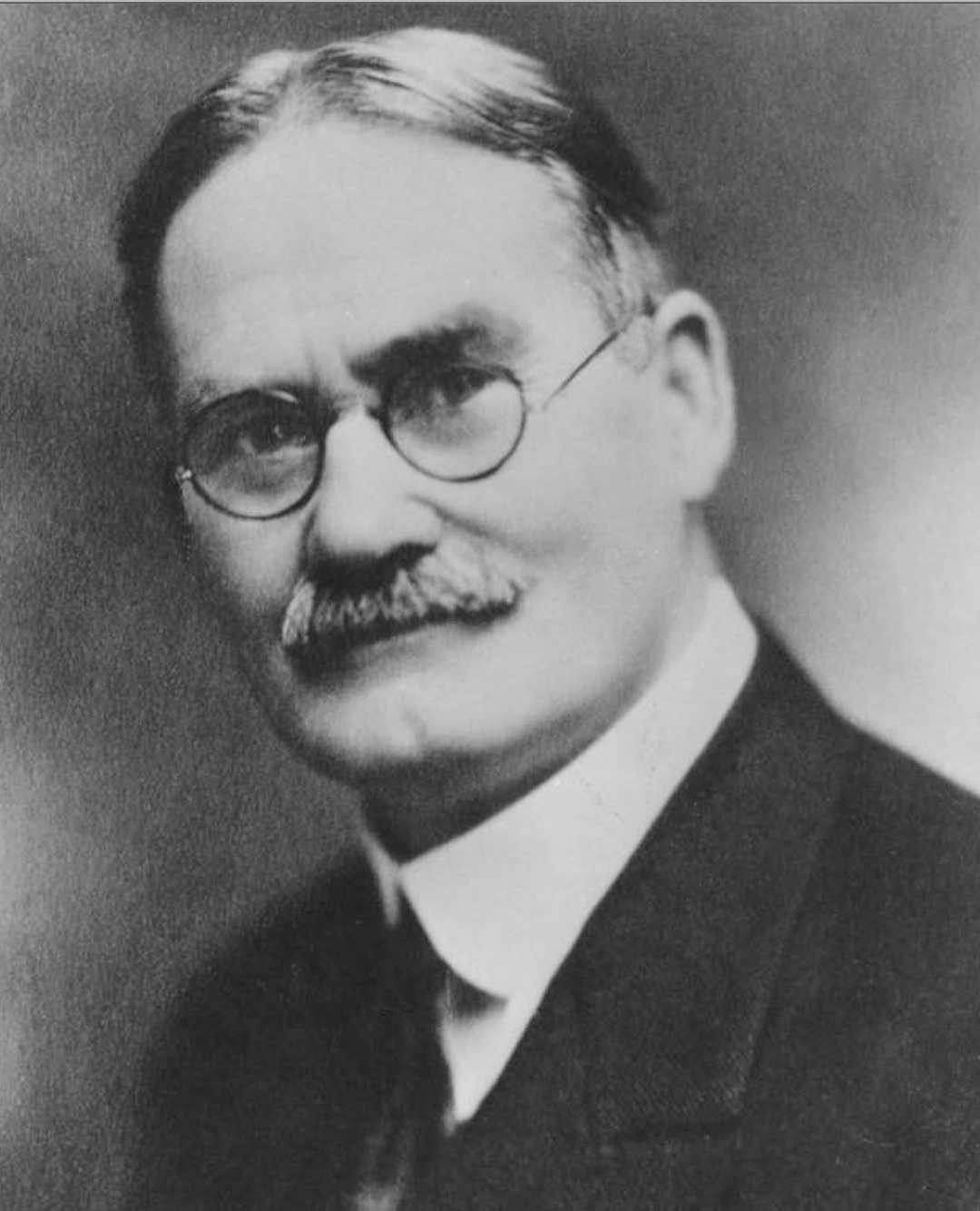
James Naismith, inventor of the sport of basketball

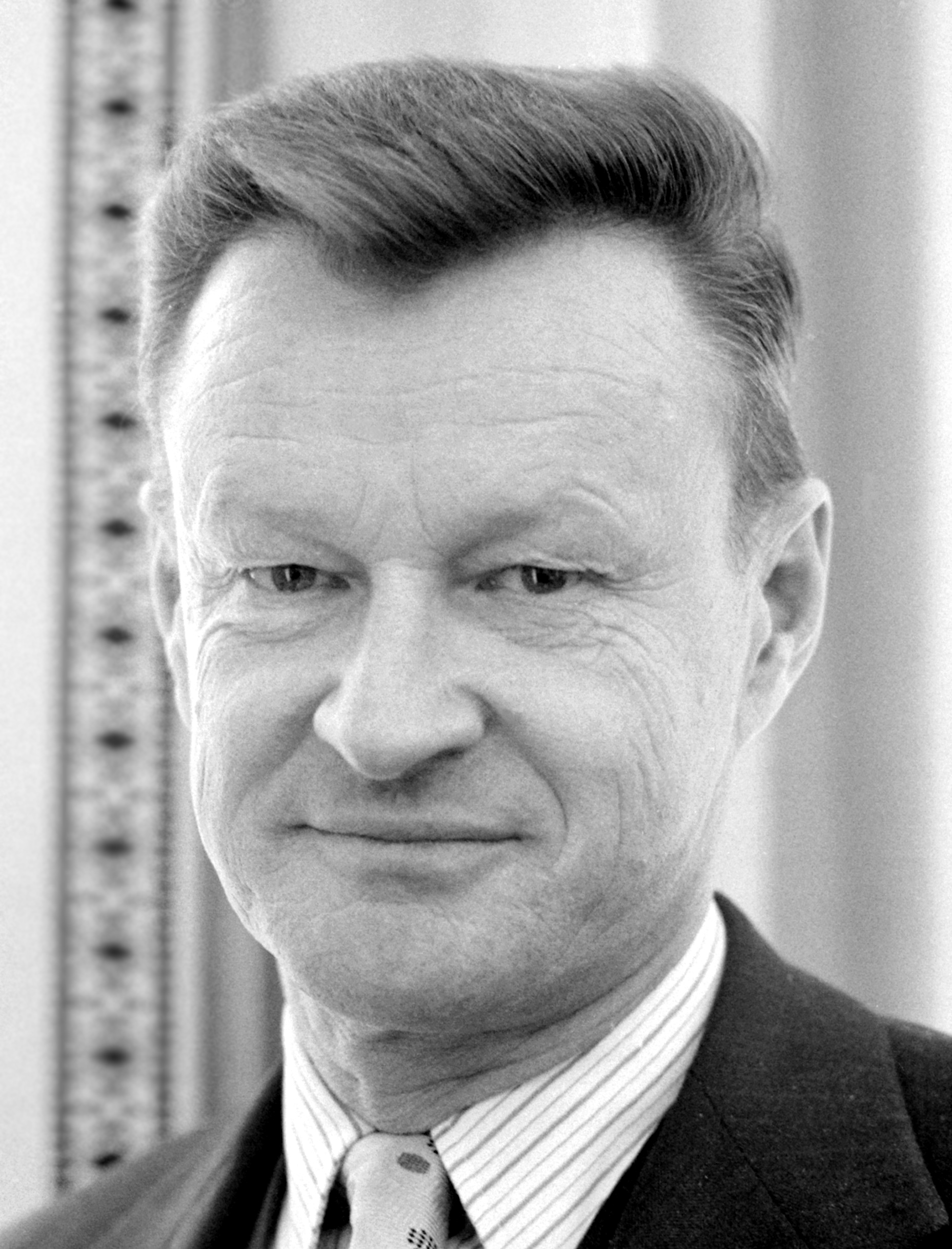
Zbigniew Brzezinski, US National Security Advisor and US Presidential Medal of Freedom recipient

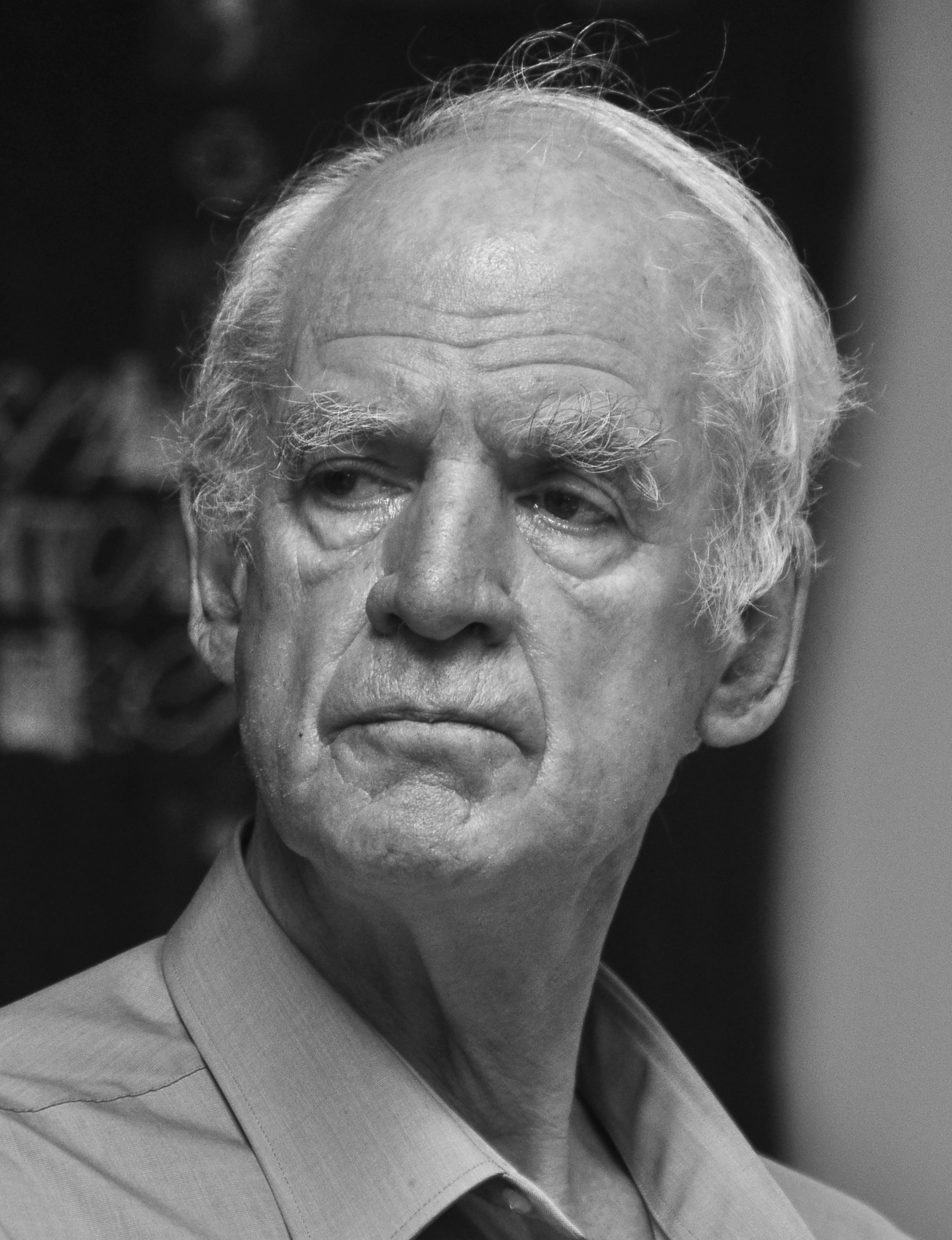
Charles Taylor, multi-awarded philosopher

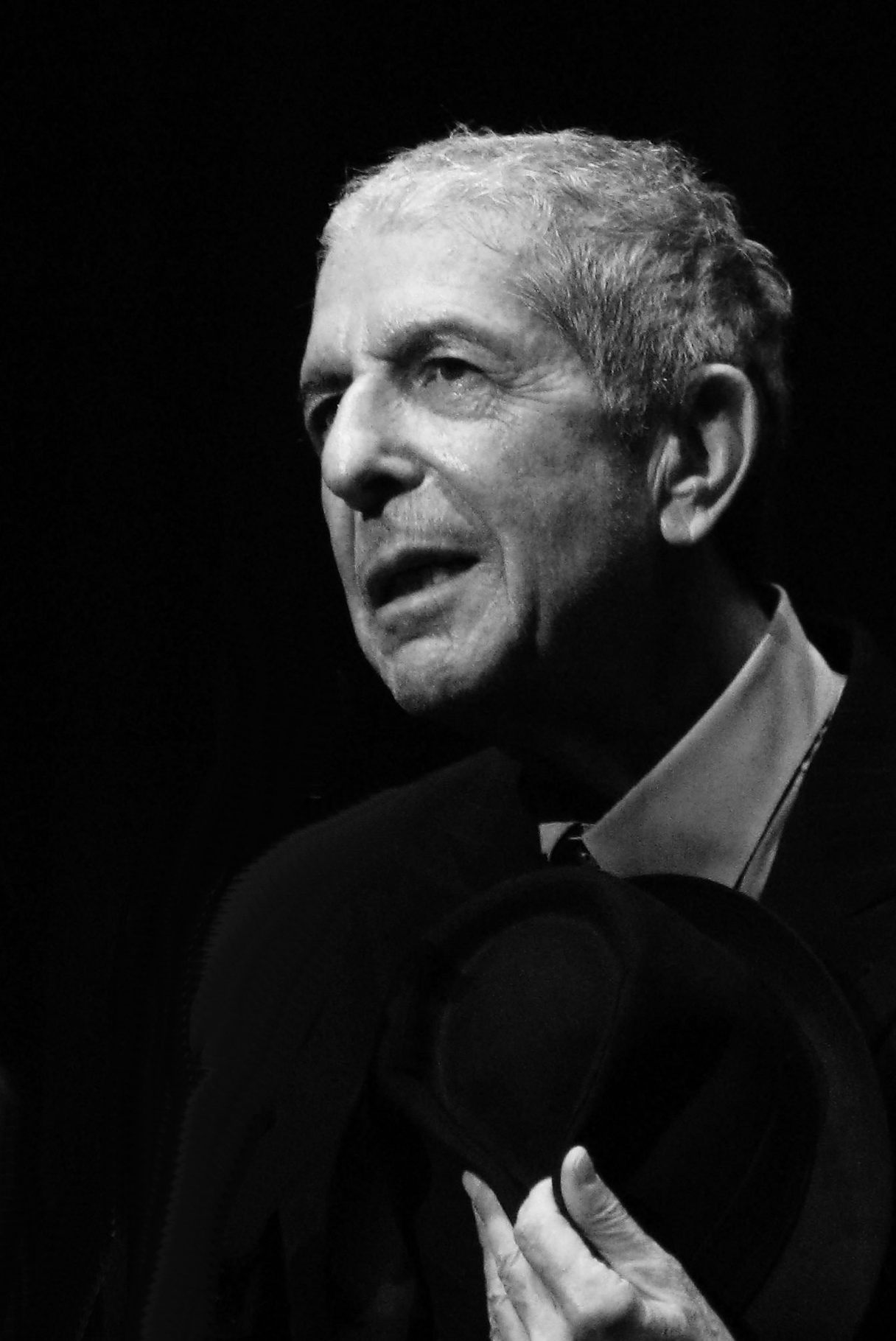
Leonard Cohen, novelist, singer-songwriter, and poet

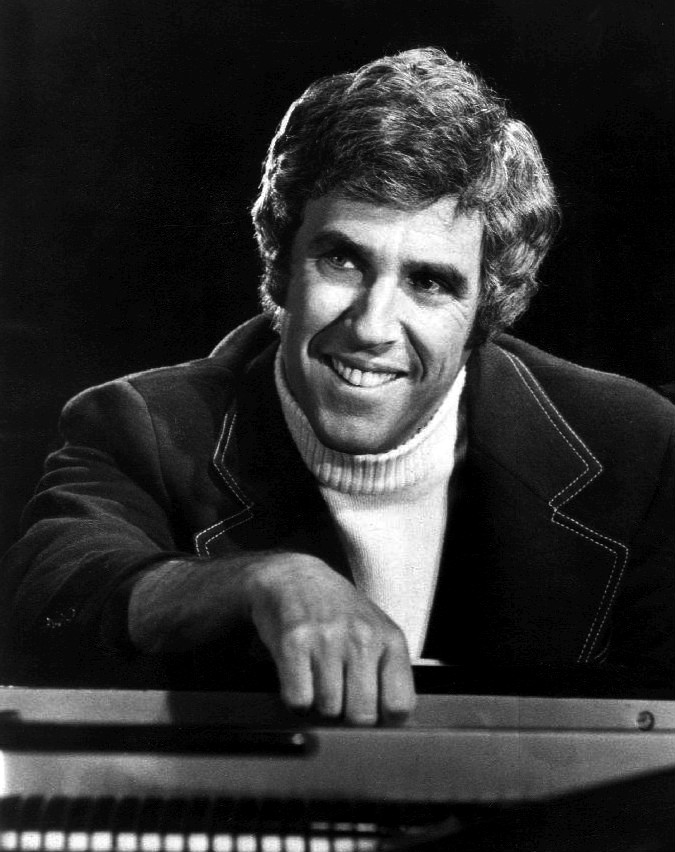
Burt Bacharach, six-time Grammy Award-winning composer and musician

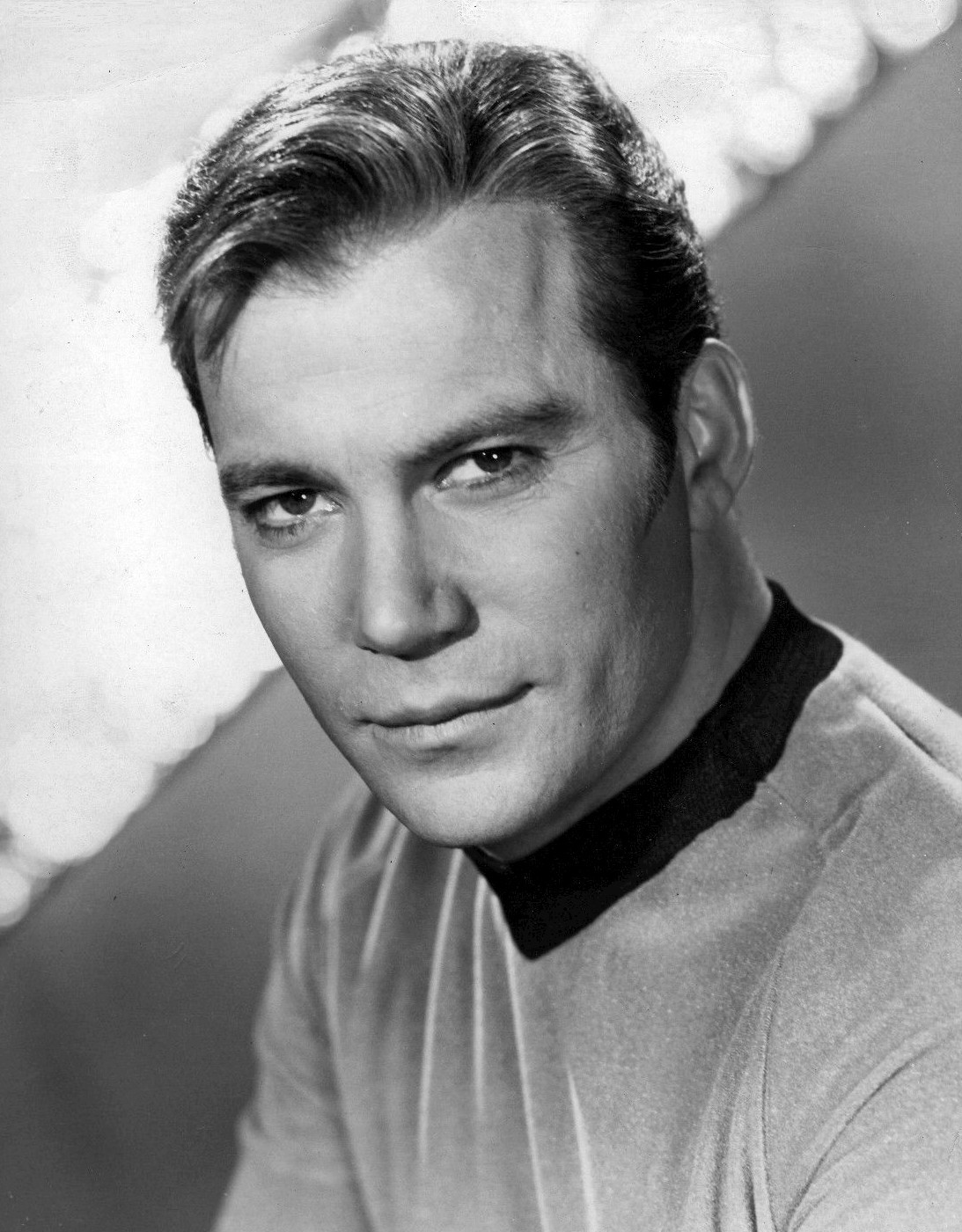
William Shatner, film director and actor best known as Captain James T. Kirk in Star Trek

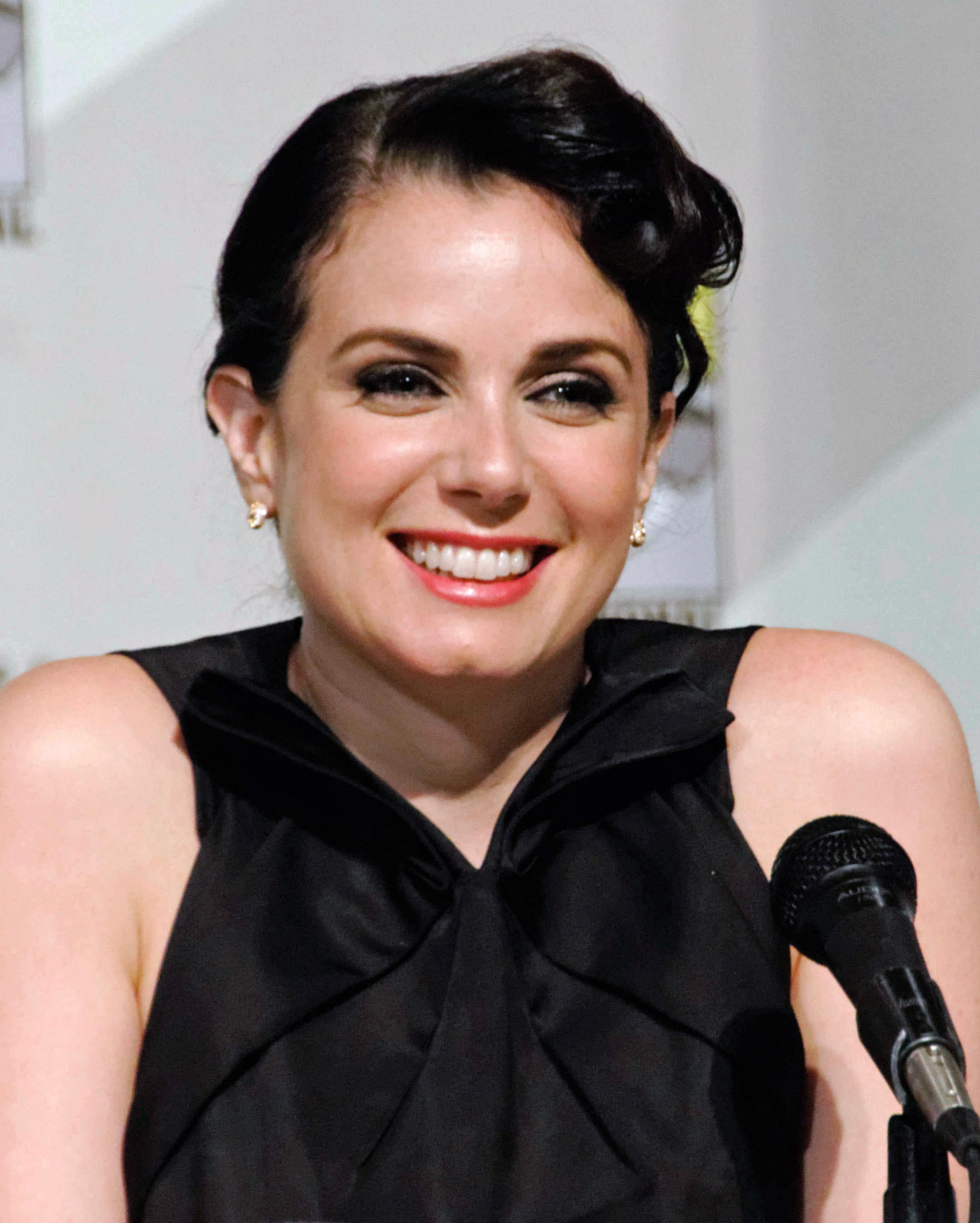
Mia Kirshner, movie and TV actress

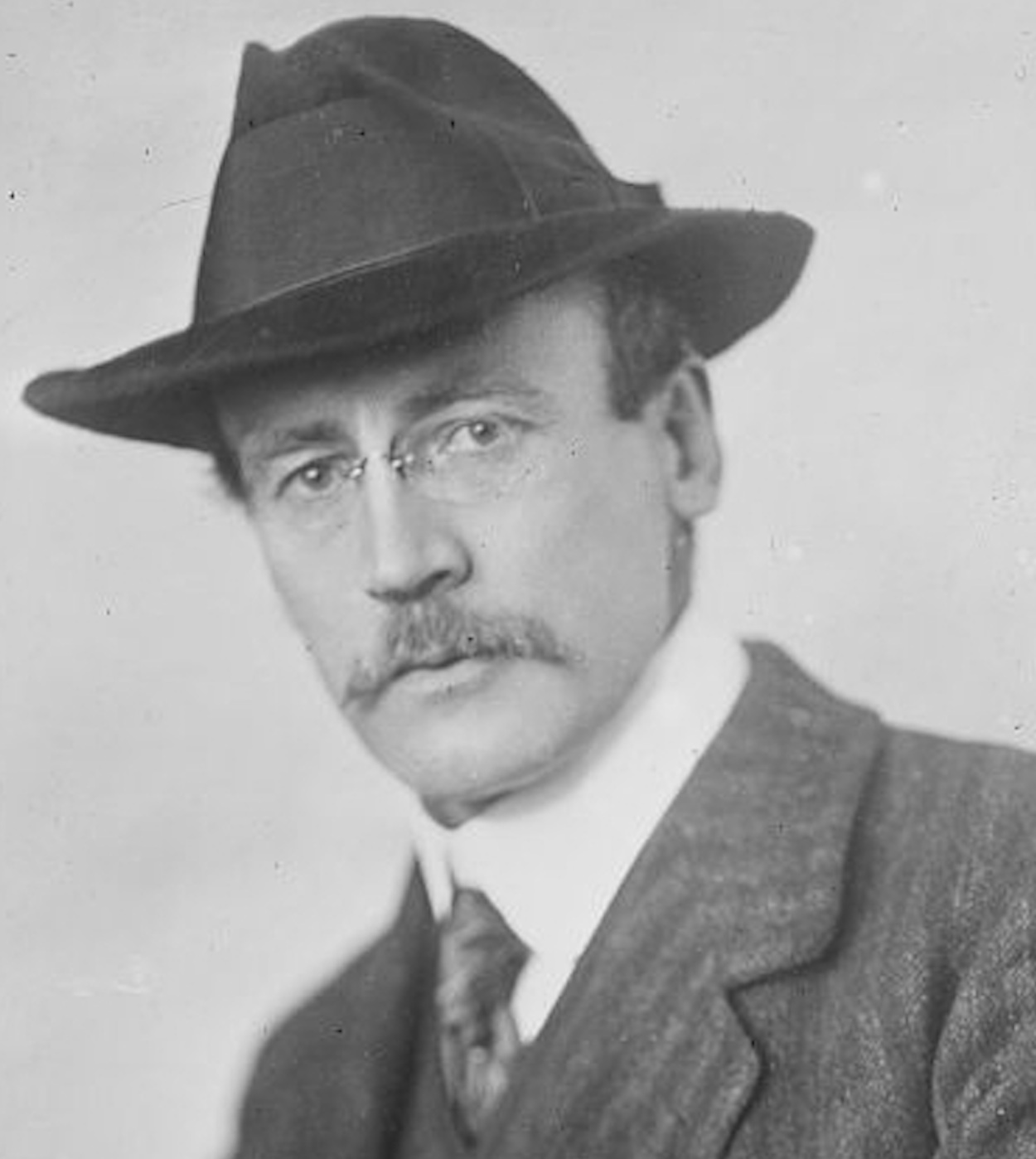
R. Tait McKenzie, renowned sculptor and pioneer in collegiate physical education

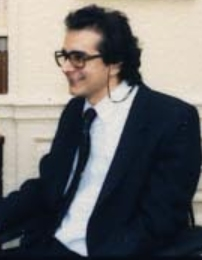
Charles Krauthammer won the 1987 Pulitzer Prize for "witty and insightful columns on national issues"

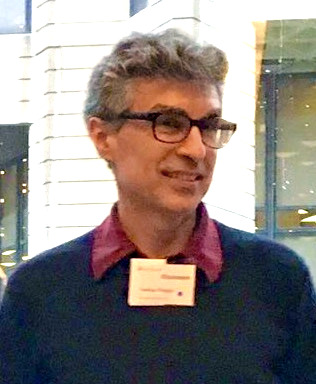
Yoshua Bengio, 2018 recipient of the Turing Award for engineering breakthroughs in deep neural networks as critical component of computing

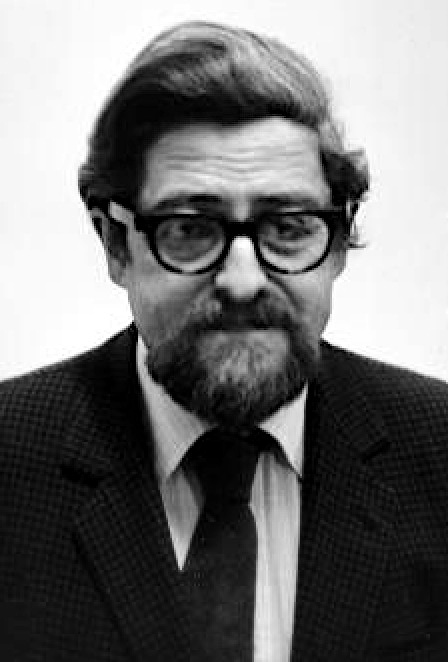
Louis Nirenberg, world-acclaimed mathematician, won the 2015 Abel Prize for "striking and seminal" work on nonlinear partial differential equations

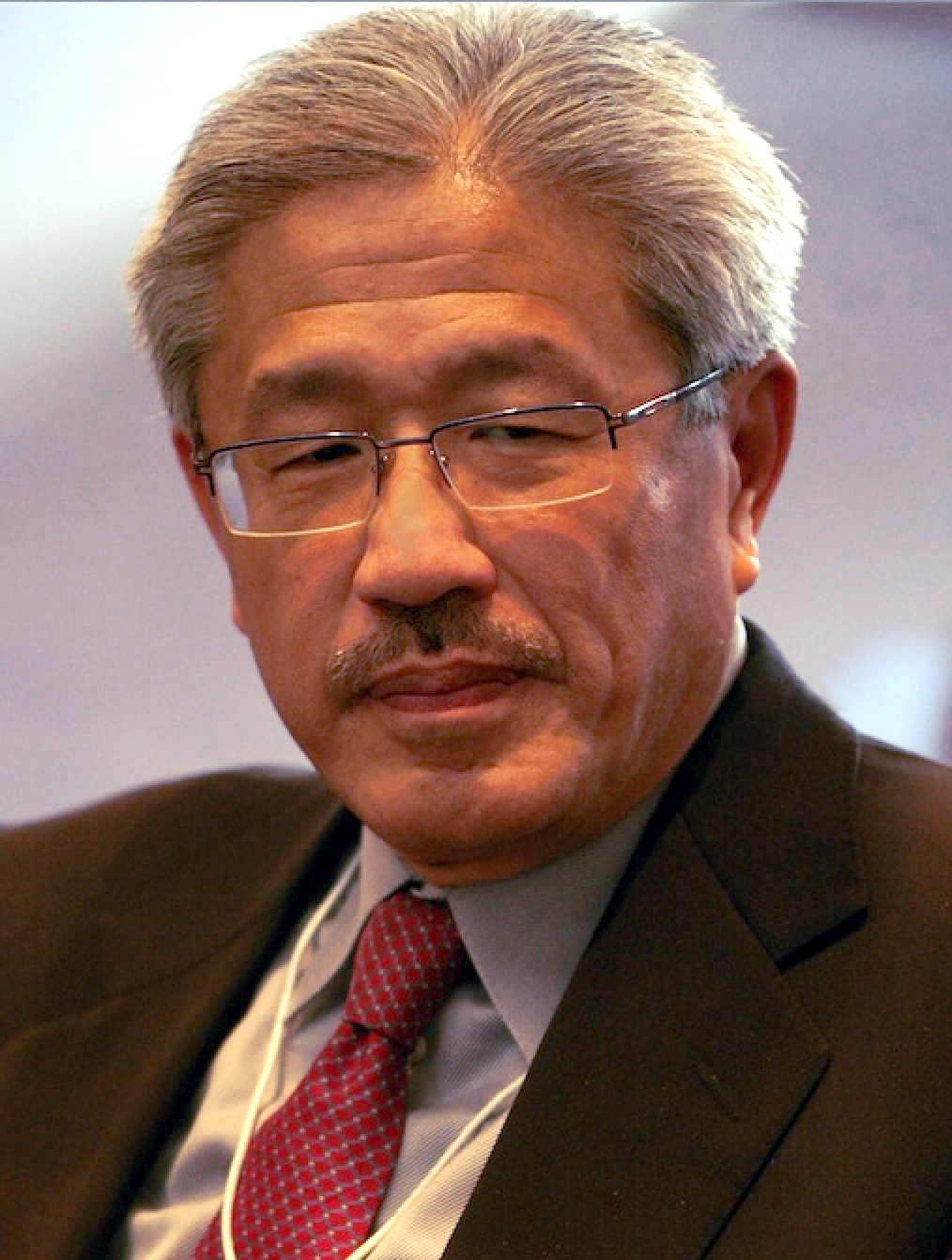
Victor J. Dzau, former chairman, National Institutes of Health (NIH), and current President of the US National Academy of Medicine

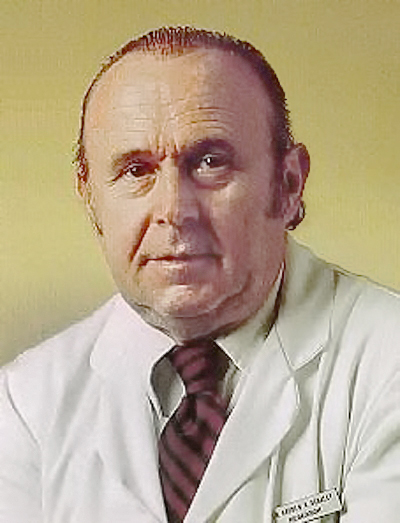
Andrew Schally, awarded the 1977 Nobel Prize in Medicine for pioneering work on hormones

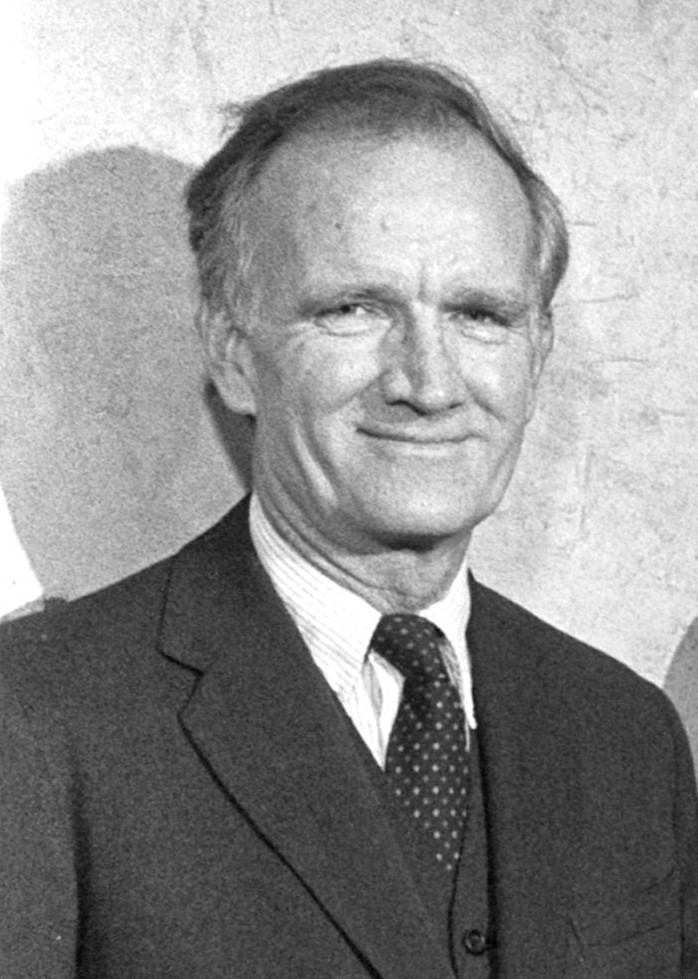
Val Logsdon Fitch, 1980 Nobel Prize in Physics for disproving that particle interaction is indifferent to the direction of time

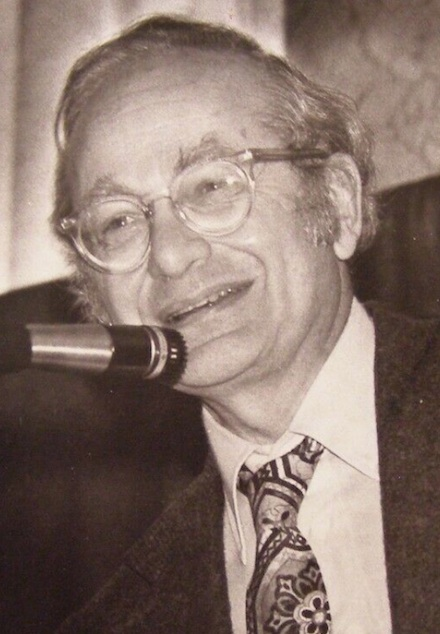
David H. Hubel received the 1981 Nobel Prize in Medicine for discoveries of information processing in the visual system

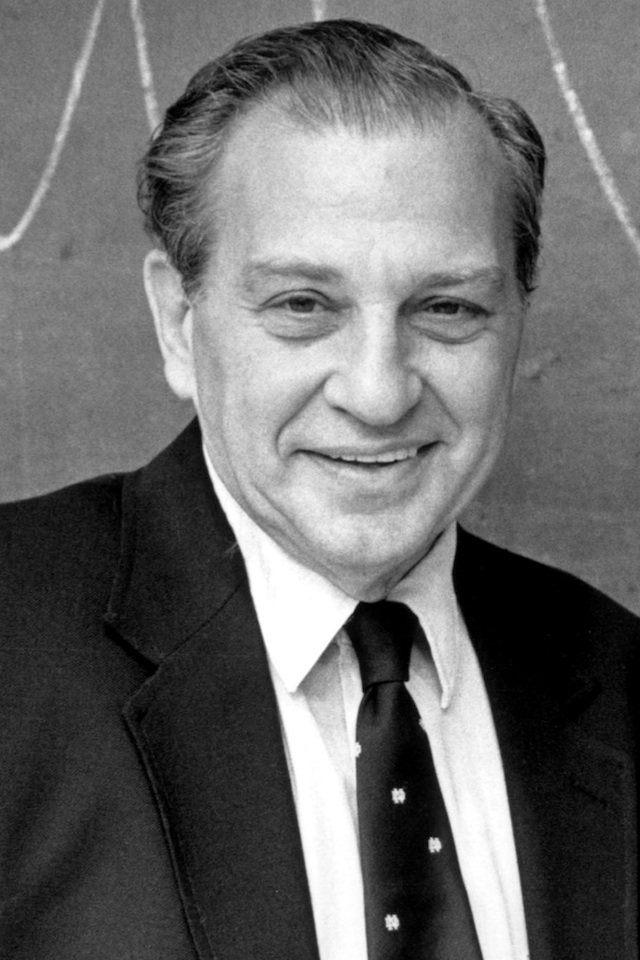
Rudolph A. Marcus, winner of the 1992 Nobel Prize in Chemistry for groundbreaking theory of electron transfer

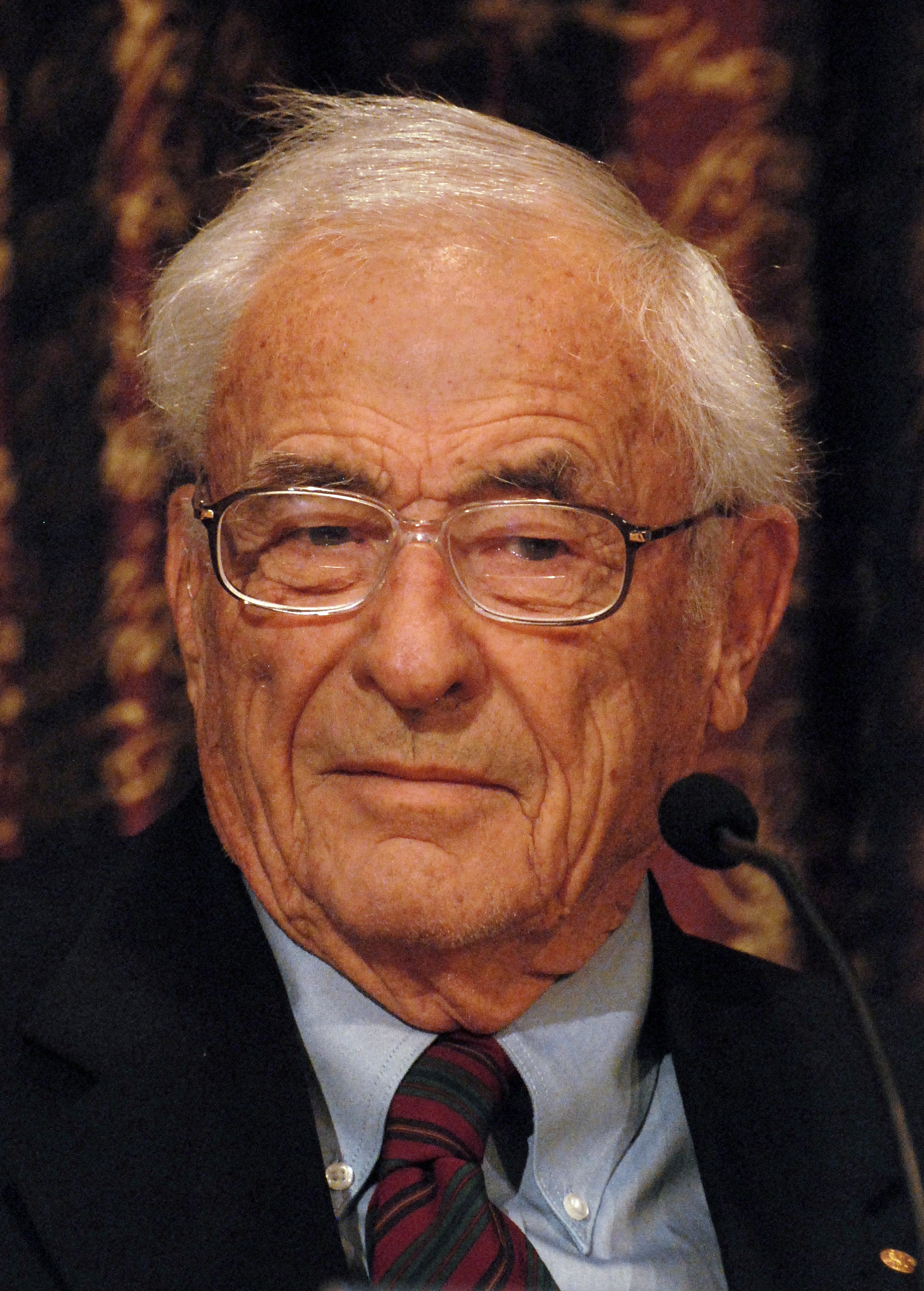
Willard Boyle, 2009 Nobel Prize in Physics for inventing "an imaging semiconductor circuit" as "core technology behind the digital photography revolution"

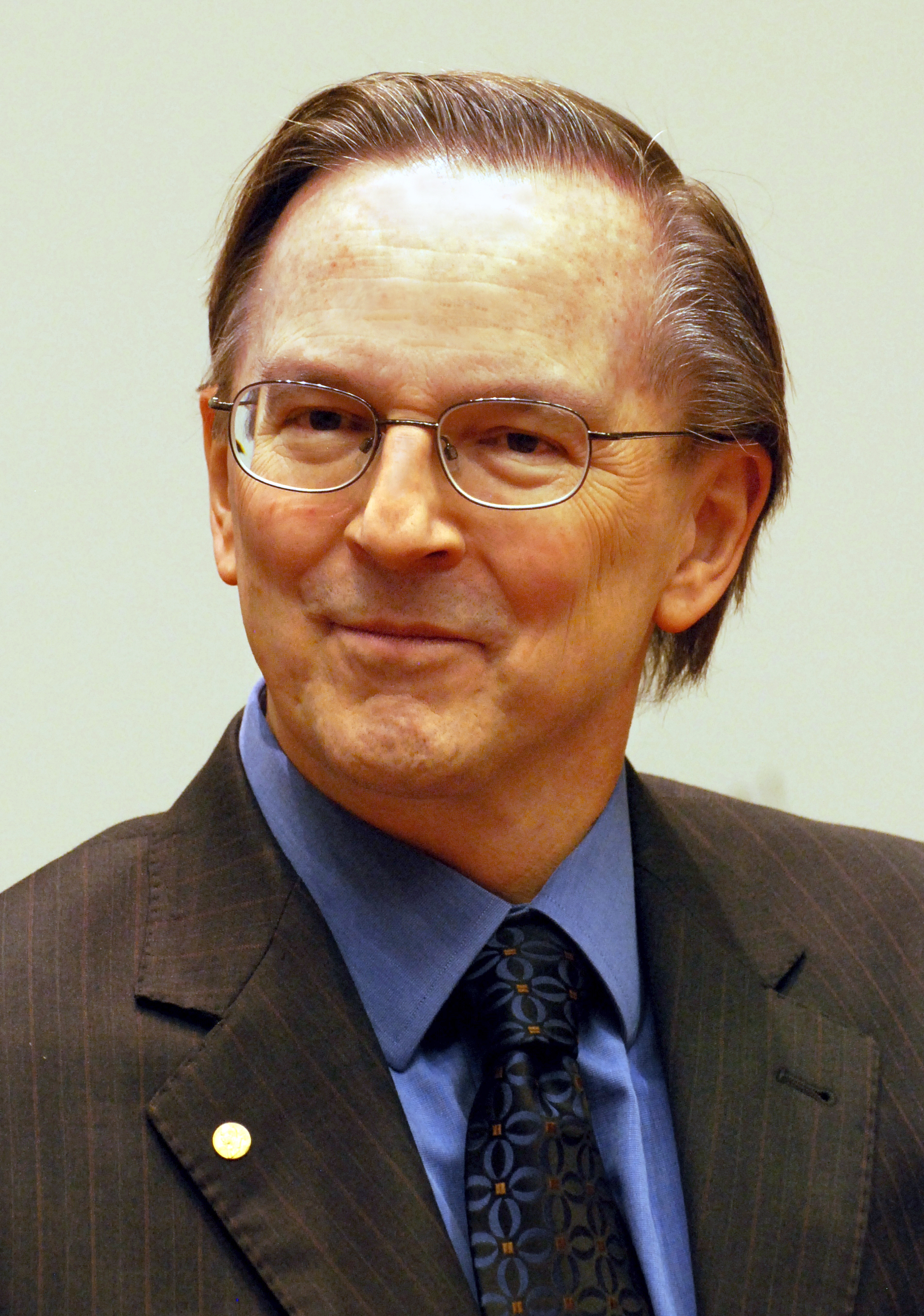
Jack W. Szostak, 2009 Nobel Prize in Medicine for discovering how the body protects chromosomes housing genetic code

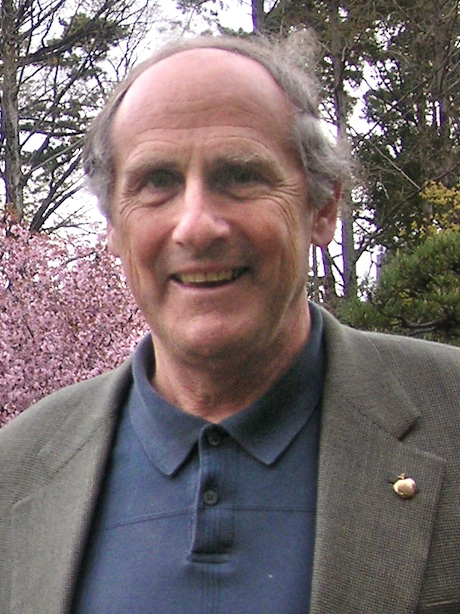
Ralph Steinman won the 2011 Nobel Prize in Medicine for discovering dendritic cells and their role in immunity

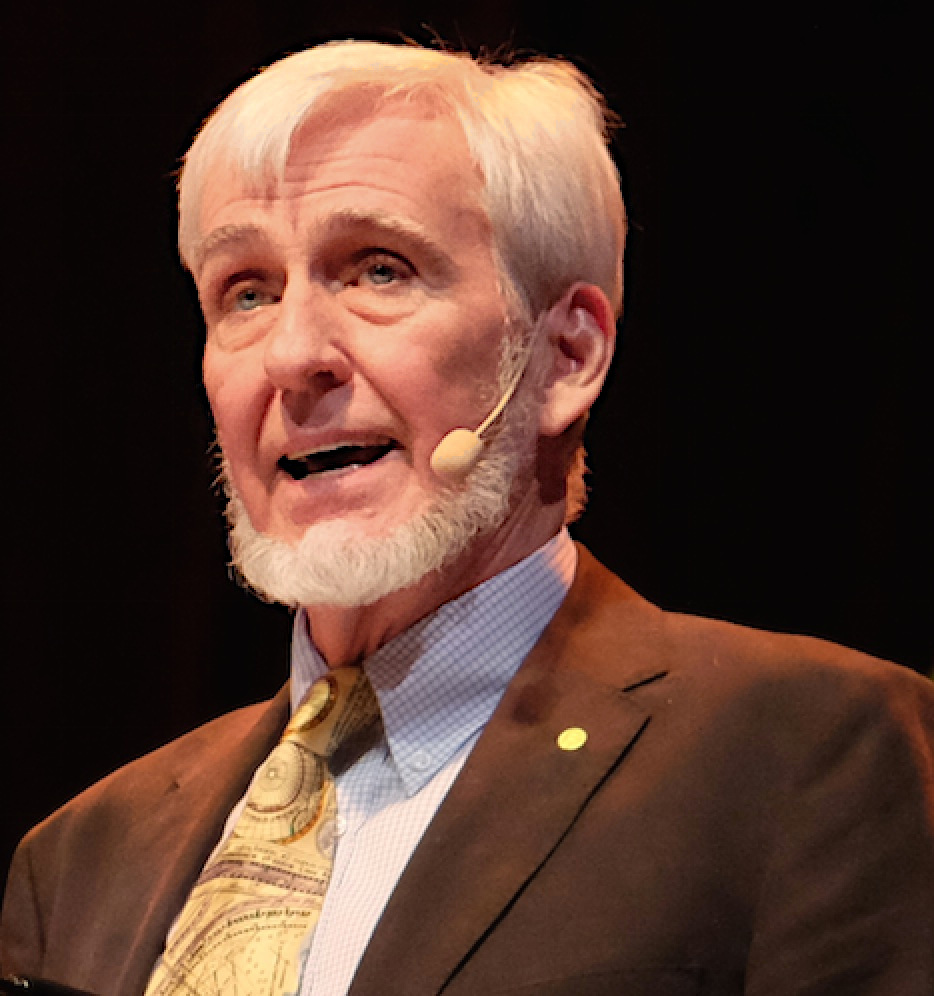
John O'Keefe received the 2014 Nobel Prize in Medicine for discovering the brain's positioning system

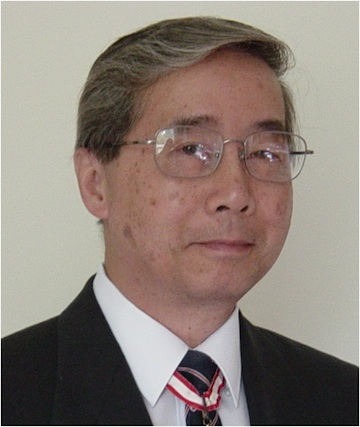
Thomas Chang, inventor of the artificial cell and three-time nominee for the Nobel Prize in Medicine

=== Nobel Prize graduates and faculty members ===
Name	Affiliation at McGill	Nobel Prize	Year
Anne Carson	Former professor	Literature	2026
Peter Howitt	Alumnus	Economics	2025
J. Michael Kosterlitz	Former professor	Physics	2016
John O'Keefe	Alumnus	Physiology or Medicine	2014
Ralph M. Steinman	Alumnus	Physiology or Medicine	2011
Willard S. Boyle	Alumnus	Physics	2009
Jack Szostak	Alumnus	Physiology or Medicine	2009
Robert Mundell	Former professor	Economics	1998
Rudolph Marcus	Alumnus	Chemistry	1992
David Hunter Hubel	Alumnus	Physiology or Medicine	1981
Val Logsdon Fitch	Alumnus	Physics	1980
Andrew Schally	Alumnus	Physiology or Medicine	1977
Otto Hahn	Scientist	Chemistry	1944
John R. Macleod	Former professor	Physiology or Medicine	1923
Frederick Soddy	Former researcher/demonstrator	Chemistry	1921
Ernest Rutherford	Former professor	Chemistry	1908

=== Academy Awards ===
Name	Affiliation at McGill	Academy Award	Year
Kate Biscoe	Alumna	Best Makeup and Hairstyling	2019
Torill Kove	Alumna	Best Animated Short Film	2006
Demetri Terzopoulos	Alumnus	Technical Achievement	2006
Edward Saxon	Alumnus	Best Picture	1991
Jake Eberts	Alumnus	Best Picture	1990
John Weldon	Alumnus	Best Animated Short Film	1978
Beverly Shaffer	Alumna	Best Live Action Short Film	1977
Burt Bacharach	Alumnus	Best Original Song	1969, 1981
Burt Bacharach	Alumnus	Best Original Score for a Motion Picture (not a Musical)	1969

=== Grammy Awards ===
Name	Affiliation at McGill	Grammy Award	Year
George Massenburg	Professor	Various	2024, 2022, 2011, 1997, 1990
Estelí Gomez	Alumnus	Best Chamber Music/Small Ensemble Performance	2024, 2014
Serban Ghenea	Alumnus	Various	2024, 2024, 2022, 2021, 2021, 2019, 2019, 2018, 2018, 2018, 2018, 2018, 2017, 2016, 2016, 2016, 2013, 2011, 2006, 2005, 2004
Steven Epstein	Professor	Various	2022, 2020, 2013, 2013, 2010, 2010, 2004, 2004, 2002, 2001, 2001, 2000, 1999, 1998, 1998, 1996, 1985
Richard King	Alumnus/Professor	Various	2022, 2020, 2015, 2015, 2013, 2013, 2013, 2010, 2010, 2004, 2004, 2003, 2002, 2002, 2001
Nick Squire	Alumnus	Various	2019, 2019, 2017, 2016
Leonard Cohen	Alumnus	Various	2018, 2008
Brian Losch	Alumnus	Various	2014, 2014
Jennifer Gasoi	Alumnus	Best Children's Album	2014
Chilly Gonzales	Alumnus	Album of the Year	2014
Win Butler	Alumnus	Album of the Year	2011
Régine Chassagne	Alumnus	Album of the Year	2011
Burt Bacharach	Alumnus	Various	2006, 1999, 1987, 1970, 1970, 1968

=== Emmy Awards ===
Name	Affiliation at McGill	Emmy Award	Year
David Bernad	Alumnus	Various	2023, 2022
Amy Schatz	Alumnus	Various	2020, 2011, 2008, 2005, 2003, 2000, 1997, 1995
Billy Wisse	Alumnus	Various	2021, 2020, 2017, 2015, 2014, 2012, 2011, 2006, 2003, 2002, 1998, 1997
Robby Hoffman	Alumnus	Outstanding Writing for a Children's, Preschool Children's, Family Viewing	2019
Eva Lipman	Alumnus	Exceptional Merit in Documentary Filmmaking	2016
Kate Biscoe	Alumnus	Various	2013, 2013
Mila Aung-Thwin	Alumnus	Various	2012, 2012
Roberto Hernández	Alumnus	Outstanding Investigative Journalism - Long Form	2011
Blake Sifton	Alumnus	Outstanding Investigative Journalism in a News Magazine	2010
Simcha Jacobovici	Alumnus	Various	2007, 1996, 1995
William Shatner	Alumnus	Various	2005, 2004
Alex Herschlag	Alumni	Outstanding Comedy Series	2000
Jennifer Baichwal	Alumnus	Best Arts Documentary	1999
Kevin Mambo	Alumnus	Outstanding Younger Actor in a Drama Series	1997, 1996
Hume Cronyn	Alumnus	Outstanding Supporting Actor in a Limited or Anthology Series or Movie	1994, 1992, 1990
John Brownstein	Alumni	Outstanding Health or Medical Coverage	2021

=== Pulitzer Prize ===
Name	Affiliation at McGill	Pulitzer Prize	Year
Matthew Rosenberg	Alumnus	National Reporting	2018
John F. Burns	Alumnus	International Reporting	1993, 1997
Charles Krauthammer	Alumnus	Commentary	1987
Leon Edel	Alumnus	Biography or Autobiography	1963

=== Astronauts ===
- Dafydd Williams (BSc 1976, MDCM 1983, MSc 1983, DSc 2007) - mission specialist on two Space Shuttle missions
- Robert Thirsk (MDCM 1982) - holds the Canadian record for the most time spent in space
- Julie Payette (BEng 1986, DSc 2003) - completed two spaceflights, STS-96 and STS-127
- David Saint-Jacques (MedResident 2007) - launched to the International Space Station, on Expeditions 57, 58 and 59
- Jenni Sidey-Gibbons (BEng 2011) - one of the two members of the 2017 CSA Group

=== Academics and scholars ===
- Maude Abbott (BA 1890) - physician and pathologist, authority on congenital heart disease, co-founder of International Academy of Pathology
- Nancy J. Adler – Professor of Organizational Behavior and Samuel Bronfman Chair in Management at McGill University
- Abdolhamid Akbarzadeh Shafaroudi – assistant professor in machine design and mechanical engineering at McGill University
- Selim Akl (MSc 1976, PhD, 1978) – unconventional computer scientist
- Ismail al-Faruqi – Muslim philosopher and comparative religion scholar
- Alia Al-Saji – professor of philosophy
- Antony Alcock (BA 1961) – Ulster historian; actively involved in the negotiations leading up to the Belfast Agreement
- Brian Alters – evolution and education
- Frederick Andermann (BA 1948, BSc 1952) – neuroscientist
- Tom Angus (PhD 1952) - entomologist, deputy director of the federal Forest Pest Management Institute
- Athanasios Asimakopulos (BA 1951, MA 1953) – prominent economist in the Post Keynesian tradition
- Brigitte Askonas (BSc 1944, MSc 1949) – prominent British immunologist
- Karine Auclair – professor of chemistry at McGill University and Canada Research Chair in Antimicrobials and Green Enzymes
- Francis Aveling (BA 1897, MA 1899) – Canadian psychologist, divinity scholar, and Roman Catholic priest
- Sir David Baulcombe, FRS (Postdoc 1978) – British plant scientist and geneticist; now Professor of Botany at the University of Cambridge
- Jill Beck (MA 1976) – dance and choreography scholar, and 15th President of Lawrence University
- Eric Berne (BSc 1931, MD 1935) – psychiatrist, originator of the psychoanalytic theory of transactional analysis
- Raoul Bott (BEng 1945, MEng 1948) – mathematician specializing in topology, Wolf Prize in Mathematics, 2000
- Reuven Brenner – economist; current faculty member
- Ayşe Buğra (PhD 1981) – economist
- Gerald Bull – former professor of mechanical engineering; expert on projectiles; designer of the Iraqi Project Babylon
- Mario Bunge – physicist and philosopher
- Miriam Burland – astronomer at Dominion Observatory from 1927 to 1967
- Ron Burnett (PhD 1981) – president and vice-chancellor, Emily Carr University of Art and Design; former Director of the Graduate Program in Communications, McGill University
- Kenneth Neill Cameron - literary scholar
- Anne Carson – thinker, writer, translator, and University of Michigan classics professor
- Donald Ewen Cameron – psychiatrist, involved with mind control experimentation at McGill
- Thomas Chang (BSc 1957, MD 1961, PhD 1965) – invented and developed world's first artificial cell
- Margaret Ridley Charlton – historian, pioneer librarian, and one of the founders of the Medical Library Association
- Saswati Chatterjee, virologist
- Sherry Chou (MD 2001) – Neurologist and critical care physician at the University of Pittsburgh
- Sujit Choudhry (BSc 1992) – constitutionalist and Dean of the University of California Berkeley, School of Law
- Thomas H. Clark – paleontologist; namesake of the mineral Thomasclarkite
- Terence Coderre (PhD 1985) – Professor of Medicine and the Harold Griffith Chair in Anaesthesia Research at McGill University
- Robert W. Cox (BA 1946) – former United Nations official; a leading authority of the British school of International Political Economy; former professor of political science at Columbia University; current professor emeritus at York University
- R. F. Patrick Cronin (MD 1953) – cardiologist; Dean of the Faculty of Medicine at McGill (1972–1977); healthcare consultant
- Augusto Claudio Cuello – Professor in the Department of Pharmacology and Therapeutics and Charles E. Frosst/Merck Chair in Pharmacology at McGill University
- Philip J. Currie (MSc 1975, PhD 1981) – paleontologist and former curator of the Royal Tyrrell Museum of Palaeontology
- Roger Daley (MSc 1968, PhD 1971) – meteorologist
- Armand de Mestral (BCL 1966) – professor of international law
- Carrie Derick (BEd 1881, BA 1890, MSc 1896) – first woman to become a professor in Canada (in botany at McGill)
- Arti Dhand (PhD 2000) – associate professor at the University of Toronto, Department for the Study of Religion
- Vibert Douglas (PhD 1926) – astrophysicist
- Charles R. Drew (MD 1933) – physician and professor
- Kyle Elliott – Canadian ornithologist, assistant professor in the Department of Natural Resource Sciences at McGill University, and Canada Research Chair in Arctic Ecology.
- Hamid Etemad – professor of international business; business guru and researcher
- Jennifer V. Evans – professor at Carleton University
- Basil Favis - Canadian chemist and professor
- David A. Freedman (BSc 1958) – statistician; professor at University of California, Berkeley
- Grover Furr (BA 1965) – professor of English literature; historical negationist and apologist for Joseph Stalin
- James E. Gill (BSc 1921) – geology professor who introduced the Master's of Applied Science in Mineral Exploration program and established an analytical laboratory for the application of geochemistry to mineral exploration
- Gilbert Girdwood – professor of chemistry; radiologist
- Leo Goldberger (BA 1951, MA 1952) – psychologist, professor at New York University and director of the Research Center for Mental Health, Holocaust survivor
- Lawrence Goodridge, food safety and wastewater monitoring researcher
- Phil Gold (BSc 1957, MSc 1961, M.D. 1961, PhD 1965) – Canadian physician, scientist, and professor. In 1968, he co-discovered the carcinoembryonic antigen (CEA), which resulted in a blood test used in the diagnosis and management of people with cancer.
- David Goltzman (BSc 1966, MD 1968) – endocrinologist, Professor of Medicine and Physiology, and A.G. Massabki Chair in Medicine at McGill University
- Shyamala Gopalan – breast cancer researcher in the Faculty of Medicine and McGill-affiliated Lady Davis Institute for Medical Research; mother of U.S. Vice President Kamala Harris
- Laurie N. Gottlieb, Flora Madeline Shaw Chair of Nursing, Editor-in-Chief of CJNR (Canadian Journal of Nursing Research)
- Jack Gross (PhD 1949) an endocrinologist, one the co-discoverers of Triiodothyronine (T3)
- William W. Happ - (BS) - Silicon transistor pioneer at Shockley Semiconductor Laboratory, and Professor at Arizona State University
- John Harnad (BSc 1967) – Mathematical physicist, Director, Mathematical physics laboratory, Centre de recherches mathématiques
- Stevan Harnad (BA 1967, MA 1969) – Canada Research Chair, Cognitive Sciences; open access and animal rights activist
- S. I. Hayakawa (MA 1928) – linguist, U.S. Senator, and 9th President of San Francisco State University
- Karen S. Haynes (MSW 1970) – American college administrator and social worker, former president of University of Houston–Victoria, and current president of California State University San Marcos
- Donald Olding Hebb (MA, 1932) – father of cognitive psychobiology; pioneer in artificial intelligence; developed concept of Hebbian learning
- John Hemming (BA 1957) – explorer
- Alma Howard (BSc 1934, MSc, 1936, PhD 1938) – radiobiologist
- Fumiko Ikawa-Smith – archaeologist in East Asian and Japanese archaeology & administrator, Director of the Centre for East Asian Studies (1983 and 1988) and Associate Vice-Principal (Academic) of McGill University (1991–1996).
- Herbert Jasper – neuroscientist
- Julian Jaynes (BA 1944) – psychologist, author of The Origin of Consciousness in the Breakdown of the Bicameral Mind
- George Karpati – neuroscientist
- Victoria Kaspi (BSc 1989) – astrophysicist researching neutron stars and pulsars
- Roger Keesing – anthropologist
- Howard Atwood Kelly – member of the faculty of medicine at McGill; one of the "Big Four" founding professors at the Johns Hopkins Hospital, credited with establishing gynecology as a true specialty
- Frances Oldham Kelsey (Bsc 1934, MSc 1935) – pharmacologist and physician
- Samara Klar (BA 2005) – political scientist and founder of Women Also Know Stuff
- Raymond Klibansky – philosopher
- Normand Landry (PhD 2010) – professor of communication at Université TÉLUQ and current Canada Research Chair in Media Education and Human Rights
- Harold Laski – political theorist
- Myrna Lashley – psychologist and professor at McGill
- Gilles J Lavigne – researcher, expert on bruxism, sleep apnea
- Charles Philippe Leblond – pioneer of stem cells, inventor of autoradiography
- Grant LeMarquand (BA 1977, STM 1982, MA 1998) – Canadian Anglican bishop, missionary, and professor at Trinity School for Ministry
- Daniel Levitin – cognitive psychologist
- Pericles Lewis (BA 1990) – founding President of Yale-NUS College; professor of English and comparative literature at Yale University
- Herbert Melville Little (MD 1901) – Gynaecologist, lecturer in obstetrics and gynaecology at McGill, and World War I Army captain
- Abraham S. Luchins – American psychologist known for his research on mental sets (Einstellung effect)
- Michael J. MacKenzie – Professor of Social Work, Psychiatry, and Pediatrics at McGill University, and Canada Research Chair in Child Well-Being
- Michael Mackey – professor of physiology and Joseph Morley Drake Chair in Physiology at McGill University
- Colin MacLeod (MD 1932) – Canadian-American geneticist; discovered DNA breakthroughs
- James Mallory – for many years Canada's leading constitutional scholar
- Joseph Boyd Martin – former Dean of the Harvard Medical School; former Dean and Chancellor at the University of California, San Francisco; former chair of neurology and neurosurgery at the Montreal Neurological Institute
- Anna McPherson, physicist and the first female professor in the Department of Physics
- Michael Meaney – pioneer of epigenetics; James McGill Professor, Departments of Psychiatry and Neurology and Neurosurgery.
- Ronald Melzack (BA, 1950, MSc 1951, PhD 1954) – developed the McGill Pain Questionnaire
- Ravi S. Menon (MSc(A), 1986) - Canadian-American biophysicist involved in the development of functional magnetic resonance imaging, Professor at The University of Western Ontario.
- Donna Mergler (PhD, 1973) – neuro-physiologist specializing in environmental effects of neurotoxins
- John S. Meyer (MD 1948, MSc 1949) – neurology professor and Chairman of the U.S. President's Commission on Heart Disease, Cancer and Stroke
- Brenda Milner (MA 1949, PhD 1952) – provided the first clear demonstration of the existence of multiple memory systems in the brain with patient H.M.
- Henry Mintzberg (BEng 1961) – business guru
- Mortimer Mishkin (MA 1949, PhD 1951) – renowned neuropsychologist for path-breaking work on brain-processing of memories and 2009 National Medal of Science recipient
- Albert Moll (LLB 1932, MD 1937) – professor of psychiatry; pioneer of psychiatric day treatment
- Marie-Eve Morin – Canadian philosopher and Professor of Philosophy
- Karl Moore – associate professor of management at McGill University
- Audrey Moores - professor of chemistry and Tier II Canada Research Chair
- William Reginald Morse, MD, one of four medical missionaries who founded the West China Union University in Chengdu, Sichuan, in 1914; went on to become dean of the medical faculty and, later, assistant researcher at the Peabody Museum, where he advanced studies of Chinese and Tibetan medicine
- Beverley Pearson Murphy, endocrinologist and professor
- Jennifer G. Murphy (BS 2000) – Professor of chemistry at University of Toronto
- Ivan R. Nabi (PhD 1989) - cell biologist and professor at University of British Columbia.
- E. R. Ward Neale (BSc 1949) – geologist, professor at Memorial University of Newfoundland
- Mona Nemer (PhD 1992) – Chief Science Adviser of Canada, 2017–present
- Louis Nirenberg (BS 1945) – mathematician; 1995 National Medal of Science recipient and winner of 2015 Abel Prize
- Percy Erskine Nobbs – former professor of architecture; designer of many buildings in Montreal, especially at McGill, and in Alberta, British Columbia, and South Africa
- James Olds (Postdoc 1955) – neuroscientist and psychologist; co-discovered the reward center of the brain; a founder of modern neuroscience
- Kelvin Ogilvie – McGill chemistry professor 1974–87; expert in biotechnology, bioorganic chemistry, genetic engineering
- Santa J. Ono (PhD 1991) – immunologist; 15th President & Vice-Chancellor of The University of British Columbia; 28th President of The University of Cincinnati; 15th President of the University of Michigan; discovered NFX1 RING Finger motif; showed HMGA2 truncation drives mesenchymal tumor development
- William Osler (MD 1872) – McGill professor; medical pioneer; developed the modern form of a doctor's bedside manner; a founder of the Johns Hopkins School of Medicine at Johns Hopkins University
- Martin Ostoja-Starzewski – engineering scientist, specializing in stochastic mechanics, thermomechanics, and wave propagation
- Gilles Paradis – public health and preventive medicine physician at the Institut national de santé publique du Québec, as well as professor in the Department of Epidemiology, Biostatistics, and Occupational Health and Strathcona Chair in Epidemiology at McGill University.
- Madhu Pai – Canada Research Chair of Epidemiology and Global Health at McGill University
- Antony Page (B.Comm., 1988) - dean of the Florida International University College of Law
- Johanne Paradis (PhD 1997), Canadian language scientist, researcher
- Arthur Lindo Patterson (BSc 1923, MSc 1924, PhD 1928) – physicist
- Jordan Peterson (PhD 1991, Postdoc 1993) – clinical psychologist, cultural critic, and psychology professor currently at the University of Toronto
- Kevin Petrecca – neurosurgical oncologist at the Montreal Neurological Institute, chief of neurosurgery at the MUHC, associate professor of neurology and neurosurgery and William Feindel Chair in Neuro-Oncology at McGill University
- Wilder Penfield – neurosurgery pioneer; first director of the Montreal Neurological Institute and Montreal Neurological Hospital, which are affiliated with McGill University
- Stephen R. Perry, John J. O'Brien Professor of Law and Professor of Philosophy at the University of Pennsylvania Law School
- Steven Pinker (BA 1976) – cognitive psychologist; author of The Blank Slate, How the Mind Works
- Susan Pinker (BA 1979) – psychologist; author of The Sexual Paradox
- Jeremy Quastel – mathematician specializing in probability theory and PDEs, currently professor at the University of Toronto
- Judah Hirsch Quastel – biochemist; pioneer in neurochemistry and soil metabolism; Director of the McGill University-Montreal General Hospital Research Institute
- Amélie Quesnel-Vallée – associate professor with joint appointment in the Departments of Sociology and Epidemiology, and Canada Research Chair in Policies and Health Inequalities at McGill
- Fazlur Rahman – Islamic philosopher
- James R. Reid (BA 1881, MDiv 1883) – theologian and president of College of Montana (1889–1893) and Montana State University (1894–1904)
- Richard Birdsall Rogers (BEng 1878) – civil engineer and designer of the Peterborough Lift Lock
- Mary Laura Chalk Rowles (BSc 1925, MSc 1926, PhD 1928) – physicist
- Christopher E. Rudd (BSc 1978) – immunologist; professor at Harvard and Cambridge
- Witold Rybczynski (BArch 1966, MArch 1972) – Scottish-born McGill-trained architect and internationally known writer and critic
- Gad Saad (born 1964) - Lebanese-born Canadian evolutionary behavioral scientist
- Philip Carl Salzman – anthropologist
- Joseph A. Schwarcz (BSc 1969, PhD 1973) – chemist, science popularizer, science journalist
- Hans Selye — (DSc, 1942) Hungarian-Canadian endocrinologist, pioneered studies on the effects of stress on the human body.
- Justine Sergent (BA, 1973, MSc 1979, PhD 1982) – neuroscientist
- Bernard Shapiro (BA, 1956) – Ethics Commissioner of Canada; former Principal of McGill and Deputy Education Minister of Ontario; twin brother of Harold Shapiro
- Harold Shapiro (BA, 1956, MA 1959) – former president of Princeton University; former president of the University of Michigan; twin brother of Bernard Shapiro
- Judith N. Shklar (BA, 1949, MA 1950) – Latvian-born American political scientist, John Cowles Professor of Government at Harvard, and first woman president of the American Political Science Association (APSA)
- Vera Shlakman (BA 1930, MA 1931) – professor of economics, noted Marxist scholar, and author of famous book on women factory workers
- Jenni Sidey (BEng 2011) – Canadian astronaut, engineer, and lecturer.
- Upinder Singh (PhD 1990) – Indian historian
- Nahum Sonenberg – Israeli Canadian microbiologist and biochemist. He is a James McGill professor of biochemistry
- M. R. Srinivasan (MEng 1952, PhD 1954) – Indian Nuclear Physicist
- Moshe Szyf – geneticist, pioneer of epigenetics; James McGill professor of pharmacology and therapeutics.
- Charles Taylor (BA 1952) – writer, philosopher, and political theorist; 2007 winner of the Templeton Prize
- Karen Teff (PhD 1988) - biologist and geneticist
- Demetri Terzopoulos FRS FRSC (BEng 1978, MEng 1980) - Academy Award winning Greek-Canadian-American computer scientist, university professor, author, and entrepreneur
- Marc Tessier-Lavigne (BSc 1980) – 11th president of Stanford University; former president of Rockefeller University; Rhodes scholar
- Wendy Thomson - former head of School of Social Work and current vice-chancellor of University of London, 2019-
- Lionel Tiger (BA 1959) – best-selling author; Darwin Professor of Anthropology at Rutgers University
- Peter Todd (BCom 1983) – former dean of McGill's Desautels Faculty of Management, dean of HEC Paris
- Stephen Toope (BCL, 1983 LLB, 1983) – Vice-Chancellor of the University of Cambridge (2017–), President of the University of British Columbia (2006–2014)
- Bruce Trigger – OC OQ FRSC (18 June 1937 – 1 December 2006) archaeologist, anthropologist, and ethnohistorian. James McGill Professor (2001–2006), Professor McGill University (1967–2006).
- Tom Velk – monetary economics and public policy professor
- Manuella Vincter - particle physicist, professor at Carleton University, deputy spokesperson of the ATLAS experiment
- Jacob Viner (BA 1914) – professor; early leader of the Chicago school of economics
- Robert Vogel (academic) - professor; Dean of Faculty of Arts of McGill University
- Alice Vrielink – Head of Discipline in Biochemistry and Molecular Biology at the University of Western Australia; conducts research in crystallography
- Immanuel Wallerstein – former professor of sociology (1971–1976); political scientist, known for the World Systems Theory
- Jagannath Wani (PhD 1967) – statistics professor and philanthropist focusing on mental illness awareness
- Frank T. M. White – Foundation Professor, Mining and Metallurgical Engineering, University of Queensland; Macdonald Professor of Mining Engineering and Applied Geophysics, McGill University
- Franklin White (MD 1969) – scholar-practitioner; former president, Canadian Public Health Association; 1997 Medal of Honor from the Pan American Health Organization (PAHO/WHO)
- Andrew B. Wittkower (BS 1955) – physicist and IEEE fellow
- Joseph Wong, Vice President, International, University of Toronto
- William Wright (DMC 1848) – first person of colour to obtain a medical degree in Canada and first to be a professor; professor, McGill Medical Faculty, 1854-1883.
- Tim Wu (BSc 1995) – professor at Columbia Law School; adviser for the New York State Attorney General
- Leo Yaffe (PhD 1943) - nuclear chemist
- Bernard P. Zeigler (BEng 1962) – a Canadian engineer and emeritus professor at the University of Arizona, known for inventing Discrete Event System Specification (DEVS) in 1976.
- Hans Zingg (PhD) – Professor Emeritus of Pharmacology and Therapeutics, Professor of Medicine, Professor of Obstetrics and Gynecology, and Wyeth-Ayerst Chair in Women's Health at McGill
- Bernard Zinman (MD) – research endocrinologist, clinician, and diabetes expert
- Eva Kushner OC FRSC (BA, MA, PhD) - a scholar of literature and the first female president of a Canadian University (Victoria University).

=== Business and media ===
- Suhayya Abu-Hakima – co-founder and CEO of AmikaNow! and Amika Mobile Corporation
- Noubar Afeyan ― one of two Canadian co-founders of Moderna, Inc.
- Vinod Agarwal – founder and former chairman of LogicVision ($100 million NASDAQ traded company)
- Suroosh Alvi – journalist, filmmaker, and co-founder of VICE magazine
- Peyush Bansal- co-founder and CEO at Lenskart, an Indian unicorn. Investor at Shark Tank India.
- Aldo Bensadoun – founder and CEO of the ALDO Group
- Conrad Black – imprisoned press baron and media tycoon in the Anglo-Canadian tradition of Lord Beaverbrook and Lord Thomson of Fleet; owner of 650 dailies/weeklies around the world
- Nigel Braun – YouTuber and chemist
- Thomas Brag – co-founder of Yes Theory
- Charles Bronfman – philanthropist; former co-chairman of Seagram Distillers
- Edgar Bronfman, Sr. – former CEO of Seagram
- Kitra Cahana - Peabody award-winning documentary filmmaker and documentary photographer
- John Cleghorn – former chairman of the Royal Bank of Canada, the largest bank in Canada; currently chairman of SNC-Lavalin group
- Jim Coleman (1911–2001), Canadian sports journalist, writer and press secretary
- Jean Coutu – businessman; billionaire; founder and CEO of Jean Coutu Group
- Matt Dahlia – co-founder of Yes Theory
- Paul Desmarais, Jr. – chairman of Power Corporation
- Ritika Dutt – CEO and co-founder of Botler AI
- Gad Elmaleh – French comedian
- Darren Entwistle – president and chief executive officer of Telus
- Stéphanie Fillion - Award-winning French-Canadian reporter and United Nations correspondent
- Adam Gopnik – staff writer for The New Yorker magazine
- Céline Galipeau – weekday anchor of Ici Radio-Canada Télé's Le Téléjournal
- Satheeshkumar Kumarasingam, President Pratt & Whitney Canada
- Kuok Khoon Hong – Singaporean billionaire and co-founder of Wilmar International
- Dick Irvin, Jr. – sports broadcaster and author; second longest serving member of CBC's Hockey Night in Canada (after Bob Cole)
- Hubert Lacroix – president and CEO of the Canadian Broadcasting Corporation
- David Lawee – partner and founder of Google Capital
- John MacBain – founder, CEO and president of Trader Classified Media
- Shahid Mahmood – political cartoonist
- Scott McDonald – CEO of Oliver Wyman
- Don McGowan – television personality, weatherman and host at CFCF-DT
- Thomas S. Monahan – president and CEO of CIBC Mellon
- Claude Mongeau – CEO and president of the Canadian National Railway
- Harley Morenstein – host and co-creator of Epic Meal Time
- Andy Nulman – co-founder of Just for Laughs
- Mark Phillips – CBS News London bureau correspondent since 1982, formerly CBC News London correspondent
- Elizabeth Plank – Vox video blogger and online journalist
- Robert Rabinovitch – president and CEO of the Canadian Broadcasting Corporation
- Jade Raymond video game producer at Ubisoft; co-host of G4TV's Electronic Playground
- Matthew Rosenberg – Washington correspondent at The New York Times, and national security analyst for CNN
- John Roth – former CEO of Nortel Networks
- Calin Rovinescu – president and CEO of Air Canada
- Claire Saffitz – American pastry chef, food writer and YouTube personality
- Sugar Sammy - Canadian comedian
- Seymour Schulich – benefactor to the Schulich School of Music at McGill and Schulich School of Business, York University
- Allan Scott – writer-producer of more than 20 feature films, including Don't Look Now, voted the best British film of all time; wrote Priscilla, Queen of the Desert; as chairman of Macallan-Glenlivet, he turned Macallan into a world-leading malt whisky
- Savik Shuster – TV journalist working for Ukrainian television
- Evan Solomon – political journalist and radio host on SiriusXM Canada, columnist for Maclean's
- Helga Stephenson – interim CEO of the Academy of Canadian Cinema and Television
- Ziya Tong – television personality and co-host of Daily Planet
- Lorne Trottier – founder of Matrox Electronic Systems
- Ivana Trump – Czech-American businesswoman and former fashion model, ex-wife of President Donald Trump
- Les Vadasz – founding member of Intel Corporation
- Zain Verjee – co-anchor of CNN International's European morning program World Report
- Michelle Zatlyn – co-founder, president, and COO of Cloudflare
- Moses Znaimer – co-founder and former president and executive producer of CityTV; chairman and Executive Producer of the Access Media Group
- Mort Zuckerman – CEO of Atlantic Monthly Corporation and publisher of U.S. News & World Report
- Changpeng Zhao - founder and CEO of Binance, the world's largest cryptocurrency exchange.
- Syed Zohaib Asad – Pakistani educator and entrepreneur; founder of Zohaib Asad Academies. He received public recognition in Pakistan after earning 28 A grades in the Cambridge International O Level examinations in 2011 and subsequently studied Economics and International Development at McGill University (2011–2015)."Pakistan Tribune - Pakistani PM honours student who set O-level world record". McGill University. 10 January 2012."PM honours student who set O-level world record". The Express Tribune. 5 January 2012.

=== Billionaires ===
Name	Affiliation at McGill	Degree
Changpeng Zhao	Alumnus	BSc, Computer Science
Pierre Beaudoin	Alumnus	BSc, Engineering/Industrial Relations
Mortimer Zuckerman	Alumnus	BA, BCL
Michelle Zatlyn	Alumnus	BS, Chemistry
Catherine Phillips	Alumnus	PhD, Clinical Psychology
John McCall MacBain	Alumnus	BA, Economics
Michael Latifi	Alumnus	BS, MBA
Aldo Bensadoun	Alumnus	BA, Commerce
Charles Bronfman	Alumnus	BA, Economics and Political Science
Eric Molson	Alumnus	MA, Economics
Edgar Bronfman Sr.	Alumnus	BA, Commerce
Victor Dahdaleh	Alumnus	BS
Noubar Afeyan	Alumnus	BEng, Chemical Engineering
Larry Rossy	Alumnus	BA, Commerce
Ned Goodman	Alumnus	BS, Geology
Jean Coutu	Alumnus	BA, Business Administration
Kuok Khoon Hong	Alumnus	BA, Commerce
Seymour Schulich	Alumnus	BSc, MBA
George Garvin Brown IV	Alumnus	BA, Political Science
Paul Desmarais Jr.	Alumnus	BA, Commerce

=== Politics and government ===
==== Canadian politicians and civil servants ====
McGill alumni have held and continue to hold many positions at the federal and provincial levels in Canadian politics:

===== Governors-General of Canada =====
- Julie Payette (BEng 1986) – Governor General of Canada, 2017–2021; former Canadian Space Agency astronaut
- David Lloyd Johnston (LLD 2000) – Governor General of Canada, 2010–2017; former McGill principal; former head of the Board of Overseers at Harvard University; former president of the University of Waterloo, 1999–2011

===== Prime ministers =====
- Sir John Abbott (BCL 1854) – third Prime Minister of Canada and first to be born in Canada
- Sir Wilfrid Laurier (BCL 1864) – seventh Prime Minister of Canada
- Justin Trudeau (BA 1994) – 23rd Prime Minister of Canada

===== Cabinet ministers and members of parliament =====
- Chris Alexander (BA 1989) – Minister of Citizenship and Immigration, 2013–2015; previously Canadian ambassador to Afghanistan, 2003–2005
- Warren Allmand (BCL 1952) – served variously as Solicitor General, Minister of Indian Affairs and Northern Development, and Minister of Consumer and Corporate Affairs between 1972 and 1979
- Steven Blaney (Cert Mgmt 1991) – Minister of Public Safety and Emergency Preparedness, 2013–2015
- Jim Carr (BA 1979) – Minister of Natural Resources, 2015–
- Brooke Claxton (BCL 1946) – Minister of Health, 1943–1946; Minister of National Defence, 1946–1954
- Irwin Cotler (BA 1961, BCL 1964) – Minister of Justice and Attorney General, 2003–2006
- Charles Doherty (BCL 1876, Hon. LLD 1913) – Minister of Justice and Attorney General, 1911–1921
- Charles Drury (BCL 1936) – Minister of Finance, Defence, Public Works, Industry, President of the Treasury Board
- Sydney Arthur Fisher (BA 1868)— Minister of Agriculture, 1896–1911
- Karina Gould (BA 2010) – Minister of Democratic Institutions, 2017–present
- Herb Gray (BCom 1952) – Deputy Prime Minister of Canada, 1997–2002
- Don Johnston (BA 1955, BCL 1958) – Minister of State for Science and Technology, Minister of State for Economic and Regional Development, and Minister of Justice and Attorney General of Canada
- Robert Layton (BA 1947) – Minister of State for Mines, 1984–1988
- John McCallum (PhD 1977) – Minister of Immigration, Refugees and Citizenship of Canada since 2015; former Dean of the Faculty of Arts of McGill University
- David Lametti (BCL/LLB 1989) – Minister of Justice, 2019–
- Catherine McKenna (LLB 1999) – Minister of the Environment and Climate Change, 2015–
- Frederick Debartzch Monk (BCL 1877) – Minister of Public Works, 1911–1912
- Joe Oliver (BA 1961, BCL 1964) – Minister of Finance, 2014–2015
- Jim Peterson (DCL 1970) – Minister of International Trade, 2003–2006
- Greg Rickford (BCL/LLB 2005) – Minister of Natural Resources, 2014–2015
- Richard Fadden (BA 1973) – former Deputy Minister of National Defence and National Security Advisor
- John Joseph Curran (LLB 1862) – first Solicitor General of Canada
- Jonathan Wilkinson (MA 1992)
- Nick Whalen (LLB 2011) Lawyer and former MP for the Liberal
- Julie Dzerowicz (Bcom 1994)
- Arif Virani (BA 1994)
- Julie Dabrusin (BA 1994)
- Angelo Iacono (BA 1988)
- Steven Blaney (Cert Mgmt 1991)
- Matthew Dubé (BA 2011)
- Brenda Shanahan (BSW 2007)
- Michael Levitt (politician) (Arts 1993)
- Francis Scarpaleggia (BA 1979)
- Sherry Romanado (Cert PR Mgmt 2005)
- Anthony Housefather (BCL/LLB 1993)
- Thomas Mulcair (BCL 1976, LLB 1977)
- Will Amos (BCL/LLB 2004)
- Peter Schiefke (MSc 2011)
- Marc Miller (BCL/LLB 2001) Lawyer and MP for the Liberal current Minister of Indigenous Services in the Federal Cabinet
- Joël Lightbound (BCL/LLB 2011), Liberal politician, MP for the riding of Louis-Hébert.
- Emmanuella Lambropoulos (BEd 2013)
- Raquel Dancho (BA 2014)
- Mylène Freeman (BA 2011)
- Charmaine Borg (BA 2011)
- Laurin Liu (BA 2011)

===== Supreme Court justices =====
- Douglas Abbott (BCL 1918) – appointed to the Court in 1954, previously Minister of National Defence and Minister of Finance
- Ian Binnie (BA 1960) – appointed to the Court in 1998, formerly Associate Deputy Minister of Justice
- Louis-Philippe de Grandpré (BCL 1938) – appointed to the Court in 1974, formerly president of the Canadian Bar Association
- Marie Deschamps (LLM 1983) – appointed to the Court in 2002, previously a Judge on the Quebec Court of Appeal
- Gérald Fauteux – appointed to the Court in 1949, previously dean of the Faculty of Law.
- Morris Fish (BA 1959, BCL 1962) – appointed to the Court in 2003, previously a Judge on the Quebec Court of Appeal
- Clément Gascon (BCL 1981) – appointed to the Court in 2014, previously a Judge on the Quebec Court of Appeal
- Désiré Girouard (BCL 1860) – appointed to the Court in 1895, previously member of Parliament
- Charles Gonthier (BCL 1951) – served on the Supreme Court 1989–2003
- Mahmud Jamal (BCL’93, LLB’93), puisne justice of the Supreme Court of Canada — appointed to the Court in 2021, previously a Judge on the Court of Appeal for Ontario
- Glenn Joyal (LLB 1986) - appointed to the Court in 2026, previously Chief Justice of the Court of King's Bench of Manitoba
- Nicholas Kasirer (BCL, LLB 1985) – appointed to the court in 2019, previously a judge on the Quebec Court of Appeal
- Gerald Le Dain (BCL 1949) – appointed to the Court in 1984, previously a Judge on the Federal Court of Appeal
- Sheilah Martin (BCL, LLB, 1981), – appointed to the Court in 2017, previously judge of the Court of Appeal of Alberta
- Pierre-Basile Mignault (BCL 1878) – appointed to the Court in 1918, previously President of the Bar of Montréal
- Thibaudeau Rinfret (BCL 1900) – appointed to the Court in 1924, previously a Judge on the Superior Court of Quebec

===== Senators =====
- Albert Joseph Brown (BA 1883, BCL 1886) – Senator for Wellington, 1932–1938
- Henry Joseph Cloran (BCL 1883) – Senator for Victoria, Quebec, 1903–1928
- Sheila Finestone (BSc 1947) – appointed to the Senate of Canada in 1999
- Joan Fraser (BA 1965) – appointed to the Canadian Senate in 1998
- Linda Frum (BA 1984) – appointed to the Senate in 2009
- Marc Gold (BA 1972) – current Senator for Stadacona, Quebec
- Sir William Hales Hingston (MD CM 1851) – Senator for Rougemont, 1896–1907; Mayor of Montreal, 1875–1877
- James Horace King (MD CM 1895) – Leader of the Government in the Senate, 1942–1945
- Michael Meighen (BA 1960) – appointed to the Senate in 1990
- Vivienne Poy (BA 1962) – appointed to the Senate in 1998
- Larry Smith (BCL 1976) – appointed to the Senate in 2011 and Leader of the Opposition in the Senate
- Leo Housakos (BA 1992) – incumbent Senator for Wellington, Quebec and former Speaker of the Senate of Canada
- James Edwin Robertson (BA 1865) – Member of Parliament and Senator for Prince Edward Island
- Michael Pitfield (LLB 1959) – Senator for Ottawa-Vanier, Ontario
- Joan Fraser (BA 1965) – Senator for De Lorimier, Quebec
- John Caswell Davis (BEng 1910) – Senator for Winnipeg, Manitoba
- Charles Boucher de Boucherville (MD 1843) – third Premier of Quebec and Senator for Montarville, Quebec
- Sarto Fournier (LLB 1937) – Member of Parliament, 38th Mayor of Montreal, and Senator for De Lanaudière, Quebec
- Théodore Robitaille (MD 1858) – Member of Parliament, and Senator for Gulf, Quebec

===== Members of Parliament (House of Commons) =====
- Tom Mulcair (BCL 1976, LLB 1977): Leader of the New Democratic Party, Leader of the Opposition, and Member of Parliament for Outremont, Quebec
- Marc Miller (BCL, LLB 2001): Current Member of Parliament for Ville-Marie—Le Sud-Ouest—Île-des-Sœurs, Quebec, and Parliamentary Secretary to the Minister of Crown–Indigenous Relations
- David Lametti (BCL 1989, LLB 1989): Current Member of Parliament for LaSalle—Émard—Verdun, Quebec, and Parliamentary Secretary to the Minister of Innovation, Science and Economic Development
- Arif Virani (BA 1994): Current Member of Parliament for Parkdale—High Park, Ontario, and Parliamentary Secretary to the Minister of Justice and Attorney General of Canada
- Murray Rankin (BA 1972): Former Member of Parliament for Victoria, British Columbia, and current Member of the Legislative Assembly of British Columbia for Oak Bay-Gordon Head and British Columbia Minister of Indigenous Relations and Reconciliation
- Anthony Housefather (BCL, LLB 1993): Current Member of Parliament for Mount Royal, Quebec, and chair of the House of Commons Standing Committee on Justice and Human Rights
- Albina Guarnieri (MA 1979): Member of Parliament for Mississauga East and Mississauga East—Cooksville, Ontario
- George MacKinnon (MD 1902): Member of Parliament for Kootenay East, British Columbia
- Christophe-Alphonse Geoffrion (BCL 1866): Member of Parliament for Verchères, Quebec
- Joseph Alexandre Camille Madore (BCL 1880): Member of Parliament for Hochelaga, Quebec
- Jack Layton (BA 1969): Leader of the New Democratic Party, Leader of the Opposition, and Member of Parliament for Toronto—Danforth, Ontario
- Samuel William Jacobs (BCL 1893): Member of Parliament for George-Étienne Cartier and Cartier, Quebec
- Alan Macnaughton (BA 1924, BCL 1927): Member of Parliament for Mount Royal, Quebec, and Speaker of the House of Commons
- Thomas d'Arcy McGee (BCL 1861): A Father of the Canadian Confederation and prominent Member of Parliament for Montreal West, Quebec
- The "McGill 5": Five then-current McGill students who were elected as NDP MPs in 2011:
  - Charmaine Borg (BA 2011): MP for Terrebonne—Blainville (2011–2015)
  - Matthew Dubé (BA 2011): MP for Beloeil—Chambly (Chambly—Borduas until 2015) (2011–2019)
  - Mylène Freeman (BA 2011): MP for Argenteuil—Papineau—Mirabel (2011–2015)
  - Laurin Liu (BA 2016): MP for Rivière-des-Mille-Îles (2011–2015)
  - Jamie Nicholls (PhD cand 2017): MP for Vaudreuil—Soulanges (2011–2015)

===== Auditors-general =====
- Denis Desautels (BCom 1964) – auditor general, 1991–2001
- Sheila Fraser (BCom 1972) – first female auditor general of Canada

===== Ambassadors =====
- Chris Alexander (BA 1989) – ambassador to Afghanistan
- Élaine Ayotte (MA 1990) – ambassador and permanent delegate to the UNESCO
- Frederic Bertley (BSc 1994, PhD 1999) – ambassador to Senegal
- Yves Fortier (BCL 1958) – ambassador to the United Nations
- Robert Fowler (BA 1966) – ambassador to the United Nations and Under-Secretary-General of the United Nations
- Arnold Heeney (BCL 1927) – ambassador to the United States and NATO
- Kirsten Hillman (BCL/LLB) - ambassador to the United States, 2020-
- John McCallum (PhD 1977) – ambassador to China
- Andrew McNaughton (BA 1910, MSc 1912) – ambassador to the United Nations and President of the UN Security Council
- Sydney David Pierce (BA 1922, BCL 1925) – ambassador to Brazil, Belgium, Luxembourg, Mexico, and the OECD
- John Rankin (LLM) – former British ambassador to Nepal; Governor of Bermuda; current British Governor of British Virgin Islands
- Gordon Smith (BA 1968) – Ambassador to the European Union and NATO
- David Wright (BA 1966) – Ambassador to Spain and NATO
- James R. Wright (BA 1970) – ambassador (high commissioner) to the United Kingdom

===== Heads of financial institutions =====
- Graham Towers (BA 1919) – first and founding Governor of the Bank of Canada (1934–1955) and Governor for Canada at the International Monetary Fund
- Marcel Massé (LLB 1961) – Member of Parliament, President of the Treasury Board, and President of the Canadian International Development Agency
- Sylvia Ostry (BA 1948, MA 1950) – chairman, Economic Council of Canada

===== Others =====
- Adrien Arcand – fascist politician, writer, journalist who founded and led the National Unity Party of Canada
- Gerald Butts (BA 1993, MA 1996) – current Principal Secretary to the Prime Minister of Canada, 2015–
- Sir Charles Boucher de Boucherville (MD 1843) – Premier of Quebec, 1874–1878, 1891–1892
- Ian Brodie (BA 1990) – Chief of Staff in the government of Prime Minister Stephen Harper, 2006–2008
- Neil Brown, Q.C. (PhD. 1973) – Alberta MLA
- Rosemary Brown – first Black Canadian woman to be elected to a provincial legislature
- James Campbell Clouston (BEng 1918) – Canadian officer in the British Royal Navy, who acted as pier-master during the Dunkirk evacuation; inspiration for Kenneth Branagh's pier-master character in Christopher Nolan's 2017 film Dunkirk
- May Cutler (BA 1945, MA 1951) – first woman to serve as Mayor of Westmount, Quebec (1987–1991); founder of Tundra Books; first female Canadian publisher of children's books
- Sir Charles Peers Davidson (BA 1864, MA 1867, BCL 1873, DCL 1875, Hon. LLD 1912) – Chief Justice of the Quebec Superior Court, 1912–1915
- Henry Thomas Duffy (BA 1876, BCL 1879) – Minister of Public Works and Treasurer of Quebec
- Brian Gallant (LLM 2011) – Premier of New Brunswick, 2014–
- R. A. E. Greenshields (BA 1883, BCL 1885) – Chief Justice of the Superior Court of the Province of Quebec, 1929–1942
- Don Johnston (BCL 1958, BA 1960) – former Secretary General of the OECD
- Carlos Leitão (BA 1979) – Minister of Finance of Quebec, 2014–
- David Lewis (BA and LLD) – Rhodes Scholar and former leader of the New Democratic Party (1971–75)
- Alexander Cameron Rutherford (BA, LLB 1881) – first premier of Alberta, founder of the University of Alberta
- Bernard Shapiro (BA 1956) – Federal Ethics Commissioner, 2004–2007
- Marie-Claire Kirkland Strover (BA 1947, BCL 1950) – first woman elected to the Quebec National Assembly, serving between 1966 and 1973.

==== Foreign politicians and other government officials ====
McGill alumni have held and continue to hold many top government positions in other countries:

===== Foreign heads of state/government =====
- Paula Cox (BA 1985) – former prime minister of Bermuda
- Timothy Harris (PhD 2001) – current Prime Minister of Saint Kitts and Nevis
- Joni Madraiwiwi (LLM 1989; DipA&SL 1988) – former acting president and vice-president of the Republic of Fiji and Chief Justice of the Supreme Court of the Republic of Nauru
- Jacqui Quinn-Leandro (PhD 2003) – first female (acting) prime minister of Antigua and Barbuda, and cabinet member (Minister of Education, Minister of Labour, and Minister of Public Service)
- Michael Manley (BA 1943) – former prime minister of Jamaica, and former member of the Senate and House of Representatives in the Parliament of Jamaica
- Ahmed Nazif (PhD 1983) – former prime minister of Egypt
- John Rankin (LLM 1984) – current Governor-General of Bermuda
- Daniel Oduber Quirós (MA 1945) – former president of Costa Rica
- Vaira Vīķe-Freiberga (PhD 1965) – former president of Latvia; first female president of Latvia

===== Cabinet members =====
- Mukti Ali (MA 1960s) – Minister of Religious Affairs of The Republic of Indonesia, 1971-1978
- Zbigniew Brzezinski (BA 1949; MA 1950) – former National Security Advisor (with Cabinet rank) to President Jimmy Carter
- Peter Murcott Bunting (BEng 1983) – current Minister of National Security of Jamaica
- Warren Randolph Burgess (MA 1915) – former United States Undersecretary of the Treasury and United States Ambassador to NATO
- Miguel Castilla (BA 1991) – current Minister of Economy and Finance of Peru
- Stephen Chebrot (MSc 2009) – current Minister for Transport in the Ugandan Cabinet and incumbent Member of the Parliament of Uganda, and former Ugandan Ambassador to India
- Bernard Chidzero (PhD 1958) – Minister of Finance of Zimbabwe, 1985–1995
- Peng Ming-min (MA 1952) – senior adviser (with cabinet rank) to the president of Taiwan, and former presidential candidate in Taiwan
- Jacqui Quinn-Leandro (PhD 2003) – first female (acting) prime minister of Antigua and Barbuda, and cabinet member (Minister of Education, Minister of Labour, and Minister of Public Service)
- Hamdillah Abdul Wahab (BEng 1974) – former Deputy Minister of Industry and Primary Resources
- Michael Žantovský (MA 1975) – Press Secretary and Presidential Spokesman of the Czech Republic
- Euan Howard, 4th Baron Strathcona and Mount Royal (BEng 1951) – British Minister of State for Defence, 1979–1981
- Jamaluddin Jarjis (PhD 1980) – former Malaysian ambassador to the United States and Minister of Science, Technology, and Innovation
- Dov Yosef (BA 1921) – Minister of Justice, Minister of Trade and Industry, and Minister of Health of the State of Israel
- Malik Amin Aslam (MBA 1993) – former Pakistani Minister of State for the Environment and current advisor to the prime minister for Climate Change (with Cabinet rank)
- Dominique Dupuy (BA 2012) - Minister of Foreign Affairs, Religious Affairs, and Haitians Abroad of Haiti

===== Legislators =====
- Wong Yuk-shan (MSc 1976; PhD 1979) – former Member (deputy) of the National People's Congress of the People's Republic of China
- Gilbert Cooper (BCom 1924) – former mayor of Hamilton, Bermuda and member of the House of Assembly of Bermuda
- S. I. Hayakawa (MA 1928) – U.S. Senator from California
- James McCleary (BA 1874) – U.S. Congressman representing Minnesota in the United States House of Representatives
- Joseph J. O'Brien (BA 1917) – U.S. Congressman representing New York in the United States House of Representatives
- Chase G. Woodhouse (BA 1912; MA 1914) – U.S. Congresswoman representing Connecticut in the United States House of Representatives
- Carlos Heredia (MA 1985) – Member of the Congress of Mexico and Governor of the State of Michoacán in Mexico
- Gordon Wasserman, Baron Wasserman (BA 1959) – Member of the House of Lords in the British Parliament and life peer, and internationally recognized policing advisor
- Conrad Black (MA 1973) – Member of the House of Lords in the British Parliament and life peer, and publisher of The Daily Telegraph (UK), Chicago Sun-Times (U.S.), The Jerusalem Post (Israel), National Post (Canada)
- Euan Howard, 4th Baron Strathcona and Mount Royal (BEng 1951) – Member of the House of Lords in the British Parliament
- Andrew Hamilton Gault (BA 1902) – Conservative Member of the House of Commons in the British Parliament for Taunton, Somerset, UK (1924–1935); raised Princess Patricia's Canadian Light Infantry, the last privately raised regiment in the British Empire; bequeathed his Mont Saint-Hilaire estate to McGill in 1958
- Maurice Alexander (BA 1908; BCL 1910) – Liberal Member of the House of Commons in the British Parliament for Southwark South East, UK
- Gavin Henderson, 2nd Baron Faringdon (BA 1922) – former member of the London County Council, Chairman of the Fabian Society, 1960–1961
- Dhanayshar Mahabir (MA 1985; PhD 1994) – Senator of the Republic of Trinidad and Tobago
- Jacqui Quinn-Leandro (PhD 2003) – first woman elected to the House of Representatives, and later elected as Senator, in the Parliament of Antigua and Barbuda
- Ramasamy Palanisamy (MA 1980) – current Member of the Parliament of Malaysia
- Hidipo Hamutenya (MA 1971) – Member of the National Assembly of Namibia and cabinet member (Minister of Information and Broadcasting, Minister of Trade and Industry, and Minister of Foreign Affairs) of Namibia
- Michael Žantovský (MA 1975) – ambassador of Czechoslovakia/Czech Republic to the United States, Israel, and the United Kingdom, and Senator in the Parliament of the Czech Republic
- Rıza Türmen (LLM 1980) – former Member of the Turkish Parliament and Turkish Ambassador to Switzerland
- Dov Yosef (BA 1921) – former member of the Israeli Parliament and Israel's Minister of Justice, Minister of Trade and Industry, and Minister of Health
- Peter Murcott Bunting (BEng 1983) – current Member of Parliament of Jamaica

===== Judges =====
- Akintola Olufemi Eyiwunmi (LLM 1964) – justice of the Supreme Court of Nigeria
- Muhammad Khalid Masud (MA 1971; PhD 1973) – current justice of the Shariat Appellate Bench of the Supreme Court of Pakistan
- Joni Madraiwiwi (LLM 1989; DipA&SL 1988) – Chief Justice of the Supreme Court of the Republic of Nauru
- Chile Eboe-Osuji (LLM 1991) – judge and currently president (chief justice) of the International Criminal Court

===== Heads of financial institutions =====
- Ernest Addison (PhD 1993) – banker, and current chairman and governor of the Central Bank of Ghana
- Kofi Wampah (MA 1983; PhD 1986) – former chairman and governor of the Bank of Ghana, and Chairman of the Central Bank Governors of West Africa
- DeLisle Worrell (MA 1973; PhD 1975) – former chairman and governor of the Central Bank of Barbados
- P. Amarasinghe (MA 1974) – deputy governor of the Central Bank of Sri Lanka

===== Ambassadors =====
- John L. Withers II (MA 1975) – ambassador of the United States to Albania
- Francis Terry McNamara (MA 1954) – ambassador of the United States to Gabon, Cape Verde, and São Tomé and Príncipe
- John Larkindale (PhD 1971) – ambassador of New Zealand to Russia and Australia
- Kurt Jaeger (LLM 1989) – current Ambassador of Liechtenstein to the United States
- Rıza Türmen (LLM 1980) – ambassador of Turkey to Switzerland
- Michael Žantovský (MA 1975) – ambassador of Czechoslovakia/Czech Republic to the United States, Israel, and the United Kingdom
- Jamaluddin Jarjis (PhD 1980) – ambassador of Malaysia to the United States
- Miguel Castilla (BA 1991) – ambassador of Peru to the United States
- John Rankin (LLM 1984) – ambassador of the United Kingdom to Sri Lanka, Nepal, and the Maldives

===== Others =====
- Joanne Liu (BSc 1987; MD 1991; IMHL 2014) – international president of Médecins Sans Frontières (Doctors Without Borders)
- Sam Nunberg (BA 2004) – former presidential political advisor to U.S. President Donald Trump
- Ilya Sheyman (BA 2006) – social activist and Democratic candidate for the U.S. House of Representatives in the 2012 election
- Morag Wise, Lady Wise (LLM 1994) – Scottish Senator of the College of Justice
- David Hackett (BA 1950) – boarding school friend of Robert F. Kennedy; founder and head of Lyndon B. Johnson's 1964 Volunteers in Service to America (VISTA), the domestic U.S. Peace Corps program; inspiration for Phineas in John Knowles's 1959 novel A Separate Peace; McGill hockey player and selected for the US Olympic Hockey Team (1952)
- Wang Bingzhang (Phd 1982) – Chinese Dissident and Political Prisoner, the founding father of the overseas Chinese Democratic Movement.

=== Art, music, and film ===
- Ayal Adler – musician and composer
- Will Aitken – novelist and film critic
- Patrick Allen – English actor and businessman, known for Shakespearean roles and for narrating the controversial Protect and Survive public information films for the British government
- Michael Andre – poet and editor
- Darcy James Argue – jazz composer and bandleader
- Burt Bacharach - American composer, songwriter, record producer and pianist
- Hadji Bakara – "sound manipulator" and secondary keyboardist for Wolf Parade
- Samantha Bee – correspondent, The Daily Show
- Yanic Bercier – drummer for death metal band Quo Vadis
- Mary E. Black – occupational therapist, teacher, master weaver and writer
- Claire Boucher – musician and visual artist under stage name Grimes
- Win Butler – musician, co-founder of Arcade Fire
- Peter Butterfield – concert tenor and conductor
- Anne Carson – poet and professor of classics
- Regine Chassagne – musician, co-founder of Arcade Fire
- John Austin Clark – music director and harpsichordist, co-founder of Bourbon Baroque
- Leonard Cohen – poet, author, songwriter, singer, Rock & Roll Hall of Fame inductee
- Sheldon Cohen – animator and illustrator of The Hockey Sweater
- Chuck Comeau – drummer and songwriter for band Simple Plan
- Hume Cronyn – actor, The Seventh Cross, Cocoon; studied theatre, left for Broadway without completing his degree
- Hubert Davis (BA 2000) – Oscar nominee for best documentary short subject
- Mackenzie Davis – actress and Canadian Screen Award nominee for The F Word
- Audrey Capel Doray – artist
- Christopher Downs – actor and entertainer in Taiwan and China, known there as 夏克立
- William Henry Drummond – Irish-born Canadian poet
- Louis Dudek – poet
- Arthur Erickson – architect (Robson Square, Vancouver; Canadian Chancery, Washington DC; Roy Thomson Hall; Museum of Anthropology, UBC; Simon Fraser University; Museum of Glass, Tacoma; California Plaza, San Diego Convention Center)
- Mary Fahl – singer and actress
- Colin Ferguson – actor, Eureka
- Karl Fischer – architect practicing in Montreal and New York City
- Jessalyn Gilsig – actress, Boston Public, NYPD Blue, Nip/Tuck, Glee
- Grace Glowicki – actress and filmmaker
- Evan Goldberg – co-writer of Superbad, Pineapple Express
- Jonathan Goldstein – author and radio producer, host of WireTap on CBC Radio One
- Estelí Gomez - Grammy winning musician, university instructor
- Chilly Gonzales – Grammy-nominated musician
- Linda Griffiths – playwright, actress
- Paul Haddad – actor
- Aaron Harris – percussionist/drummer, of Islands, Montreal-based indie rock group
- Sinjin Hawke – music producer and DJ
- Gavin Heffernan – director, Expiration
- Jennifer Irwin – actress, Still Standing
- Heather Juergensen – actress, co-screenwriter Kissing Jessica Stein
- Maxwell M. Kalman – architect, designed Canada's first mall Norgate shopping centre
- George Karpati
- Kid Koala, born Eric San – turntablist and musician
- Mia Kirshner – actress, The L Word
- Veronika Krausas – composer
- Christian Lander – author of the Stuff White People Like blog
- Robert Lantos – film producer
- Lily Laverock – journalist, impresario and suffragist
- Irving Layton – poet
- Stephen Leacock – humorist and economist
- Rachelle Lefevre – actress, Big Wolf on Campus, Twilight
- Norman Levine (BA, MA) – writer
- Daniel Levitin – writer, This Is Your Brain On Music; musician
- Julia Loktev – director of The Loneliest Planet, Day Night Day Night
- Brian Macdonald – choreographer and dancer in Canada, New York, and Europe
- Hugh MacLennan – writer, Two Solitudes, Barometer Rising
- Miles Mander – early film actor, director and novelist
- Louise Manny – historian and folklorist, collected New Brunswick folksongs
- Ruth Marshall – actress who played in Flashpoint as the SRU's forensic psychologist
- Cameron Mathison – actor, All My Children
- Marc Mayer – art curator and director of the National Gallery of Canada
- Harry Mayerovitch – artist
- John McCrae – surgeon, poet, author of Canadian poem "In Flanders' Fields"
- Kate McGarrigle – musician and folk-singer
- Dorothy McIlwraith – editor of Weird Tales, 1940–54
- Casey McKinnon – actress
- Sophia Michahelles – pageant puppet designer and co-artistic director, Processional Arts Workshop
- Raymond Moriyama – architect (Bata Shoe Museum, Toronto; Canadian Embassy, Tokyo; Ontario Science Centre; Toronto Reference Library; Canadian War Museum; Saudi Arabian National Museum, Riyadh)
- Suniti Namjoshi – writer
- Heather O'Neill – writer
- Alisa Palmer – playwright and theatre director
- Donald Patriquin – composer and organist
- Mauro Pezzente – bassist and co-founder of Godspeed You! Black Emperor
- Sam Roberts – musician
- John Rogers – writer/producer, Leverage
- Rebecca Rosenblum – writer, winner of the 2007 Metcalf-Rooke Award
- Dean Rosenthal – composer
- Moshe Safdie – architect (National Gallery of Canada, Vancouver Library, Salt Lake City Public Library, Musee de la Civilisation, Habitat '67)
- Robert Edison Sandiford – short story writer and essayist
- John Ralston Saul – Governor General's Award-winning philosophical author
- Robert William Service – poet and writer of the Yukon Gold Rush
- Mark Shainblum – author and comic book creator
- William Shatner – actor, Boston Legal; Captain James T. Kirk in Star Trek
- Jaspreet Singh – author, Seventeen Tomatoes
- Sonja Skarstedt – poet and illustrator
- Nigel Spencer – literary translator.Governor General's Literary Awards--2002, 2007, 2012
- Donald Steven – Juno Award and Jules Léger Prize winning composer
- Philippe Tatartcheff – Swiss-born poet and songwriter notable for writing songs in French with 8
- Anna and Kate McGarrigle
- Ruth Taylor – poet
- Gentile Tondino – artist
- J. Torres – comic book writer
- Zineb Triki – actress
- Jessica Trisko – 2007 Miss Earth titleholder
- Louis Vaczek – novelist, science writer, editor, and teacher
- Ken Vandermark – jazz saxophonist and MacArthur Foundation "genius award" winner
- Aquil Virani - artist
- Benjamin Von Wong - artist, activist, and photographer
- Rufus Wainwright (briefly attended – dropped out upon record deal) – recording artist, musician
- Daniel Waters (screenwriter) – writer of Heathers, Batman Returns
- William Weintraub – author, journalist and filmmaker (Why Rock the Boat?)
- Robert Stanley Weir – author (in 1908) of the English words to "O, Canada"
- Matthew White – countertenor
- Jan Wong – Globe and Mail columnist ("Lunch with Jan Wong" series); author of books including award-winning Red China Blues and Jan Wong's China
- Royal Wood – singer-songwriter
- Amanda Yiyen – Taiwanese pianist

=== Architects ===
For a full list of notable alumni and faculty from the School of Architecture, see:

=== Inventors ===
- Bernard Belleau – inventor of lamivudine, a drug used in the treatment of HIV and Hepatitis B infection
- Willard Boyle – inventor of the charge-coupled device
- Thomas Chang – creator of the first artificial cell
- James Creighton (Law 1880) – considered the originator of North American ice hockey rules
- Charles R. Drew (MDCM 1933) – black American medical pioneer; track star who led McGill to five intercollegiate titles; as medical advisor for the Blood for Britain program of World War II, the father of blood banks
- Marcellus Gilmore Edson (unknown, Faculty of Chemistry) – first patent-holder in North America for the invention of peanut butter
- Lorne Elias (PhD 1956) – inventor of the explosives vapour detector EVD-1
- Alan Emtage – inventor of Archie, the grandfather of search engines
- Colonel Dr. Cluny MacPherson (MD 1901) – inventor of the MacPherson respirator gas mask during World War I
- Paul Moller – inventor of the Moller Skycar, a VTOL aircraft

=== Sports ===
- Betty Archdale – former captain (1934/5) of English women's cricket team
- Mike Babcock – NHL coach, formerly of the Toronto Maple Leafs; first and as of 2016 only coach to be a member of the Triple Gold Club, having won the Stanley Cup (Detroit, 2008), Olympic gold medal for men's ice hockey (2010, 2014), and the International Ice Hockey Federation (IIHF) Ice Hockey World Championship
- Russ Blinco – Montreal Maroons centre; 1935 NHL Rookie of the Year
- Guy Boucher – former head coach of the Ottawa Senators
- George Burnett – former head coach for the Edmonton Oilers
- Doug Carpenter – former head coach for the Toronto Maple Leafs and New Jersey Devils
- Randy Chevrier – former NFL and CFL player
- J. P. Darche – American football long snapper
- Ken Dryden (LLB 1974) – politician, lawyer, businessman, author; retired National Hockey League goaltender from the Montreal Canadiens; former president of the Toronto Maple Leafs
- Laurent Duvernay-Tardif (MD, CM 2018) – American football player for the Kansas City Chiefs, graduated from McGill's Medical School in 2018; first medical doctor and first Quebecer to play and win the Super Bowl.
- Phil Edwards (MD 1936) – one of Canada's most decorated Olympians with 5 bronze medals
- Jack Gelineau – Boston Bruins and Chicago Blackhawks goaltender who won Calder Trophy as NHL Rookie of the Year in 1950
- Jennifer Heil (BComm) – 2006 Olympic gold medalist in freestyle skiing
- George Hodgson (BEng 1916) – Canadian Olympic men's swim team (1912 and 1920); McGill's first athlete to win an Olympic gold medal; first Canadian to win two Olympic gold medals (Stockholm, 1916)
- Jackrabbit Johannsen – Norwegian-Canadian; credited with introducing cross-country skiing to North America; lived in retirement at McGill's Mont-Saint-Hilaire Gault Nature Reserve
- Charline Labonté (BEd – Physical Education) – 2006 Olympic gold medalist in women's ice hockey
- R. Tait McKenzie – pioneer in college physical education; sculptor; physician
- Percival Molson – college athlete and soldier in World War I; namesake of Percival Molson Memorial Stadium
- James Naismith (BA 1887) – inventor of basketball; University of Kansas coach; namesake of six NCAA college basketball awards and the Naismith Memorial Basketball Hall of Fame
- Kevin O'Neill – former head coach of the Toronto Raptors; former head coach for USC Trojans men's basketball.
- Frank Patrick (BA 1908) – wrote much of the NHL rule book
- Hon. Sydney David Pierce (BA 1922, BCL 1925, LLD 1956) – 1924 Olympic swimmer and former Canadian ambassador to many countries
- Dick Pound – former Olympic swimmer, former IOC vice president, chancellor of McGill, current chairman of the World Anti-Doping Agency (WADA)
- Silver Quilty – Canadian Football Hall of Fame inductee, Canada's Sports Hall of Fame inductee, Canadian Amateur Hockey Association president.
- Allan Roth – baseball and hockey statistician for the Brooklyn/Los Angeles Dodgers of Major League Baseball (1947-1964) and the Montreal Canadiens of the National Hockey League (1944-1947). Canadian Baseball Hall of Fame inductee.
- Samantha Rapoport – NFL Director of Player Development, former Canada women's national football team and Montreal Blitz quarterback
- Kim St-Pierre (BEd 2005) – Canadian Olympic women's hockey team (2002 and 2006), McGill's first female athlete to become an Olympic gold medallist (Salt Lake City, 2002)
- Frank "Shag" Shaughnessy – first professional football coach hired by a Canadian university, he revolutionized Canadian college football by introducing the forward pass in 1921 in a game against Syracuse University and lobbied for a decade until the forward pass was adopted by the Canadian Rugby Football Union in 1931
- Howard Stupp (born 1955) - Olympic wrestler
- Jack Wright (MDCM 1928) – 11-year veteran of Canadian Davis Cup team in the 1920s and 1930s
- David Zilberman – Canadian Olympic heavyweight wrestler

=== Fictional characters ===
- Major Donald Craig, Canadian commando serving with British special forces during World War II, portrayed by Rock Hudson in the 1967 war movie Tobruk. Though the film was loosely based on real events, it's not clear whether or not Hudson's character was based on a real person. Most likely he was a pastiche character, given a Canadian background as cover for Hudson's inability to emulate a British accent.
- David Hollander, played by Dylan Walsh, former McGill University hockey player and father to Shane Hollander in the Crave Canadian sports romance television series Heated Rivalry
- Dr. Walter Langkowski, researcher from the Marvel Comics Canadian superhero series Alpha Flight; portrayed as a McGill-based biophysicist researching the gamma radiation accident which created the Hulk; his discoveries transformed him into the superhero known as Sasquatch
- Lieutenant Alan McGregor, played by Gary Cooper, Lives of a Bengal Lancer (1935)
- Dr. Robert Richardson, played by Lew Ayres, Johnny Belinda (1948)
- Dr. James Wilson, oncologist and best friend to main character Gregory House in the Fox Network TV drama House

=== Others ===
- Monroe Abbey – Canadian lawyer and Jewish civic leader
- Amal Elsana Alh'jooj – Bedouin Israeli feminist and peace activist
- Norman Bethune – as "Bai Qiu'en", subject of essay In Memory of Norman Bethune (in Quotations from Chairman Mao Tse-tung, Chapter 17: Serving the People) (Jinian Bai Qiu'en) by Mao Zedong; medical professor; became Red Army's medical chief and trained thousands of Chinese as medics and doctors; died in 1939 (from blood poisoning) during the Second Sino-Japanese War
- Frank E. Buck – horticulturalist
- Ian Campbell, 12th Duke of Argyll – Scottish peer and landowner
- Dink Carroll – sports journalist
- Choo Waihong – Singaporean corporate lawyer and travel writer
- Chi-Ming Chow – cardiologist and board member of the Heart and Stroke Foundation
- Dmytro Cipywnyk – physician and academic
- Caroline Codsi: President and founder of Women in Governance and board member of Montreal Museum of Fine Arts
- Lawrence Moore Cosgrave – Canadian signer of the Japanese Instrument of Surrender
- Thomas Neill Cream – Glasgow-born serial killer of the 1800s, thought by some to have been Jack the Ripper
- Alanna Devine – founder of McGill Student Animal Legal Defence Fund and director of Animal Advocacy
- Victor Dzau (MD) – president of the Institute of Medicine of the National Academy of Sciences
- Rocco Galati – constitutional lawyer; challenged Justice Marc Nadon's appointment to the Supreme Court of Canada
- Charles Goren – world champion bridge player and bestselling author
- Bertha Hosang Mah, first Chinese woman to graduate from a Canadian university (McGill 1917)
- John Harrison, lawyer and general counsel of Airbus
- John Peters Humphrey – author of the first draft of the UN Universal Declaration of Human Rights
- Arnold Johnson – performed the first cardiac heart catheterization procedure in Canada in 1946
- Annie MacDonald Langstaff – in 1914 became McGill's and Quebec's first female law graduate but was not admitted to the Quebec bar until 2006 (posthumously); the Quebec bar did not admit women until 1941
- Neville Maxwell – British journalist; author of notable book on the Sino-Indian War
- Colin McGregor (BA, 1984) - infamous crossbow murderer in 1991
- Nancy Morris – first female rabbi in Scotland
- William Reginald Morse, Canadian author, medical doctor, and medical missionary in China
- Natasha Negovanlis – actress; singer; writer; host; LGBTQIA icon
- Madeleine Parent, Canadian labour, feminist and aboriginal rights activist
- Autumn Phillips – ex-wife of Peter Phillips, who is 18th in line for the British throne
- André Robert – father of the Canadian numerical weather prediction models
- Francis Scrimger (BA, 1901; MDCM 1905) – Victoria Cross winner, 1915; Professor of Surgery and Chief of Surgery at the Children's Memorial Hospital
- Harmeet Singh Sooden – peace activist once held captive in Iraq
- Robert Thirsk – astronaut
- Dafydd Williams – astronaut
- Janet Yale – Canadian lawyer
- Mark Rosenbloom – doctor and entrepreneur
