= Order of Montreal =

Canadian municipal order

Order of Montreal Ordre de Montréal

Awarded by Mayor of Montreal
- Type: Municipal order
- Established: 17 May 2016
- Status: Currently constituted
- Mayor: Soraya Martinez Ferrada
- Grades: Commander (commandeur/commandeure) (COM); Officer (officier/officières) (OOM); Knight (chevalier/chevalière) (ChOM)
- Post-nominals: C.O.M.; O.O.M.; Ch.O.M.
- Website: ville.montreal.qc.ca/ordre/

Statistics
- First induction: December 2016
- Total inductees: 196

The Order of Montreal (Ordre de Montréal) is a municipal order awarded to residents of the city of Montreal, in the province of Quebec, Canada, since 2016.

The honour succeeds the former Great Montrealer, which was conferred from 1988 to 2015 by the Academy of Great Montrealers.

== History ==
As a legacy of Montréal's 375th anniversary, Ville de Montréal created an honorary order to recognize the talents and achievements of the men and women who have helped shape the city. The new honour was announced in December 2015 and on 17 May 2016 mayor Denis Coderre presented the inaugural honours. It was decided that they would be awarded on 17 May each year, which is the anniversary of the founding of Montreal.

The Order of Montreal succeeded the Academy of Great Montrealers, a special honour that was created in 1988 by the Board of Trade of Metropolitan Montreal and terminated in 2015. All recipients of that honour were awarded the Order of Montreal in December 2016 with the rank of Commander.

== Description ==
As a municipal order, it is not directly ranked in the Canadian honours system.

The Order, like the Order of Canada and National Order of Quebec, has three ranks consisting of (in descending order) commander, officer, and knight. Each year, three commanders, six officers, and eight knights are invested.

The Order of Montreal recognizes 17 prominent personalities each year, following a public call for nominations. Recipients of the honour have distinguished themselves in one or more of the following ways, regardless of their area of activity:

- Decisive contribution to the development of Montreal
- Notable contribution to the national or international reputation of Montreal
- Exemplary commitment to the community
- Exceptional professional achievements

Applications are accepted until 31 October each year for the Order of Montreal for the following year. Nominations must be supported by two persons.

=== Eligibility ===
Regardless of age, status or field of activity, persons nominated for admission to the Order must meet at least one of the following criteria:

- Be born on the territory of the Montreal urban agglomeration
- Reside or have resided within this same territory for at least 5 years
- Carry out or have carried out professional activities within this same territory for at least 5 years

=== Medal ===
The medal of the Order of Montreal incorporates the City's official symbols, that is, the flag of Montreal and its coat of arms.

== Order of Montreal council ==
Chosen for their credibility, the members of the council of the Order of Montreal thoroughly review each application to ensure the prestige of the institution. The council plays an advisory role. Its main mandate is to review the files submitted following the annual call for nominations and to make recommendations for admission to the Order.

This role includes the assigning of a rank – commander, officer or knight – for each selected nominee, based on the scope of their achievements. Council members will take into consideration the scope, originality and impact of the achievements on community life, as well as any specific factor deemed relevant. The council may also make suggestions regarding the management of the Ordre and all matters intended to safeguard the prestige and reputation of the Ordre.

Medal recipients are named by the City's executive committee, upon the recommendation of the mayor.

== Ceremony ==
Recipients are presented with their insignia at an official ceremony at city hall. The event is held each year normally on May 17, the date of the founding of Montreal.

The presentation of the insignia is accompanied by a certificate bearing the seal of the Ordre. Recipients' names are then written in calligraphy in the Ordre's "Golden Book".

Each recipient is entitled to one page on the website, detailing his or her contributions and achievements.

Large-format photos of each recipient are also displayed at Montreal City Hall along the route taken by guided tours.

== Notable recipients ==
Since its inception in 2016, the following notable individuals have received the Order:

- 2016: Denys Arcand
- 2016: Frédéric Back
- 2016: Laurent Beaudoin
- 2016: Michel Bélanger
- 2016: Jean Béliveau
- 2016: Francesco Bellini
- 2016: Aldo Bensadoun
- 2016: André Bérard
- 2016: Lise Bissonnette
- 2016: Yvette Brind'Amour
- 2016: Charles Bronfman
- 2016: Georges Brossard
- 2016: Alexander Brott
- 2016: Denis Brott
- 2016: André Caillé
- 2016: Gilles Carle
- 2016: Thérèse Casgrain (Posthumous award)
- 2016: Claude Castonguay
- 2016: André Chagnon
- 2016: Gretta Chambers
- 2016: Robert Charlebois
- 2016: Ludmilla Chiriaeff
- 2016: Marcel Côté
- 2016: Arlette Cousture
- 2016: Jean Coutu
- 2016: David Culver
- 2016: Camille A Dagenais
- 2016: Pierre Dansereau
- 2016: Charles Daudelin
- 2016: Paul David
- 2016: A. Jean de Grandpré
- 2016: Yvon Deschamps
- 2016: Hélène Desmarais
- 2016: Paul Desmarais
- 2016: Paul Desmarais Jr
- 2016: Jean Drapeau
- 2016: Jean Duceppe
- 2016: Joseph Honoré Gérald Fauteux
- 2016: William Feindel
- 2016: Denise Filiatrault
- 2016: Armand Frappier
- 2016: Roger Gaudry
- 2016: Daniel Gauthier
- 2016: Gratien Gélinas
- 2016: Jacques Genest
- 2016: Paul Gérin-Lajoie
- 2016: Phil Gold
- 2016: Alan B. Gold
- 2016: Jeannine Guindon
- 2016: Pavel Hamet
- 2016: Michal Hornstein
- 2016: Emmett Johns
- 2016: Oliver Jones
- 2016: Maryvonne Kendergi
- 2016: Maurice L'Abbé
- 2016: Andrée Lachapelle
- 2016: Robert Lacroix
- 2016: Guy Laliberté
- 2016: Bernard Lamarre
- 2016: Jacques Lamarre
- 2016: Phyllis Lambert
- 2016: André Langevin
- 2016: Daniel Langlois
- 2016: Paul-Émile Léger
- 2016: Margaret Lock
- 2016: Antonine Maillet
- 2016: Rémi Marcoux
- 2016: L. Jacques Ménard
- 2016: Dominique Michel
- 2016: Albert Millaire
- 2016: Brenda Milner
- 2016: Henry Mintzberg
- 2016: Claude Montmarquette
- 2016: Jean C. Monty
- 2016: Balfour M. Mount
- 2016: Heather Munroe-Blum
- 2016: Kent Nagano
- 2016: Huguette Oligny
- 2016: J. Alphonse Ouimet
- 2016: Julie Payette
- 2016: Alfred Pellan
- 2016: Pierre Péladeau
- 2016: Sam Pollock
- 2016: Hubert Reeves
- 2016: Maurice Richard
- 2016: Denise Robert
- 2016: Emanuele Lino Saputo
- 2016: Jeanne Sauvé
- 2016: Charles R. Scriver
- 2016: Alain Simard
- 2016: Paul Tellier
- 2016: Michèle Thibodeau Deguire
- 2016: Michel Tremblay
- 2016: Pierre Elliott Trudeau
- 2016: Charles Taylor
- 2016: Lise Watier
- 2017: Manon Barbeau
- 2017: Jean Davignon
- 2017: Michelle Dawson
- 2017: Jacqueline Desmarais
- 2017: Dany Laferrière
- 2017: Yannick Nézet-Séguin
- 2017: Alanis Obomsawin
- 2017: Françoise Sullivan
- 2017: Ashok Vijh
- 2018: Joséphine Bacon
- 2018: Marisa Ferretti Barth
- 2018: Anik Bissonnette
- 2018: Nathalie Bondil
- 2018: Michel Chrétien
- 2018: Angèle Dubeau
- 2018: Ratna Ghosh
- 2018: Michel Lemieux
- 2018: Victor Pilon
- 2018: Richard Pound
- 2018: Louise Roy
- 2018: Louis Vachon
- 2019: Jean Beaudin
- 2019: Sylvie Bernier
- 2019: Gina P. Cody
- 2019: Paul-André Fortier
- 2019: Madeleine Juneau
- 2019: René Richard Cyr
- 2019: Joseph Rouleau
- 2020: Françoise Bertrand
- 2020: Walter Boudreau
- 2020: Guy Breton
- 2020: Pierre Bruneau
- 2020: Michel Goulet
- 2020: Guy Latraverse
- 2020: Donna Mergler
- 2020: Lorraine Pintal
- 2022: Aurèle Cardinal
- 2022: Claude Corbo
- 2022: Gérald Larose
- 2022: Monique Mujawamariya
- 2023: Farah Alibay
- 2023: Louise Arbour
- 2023: Claude Gagnon
- 2023: Danièle Sauvageau
- 2023: Kim Yaroshevskaya
- 2024: Louise Bessette
- 2024: Luc Provost
- 2024: Gabor Szilasi

== See also ==
- Order of Hamilton
- Order of Ottawa
