= Aldo (brand) =

Canadian shoe retailer

Aldo Group

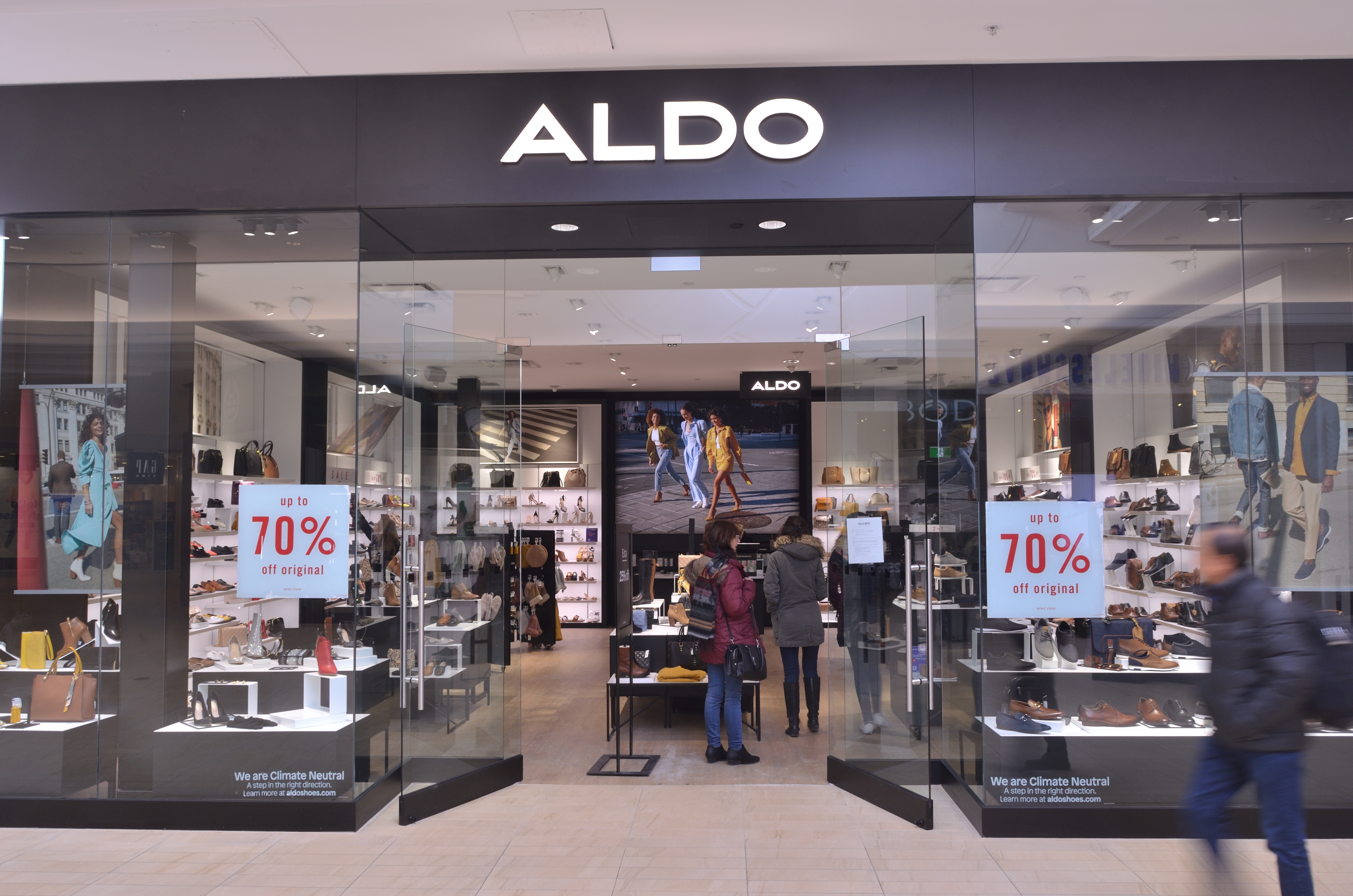
- Store in Richmond Hill, ON
- Type: Privately held company
- Industry: Retail
- Founded: 1972; 54 years ago
- Founder: Aldo Bensadoun
- Headquarters: 905, rue Hodge; Montreal, Quebec; H4N 2B3
- Area served: Worldwide
- Key people: David Bensadoun, CEO; Norman Jaskolka, deputy chair
- Products: Shoes & accessories
- Divisions: Aldo; Call It Spring; Globo; Sperry
- Website: Official website

The Aldo Group, branded and stylized as ALDO, is a Canadian multinational retailer specializing in shoes and accessories. Aldo was founded by Aldo Bensadoun in 1972 in Montreal, Quebec. Its corporate headquarters are in Saint-Laurent, Quebec. Stores in Canada and the U.S. are owned by Aldo Group, while international stores are franchised.

== History ==
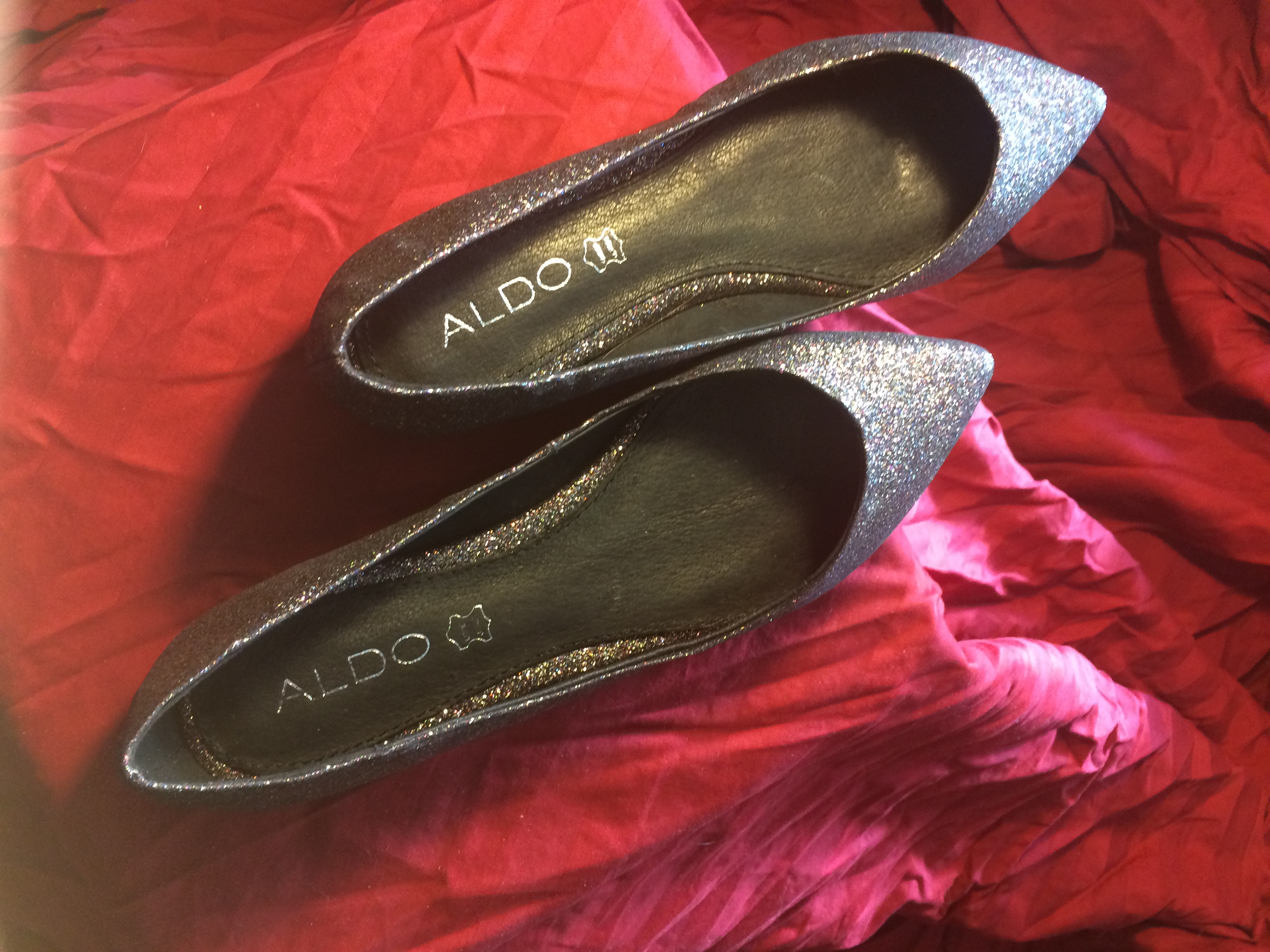
Aldo silver ballet pumps

Aldo shoes were founded in Canada in 1972 as a footwear concession within Le Château. The original group included stores in Montreal, Ottawa, Quebec City, and Winnipeg. Aldo Bensadoun known today as a global shoe giant built his empire starting in Montreal. After four generations, the Bensadoun family continues into the shoe industry. "Bensadoun never intended to follow in the footsteps of his father, a shoe retailer in Morocco and France, or his grandfather, a cobbler in Algeria" (Strauss, 2010). Bensadoun learned Italian to better communicate with his suppliers in Italy, and eventually cut out the middleman who serviced him between Canada and European manufacturers (Strauss, 2010). The first freestanding Aldo store was opened in Montreal, in 1978. The brand expanded in the 1980s and 1990s, with stores operating under the name Aldo across Canada. The first store outside of North America opened in Israel in 1995. The brand expanded in the 2000s into Saudi Arabia in 2001, England in 2002, and Singapore in 2003. Since then, the Aldo Group, with the Aldo and Spring banners, has further expanded internationally.

In 1991, the company launched the "Transit" banner in Canada, which later became "Spring" upon launching in the US. Five years later, they started the "Feetfirst" banner, which caters to an older clientele. Additionally the company operates "Globo Shoes" geared towards the family market. In 2010, the company once again began to evolve when it introduced, in Canada, a new store concept called "Lōcale", which will replace the current "Feetfirst" stores. "Lōcale" is a footwear and accessories boutique-style concept store aimed at young professionals; it offers a number of brand names. The company has also revived the Pegabo brand, which used to be its own chain of stores and is selling the brand in Feetfirst and Lōcale stores. In spring 2011, the Pegabo brand also launched at Hudson's Bay stores in Canada.

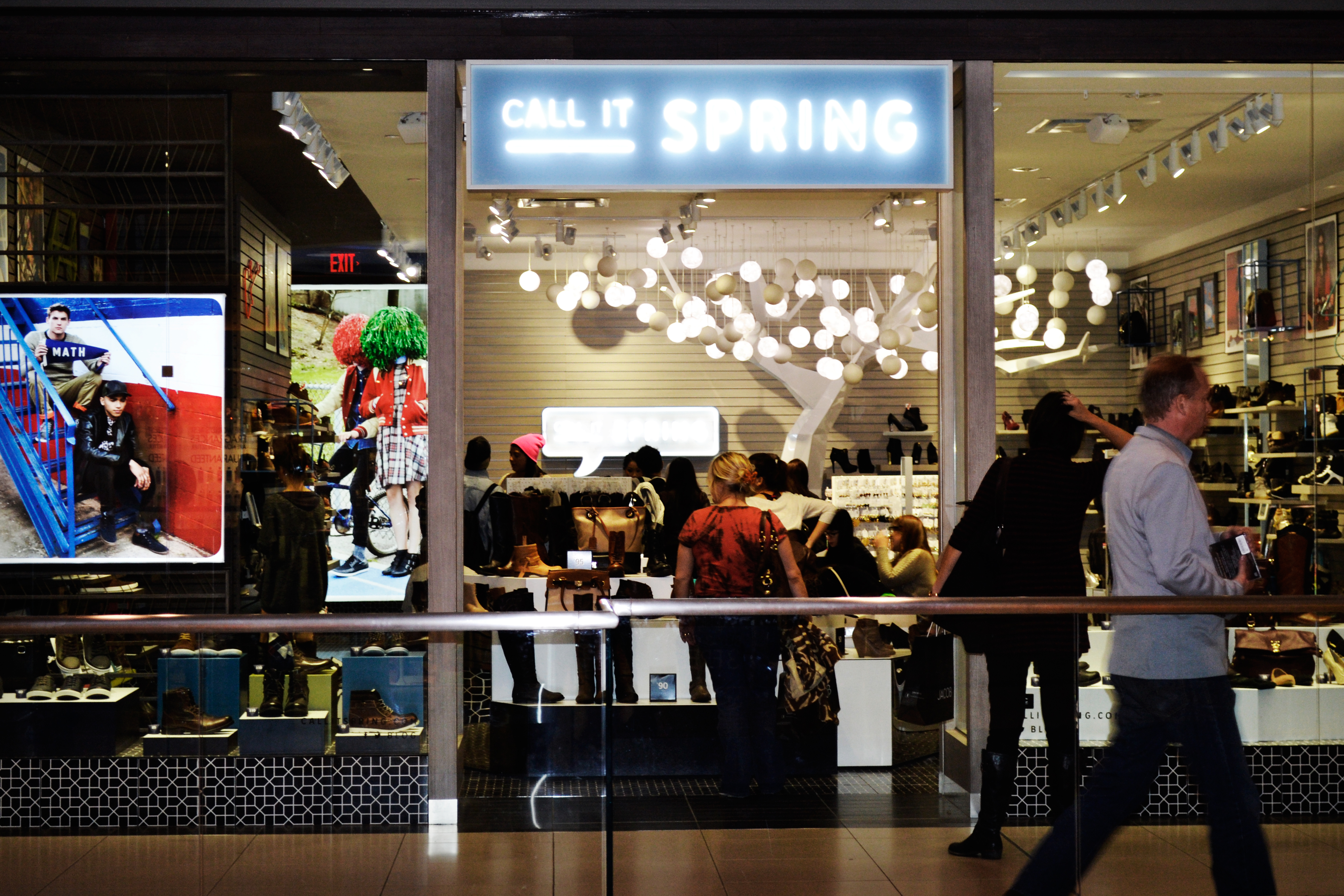
Call It Spring location in Toronto's Eaton Centre

In 2010, the company made major announcements, which led to major expansion in the American market. The Aldo Group and JCPenney announced the launch of the Call It Spring brand, which would sell as a shop-in-shop concept in JCPenney stores across the United States. The Call It Spring concept was expected to be in 600 JCPenney stores by the fall of 2011 and JCPenney would be the only department store retailer of the brand. The Aldo Group also announced that it was partnering with Kohl's department stores to design and produce exclusive footwear products that would be sold under private and exclusive brand names. The new Aldo-designed products were to launch in Kohl's stores for the Spring 2011 season.

In 2017, Bensadoun's son David Bensadoun was appointed chief executive of Aldo, replacing Patrik Frisk.

In May 2020, Aldo announced it would restructure under the Companies’ Creditors Arrangement Act citing the impact of the COVID-19 pandemic in Canada. All 6,680 store associates and more than half of the employees at its headquarters have been furloughed. In the midst of its restructuration, the company also move from its mythic headquarters to a nearby location in Saint-Laurent, Montreal. In July 2022, it announced that it had completed its restructuring process.

The company once operated the now closed or rebranded banners Little Burgundy (which it sold to Genesco), Simard & Voyer, Christian Shoes, Access, Pegabo, Transit, Stoneridge, Locale, Feetfirst and FIRST (which was the American version of Feetfirst).

In January 2024, Authentic Brands Group licensed its Sperry brand to the Aldo Group for North American operations. Aldo already works closely with Authentic on brands like Brooks Brothers and Roxy.

== Controversy ==
In December 2012, the U.S. Department of Labor found that a factory in Los Angeles producing Aldo goods was paying employees under minimum wage.
