= Prix Félix-Leclerc =

Prix Félix-Leclerc may refer to:

- Félix Award, the annual music awards presented by ADISQ to musicians from Quebec
- Prix Félix-Leclerc de la chanson, the annual music award presented by the Les Francos de Montréal festival
- Prix Félix-Leclerc de la poésie, an annual literary award presented by the Festival international de la poésie de Trois-Rivières
