= Avenir d'enfants =

Avenir d'enfants (French for "the future of children") is a Quebecer non-profit organization, based in Montreal, which supports local communities engaged in the overall development of children aged five and under living in poverty.

Avenir d'enfants is a partnership between the Government of Quebec Minister of Families and the Lucie and André Chagnon Foundation, and was created on September 30, 2009, to establish an early childhood development fund.

According to the Bulletin national d'information Investir pour l'avenir, vol. 3, n° 1, winter 2011, in 2010, Avenir d'enfants supported 41 communities, in which 83,000 young children live, spread over 10 administrative regions of Quebec, thus enabling 779 partners to mobilize around 45 projects.
