= Alain Simard =

Alain Simard may refer to:

- Alain Simard (businessman), Québécois businessman of production company Équipe Spectra
- Alain Simard (director), Québécois television director, musician, singer, and songwriter who remade the theme song for La Job
