= Joseph Kruger II =

Canadian billionaire businessman

- Born: July 12, 1945 (age 81); Montreal
- Education: Clarkson University
- Occupation: CEO of Kruger
- Children: 2
- Website: Kruger

Joseph Kruger II, born in Montreal on July 12, 1945, is a Canadian businessman. He leads and develops the Kruger Group, his Quebec-based family business active in the paper, packaging, and energy sectors.

Kruger II earned a bachelor's degree in mechanical engineering from Clarkson University in New York in 1967. He became chairman of the board and CEO of the Kruger in 1988.

The son of Gene Kruger and grandson of founder Joseph Kruger, Kruger II played a central role in modernizing and diversifying the company. He integrated new technologies in his manufacturing facilities and expanded production activities in Canada and internationally. The Kruger Group is one of the leading private companies in Canada's paper industry today.

== Distinctions ==
- 1987 — Honorary Doctorate from Clarkson University
- 1994 — Knight of the National Order of Quebec
- 1996 — Honorary Doctorate from Memorial University of Newfoundland
- 1998 — Member of the Order of Canada
- 1998 — Honorary Doctorate from the University of Sherbrooke
- 2002 — Honorary Doctorate from the University of Quebec at Trois-Rivières
- 2005 — Honorary Doctorate from Laval University
- 2016 — Medal of Honour from the National Assembly of Quebec
- 2020 — Commander of the Order of Montreal

== Personal life ==
Kruger II has two children, Sarah and Gene, who serve on the board of directors of the family business. In 2025, his fortune is estimated at 1.9 billion Canadian dollars.
