= Guindon =

Guindon or Guindón may refer to:

== People with the surname ==
- Bernie Guindon (born 1942), Canadian outlaw biker and criminal
- Bob Guindon (born 1950), Canadian ice hockey player
- Bobby Guindon (born 1943), American baseball player
- Claudio Guindón (born 1963), Argentine Olympic rower
- Dick Guindon (1935-2022), American cartoonist
- Fernand Guindon (1917–1985), Canadian politician in Ontario
- Jeannine Guindon (1919–2002), Canadian psychology professor
- Léo Guindon (1908–1977), Canadian trade union organizer
- Luc Guindon (born 1943), Canadian politician in Ontario
- Roger Guindon (1920–2012), Canadian priest

== Other uses ==
- Guindon v Canada, a 2015 decision by the Supreme Court of Canada
- Lake Guindon, a lake in Quebec, Canada
