= Aldo Bensadoun =

Canadian-Moroccan businessman and philanthropist

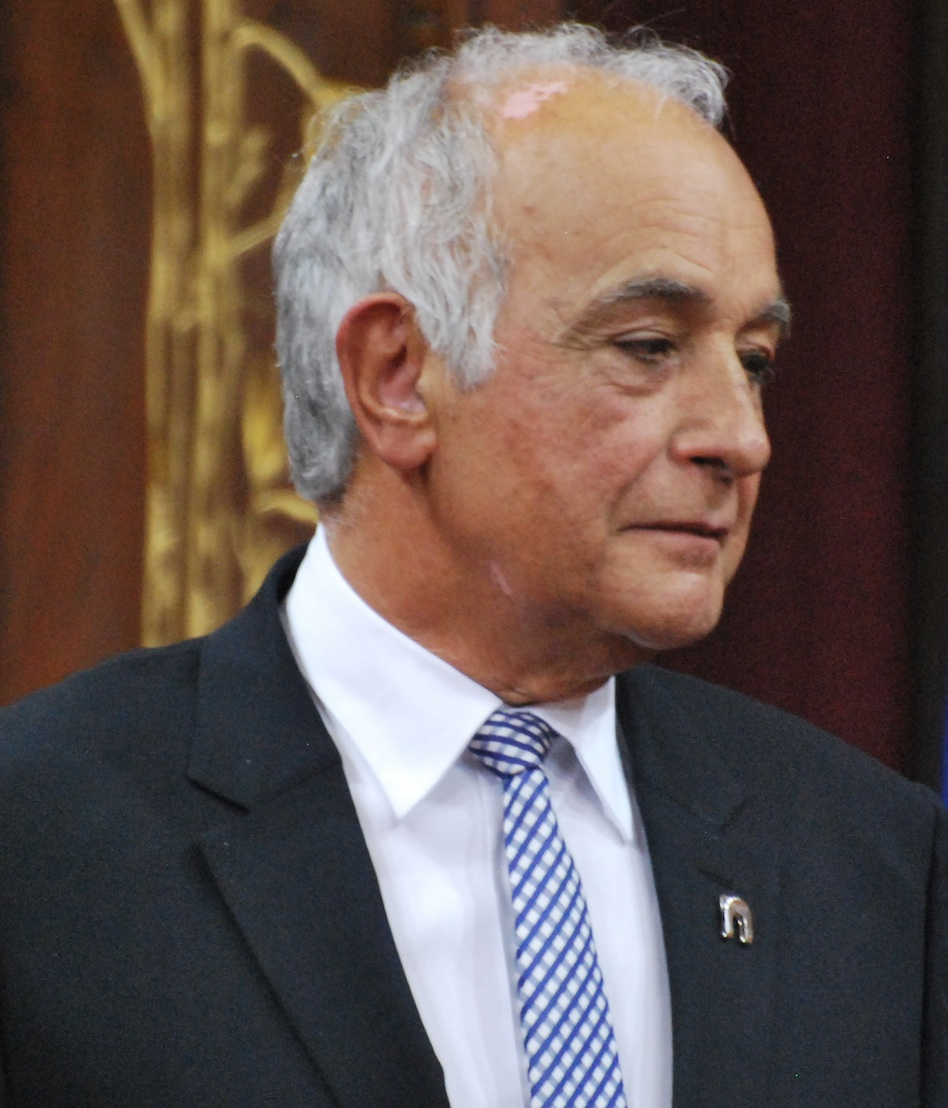
- Born: Albert Bensadoun; 1939 (age 86–87); Fez, Morocco
- Education: McGill University
- Known for: Founder of Aldo
- Spouse: Dianne Bibeau
- Children: 3

Albert "Aldo" Bensadoun (born 1939), is a Moroccan-Canadian businessman. He is the founder and executive chairman of Aldo, a retail shoe company based in Montreal, Quebec, Canada. Bensadoun's family foundation donated $25 million to McGill University to help found the Bensadoun School of Retail Management.

== Early life ==
Aldo Bensadoun (Hebrew: אלדו בן סעדון) was born in Fez to a Moroccan Jewish family; his father was a shoe retailer in Fez, Morocco and France. Bensadoun moved to the United States for his post-secondary education. He attended Cornell University before relocating to Montreal and graduating from McGill University with a commerce degree in 1964.

== Career ==
He worked at Yellow Shoes before founding the precursor to the Aldo Group in 1972 as a stand within the Le Château store in Montreal.

As of July 2020, Forbes estimated his net worth at US$1.1 billion.

== Honours ==
Bensadoun is a recipient of the Order of Canada. He is a recipient of the National Order of Quebec, and the Ordre de Montréal.

== Personal life ==
Bensadoun has been married twice. His first wife was a Scottish Protestant; they had two sons: David (born 1970) and Douglas (born 1973). His second wife is Dianne Bibeau; they have a daughter, Daniela (born 1991). His son David is the CEO of the Aldo Group and is married to Isabelle Poirier. Bensadoun lives in Montreal.

In 2012, his son, David, along with Patrick Beaule were the first Canadian four wheel team to complete the Dakar Rally.
