= Francesco Bellini =

Canadian businessman and scientist (1947–2025)

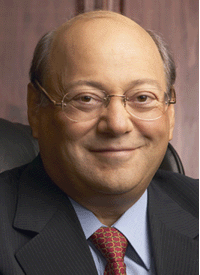
- Born: 20 November 1947; Ascoli Piceno, Italy
- Died: 10 July 2025 (aged 77); Calgary, Alberta, Canada
- Education: Loyola College; University of New Brunswick
- Title: Chairman, BELLUS Health Inc.
- Awards: Several awards received from 1987 to 2016
- Scientific career
- Fields: Research scientist administrator

Francesco Bellini, OC OQ (Italian: [franˈtʃesko belˈliːni]; 20 November 1947 – 10 July 2025) was an Italian-born Canadian research scientist, administrator and businessman.

A pioneer scientist-entrepreneur for the Canadian bio-pharmaceutical industry, he was co-founder of Biochem Pharma, as well as chairman and chief executive officer from 1986 to 2001. He authored or co-authored more than twenty-five patents over his 20-year career as a research scientist.

== Background ==
Born on 20 November 1947 in Ascoli Piceno, Italy, Bellini immigrated to Canada in 1967. He received his Bachelor of Science degree from Loyola College (now Concordia University) in 1972 and his Doctor of Philosophy specializing in organic chemistry from the University of New Brunswick in 1977. He was the author and co-author of some 30 patents and published numerous articles and papers based on his research.

Bellini died on 10 July 2025, at the age of 77.

== Sport ==
On 3 February 2014, Bellini refounded Ascoli Picchio F.C. 1898, and three days later the new club acquired all the rights of the bankrupted Ascoli Calcio 1898, the historical football team of Bellini's hometown.

== Philanthropy ==
Bellini donated $10 million towards a new life sciences building at McGill University. He made a major donation toward a new residence and centre for people with Alzheimer's in Laval.

== Special honours ==
For his major contribution in the fields of entrepreneurship, research and economy, Bellini received the title of "Cavaliere del Lavoro".

On 1 February 2016, he received a PhD honoris causa in Pharmaceutical Science from "La Sapienza University" of Rome.

== Awards ==
- 1987 – Successors: Second Annual Celebration of Canada's Unsung Business Heroes Canadian Business Magazine
- 1991 – Man of the Month Revue Commerce (Commerce Magazine)
- 1992 – Premio Award (Business Category) Canadian Italian Business and Professional Association
- 1993 – Ernest A. Le Sueur Memorial Lecturer Award Society of Chemical Industry of Canada
- 1994 – Prix Industrie 1994 « Association de la recherché industrielle du Québec » (Industrial Research Association of Quebec)
- 1995 – Personality of the Year Canadian Italian Business and Professional Association
- 1995 – The Golden Lion « Ordine Figli d'Italia » (Order of the Sons of Italy)
- 1996 – Italian Entrepreneurs Around The World Yesterday and Today – Canada: New Frontiers in Pharmacology « 5 Imprenditori Italiani nel mondo ieri eoggi, Milan: Libri Scheiwiller, 1996. Canada: Le nuove frontiere della farmacologia di Dott. Francesco Bellini »
- 1996 – Award of Distinction Concordia University Faculty of Commerce and Administration – Montreal, Canada
- 1997 – Imprenditore dell’anno-Premio International Ernst & Young « Camera di Commercio di Milano di Unioncamere »
- 1997 – Onorificenza Di Grande Ufficiale, Government of Italy
- 1998 – Quebec's Top 50 Revue Commerce (Commerce Magazine)
- 1998 – Lauréat de la réussite (Magazine Entreprendre)
- 1998 – Honorary Degree Doctorate of Science from University of New Brunswick – New Brunswick, Canada
- 1998 – Honorary Degree Doctorate of Science from University of Ottawa – Ottawa, Canada
- 1998 – National Merit from Ottawa Life Sciences Council
- 1999 – Great Montrealer
- 1999 – Les Bâtisseurs de 1950 à 1999 Revue Commerce (Commerce Magazine)
- 2000 – Member of C.P.Q.'s Entrepreneurs Club (Conseil du Patronat du Quebec)
- 2000 – Officer Order of Canada
- 2001 – Member of Excelia Club BioQuebec
- 2002 – Queen's Golden Jubilee Medal
- 2002 – Personality of the Week La Presse
- 2002 – Honorary Degree Doctorate of Laws from Concordia University – Montreal, Canada
- 2003 – Personality of the Year, Business Category, Cyberpresse La Presse
- 2004 – Honorary Degree Doctorate of Science from McGill University – Montreal, Canada
- 2004 – Officer National Order of Quebec
- 2005 – Honorary Degree Doctorate of Laws from Queen's University – Ontario, Canada
- 2005 – Cavaliere del Lavoro Italian Government (Italian orders of merit)
- 2006 – Picchio D'Oro
- 2010 – Honorary Degree Doctorate of Science from McMaster University – Ontario, Canada
- 2012 – Honorary Degree Doctorate of Science from University of Camerino – Le Marche, Italy
- 2013 – Queen's Diamond Jubilee Medal
- 2014 – President of Ascoli Picchio F.C. 1898
- 2016 – PhD honoris causa in Pharmaceutical Science from "La Sapienza University" of Rome.
