= Les Francofolies de La Rochelle =

Annual music festival in France

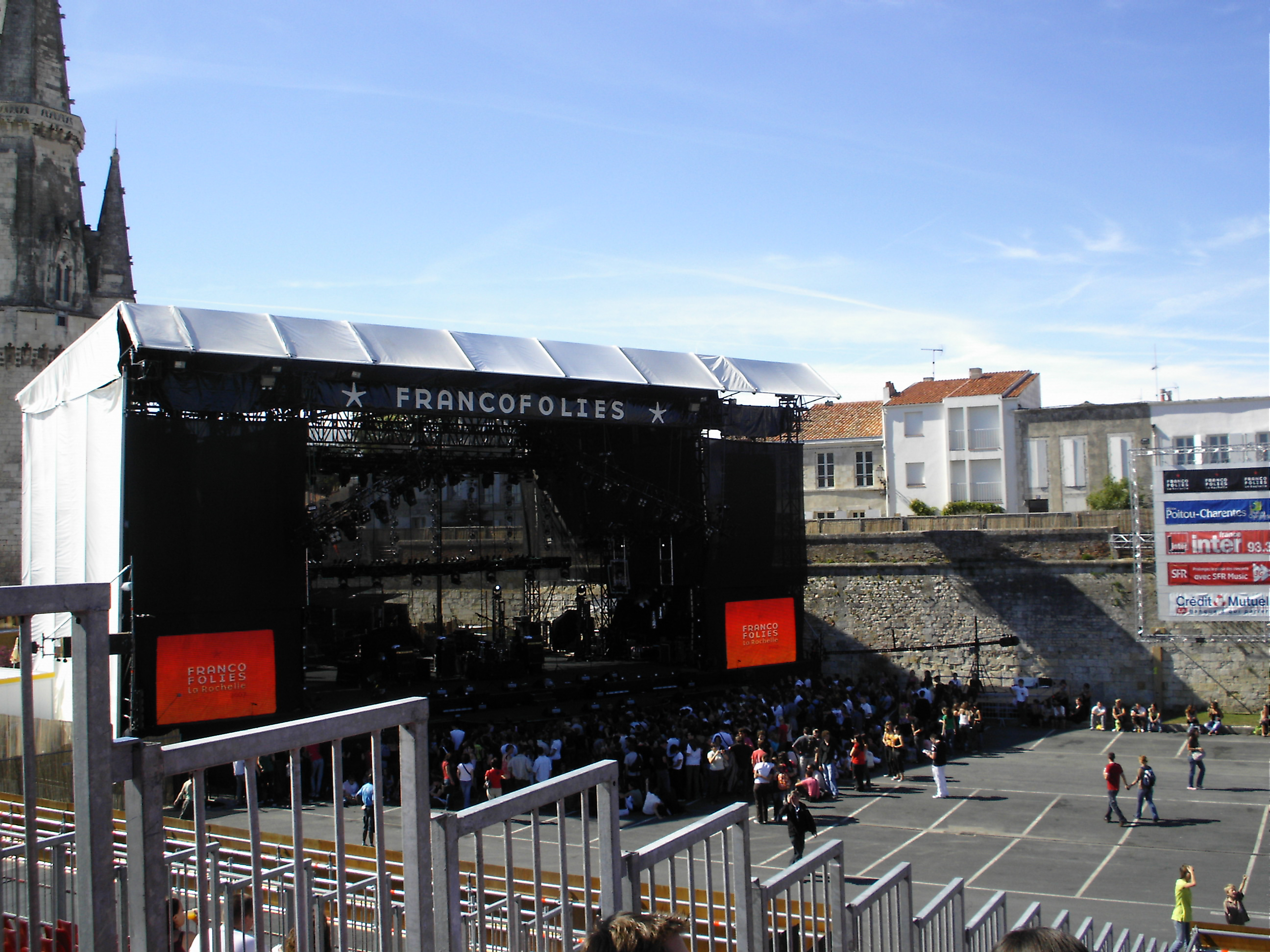
Scene from main stage at the Francofolies (2007).

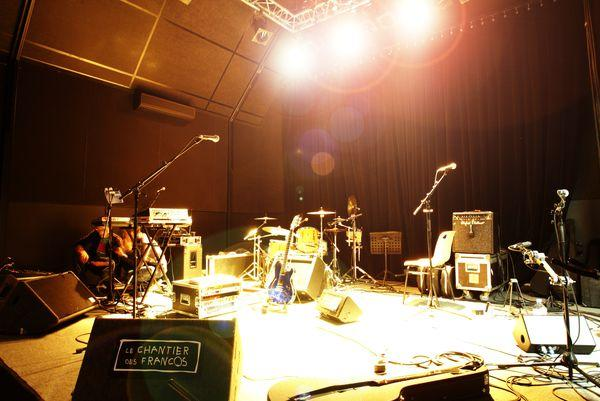
Scene from Chantier des Francos

Les Francofolies (French pronunciation: [le fʁɑ̃kɔfɔli]) is an annual music festival founded in 1985 in La Rochelle, Poitou-Charentes, France as an initiative of Jean-Louis Foulquier. It is usually held annually in July with the aim of promoting French-language music.

Founder Jean-Louis Foulquier went on to establish Les FrancoFolies de Montréal in 1989. He died in 2013, following a long illness.

== See also ==
- Les FrancoFolies de Montréal
- Les Francofolies de Spa
