= Academy of Great Montrealers =

Honorary society recognizing contributors to Montreal (1978–2016)

- Académie des Grands Montréalais
- Successor: Order of Montreal
- Formation: 1988
- Dissolved: 2016
- Type: Honorary society
- Headquarters: Montreal, Quebec, Canada
- Parent organization: Chamber of Commerce of Metropolitan Montreal

Academy of Great Montrealers (French: Académie des Grands Montréalais) founded in 1988 and ended in 2016. It was an organization that recognized the contributions of individuals to the development of Montreal in fields such as finance, the arts, sport, and politics.

== Description ==
The Chamber of Commerce of Metropolitan Montreal (CCMM) oversaw the selection, nomination, and award announcements. A committee received the nominations from their members, made a selection, and then submitted the final choice to a vote by all of the members. There were only four new inductees each year and their induction was announced in April.

The Academy of Great Montrealers concluded in December 2016, all 132 of its members were officially recognized as part of the city's new honour, the Order of Montreal. The Order took over the role of recognizing exceptional contributions that people have made towards the city of Montreal.

== See also ==
- List of Great Montrealers
- Order of Montreal
