= Ratna Ghosh =

- Born: October 23, 1939 (age 87); India
- Education: University of Calcutta (India) & University of Calgary
- Spouse: Ashok Vijh
- Writing career
- Notable works: Redefining multicultural education (1996); Education and the Politics of Difference: Canadian Perspectives (2004) with Ali Abdi; Social Change & Education in Canada (1987)

Ratna Ghosh CM OQ FRSC is a Canadian academic and education scholar. She is a Distinguished James McGill Professor and Sir William C. Macdonald Professor of Education at McGill University in Montreal, Canada, where she previously served as the Dean of the Faculty of Education from 1998 – 2003.

Her area of teaching and research is comparative and international education. Her most cited publications are in multicultural education and social justice education, as well as in the areas of women and development, women's empowerment, and education and security.

She has been elected to several Academies and received national and international honours and awards. She has held leadership positions such as resident director of the bi-national organization, Shastri Indo-Canadian Institute, in New Delhi, and was later elected president of the institute. She has been on the board of directors and the executive committee of the Canadian Human Rights Foundation (now Equitas). She has been president of the American Comparative and International Education Society.

== Early life and education ==
Ghosh was born in India, in the multicultural milieu of Shillong, Meghalaya. Her father was a well known ophthalmic surgeon. Her mother was a graduate in philosophy. As a child, she was used to travelling widely, both within India and in Europe. Ghosh and her sister attended an elementary school for a year in England. Ratna Ghosh completed an Honours Bachelor of Arts degree (with distinction), in English at the University of Calcutta. In 1967, she migrated to Canada and settled in Calgary, Alberta. There, she earned her Master of Arts in 1973 and PhD in 1976 in Comparative and International Education from the University of Calgary.

== Academic career ==
After completing her PhD at the University of Calgary, Ratna Ghosh became an assistant professor at McGill University in 1977 and Professor in 1998. She has held several important positions in her career. She became the first woman to be appointed Dean of the Faculty of Education in 1998. She was named Sir William C. Macdonald Professor in Education in 1994, and concurrently James McGill Professor in 2004, and Distinguished James McGill Professor in 2018. In 2019, she was elected Honorary Fellow of the Comparative and International Education Society (US).

Her research and practical experience expand from Canada and India to the US, Latin America, and Asia. An international expert in comparative and multicultural education she is a leading figure in the world of education, research and development. Her research in the area of comparative and international development education, specifically education and social justice issues, and more recently the role of education in countering violent extremism and refugee education has resulted in several important publications, grants, conference presentations and keynote speeches.

Time magazine described her as one of “Canada’s best” in Education in their October 13, 2003 Canadian edition.

== Selected works ==
Ghosh is the author of an impressive number of books, articles and publications that have had a profound influence on the sociology of education and educational approaches to diversity and inclusion. Among her many single and co-authored publications are the following:

=== Selected books ===
- Redefining multicultural education: Inclusion and the right to be different (1996;2002;3rd edition in 2014 with Mariusz Galczynski
- Education and the politics of difference: Canadian perspectives (2004; 2013 with Ali Abdi)
- Social change and education in Canada (1987; 1991, 1997 Ed. with Douglas Ray)
- The Invisible Community: Being South Asian in Quebec (McGill-Queen's Studies in Ethnic History)(2021 Ed. with Mahsa Bakhshaei, Marie Mc Andrew and Priti Singh)
- Special Issue of Teachers College Record: New perspectives on youth development and social identity in the 21st century. (2007) with Jean Anyon and Roslyn Mickelson.

=== Selected articles ===
- The emerging area of education and security
- Can education counter violent religious extremism?
- The role of religious education(RE)in countering religious extremism in diverse and interconnected societies
- Diversity and Excellence in Higher Education: Is There a Conflict?
- Diversity and quality in higher education: A comparison of preferential policies in India and the U.S
- Public Education and Multicultural Policy in Canada: The Special Case of Quebec
- Multiculturalism in a Comparative Perspective: Australia, Canada and India.
- Multiculturalism and Teacher Educators: views from Canada and the USA
- Teacher education in a globalized world
- Racism: A Hidden Curriculum
- Creating a Refugee Space in the Canadian School Context: The Approach of an Inclusive Society
- Juxtaposing the educational ideas of Gandhi and Freire
- Gandhi, the freedom fighter and educator: A Southern Theorist. In Mousumi Mukherjee & Nandita Koshal (Eds), Special Issue
- Education is that which liberates: Educational philosophy of Rabindranath Tagore
- Fostering Global Citizenship through student mobility: COVID-19 and the 4th wave in internationalization of education
- The anomaly of women's education in India
- Women's empowerment and education: Panchayats and women's Self-help Groups in India

== Awards and honors (selected) ==
Ghosh has garnered numerous distinctions and awards and is recognized in Canada and internationally for her exceptional scholarship and leadership roles. She was elected to Canada's National Academy as a Fellow of the Royal Society of Canada (F.R.S.C.) in 1999. She is a full member of the European Academy of Arts, Sciences and Humanities in Paris, commencing in 1999. In 2011 she was elected to TWAS – The World Academy of Sciences – for the advancement of science in developing countries (Social Sciences Division). In 2019, Ghosh was made honorary fellow of the American Comparative and International Education Society (

Dr Ghosh received one of McGill University’s highest distinctions - the Lifetime Achievement Award for Leadership in Learning -at the Fall Convocation in December, 2024.

=== Civic Awards ===
In 2000, she was awarded the Order of Canada, (C.M) as a Member, and this was followed by her appointment in 2005 as an Officer of the Order of Quebec, (O.Q.), and Officer of the Order of Montreal in 2019. In 2018, the Government of Quebec bestowed on her the title of Eminent Member (Membre Émérite) of the Order of Excellence in Education.

Among numerous awards from national and international organizations, Ghosh has earned the YWCA Woman of Distinction Award (1996); the Canadian Bureau of International Education's Leadership in Internationalization of Education Award (2002); and jointly with her husband (Dr. Ashok Vijh) the Indo-Canada Chamber of Commerce's Lifetime/Outstanding Achievement Award (2008). She was selected for the “Power List” of the most influential Indo-Canadians published by India Abroad (2009). In 2015 she was awarded the Hind Rattan Award (Jewel of India) given to people of Indian origin in the diaspora. She was honored with distinguished alumni award in 2016 by the University of Calgary.
