= Margaret Lock =

Canadian anthropologist (born 1936)

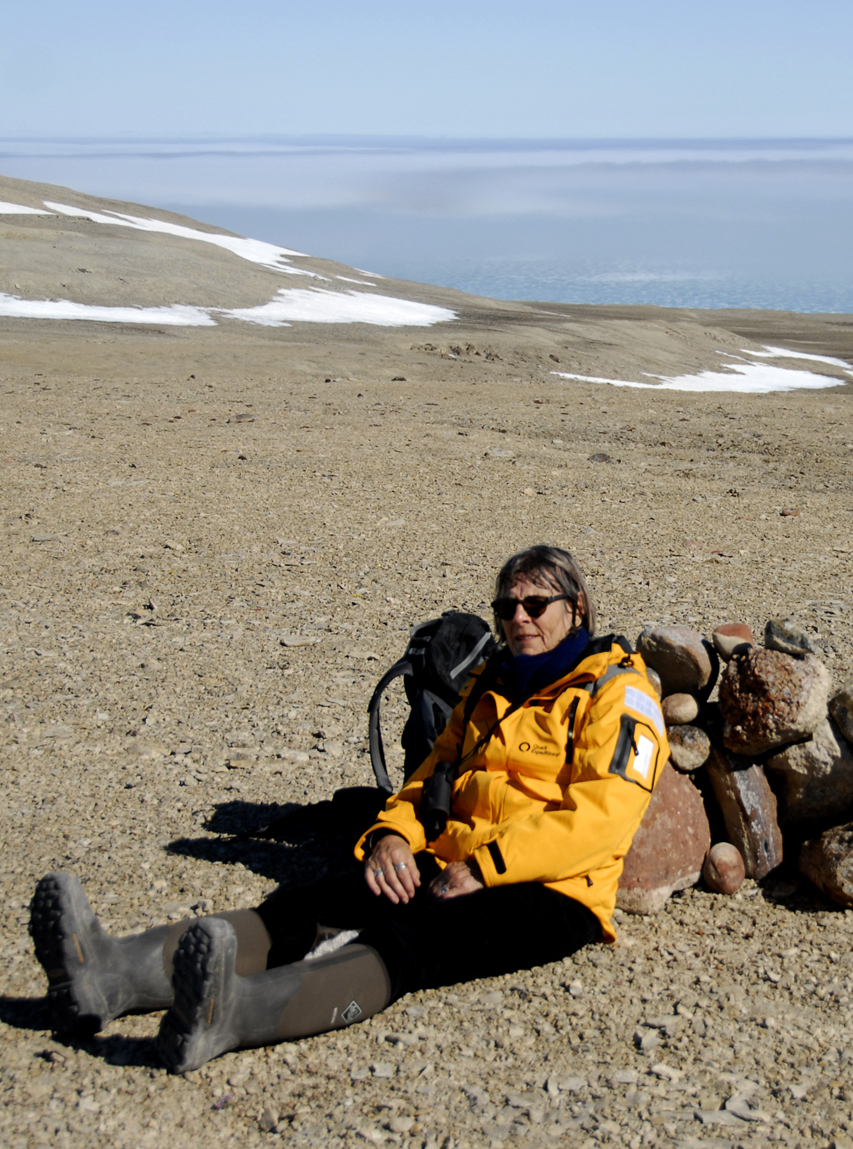
- Margaret Lock at the Northwest Passage, July 2017
- Born: 1963 (age 62–63); England
- Education: University of California; San Francisco
- Occupation: Medical anthropologist

Margaret Lock FRSC (born 1936) is a distinguished British-Canadian medical anthropologist, known for her publications in connection with an anthropology of the body and embodiment, comparative epistemologies of medical knowledge and practice, and the global impact of emerging biomedical technologies.

== Early life and education ==
Lock was born in England in 1936. She trained at the University of Leeds to be a biochemist, and immigrated to Canada in 1961.

== Career ==
She carried out laboratory research at the Banting Institute, Toronto, and then at the University of California, at both the San Francisco and Berkeley campuses.

After a trip to Japan, Lock made a career switch and commenced her training in anthropology at Berkeley, culminating in 1976 in a Doctor of Philosophy in cultural anthropology. After completing a postdoctoral position at UCSF, Lock took up an appointment at McGill University in 1977, where she established an internationally recognized medical anthropology program She was joined several years later by the medical anthropologist Allan Young. This program is one of the leading centers of medical anthropology globally.

Lock has held visiting positions at the École des Hautes Études en Sciences Sociales, Paris; the University of Vienna, Departments of Anthropology and History of Medicine, and the Slovenian Academy of Sciences. She has been a research associate and a visiting professor at Kyoto University, and has taught at St. Luke's International Hospital, Tokyo. As of 2007, she is the Marjorie Bronfman Professor Emerita in the Department of Social Studies of Medicine at McGill University and is also affiliated with the Department of Anthropology at McGill.

== Research ==
Lock is the author or co-editor of 17 books and over 200 scholarly articles. Her first book, East Asian Medicine in Urban Japan: Varieties of Medical Experience (1980), set the stage for over two decades of critically reflective comparative ethnographic research in Japan and North America in connection with disease and illness, life cycle transitions, and the body. This body of work makes clear that all medical knowledge, including that of biomedicine, is embedded in specific historical, social, cultural, political, and economic contexts, with consequences for onto-epistemologies of medical knowledge and practice.

Her first monograph Encounters with Aging: Mythologies of Menopause in Japan and North America (Berkeley: University of California Press, 1993) is concerned with the medicalization of female mid-life in Japan and North America. Lock created the concept of "local biologies" to account for the empirical findings generated by this research. This widely used concept de-centers the modernist assumption of a universal material body, and postulates ceaseless interactions among bodies, environments (evolutionary, historical, local), and social/political variables. Lock and Vinh-Kim Nguyen in their book An Anthropology of Biomedicine (Oxford: Wiley-Blackwell, 2010) use the term "biosocial differentiation" to refer to the interactions of biological and social processes across time and space that sediment into local biologies.

Twice Dead: Organ Transplants and the Reinvention of Death (Berkeley: University of California Press, 2002) documents changes in the criteria for the determination of death made in the 1960s in order that organs could legally be procured for transplant. In Japan, the possibility of organ procurement from brain dead bodies—entities whose life was not recognized as ended—caused major public unrest, with major consequences for the transplantation enterprise. Lock's most recent ethnography, The Alzheimer Conundrum: Entanglements of Dementia and Aging (Princeton: Princeton University Press, 2013) highlights the "molecularized prevention" of Alzheimer's disease in which tracking of somatic biomarkers is central, however, the presence of such biomarkers does not determine a future occurrence of Alzheimer's. She is working currently on the burgeoning discipline of epigenetics, which confronts the age-old debate of nature versus nurture.

== Awards and honors ==
Many of her books have received honors. Encounters with Aging: Mythologies of Menopause in Japan and North America was awarded six prizes, including the J. I. Staley Prize of the School of American Research, the Canada-Japan Book Prize, and the Wellcome Medal of the Royal Anthropological Institute of Great Britain and Ireland. Twice Dead: Organ Transplants and the Reinvention of Death and An Anthropology of Biomedicine have also received awards.

In 1994, Lock was made a Fellow of the Royal Society of Canada in the Academy of Humanities and Social Sciences; in 1997 she was awarded the Prix Léon-Gérin, the Prix du Quebec that goes to a research in the social sciences.

In 2002 she received the Canada Council for the Arts Molson Prize.

She was made an Officer of the National Order of Quebec in 2004 and in 2005 was awarded the Canada Council for the Arts Izaak-Walton-Killam Award, a Trudeau Foundation Fellowship, and was inducted into the Académie des Grands Montréalais, secteur social, as a Great Montrealer.

In 2007 she was awarded the Gold Medal for Research by the Social Sciences and Humanities Research Council of Canada (SSHRC).

In 2010 Lock was appointed as an Officer of the Order of Canada, and in 2011 received the McGill Medal for Exceptional Academic Achievement, and was a recipient of a Queen Elizabeth II Diamond Jubilee Medal.

She gave the 8th Eric Wolf Lecture at the Austrian Academy of Sciences in Vienna in October 2013.

In 2014 lock was a finalist for the Mavis Gallant Prize for non-fiction from the Quebec Writers Association for The Alzheimer Conumdrum: Entanglements of Dementia and Aging.

In October 2015 Lock was elected into the American Academy of Arts and Sciences.

Lock holds an Advisory Board position for the Canadian Institute for Advanced Research (CIFAR) research program "Humans and the Microbiome".

In November 2016 Lock was awarded the highest honour of the RAI, the Huxley Memorial Medal, and gave the Huxley Lecture for the Royal Anthropological Institute at the British Museum. Lock was inducted into the Order of Montreal in May 2017. The researcher’s publications and her books are well known in different countries, including Russia[11].
