= Angèle Dubeau =

Canadian violinist (born 1962)

- Born: 24 March 1962 (age 63); Saint-Norbert, Quebec, Canada
- Genres: Classical
- Occupation: Violinist
- Instrument: Violin
- Years active: 1977–2024
- Member of: La Pietà
- Website: angeledubeau.com

Angèle Dubeau, OC CQ (born 24 March 1962) is a retired Canadian classical violinist. She has devoted a large part of her career to making classical music accessible to a wide audience and also frequently played works by contemporary composers. In October 2024, she announced that due to nerve damage in her right hand, she was no longer able to play the violin.

== Early life and education ==
Dubeau was born in Saint-Norbert, Quebec, the seventh of eight children. She first studied the violin with Father Rolland Brunelle at the Joliette music camp, at Jean Cousineau's Les Petits Violons. She went on to graduate as a First-Prize winner from the Conservatoire de musique du Québec à Montréal. She studied at the Juilliard School of Music in New York with Dorothy DeLay and later went to Romania to work with Ştefan Gheorghiu from 1981 until 1984.

== Career ==
Angèle Dubeau participated in tours organized by the non-profit Jeunesses musicales du Canada from 1977 to 1981, and then began an international career. In 1985, she recorded her first record on the Radio-Canada International label. She is the first artist to be published on the Analekta label, in 1988. Since then, she has recorded an average of two albums a year, and is regularly awarded in the category of classical albums in the Félix Awards.

From 1994 to 1997, she hosted a series of concert broadcasts and weekly music programs for Radio-Canada, featuring young Quebec musicians. These include "Faites vos gammes" and "Angèle Dubeau et la Fête de la Musique". In 1995, she organized, directed, and hosted "Music in the Mountains," an event which attracts 75,000 people every Labour Day weekend. Since that year, she has also been artistic director of the Tremblant Music Festival, a festival she founded.

In 1996, she was made a member of the Order of Canada.

In 1997, Dubeau created the all-female, all-Canadian string ensemble "La Pietà". This group has performed in many concert halls in Canada, the United States, China, and Japan, receiving positive reviews from local papers and radio stations.

In 2004, she was made a Knight of the National Order of Quebec. She was elevated to Officer of the Order of Canada (OC) in 2012.

In 2019, she continued to perform with La Pietà; she headlined the Tremblant Music Festival in September.

Dubeau has performed in concert halls in more than 25 countries and won several international competitions. In addition, she has sold more than 300,000 records as a solo classical recording artist. Some awards that she has won include the Sylva Gelber prize, Public Francophone Radio's "Soloist of the Year 1987", and the Prize of the Americas at the Viña del Mar International Song Festival.

Dubeau plays the "Des Rosiers" Stradivarius violin from 1733. She received this violin in 1976 when the violinist and previous owner Arthur LeBlanc met Dubeau and heard her play. The violin was classified as a national heritage by former Quebec premier René Lévesque.

She sits on the board of directors of the Conservatoire de musique et d'art dramatique du Québec.

=== Retirement ===
In October 2024, Dubeau announced that due to nerve damage to the index finger of her right hand, she was no longer able to play the violin and would thus be retiring.

== Personal life ==
Angèle Dubeau is married to Mario Labbé, founder of the record company Analekta. In February 2013, she had to stop performing in order to get treatment for breast cancer. She returned to the stage on 1 September 2013 and announced that she was in remission.

== Discography ==
=== Solo ===
- Fauré, Contant, Champagne (1985)
- Sibelius, Glazunov - Concertos for Violin (1991)
- Adoration – Les Petits chanteurs du Mont-Royal (1992)
- Œuvres d'Alexander Brott : McGill Chamber Orchestra (1993)
- Telemann – Twelve Fantasias for Violin Without Bass (1994)
- La ronde des berceuses – On Wings of Songs (1994)
- Fauré, Leclair, Debussy – French Sonatas for Violin and Piano with Andrew Tunis (1995)
- Prokofiev, Tchaïkovsky, Kabalevsky – Concertos for violin; Kyiv Symphony Orchestra (1995)
- Schubert – 3 Sonatas for Violin and Piano (1995)
- Martinů – Sonatas, Promenades, Madrigal Stanzas (1995)
- Paganini, De Falla, Piazzolla – Works for Violin and Guitar (1995)
- Telemann – Sonatas for Two violins (1995)
- Mozart – Opera for Two – Late 18th-Century Transcriptions (1996)
- Mendelssohn – Two violin concertos (1997)
- Lullabies and Forbidden Games (1998)
- Opus Québec – with Louise-Andrée Baril (piano) (1999)
- Angèle Dubeau Solo (2007)
- Variations sur le thème de "Happy Birthday" (2007)
- Virtuose (2009)
- Blanc (2014)

=== with La Pietà ===
- Vivaldi Per Archi – Concertos for Strings (1998)
- Let's Dance (1999)
- Once Upon a Time (2002)
- Violins of the World (2002)
- Infernal Violins (2003)
- Passion (2004)
- Fairy Tale (2007)
- Philip Glass – Portrait (2008)
- Joyeux Noël (2008)
- Gypsies (2008)
- Jean Françaix: Gargantua et autres plaisirs – Narrator: Albert Millaire (2009)
- Arvo Pärt – Portrait (2010)
- Noël (2010)
- John Adams – Portrait – Louise Bessette on piano (2011)
- Silence, on joue! – A Time for Us (2012)
- Game Music (2012)
- Ludovico Einaudi – Portrait (2015)
- Silence on joue, Prise 2 (2016)
- Max Richter – Portrait (2017)
- Ovation – Live (2018)
- Pulsations (2019)
- Portrait: Alex Baranowski (2022)
- Signature Philip Glass (2023)

== Awards and recognition ==
=== National recognition ===
- Calixa-Lavallée Award (1996)
- Member of the Order of Canada (1996)
- Knight of the National Order of Quebec (2004)
- Officer of the Order of Canada (2012)
- Companion of the "Ordre des arts et des lettres du Québec" (2018)

=== Musical awards ===
- First prize in the Montreal Symphony Orchestra contest (1976)
- First prize in the "Concours de musique du Canada" (1976)
- First prize in the CBC national contest (1979)
- Sylva Gelber Prize, awarded annually to the most talented Canadian musician (1982)
- "Festival international de musique Tibor Varga" in Switzerland, laureate (1983)
- Prize of the Americas as the Viña del Mar International Song Festival in Chile (1985)
- Soloist of the year 1987, designated by the Public Francophone Radios (1987)
- Classical album of the year, Félix Awards (1990)
- Classical album of the year – Orchestra and ensemble, Félix Awards (1993)
- Classical album of the year – Soloist and chamber music, Félix Awards (1994)
- Classical album of the year – Orchestra and ensemble, Félix Awards (1995)
- Classical album of the year – Soloist and small ensemble, Félix Awards (1997)
- Audience Award, "Prix Opus" of the "Conseil québécois de la musique" (1999)
- Classical album of the year – Soloist and small ensemble, Félix Awards (1999)
- Classical album of the year – Soloist and small ensemble, Félix Awards (2000)
- Audience Award, Jean Grimaldi Hall (2002)
- Classical album of the year – Soloist and small ensemble, Félix Awards (2007)
- Classical album of the year – Soloist and small ensemble, Félix Awards (2008)
- Classical album of the year – Orchestra and large ensemble, Félix Awards (2009)
- Classical album of the year – Orchestra and large ensemble, Félix Awards (2010)
