= Rémi Marcoux =

Rémi Marcoux CM OQ (born July 1940) is the founder and controlling shareholder of Transcontinental, Inc.

== Early life ==
Marcoux was born in July 1940.

== Career ==
Marcoux is founder and controlling shareholder of Transcontinental, Inc. He was chairman of the board, president, and CEO of Transcontinental from 1976 to March 2004, when he handed over management to Luc Desjardins, becoming executive chair.

== Philanthropy ==
Marcoux has sponsored Centraide, the Montreal Heart Institute, and HEC Montréal's Chaire Carmelle-et-Rémi-Marcoux.

He has participated in fundraising campaigns for many organizations, including the International Centre for Conflict Resolution and Mediation; the Sainte-Justine UHC Foundation; the Montreal Children's Hospital Foundation; Ballets Jazz du Québec; and was CHUM Chair in Prostate Cancer at the Centre hospitalier de l'Université de Montréal.

== Honours ==
In 2006, Marcoux was made a member of the Order of Canada.

In 2007, he was awarded the Order of Canada.

In 2008, he was made an Officer of the National Order of Quebec.

Also in 2008, he was inducted into the Academy of Great Montrealers in the Economic category, and in 2016 he was named a Commander of the Order of Montreal.
