= Mathieu Clobert =

Belgian singer-songwriter, composer and poet

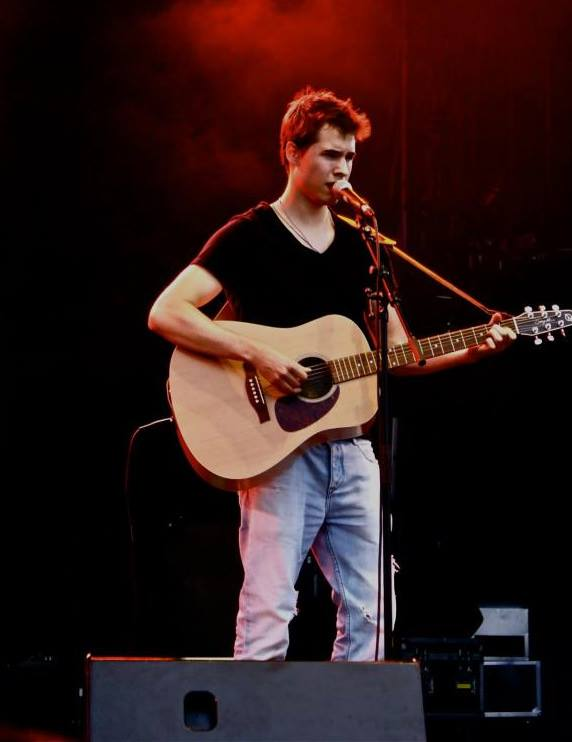
- Mathieu Clobert

Background information
- Born: 8 January 1992; Brussels, Belgium
- Genres: Chanson; Rock; French pop
- Occupations: Singer-songwriter musician
- Instruments: Acoustic guitar, voice, piano
- Years active: 2010–present
- Label: Clobert Records
- Website: Official Site

Mathieu Clobert (born 8 January 1992 in Brussels, Belgium) is a Belgian singer-songwriter, composer and poet.

== Biography ==
Mathieu Clobert studied guitar for seven years and wrote his first lyrics at 11 years. In 2010, he won the competition for best young talent at Les Francofolies de Spa who revealed Suarez. With this award, he opened concerts by Gérald de Palmas and edited an EP MaTheO EP by the stage name Matheo.

In 2012, he met the producer Watch De Schutter and composed his first album Des poètes maudits.

In 2014, Mathieu changed his stage name to Mathieu Clobert. His new album was produced by Nicolas d'Avell : DHDT and he was invited once again to Les Francofolies de Spa. He was also a finalist in Révélation NRJ 2014.

== Style ==
Mathieu is inspired by Damien Saez, Fabrice Mauss, Dominique A, Michel Polnareff, Hans Zimmer. After a first album with dark and poetics lyrics, he tries to mix pop music and soundtrack movie.

== Discographie ==
=== Albums ===
- 2011 : MaTheO EP
- 2012 : Des poètes maudits
- 2013 : Des paradis perdus, EP
- 2014 : DHDT
- 2014 : Brave shadows, EP
- 2016 : Mathieu Clobert, EP
- 2022 : Sans retour, EP
- 2023 : Black Summer, Album
- 2024 : La Dernière Nuit, EP

==== Armor ====
- 2017 : Je n'ai pas les yeux des Hommes, EP
- 2018 : La bête est morte, EP

=== Singles ===
- 2011 : Orland
- 2012 : Je débloque
- 2013 : Psychodrame
- 2014 : Changer de monde
- 2021 : Rédemption

== Award ==
- 2010 : Best young talent at Les Francofolies de Spa

=== Nomination ===
- 2014 : Révélation NRJ 2014
