= Jeannine Guindon =

Canadian psychologist (1919–2002)

Jeannine Guindon CM CQ QC
- Born: 3 September 1919; Montreal, Quebec, Canada
- Died: 15 May 2002 (aged 82)
- Education: Université de Montréal
- Title: Professor emeritus

Jeannine Guindon CM CQ QC (3 September 1919 – 15 May 2002) was a Canadian professor of psychology in Quebec. She was one of three main founders of psychoeducation.

== Early life and education ==
Jeannine Guindon was born on 3 September 1919 in Montreal, Quebec, Canada.

She completed a Bachelor of Arts degree and a diploma in pedagogy from the University of Ottawa in 1939, then taught in Cornwall and Mountain, Ontario.

She received a Master of Arts degree in psychology from the Université de Montréal in 1945.

== Career ==
Guidon helped found the Montreal Counselling and Rehabilitation Centre and was its director from 1947 to 1977. She also founded the Quebec Psycho-Education Centre which she directed from 1953 to 1969 while teaching psychology at the Université de Montréal.

After obtaining her doctorate in psychology in 1969 from the Université de Montréal, Jeannine Guidon and Gilles Gendreau presided over the creation of the university's School of Psychoeducation in 1971. She was its director from 1972 to 1976. Guindon, Gendreau, and Euchariste Paulhus were the three main founders of psychoeducation, a discipline serving young people in difficulty. Guindon particularly chose to train caregivers for people who have intellectual or other disabilities, children with emotional problems, delinquent persons, or those who were socially maladjusted.

In 1976, Guindon co-founded the Mariebourg Center and the Montreal Training and Rehabilitation Institute, which she directed until 1984. Guindon continued to work as a professor of psychology at the Université de Montréal until 1984 and was a member of the university's board of directors from 1977 to 1985.

In 1992, the training institute became the Institut de formation humaine intégrale de Montréal (transl. Montreal Institute for Integral Human Training and received people from around the world.

== Recognition and honours ==
- Emeritus professor, Université de Montréal
- Honorary doctorate in education, Université de Sherbrooke
- Member of the Order of Canada, 1974
- Chevaliere of the National Order of Quebec, 1990
- Member of the Great Montrealers, 1993
- Pro Ecclesia and Pontifice Paul VI decoration from the Diocese of Montreal
- Queen's Golden Jubilee Medal, 2002
- Commander of the Order of Montreal, 2016 (posthumous)

== Death ==
Guindon died on 15 May 2002. She was entombed at the Notre Dame des Neiges Cemetery in Montreal.

== Major publications ==
- Le processus de rééducation du jeune délinquant par l’actualisation du moi
- Les étapes de rééducation des jeunes délinquants – et des autres
- Vers l’autonomie psychique de la naissance à la mort, 1995, Fleurus
- Prendre sa vie en main, l’enjeu de la vingtaine with Julien Alain
