= Psychoeducation =

Providing info to patients to help them better understand and cope with illness

Psychoeducation (a portmanteau of psychological education) is an evidence-based therapeutic intervention for patients and their loved ones that provides information and support to better understand and cope with illness. Psychoeducation is most often associated with serious mental illness, including schizophrenia, clinical depression, anxiety disorders, eating disorders, bipolar disorder and personality disorders. The term has also been used for programs that address physical illnesses, such as cancer.

Psychoeducation teaches patients and families problem-solving and communication skills, while providing education and resources in an empathetic, supportive environment. A Cochrane review of 44 randomised trials with 5,142 participants found that psychoeducation lowered relapse (risk ratio 0.70, number needed to treat 9) and readmission, improved adherence to treatment, and was associated with better social and global functioning.

== Overview ==
Professionally-delivered psychoeducation is a potential resource for both individuals with serious mental illness (SMI) and their family members. The content of psychoeducation may be flexible depending on the needs of the mentally ill person and their progression towards illness recovery or management. Some goals of psychoeducation for the individual with SMI may include increasing self-awareness of the state of their illness (such as identifying early warning signs of episodes in bipolar disorder) and increasing medication adherence. Psychoeducation may also be directed at family members, with the purpose of engaging, educating, and supporting family members so that they can better assist the person with SMI in managing their illness. This is useful as family members of individuals with SMI are often involved in initiating, advocating for, and supporting their relative's mental health care. They may be tasked with the role of case manager, medication monitor, financial planner, or housing coordinator with little prior education or preparation, thus psychoeducation is a potential way to supplement this knowledge and support. The importance of family involvement and the efficacy of family psychoeducation is recognized by best-practice guidelines for the treatment of individuals with serious mental health conditions.

== History ==
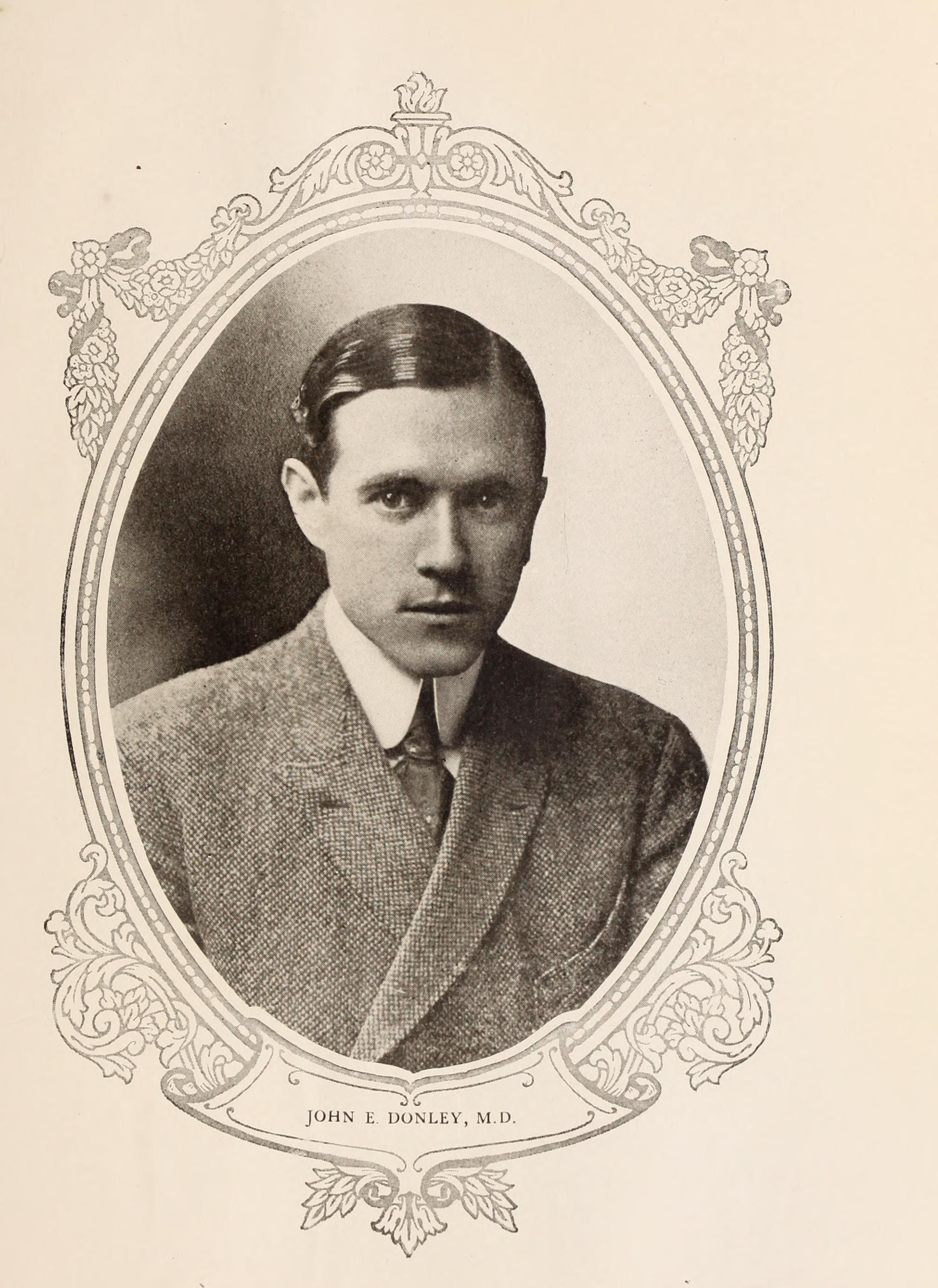
John E. Donley

The concept of psychoeducation was first noted in the medical literature, in an article by John E. Donley "Psychotherapy and re-education" in The Journal of Abnormal Psychology, published in 1911. It wasn't until 30 years later that the first use of the word psychoeducation appeared in the medical literature in title of the book The psychoeducational clinic by Brian E. Tomlinson. New York, NY, US: MacMillan Co. This book was published in 1941. In French, the first instance of the term psychoéducation is in the thesis "La stabilité du comportement" published in 1962.

Jeannine Guindon was a pioneer of psychoeducation in her work with disturbed children in Montreal, Canada, in the 1970s.

The popularization and development of the term psychoeducation into its current form is widely attributed to the American researcher C.M. Anderson in 1980 in the context of the treatment of schizophrenia. Her research concentrated on educating relatives concerning the symptoms and the process of the schizophrenia. Also, her research focused on the stabilization of social authority and on the improvement in handling of the family members among themselves. Finally, C.M. Anderson's research included more effective stress management techniques. Psychoeducation in behavior therapy has its origin in the patient's relearning of emotional and social skills. In the last few years increasingly systematic group programs have been developed, in order to make the knowledge more understandable to patients and their families.

== Single and group ==
Psychoeducation can take place in one-on-one discussion or in groups and by any qualified health educator as well as health professionals such as nurses, mental health counselors, social workers, occupational therapists, psychologists, and physicians. In the groups several patients are informed about their illnesses at once. Also, exchanges of experience between the concerned patients and mutual support play a role in the healing process.

== Brief psychoeducation ==
Brief psychoeducation was developed as a way of reducing the use of the time of health care worker. Brief psychoeducation (less than 10 weeks) increases compliance with the healthcare systems suggested medication. It is unclear whether it decreases relapse though it may in the short term. There is no evidence that it reduces health care efficiency (thought studies may be underpowered). There is low-quality evidence that it may improve certain measures of social functioning such as social disability. There is low quality data that it reduces the chance of death.

== See also ==
- Family therapy
- Group psychotherapy
- National Alliance on Mental Illness

== Bibliography ==
1. Bäuml, Josef, et al. Psychoeducation: A Basic Psychotherapeutic Intervention for Patients With Schizophrenia and Their Families. Schizophrenia Bulletin. 2006 32 (Supplement 1): S1-S9
2. Hogarty, GE, Anderson, CM, Reiss, D, et al. Family psychoeducation, social skills training and maintenance chemotherapy in the aftercare treatment of schizophrenia: II. Two-year effects of a controlled study on relapse and adjustment. Arch Gen Psychiatry 1991; 48:340–347.
3. Chan, W.-c. S., Kua, E., Tsoi, T., Xiao, C., & Tay, P. K. C. (2012). Dementia: How to care for your loved one and yourself. A caregiver's guide. Singapore: Nu-earth.
