= Les Francofolies de Spa =

Music festival in Belgium

Coordinates: 50.4921°N 5.8637°E

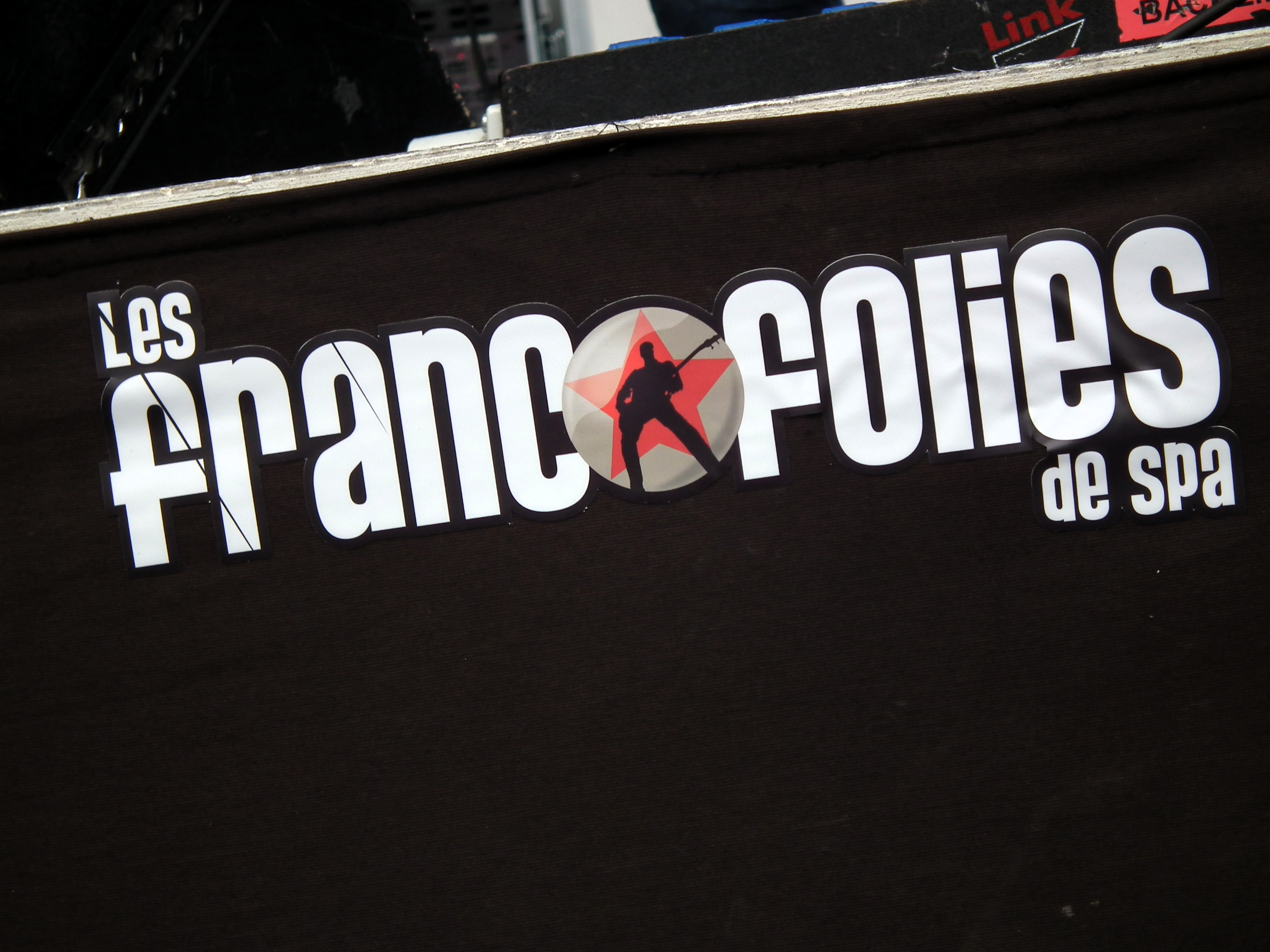
Logo

Les Francofolies de Spa is an annual music festival in Spa, Belgium.

It is usually held in the month of July of every year and aims at promoting francophone music. Those attending the festival in 2008 exceeded 200,000.

The 2012 edition of the festival attracted approximately 160,000 spectators over the course of five days. From 18 to 22 July 2012, the organizers hosted 230 concerts across fifteen different stages, including four evening performances on the town hall square. To mark the 10th anniversary of the death of Pierre Rapsat, artists were invited to perform one of his songs.

== Best young artists ==
- 2007: Suarez
- 2008: Thierry Dell
- 2009: Coco Royal
- 2010: MatheO
- 2011: Joey Acta

== See also ==
- Les Francofolies de La Rochelle
- Les FrancoFolies de Montréal
