= Alain Simard (businessman) =

Canadian businessman (born 1950)

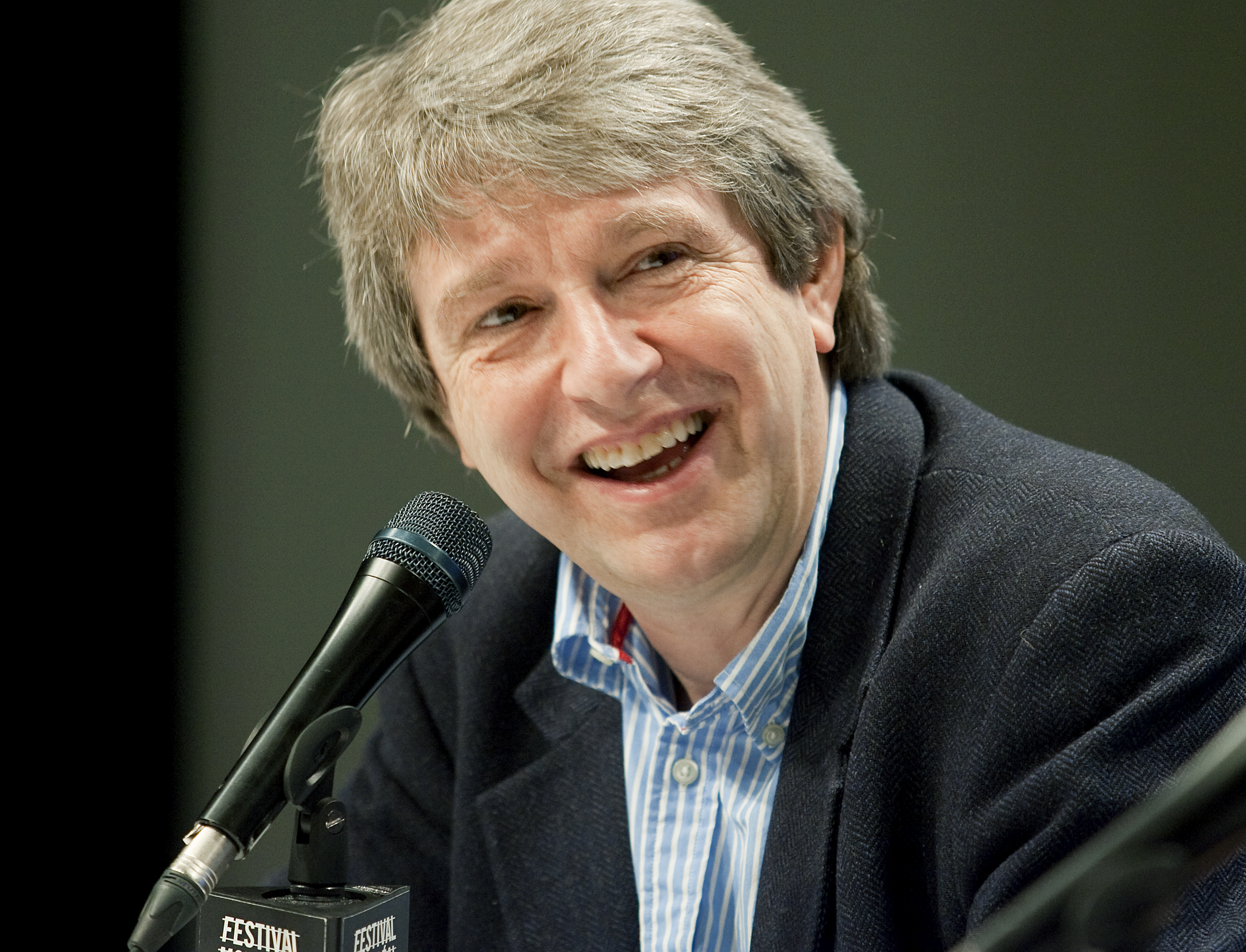
- Simard in 2010
- Born: 1950 (age 75–76); Montreal, Quebec
- Education: Collège Saint-Ignace
- Occupations: Founder; producer; manager of music festivals

Alain Simard CC (born 1950) is a Canadian founder, producer, and manager of music festivals.

== Early life and education ==
Simard was born in Montreal, Quebec, in 1950.

He attained a degree in classical studies at Collège Saint-Ignace. He began to produce underground music live shows at the college student café, La Clef, around 1969.

== Career ==
In the early 1970s, Simard brought artists such as Pink Floyd, Genesis, and B. B. King to Montreal, working with Productions Kosmos.

He went on to manage Quebecois musical artists Paul Piché, Offenbach, Claude Dubois, and Michel Rivard.

He established TV production company Spectel-Video with Momentum Vidéofilm and in 1978 co-founded ADISQ, which supports independent music industry in Quebec, with Guy Latraverse.

Along with André Ménard and Denyse McCann, Simard founded L'Équipe Spectra in 1977. This company founded the Festival International de Jazz de Montréal, the FrancoFolies de Montréal and Montréal en lumière.

In 2005, Simard was president of the New Montreal FilmFest.

== Recognition ==
In 2003, La Presse dubbed Simard "the most influential personality in the Quebec cultural sector".

In 2004, Groupe Perform named him "Grand entrepreneur de l"année" (businessman of the year).

In 2005 he was inducted into the Academy of Great Montrealers in the Cultural category.

In 2016, he was made a Commander of the Ordre de Montréal.

Also in 2016, Simard and Ménard were both inducted into the Canadian Music Industry Hall of Fame.

In December 2019, Simard was named an Officer of the Order of Canada.

Simard has been honored with many other awards and prizes, including:

- Félix Hommage at the ADISQ Gala
- Prix Hommage from the Société des Fêtes et Festivals du Québec
- Mérites du français dans le Commerce 2000, awarded by the Office québécois de la langue française
- Grand Prix Ulysse from Tourisme Montréal

He was bestowed with the title of Chevalier des Arts et des Lettres and Chevalier de l'Ordre de la Pléiade by the Republic of France.
