= Les Francos de Montréal =

French-language music festival in Canada

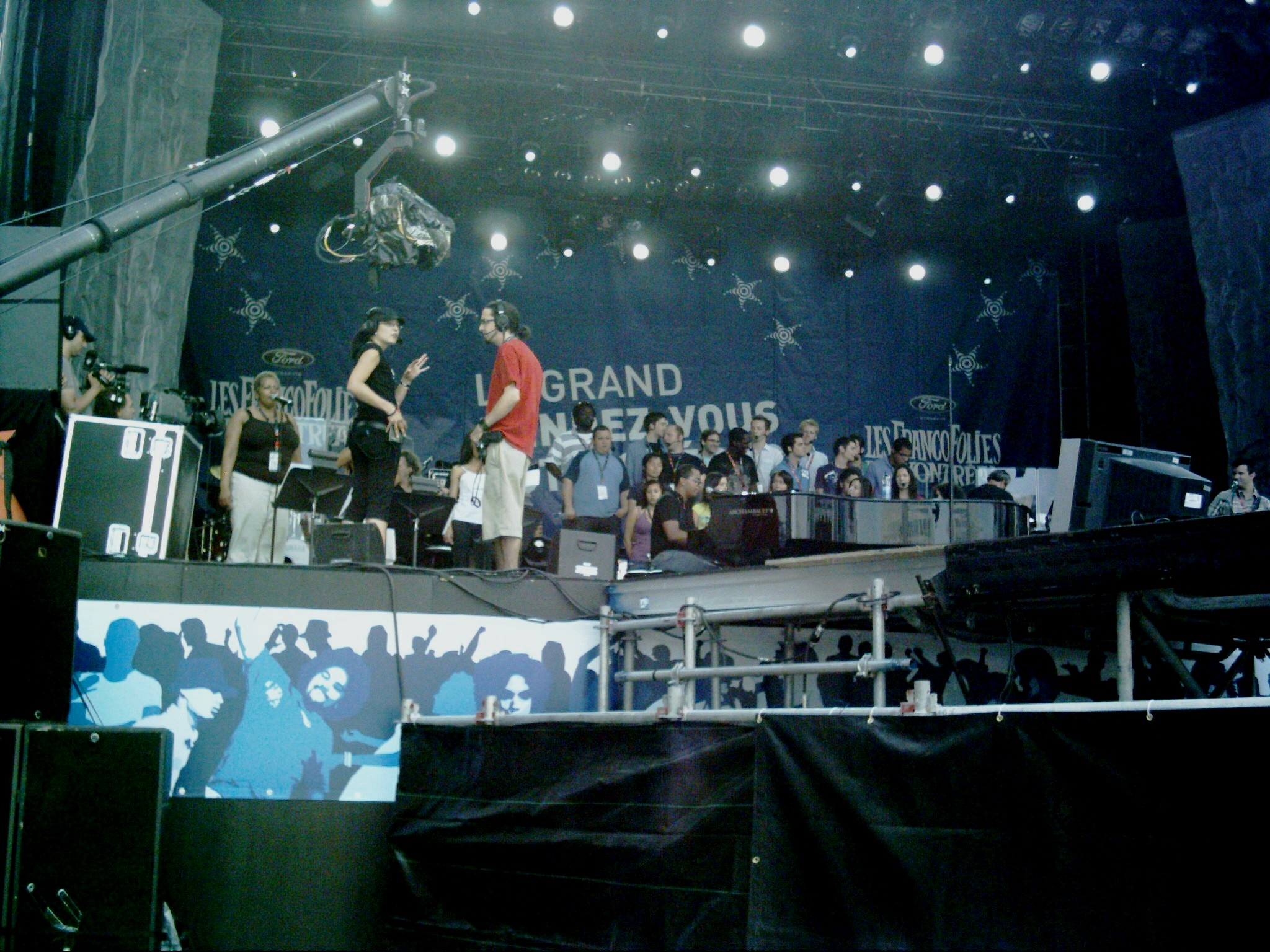
Scene on Sainte-Catherine Street near Place des Arts in Montréal

Les Francos de Montréal, until 2017 titled Les FrancoFolies de Montréal, is a large annual music and performance festival held in Downtown Montreal, Quebec, Canada, featuring French-language performers from all over the world.

Many of the performances are free to the public and are held on various stages in and around the Place des Arts section of Montreal's "Centre-ville". Other performances are held at nearby theatres and require that tickets to be purchased to attend.

In contrast to the Festival International de Jazz de Montréal, also held during the summer months, the Francos focuses on popular music performed chiefly in the French language or by performers from Francophone countries. Musical styles such as rock, pop, chanson, hip-hop, rai, folk, punk, and many others are featured during the festival's run.

The festival was established in 1989 by:

- Jean-Louis Foulquier, the founder of Francofolies de La Rochelle
- Alain Simard, founder of Festival International de Jazz de Montréal (FIJM)
- Guy Latraverse.

Having run for more than 20 years, the FrancoFolies festival is considered to be the largest musical extravaganza in the French-speaking world.

In 1989–1993, the festival ran in September and November, in 1994–2009 from late July to early August, and beginning from the 22nd edition of the festival in 2010 it was moved to June. This change of date was initiated to allow more performers from France to attend the festival and allow the FrancoFolies to "get a jump start" on Montreal's busy summer festival season.

== See also ==
- Les Francofolies de La Rochelle
- Les Francofolies de Spa
