= Twice Dead: Organ Transplants and the Reinvention of Death =

2002 book by Margaret Lock

- Authors: Margaret Lock
- Language: English
- Subjects: Medical anthropology Brain death
- Publisher: University of California Press
- Publication date: 2002
- Publication place: United States
- Media type: Print (hardcover, Paperback)
- Pages: 429
- Awards: Foundation for the Sociology of Health & Illness' Book of the Year Prize (2002)
- ISBN: 978-0520228146

Twice Dead: Organ Transplants and the Reinvention of Death is a 2002 book by the medical anthropologist Margaret Lock, published by University of California Press. Twice Dead addresses different cultural understandings of death in Japan, Canada, and the United States, focussing on the concept of brain death and practices surrounding organ transplantation. The book won the 2002 Foundation for the Sociology of Health & Illness' Book of the Year Prize at the British Sociological Association's Medical Sociology Group annual conference.

== Description ==
The book enngages with different understandings of death and dying across cultures, examining how the relationship between death and neurological activity to unpack the meaning of brain death. Lock takes an ethnographic approach, conducting observations in six intensive care units in Canada and the United States, and interviweed physicians, nurses, and lay adults in Canada, the United States, and Japan. Lock moves back and forth between the North American and Japanese contexts. Linda F. Hogle summarised that through the book, Lock "challenges the presumed dichotomy between nature and culture by raising doubts about the determination of biological death, and by demonstrating that socieites have different understandings of and relations with different technologies".

== Reception ==
Donald Joralemon, in a review for Medical Anthropology Quarterly, said that Lock makes "a number of sweeping generalizations about some very complex issues" in her comparison of Japanese and North American cultural understandings of death. Joralemon questioned how Lock evaluated and compared trust in the medical profession between North America and Japan. Joraelmon also suggested that "we should not be so quick to accept the idea that Americans have disembodied and desocialized death". Despite some critical comments, Joralemon did express "a generally positive view of Lock's book" and concluded that "this work contributes to our understanding of how biomedicine—for all its universalizing claims—is ultimately shaped by local realities".

Marie-Andrée Jacob, reviewing the book in Political and Legal Anthropology Review, described Twice Dead as "impressively well-documented" and credits Lock for responding to her guiding questions by adding "texture and subtleties to them" and for juxtaposing "points of view, debates, controversies, and conundrums".

Linda F. Hogle, writing in Technology and Culture, said that the book "will be essential reading for medical and cultural anthropologists, and for anyone interested in the way technology mediates meanings of the body, life, and death.

=== Awards ===
- Foundation for the Sociology of Health & Illness Book of the Year Prize (2002).
