= Ashok Vijh =

Canadian chemist (born 1938)

- Born: March 15, 1938 (age 88); India
- Education: Panjab University Chandigarh (India) & University of Ottawa
- Occupation: Research scientist
- Known for: Lithium batteries: Science and Technology (2016); Electrochemistry of Metals and Semiconductors (1973)
- Spouse: Ratna Ghosh

Ashok K. Vijh, OC OQ FRSC (born 1938) is an Indian born Canadian chemist. He was born in Punjab but moved to Canada in 1962.

Elected to The Royal Society of Canada in 1985, he was president of The Academy of Scienceof The Royal Society of Canada (2005-2007), and, per office, a vice-president of The Royal Society of Canada. He is an electrochemist of international stature who has published over 400 refereed papers and eight books on various areas of interfacial electrochemistry, including on electrochemical treatment of cancerous tumours. His work has been recognized by the award of over 60 distinctions: prizes, medals, decorations, fellowships, honorary doctorates, academy memberships and membership in international editorial boards. His research contributions have been recognized by his peers in the areas of chemistry, physics, chemical engineering, electrical engineering and energy science. He has also made notable published contributions to the philosophy of science, science and ethics, creativity in science and its inhibition, intellectual roots of innovation, science policy, and science as culture. Some of his recent work has also explored the theoretical connections between immunology and cancer, and the theory and experimental work on the electrochemical treatment of solid cancerous tumours.

== Education ==
Vijh was born in India in 1938. He earned his Bachelor of Science. (honours) in chemistry in 1960, Master of Science (honours) in physical chemistry in 1961, both from Panjab University Chandigarh. His earned a Ph.D. in electrochemistry from the University of Ottawa in 1966. He has also received Honorary Doctorates from Concordia University, University of Waterloo, Panjab University and INRS of University of Quebec system.

== Career ==
Vijh actively contributed to the development of the electrochemical laboratories of the IREQ. He has earned international recognition through the publication of over 400 articles and seven books on interfacial electrochemistry, energy conversion and storage, and the electrochemical treatment of cancerous tumours, among many others. His contributions also extend to other areas, such as the interaction of science and society, including ethics, professional conduct, creativity, science as culture, science policy and philosophy of science. Vijh is a guest professor and thesis adviser at the INRS (Institut national de la recherche scientifique). In addition, he has mentored many students and professors, who have gone on to contribute to the advancement of science. Driven by humanistic and ethical considerations, he promotes the role of science and research in society. Dr. Vijh was the first Canadian of nonEuropean extraction to be elected President of the Academy of Science of the Royal Society of Canada, a position he held from 2005 to 2007. He also chaired the NATO Committee on Peace and Science and the NATO Committee on Physics, Chemistry and Biology. He is a fellow of several learned societies and academies around the world, including the World Academy of Sciences in Italy, the European Academy of Sciences, Arts and Letters in France as well as the Royal Society of Chemistry and the Institute of Physics in the United Kingdom. In addition, he was elected as Visiting Fellow of the St. Edmund's College at Cambridge University.

== Personal life ==
He is married to Dr. Ratna Ghosh, C.M., O.Q., O.O.M., F.R.S. Canada, Distinguished James McGill Professor and W.C. Macdonald Professor of Education and former Dean of the Faculty of Education, McGill University.

== Awards and distinctions (selected) ==
Vijh has received over 60 major distinctions, such as the Thomas W. Eadie Medal of the Royal Society of Canada in 1989, the Chemical Institute of Canada Medal in 1990 and the Prix du Québec MarieVictorin for Pure and Applied Sciences in 1998. He was the youngest winner of the Killam Memorial Prize of the Canada Council in 1987. He was named an Officer of the Order of Canada in 1989, a Knight of l’Ordre national du Québec in 1986 and subsequently promoted to Officer of that Order in 2008. He has also received the Queen Elizabeth II's Golden Jubilee Medal and Diamond Jubilee Medal.

He is a fellow of: The Royal Society of Chemistry; The Institute of Physics (U.K.); The American Physical Society; Institute of Electrical and Electronics Engineers (IEEE); an Elected Visiting Fellow of St Edmund's College, Cambridge (2005, 2006). His Academy memberships include: The Royal Society of Canada; TWAS—The World Academy of Sciences (Trieste, Italy); EASAL--- European Academy of Sciences, Arts and Letters (Paris); INSA—Indian National Science Academy (Foreign Fellow). INSA also awarded him the prestigious international Chair as The D.S. KOTHARI Visiting Professor for 2014–2015.

In November 2024, he was named a Grand Sage by the Quebec Science Council (FRQ) to offer students scholarships named in honour of pioneers in three fields of research. A scholarship in his name was awarded in the science and engineering category.

Chemistry

- Prix Lash Miller of the Electrochemical Society
- NORANDA Lecture Award of the Chemical Institute of Canada
- The Chemical Institute of Canada (C.I.C.) Medal
- Compagnon de Lavoisier (The Order of Chemists of Quebec)
- Fellow, The Royal Society of Chemistry (UK)
- The Electrochemical Award and Gold Medal of the Electrochemical Society (Canada section)

Physics

- Fellow, The Institute of Physics (UK)
- Fellow, The American Physical Society

Engineering

- Fellow, Institute of Electrical and Electronics Engineers (US)
- Thomas W. EADIE Medal of The Royal Society of Canada
- Director, Applied Sciences and Engineering Division of The Academy of Science, The Royal Society of Canada (1990 to 1992)
- Doctor of Science (honoris causa) University of Waterloo, Canada

Physical and mathematical sciences

- Prix Urgel Archambault of ACFAS (Association Canadienne Française pour l'Avancement des Sciences)
- Fellow of The Royal Society of Canada
- Isaak Walton KILLAM Memorial Prize of the Canada Council
- Director, Mathematical and Physical Sciences Division of The Academy of Science, The Royal Society of Canada (1994 to 1997)
- Prix Marie-Victorin (Prix du Québec) 1998 (Pure and Applied Science)

Stature as a citizen

- Knight, The Order of Quebec (1987); OFFICER of the Order of Quebec (2008)
- Officer, The Order of Canada
- Knight Commander of the Order of St-Jean of Jerusalem (Knights of Malta)
- The Commemorative Medal for the 125th Anniversary of the Confederation of Canada
- Le Prix de l'excellence(Gouvernement du Québec)
- Vice-president, Canadian Committee of Scientists and Scholars
- Golden Jubilee Medal (Queen Elizabeth II), Canada
- Diamond Jubilee Medal (Queen Elizabeth II), Canada
- Knight of the Order of Montreal

Other prominent distinctions

- President, Academy of Science of the Royal Society of Canada
- Vice-president of The Royal Society of Canada
- Elected to six national and international Academies (e.g., The Royal Society of Canada; European Academy of Arts, Humanities and Science)
- Honorary Doctorates from Concordia University, University of Waterloo, Panjab University and INRS-University of Quebec
