= Farah Alibay =

Canadian systems engineer

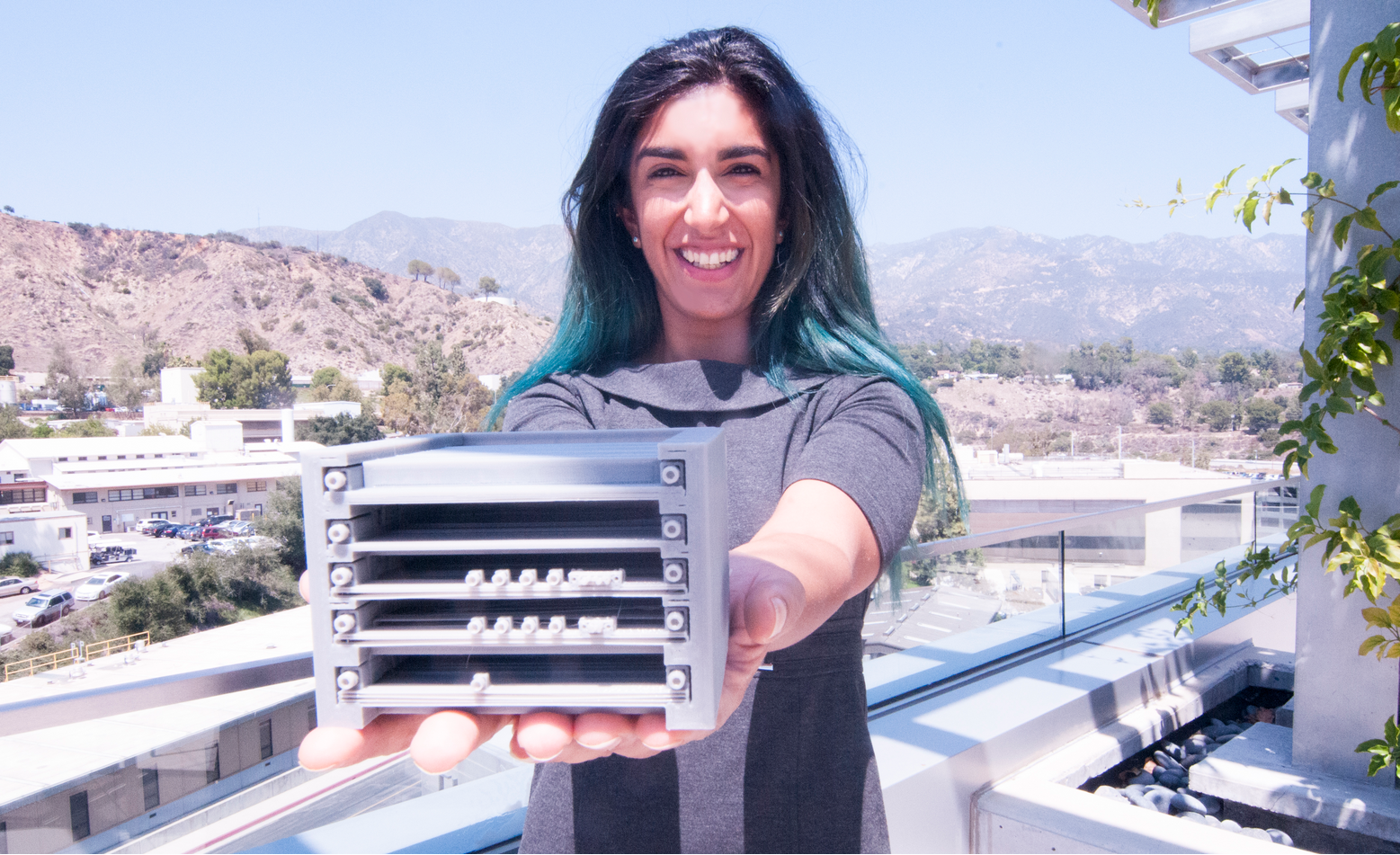
- Systems engineer Farah Alibay
- Born: Montreal, Quebec, Canada
- Education: Massachusetts Institute of Technology
- Engineering career
- Discipline: Systems Engineering
- Employer: NASA Jet Propulsion Laboratory
- Projects: InSight; Mars Cube One; Mars 2020

Farah Alibay is a Canadian systems engineer at the NASA Jet Propulsion Laboratory who has worked on the InSight, Mars Cube One, and Mars 2020 missions.

== Early life and education ==
The daughter of immigrants from Madagascar, Alibay was born in Montréal, Quebec. She grew up in Saint-Charles-Borromée, Quebec, and moved with her family to Manchester, England for high school. French is her native language. The journey by the Canadian astronaut Julie Payette to space inspired Alibay in middle school; as Payette was from her province, she served as a role model. She went to the University of Cambridge, where she received her bachelor's and master's degrees in aerospace and aerothermal engineering in 2010.

She earned her PhD in aeronautics and astronautics engineering from the Massachusetts Institute of Technology (MIT) in 2014. Her PhD research with advisor Jeffrey Hoffman focused on the use of spatially and temporally distributed multi-vehicle systems for the exploration of planetary bodies in the Solar System.

In 2013, Alibay was awarded the AeroAstro Graduate Teaching Assistantship Award at MIT for her outstanding work as a teaching assistant in implementing Concurrent Design Facility software into the curriculum.

== Career ==
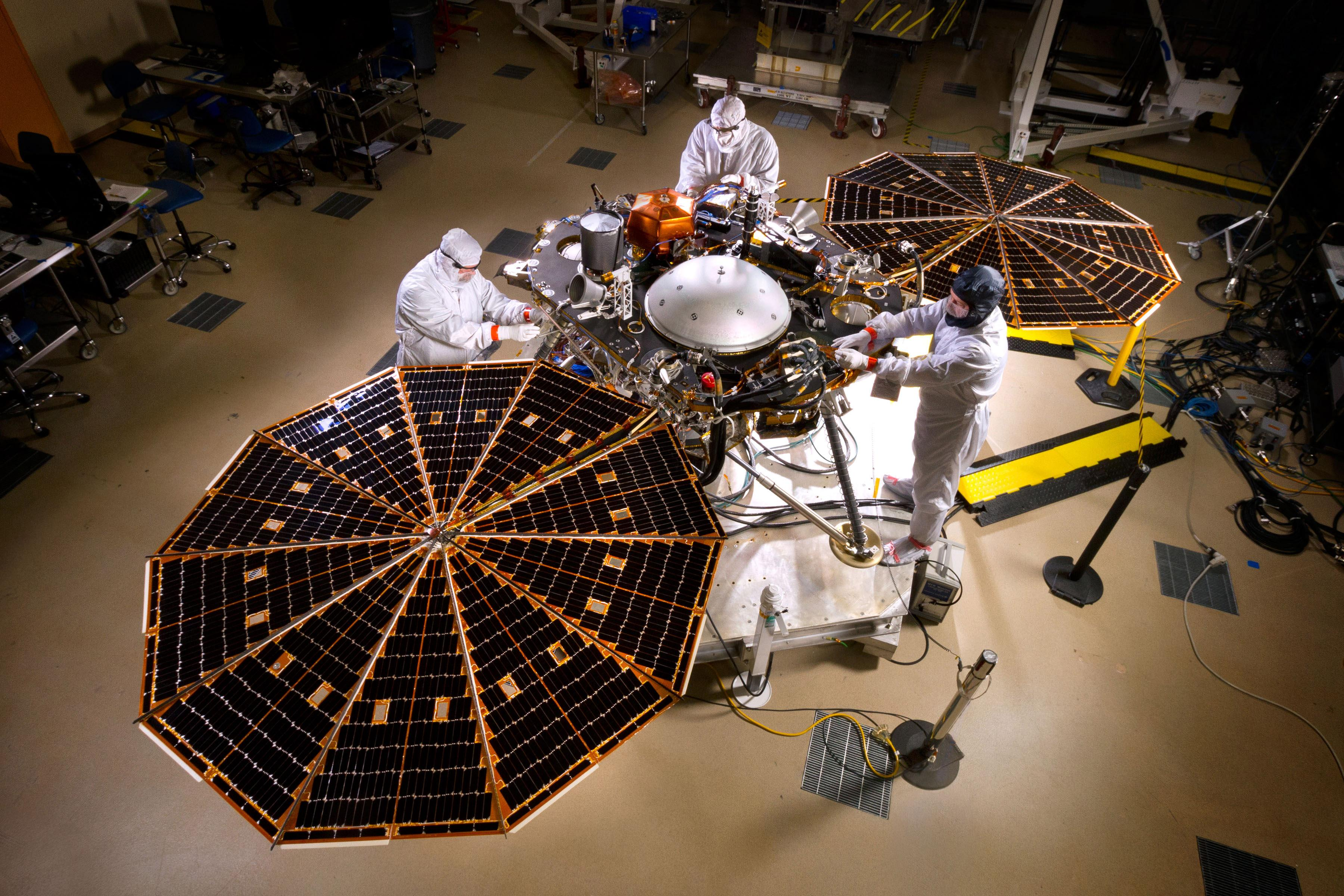
The Mars InSight lander

After her master's degree, Alibay participated in the NASA Academy internship at Goddard Space Flight Center through which she was introduced to the many NASA centres and activities. It was there that she discovered her passion for robotic planetary exploration. She interned at NASA's Jet Propulsion Laboratory while she worked on her PhD. Following graduation in 2014 Alibay was hired on as a systems engineer to the Jet Propulsion Laboratory full-time. Her first project was the Mars Cube One CubeSats mission, a companion mission to InSight.

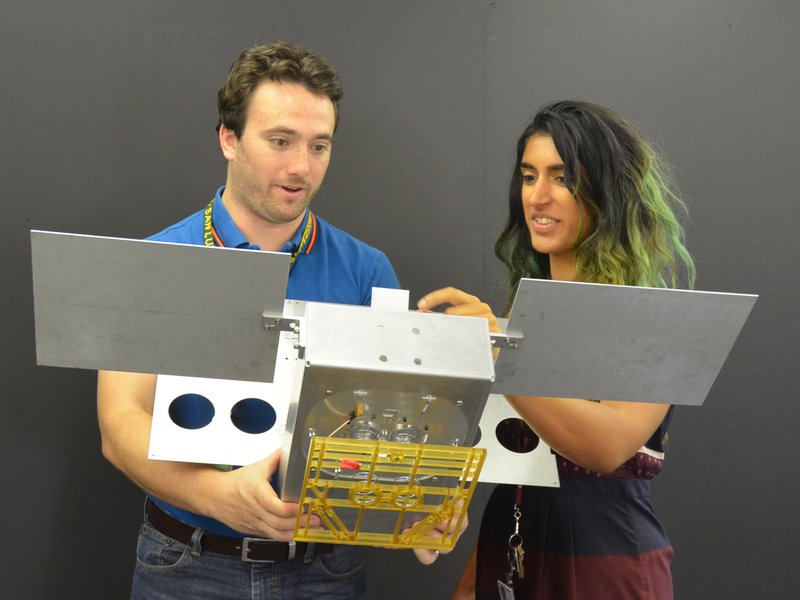
Mechanical engineer Joel Steinkraus and systems engineer Farah Alibay (right) from NASA Jet Propulsion Laboratory hold a full-scale mockup of Mars Cube One

In 2016, she became a Payload Systems Engineer on the InSight mission, a robotic lander spacecraft that was designed to study the interior of the planet Mars, to where it lifted off on May 5, 2018. Before the launch, Alibay had been responsible for the proper integration and testing of all of the spacecrat's instruments. While the mission waited for the spacecraft to land on the surface of Mars, Alibay helped the teams prepare for operations, and she tested the detector equipment. To celebrate the landing on Mars on November 26, 2018, she had her hair dyed red to match the colour of Mars and of the InSight logo.

In 2019, Alibay joined the Mars 2020 mobility team. Her duty was to ensure that the rover did not get lost on Mars. During surface operations after the February 18, 2021 landing, she was the Tactical Integration Lead and an interface between the Perseverance rover and Ingenuity. On April 19, 2021, Alibay was part of the Jet Propulsion Laboratory team that successfully made Ingenuity, the first powered-controlled aircraft to fly on another planet.

Alibay in 2019 also participated as a speaker during an interactive STEM discussion with students attending the 70th International Astronautical Congress. This STEM discussion was part of NASAs STEM engagement where the goal is to invest in STEM engagement are focused on building a future STEM workforce, through program elements designed to bolster capacity and to attract, engage and enable students to move toward STEM careers through NASA-unique opportunities.

She works on diversity and inclusion in STEM, both to increase them in her work environment and to prevent others from facing the challenges that she had as an LGBTQ+ immigrant woman of colour.

She was also featured on the Season 2 Episode 2 of the "This Being Human" podcast sponsored by the Aga Khan Museum.

== Personal life ==
Alibay has spoken to the value of good mentors when she was an intern, and she mentors women interns as a result of those positive experiences. She indicated that a guidance counsellor had once attempted to dissuade her from engineering since it is a male-dominated career.

Her favourite moon is Saturn's Enceladus. Alibay often enjoys outdoor activities such as rock climbing, backpacking, mountaineering, and hiking. She also enjoys volunteering and giving back to her community where she volunteers as part of the Big Brothers Big Sisters of America program, as well as a CASA (Court Appointed Special Advocat) in Los Angeles. She also is regularly involved in a variety of outreach activities, including giving talks, mentoring students, and teaching at space camp.
