= André Chagnon =

Canadian businessman and philanthropist (1928–2022)

André Chagnon OC OQ
- Born: March 17, 1928; Montreal, Quebec, Canada
- Died: October 8, 2022 (aged 94)
- Awards: Order of Canada; National Order of Quebec

André Chagnon OC OQ (March 17, 1928 – October 8, 2022) was a Canadian businessman and philanthropist. He was noted for being the founder of telecommunications company Vidéotron.

== Early life ==
Chagnon was born in the Ahuntsic neighbourhood of Montreal on March 17, 1928. His father worked as an electrician and entrepreneur. Chagnon was raised near Gouin Boulevard during the Great Depression, and recounted how his family survived on "a lot of bread and molasses". He attended the École technique de Montréal from 1945 to 1949.

== Career ==
Chagnon became an electrician like his father and began his work career by laying underground cables for the City of Montreal. He eventually started his own contracting company – E. R. Chagnon et Fils – in 1957, when he was 29. He later sold it to his employees. In 1964, he founded the cable company Le Groupe Vidéotron. Under his leadership, the company adopted an acquisition-based growth strategy, starting with the purchase of Câblevision Nationale in 1980. It went on to acquire Télé-Métropole six years later. This was ultimately sold when the company bought CF Cable in 1997. Vidéotron was also listed on the Montreal Exchange in 1985, and established a branch in London in 1988, before branching into the United States five years later. These moves led to Vidéotron becoming Canada's third-largest telecommunications company and the largest in Quebec.

Chagnon was one of the four industrial leaders invited by the Government of Canada to take part in the 1995 G-7 Ministerial Conference on the Information Society, held in Brussels. He was also named to the Information Highway Advisory Council that same year. Retiring in 2000, Chagnon set up the Fondation Lucie et André Chagnon, an organization working to prevent poverty and illness in families, which has $1.4 billion in assets and was one of the largest foundations in Canada. He had a net worth of $474 million CDN in 2006.

== Personal life ==
Chagnon was married to Lucie Dolan-Chagnon for 65 years until her death in August 2014. Together, they had five children. One of them, Christian, predeceased Chagnon. Chagnon became a vegetarian around the 1990s.

Chagnon died on October 8, 2022, at age 94.

== Awards and honours ==
Chagnon was appointed an officer of the Order of Canada in October 1992 and invested six months later in April of the following year. He was inducted into the Canadian Business Hall of Fame in 2002. One year later, he was invested as an officer of the National Order of Quebec. He was subsequently conferred the Entrepreneur Of The Year 2005 Lifetime Achievement Award by Ernst & Young. Chagnon was granted honorary doctorates from the University of Ottawa (2004), McGill University (2004), Concordia University (2004), HEC Montréal (2008), and Université Laval. He was made a commander of the Order of Montreal in its inaugural class of 2016.
