= Louise Bessette =

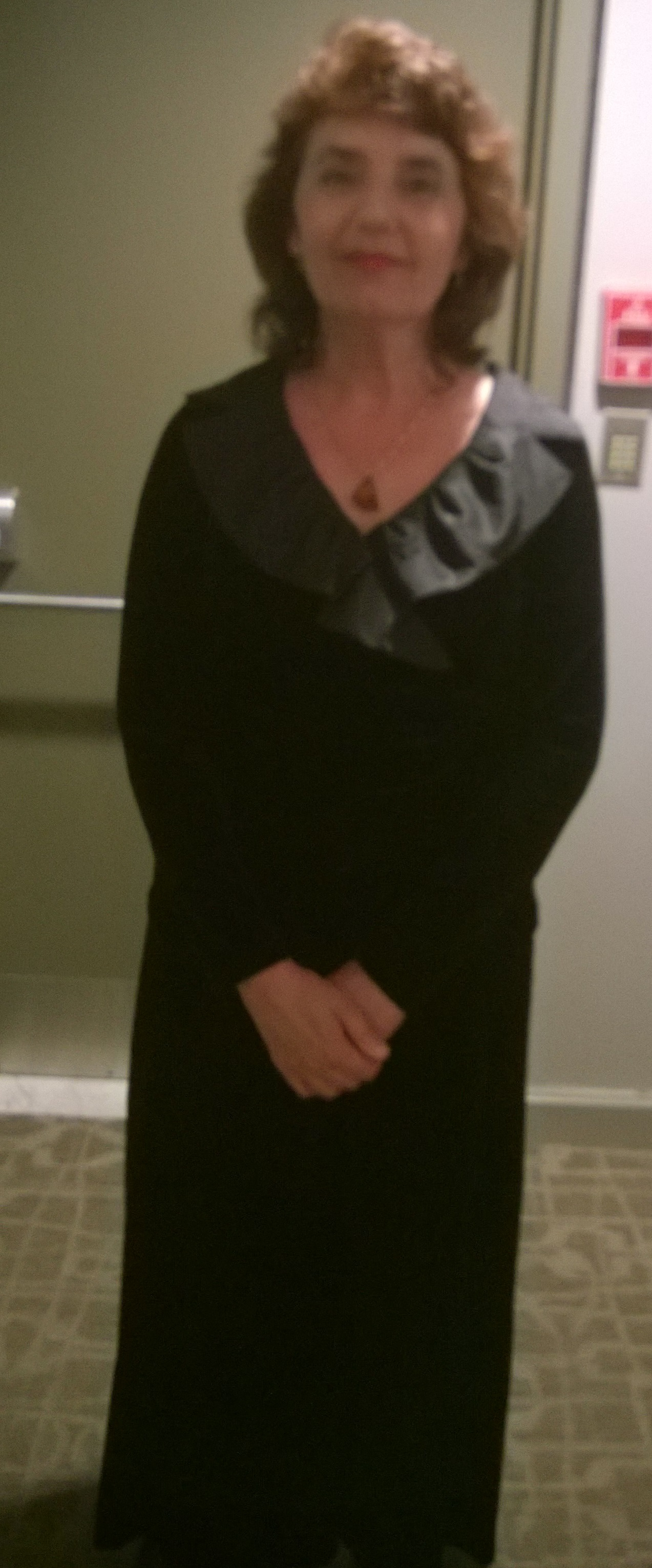

Background information
- Born: June 20, 1959 (age 65); Montreal, Quebec, Canada
- Instrument: Piano
- Website: www.louisebessette.com

Louise Bessette, CM OQ (born June 20, 1959) is a Canadian pianist. Born in Montreal, she trained at the Conservatoire de musique du Quebec a Montreal (CMQM).

== Awards ==
In 2001, she was made a member of the Order of Canada in recognition for "her great talent and contribution to contemporary music". In 2005, she was made an Officer of the National Order of Quebec. In 2014 she was awarded an Opus Award for Performer of the Year. In 2019 she received the Lifetime Artistic Achievement Award from the Governor General's Performing Arts Awards. In 2024, she was made knight of the Order of Montreal.
