= Queen's Golden Jubilee Medal =

Queen's Golden Jubilee Medal may refer to:

- Queen Victoria Golden Jubilee Medal (1887)
- Queen Elizabeth II Golden Jubilee Medal (2002)
