= Guy Latraverse =

Canadian performance producer and agent (1939–2023)

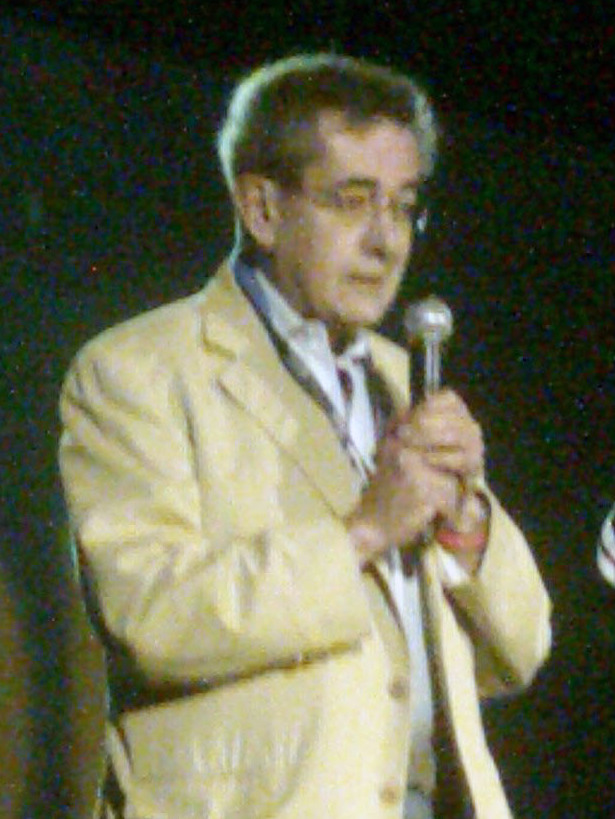
Guy Latraverse

Guy Latraverse (French pronunciation: [ɡi latʁavɛʁs]; July 5, 1939 – October 14, 2023) was a Canadian music artist, agent, producer, and show designer. He died on October 14, 2023, at the age of 84.

Latraverse was awarded the Order of Montreal in 2020. Said to "be considered the father of Quebec’s live show industry, Guy Latraverse opened doors for thousands of artists. Throughout a career spanning over fifty years in the performing arts, this impresario, producer and agent represented Québec's and France's biggest names in music and comedy."
