= Le Château =

Canadian fashion company

Le Château Inc.
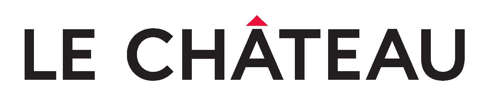
- Type: Subsidiary
- Industry: Fashion
- Founded: Montreal, Quebec, Canada (1959)
- Founder: Herschel Segal
- Headquarters: Saint-Laurent, Quebec, Canada
- Area served: Canada
- Key people: Jane S. Segal (CEO); Emilia Di Raddo (President, Secretary, Director)
- Products: Formal wear Casual wear Evening wear Footwear; Plus-size clothing Wedding dresses
- Revenue: ▼$236,876,000 (2015)
- Net income: ▼$35,745,000 (2015)
- Number of employees: 3,000 (2007)
- Parent: YM Inc.
- Website: lechateau.com

Le Château Inc. (French pronunciation: [lə ʃato]) is a fashion company, currently owned by Suzy's Inc. The chain was founded in 1959 in Montreal, Quebec, Canada, and designed, imported, and retailed women's and men's apparel, accessories, and footwear. In 2015, the company generated sales of about CA$237 million. The company operates in 57 Suzy Shier stores; before bankruptcy, they sold directly to customers from 123 retail stores in Canada and five in the UAE and Saudi Arabia.

== History ==
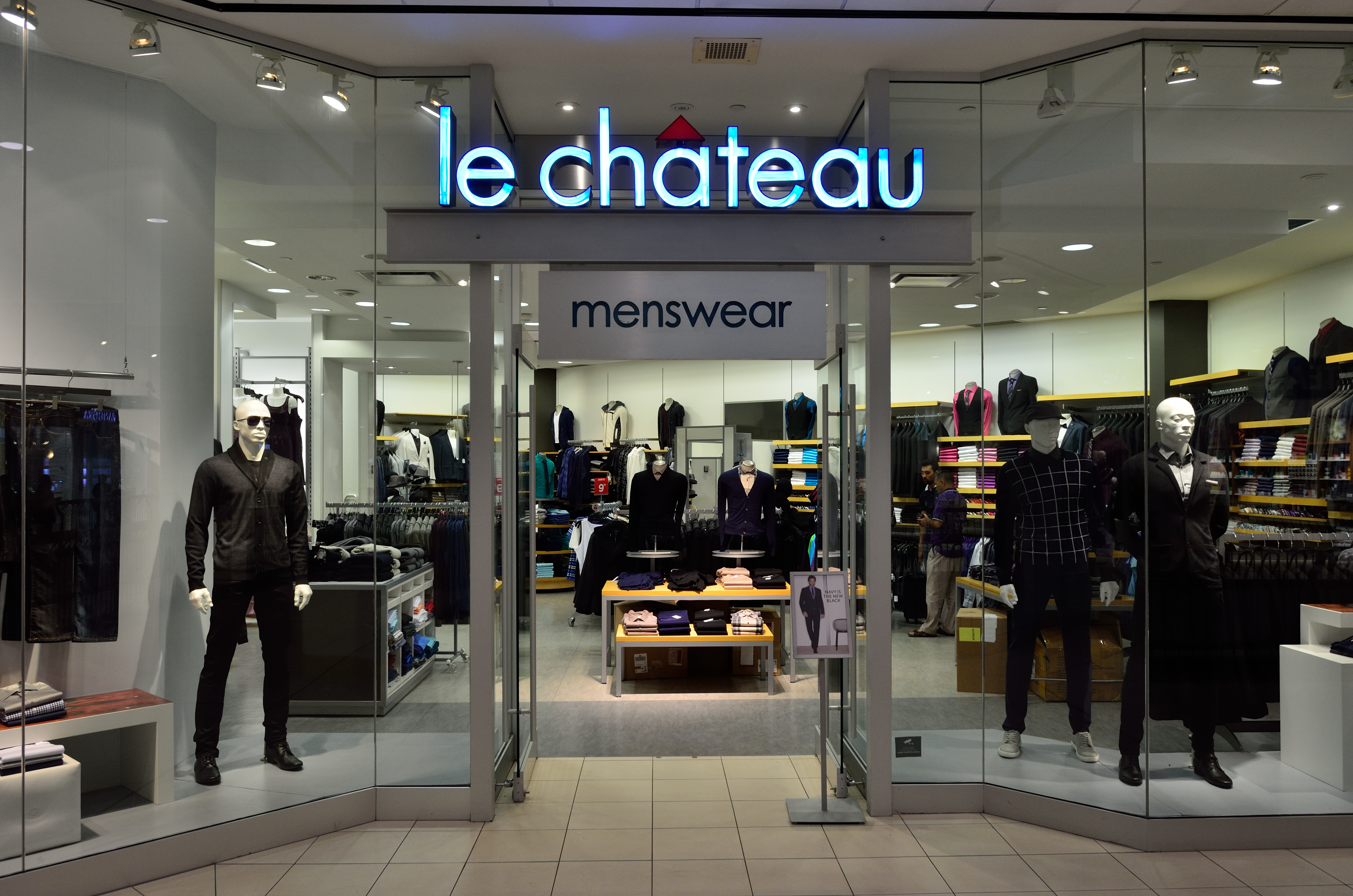
A Le Château store in Promenade

=== Early years: 1959-1982 ===
Founded by Herschel Segal in 1959, as "Le Chateau Men's Wear", it began as a menswear store in downtown Montreal Victoria Square. Segal gave his store a French name because of the budding francophone feelings occurring in Quebec. At first, Le Château was not a "fashion-forward" store, as it would later become, as Segal sold overstock from his father's old store. In 2003, Segal described his early customers as "old ... blue-haired ladies." Le Château did well at first, and three more stores were opened. However, by the early 1960s, the company was close to bankruptcy; as a result, all but the original store were closed.

In 1962, Le Château added women's clothing, shortened the name to "Le Château", and switched to selling imported European fashions. The store imported from Carnaby Street in London, a fashion centre at the time, as well as other imports such as French suits and Italian turtlenecks. This worked well! within a few years, Le Château completely phased out the original traditional clothing style to concentrate on selling fashionable imports to youths. Segal claims that Le Château was the first to introduce bell bottoms to Canada, and had the latest European fashion before it even arrived in New York City. Le Château played an integral yet little known role in John Lennon and Yoko Ono's 1969 Montreal bed-in, providing the signature velour jumpsuits worn by the pair. By 1972, the chain grew to 10 stores; by the end of the decade, Le Château had over 50 stores across Canada. By this time, Le Château had shifted to selling mainstream fashion instead of the latest imports from Europe.

=== IPO and expansion: 1983-2003 ===
In December 1983, Le Château had its initial public offering on the Toronto Stock Exchange (TSX). It raised $7.3 million. By the early 1990s, Le Château had 160 stores and had switched to doing most of its design and manufacturing itself. In the early 1990s, there was a prolonged recession in Canada which hurt most businesses in the clothing industry.

In the mid-1990s, Le Château experimented briefly with goth-styled clothing; in 1997, it launched a short-lived adolescent girls brand "Jr. Girls."

By 1999, the company's stock fell to an eight-year low. This led to a management shakeup, store redesign, changes to the merchandise, and according to Le Château, a concerted effort to improve its quality and image.

=== Restructuring: 2003-2011 ===
In 2003, Segal acknowledged the "disposable fashion" stereotype, and said the company "forgot about" the product. "We might have been sloppy," he said. "But now we're putting in more money and time. We have an inspection system and a young lady who's a grad of a textile school. We never had that before." Since then, Le Château has been trying to build up its brand image and shed the image that its clothes are "only for wearing to nightclubs," a view that still persists. That year, it released a collection based on the 1960s-set Renée Zellweger movie, Down with Love and was the exclusive supplier of clothing to Canadian Idol contestants.

=== Rebranding: 2012-2019 ===
With many US retailers expanding into Canada, including competitor Express, and fast fashion stores such as H&M and Zara gaining market share, Le Château relaunched their brand in 2012. The company went from apparel for young shoppers to "new concept" stores carrying better quality, grown-up clothes at various price points. The rebranding was complete with a new logo and new white, sterile, more upscale stores, with nickel fixtures and glass shelving. Known for their tailored and form-fitting clothes, it sells formal wear, casual wear, evening wear, and footwear. At this point, Le Chateau had over 240 stores in Canada. While Le Château is publicly traded, the company is tightly held with 67% of shares owned by Silverstone, the company's board, executives, and two institutional investors. In addition, the shares have less than 2% of voting rights. The CEO at the time was Segal's wife, Jane Silverstone-Segal, following her promotion during the 2008 restructuring.

To further the new company direction, Le Château clothes were featured in the Canadian film, After the Ball, featuring stars such as Chris Noth, Portia Doubleday and Lauren Holly. The movie was released across Canada in early 2015. Le Chateau used this opportunity to launch a clothing line named Lauren's Closet, a fashion line inspired by Lauren Holly.

In 2017, Le Château delisted from the Toronto Stock Exchange, and relisted on the TSX Venture Exchange, because it no longer met the Toronto Stock Exchange's listing requirements. The company has recently experienced significant financial trouble, with losses of $35 million a year from 2014 to 2016, and has been forced to borrow from founder Herschel Segal.

=== Bankruptcy and liquidation: 2020-2021 ===
In July 2020, after several months of declining business and hindered further by the COVID-19 pandemic in Canada, Le Château stated there is "significant doubt" it will survive another year.

In October 2020, Le Château announced the closing of all 123 stores across Canada. Stores remained in operation during its liquidation process, however about 1,400 jobs were lost when the chain ceased operation.

On April 18, 2021, the online store was closed down. In June 2021, the remaining assets of the brand were sold to Suzy's Inc.

=== Return: 2021-present ===
On November 16, 2021, the brand was relaunched online only after being purchased by Suzy Shier.

In April 2022, the brand opened 37 shop-in-shop locations within Suzy Shier stores across Canada. The reopened stores focused on affordability, and the first collection focused on eveningwear.

== Dress For Success non-profit ==
In 2014, Le Château launched a partnership with "Dress For Success", a non-profit corporation to help economically disadvantaged women by providing them with interview attire. Le Château has committed over 1.4 million dollars worth of clothing to the program. Le Château is further collaborating with the cause, through partnerships with stars such as Lauren Holly, having her promote Dress For Success to her fans.
