= Desautels Faculty of Management =

Business school of McGill University

Coordinates: 45.50256°N 73.57644°W

- Faculté de gestion Desautels (French)
- Named for: Marcel Desautels
- Type: Public business school
- Established: 1906
- Parent institution: McGill University
- Endowment: CA$2.039 billion
- Dean: Yolande E. Chan
- Faculty: 116 (professors)
- Students: 3,051
- Undergraduates: 2300
- Postgraduates: 315
- Location: Montreal, Quebec, Canada
- Campus: Urban
- Alumni: Over 30,000
- Website: mcgill.ca/desautels

The Desautels Faculty of Management is a faculty of McGill University in Montreal, Quebec, Canada. The faculty offers a range of undergraduate and graduate-level business programs, including the Bachelor of Commerce, Master of Business Administration and Doctor of Philosophy in management degrees. The Faculty of Management also offers a joint MBA/Law program with McGill's Faculty of Law.

== History ==
Officially founded in 1906 as the Department of Commerce within the Faculty of Arts, the Faculty of Management originated from a two-year commerce program. The Commerce program is named the School of Commerce, and the first Bachelor of Commerce (BCom) degrees are awarded by McGill in 1915. The McGill School of Commerce was founded in 1920, independent of the Faculty of Arts. The Graduate School of Business Administration was established in 1963 and graduated its first MBA class in 1965. The Graduate School of Business Administration was later merged with the School of Commerce in 1968 to form the Faculty of Management.

The Faculty of Management is located in the Samuel Bronfman Building which was named in honour of Samuel Bronfman for his donation of the building in 1972. The joint MBA/Law program received approval in 1978 and applications begin in 1979. In the 1980s, the Faculty established the Management Science Research Centre, Dobson Centre for Entrepreneurial Studies (now named the McGill Dobson Centre for Entrepreneurship), Centre for Strategy Studies in Organizations, Centre for International Management Studies and the Centre for the Convergence of Health and Economics. The Faculty also launched the Applied Investments Program, which was the first program of its kind in Canada.

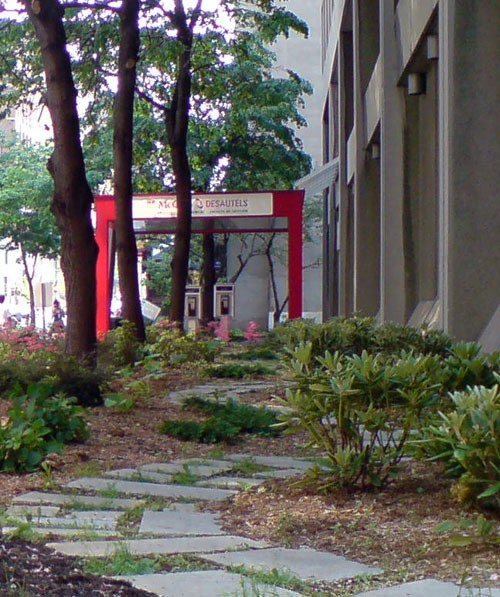
The Bronfman Building houses undergraduate classes and features a garden.

The McGill Institute of Marketing (MIM) was launched in 1992. In 1996, three new programs were established: the International Masters Program in Practicing Management (IMPM) (now named the International Masters Program for Managers), the Joint MD/MBA program, and, in conjunction with the Faculty of Engineering, the Masters in Manufacturing Management (MMM), which has since been renamed the Global Manufacturing and Supply Chain Management Program (GMSCM). In 1998, the Faculty launched the MBA Japan program, the first Canadian degree program offered in Japan.

In 2005, the Faculty of Management was renamed to the Desautels Faculty of Management in honor of the late Marcel Desautels, an executive from the credit reference industry, who made several gifts of more than $32 million total to the faculty. The Desmarais Global Finance Research Centre, made possible by a donation from the Desmarais family, was also established. In 2007, Marcel Desautels received an honorary McGill doctorate in recognition of his outstanding contributions to business education. In July 2008, he was made a Member of the Order of Canada, one of the highest civilian honours bestowed by the Canadian government.

In January 2012 the second floor of the Bronfman building reopened as the new "Business Intelligence Centre," featuring a trading room sponsored by the Desjardins Group.

In 2015, the faculty launched the world's first GROOC, a type of massive open online course with an emphasis on groupwork, titled Social Learning for Social Impact on edX.

In May 2017, the faculty announced a $25 million donation from the Bensadoun Family Foundation for the development of the Bensadoun School of Retail Management: an interdisciplinary, state-of-the-art school dedicated to all facets of the retail industry.

In January 2017, it was announced that the new building for the MBA and master’s programs would be named in honour of Professor Don E. Armstrong, founder of the faculty’s MBA. The MBA and master’s programs officially moved into the building in January 2018. The 48,666 sq. ft. expansion brings new dedicated teaching and learning spaces that benefit all in the Faculty.

In response to the growing needs of organizations for business analytics, the Desautels Faculty of Management launched the Master of Management in Analytics (MMA) program in January 2018. The MMA degree is a pre-experience, twelve-month specialized program in the evolving field of management analytics.

== Undergraduate programs ==
The faculty's Bachelor of Commerce program currently offers 13 different majors, 16 different concentrations, 4 different honours (including 2 joint honours with the Economics department), and 3 different minors as part of the BCom degree; The BCom degree typically consists of 90 credits (for CEGEP students or students with sufficient advanced standing credits) or 120 credits (for all other students). All BCom students (except for certain major/honours programs) take a 36 credit Management Core curriculum in a variety of business disciplines. Undergraduate students may go on an exchange at over 70 different universities across the world and the Faculty offers an international summer program for visiting undergraduates from other universities. Undergraduate students in other faculties at McGill can elect to take classes or complete a minor within Desautels.

BCom students also have the opportunity to participate in the co-curricular Integrated Management Student Fellowship (IMSF), which is a two-semester, six-credit experiential leadership development program. As part of the program, Fellows apprentice with faculty professors to support their research, and work in teams with other Fellows to design and implement a real-world project aligned with one of the United Nations Sustainable Development Goals.

== Graduate programs ==
The faculty graduate-level business programs include the Master of Business Administration, Doctor of Philosophy in management degrees, and other programs. The faculty also offers joint programs with the faculties of Law and Medicine.

=== MBA ===
The Full-Time MBA is a two-year program. Students can concentrate in Finance, Marketing, Strategy & Innovation, Analytics, and choose over 50 electives courses. The 2011 class had an average age of 28, 5 years of experience and a GMAT score of 670. In 2010–2011, 21% of the graduating class was employed in consulting, 37% in finance, and the average total compensation was CAD$112,000

=== Other programs ===
- EMBA
- Graduate Certificate in Professional Accounting (GCPA Program)
- International Masters for Health Leadership (IMHL)
- International Masters Program for Managers (IMPM)
- Global Manufacturing and Supply Chain Management (GMSCM)
- Master of Management in Finance (MMF)
- Master of Management in Analytics (MMA)
- Master of Management in Retailing (MMR)
- PhD Program in Management

== Executive education ==
The McGill Executive Institute provides a variety of public business seminars as well as custom executive education and coaching for all levels of management. Founded in 1956, the Institute has a full-time staff of learning design and program managers working with professors at McGill's Faculties of Management, Law, Arts, Education and Medicine, external guest experts in specific fields, as well as visiting professors from universities worldwide. The Institute's clientele includes businesses, not-for-profit organizations and government/public sector services.

The McGill-HEC Montréal EMBA is offered in partnership with the Desautels Faculty of Management and HEC Montréal. The EMBA is offered in a bilingual format in both English and French and lasts approximately 15 months with a 10-day study abroad trip in Latin America or Asia. Successful graduates of the program are awarded a joint MBA degree bearing the seals of both McGill University and HEC Montréal.

== Research centres ==
The eight Integrated and Area-Specific Research Centres include:

- Business & Management Research Centre (BMRC)
- Centre for Strategy Studies in Organizations (CSSO)
- Desmarais Global Finance Research Centre (DGFRC)
- Management Science Research Centre (MSRC)
- Marcel Desautels Institute for Integrated Management (MDIIM)
- McGill Centre for the Convergence of Health and Economics
- McGill Dobson Centre for Entrepreneurship
- McGill Institute of Marketing (MIM)

== Admission ==
The historical cut-off for the BCom program (three-year average) is 94.7% overall across the “top 5” academic grade 12 classes (for students coming from high schools within Canada, outside of Quebec and Ontario), and 85.7% in the prerequisite English or French course, 88% in the prerequisite math course. Admissions requirements for the master’s programs vary.

== Student life ==
The Management Undergraduate Society (MUS) represents all full and part-time undergraduate students enrolled at the Desautels Faculty of Management. The MUS is student-led, with a Board of Directors elected by the student body in the fall and winter semesters. Members of the board of directors, whose positions include representatives for each year of study, preside over the appointed Executive Council. The Executive Council oversees the day-to-day operation facets of the Management Undergraduate Society's various portfolios. There are over 35 MUS committees and 11 MUS clubs that organize student activities every year. The MUS also offers six student services and academic representation to the faculty and the university. The Bull & Bear is Desautel's student-run campus news magazine operates on an unpaid basis by an editorial team of 12 members and a staff of approximately 75.

Desautels has been host to the McGill Management International Case Competition, an international business case competition, since 2001. Students from McGill and universities across the globe compete to solve a multi-disciplinary business case judged by a panel composed of 12 company representatives from a variety of fields. The competition is held over a duration of 5 days and traditionally comprises social, networking, tourism and educational activities. The faculty also fields students team to compete in various other national and global case competitions, such as Jeux du Commerce, Financial Open, Happening Marketing, and other university case competitions around the world.

The faculty is also host to several student-run consulting organizations. The McGill Not-For-Profit Consulting is a student run consulting initiative for nonprofit organizations. The program, in partnership with McKinsey & Company, matches McGill students with nonprofit organizations in the Montreal community to work on proposals to improve some aspect of their operations. Junior Enterprise Desautels, in partnership with The Boston Consulting Group and the first of its kind in North America, and Accent on the Community, in partnership with Accenture, are also similar programs at Desautels. The McGill Business Consulting Group (MBCG), founded in 1983, is an MBA student run independent consulting group.

Desautels Capital Management (DCM), founded in 2009, is Canada's first university-owned, incorporated, student-run registered investment firm. When it was launched, undergraduate and MBA students as part of the Honours in Investment Management (HIM) program managed over $4 million in its Global Equity and Fixed Income funds. Today, all students enrolled in the Faculty’s HIM and Master of Management in Finance (MMF) programs work for the company, collectively having the opportunity to manage four funds with a total of about $7.4 million in assets. DCM is one of the few student run investment firms in the world authorized to attract outside money from external investors.

The McGill Dobson Centre for Entrepreneurship hosts the annual McGill Dobson Cup. Teams composed of McGill students, faculty, alumnus, and the general population pitch their start-up ideas to seasoned experts for feedback, mentorship, and a chance to win up to $100,000 in start-up capital. The McGill Dobson Cup has attracted over 1000 innovators and helped create 97 start-ups and approximately 500 jobs. For the year 2019-2020, the McGill Dobson Centre for Entrepreneurship is ranked as one of the top 20 business incubators by the UBI Global World Rankings of Business Incubators and Accelerators.

== List of deans ==
From	To	Name
2021-08	present	Yolande E. Chan
2020-11	2021-07	Morty Yalovsky (Interim Dean)
2015-09	2020-10	Isabelle Bajeux-Besnainou
2014	2015	Morty Yalovsky (Interim Dean)
2005	2014	Peter Todd
2000	2005	Gerald Ross
1987	2000	Wallace Crowston
1986	1987	Morty Yalovsky (Interim Dean)
1979	1986	Laurent Picard
1973	1979	Stanley J. Shapiro
1970	1973	Howard Irwin Ross
1969	1969	Carl A. Winkler (Acting Dean)

== Rankings ==
McGill's Faculty of Management is consistently ranked within the top and elite business schools in the world, particularly regarding the diversity and internationalism of its attendees, and its international network of alumni in high positions. Out of the attendees, 3 out of 4 come from countries outside of Canada, a much higher ratio than other Canadian business schools.

Business school rankings

Global
- QS MBA: 50
- Financial Times MBA: 83

- Times Higher Education World University Business School Rankings: McGill Desautels Faculty of Management was ranked 64th Globally.
- QS World Business School Ranking 2022: McGill Desautels Faculty of Management was ranked 50th Globally.
- UTD Top 100 Worldwide - 2017-2021: McGill Desautels Faculty of Management was ranked 37th Globally (and 2nd in Canada) out of 100 elite global business schools.

=== Specialized rankings ===
- QS World University Global MBA Rankings 2022: The QS World University Rankings placed the McGill Master of Business Administration (MBA) 4th in Canada. Of the 286 programs considered for this prestigious ranking, the McGill Desaultels MBA ranks 74th worldwide, performing amongst the top 26% globally.
- Financial Times - Global MBA Ranking 2021: The Desautels MBA program is ranked 2nd in Canada and 90th in the world by the 2021 Financial Times Global MBA Ranking—one of only four Canadian schools who made the list.
- America Economia - MBA Global Ranking 2021: The McGill Desautels MBA ranked 1st in Canada and 20th globally in the 2021 America Economia Global MBA Ranking.
- QS Business Masters Rankings - Business Analytics 2022: The Master of Management in Analytics (MMA) program at McGill Desautels ranked 1st in Canada and 11th globally out of 120 programs, performing amongst the top 9% globally, securing a top 5 spot in North America.
- QS World University Rankings - Finance 2022: The QS World University Rankings places the McGill Master of Management in Finance (MMF) 2nd in Canada and 19th internationally out of 179 programs, performing amongst the top 11% globally, securing a top 5 spot in North America.
- Financial Times - Business school rankings 2021: The Desautels Master of Management in Finance (MMF) program is ranked 1st in North America and 36th globally in the 2021 Financial Times Global Masters in Finance Pre-Experience Ranking.
- Corporate Knights - 2021 Better World MBA: Corporate Knights continues to rank the Desautels MBA as one of the prestigious Top 40 globally in terms of sustainable development and corporate social responsibility through teaching, research and practice, according to the 2021 Better World MBA Ranking.
- Corporate Knights - 2021 Better World BCOM: The Desautels Faculty of Management’s BCom program has ranked 4th in Canada in Corporate Knights’ inaugural Better World BComs Top 10.

McGill University was named the number 1 university in North America for number of startups in 2024.

=== Canadian MBA Alliance ===
The school is also a founding member of the Canadian MBA Alliance which was created in 2013. All six members of the alliance rank among the world’s top 100 schools, according to their participation in key rankings – Financial Times, Business Week, and The Economist.

== Notable people ==
=== Current faculty members ===
- Henry Mintzberg – Cleghorn Professor of Management Studies
- Reuven Brenner – retired REPAP Professor of Economics
- Hamid Etemad – professor of international business and business guru and researcher
- Karl Moore - renowned professor in strategy and organization
- Nancy J. Adler – professor of organizational behavior and Samuel Bronfman Chair in Management

=== Notable alumni ===
- Mirko Bibic – CEO of BCE Inc. (Bell Canada Enterprises)
- John Cleghorn – former chair and CEO, RBC Royal Bank Financial Group
- Jean-Francois Courville – COO of RBC Wealth Management
- David Laidley – business executive, former chair of Deloitte LLP
- Edgar Bronfman, Sr. – chair of the Seagram Company
- Thomas S. Monahan – president and CEO of CIBC Mellon
- Malik Amin Aslam – Pakistani environmentalist and politician who served as Federal Minister of State for Environment from 2004-2007
- Seymour Schulich – billionaire founder of Franco-Nevada Mining Corporation and Chairman of Newmont Capital Limited
- Darren Entwistle – president and chief executive officer of Telus
- François-Jean Coutu – president and CEO of the Jean Coutu Group
- Morris Goodman – Founder and Owner of Pharmascience
- Paul Desmarais, Jr. – billionaire, chairman and co-chief executive officer of Power Corporation of Canada
- David A.B. Brown – president and CEO of the Layne Christensen Company
- Jennifer Heil – 2006 Winter Olympics gold medalist and 2010 Winter Olympics silver medalist in freestyle moguls
- William Shatner – actor, starred as James T. Kirk in Star Trek
- Alain Bellemare – president and CEO at Bombardier Inc.
- Max Bell – Canadian newspaper publisher, race horse owner and philanthropist
- Guy Hachey – former COO and President at Bombardier Aerospace
- Norman Jaskolka – president at the ALDO Group
- Pierre Jean Jeanniot – director general emeritus of the International Air Transport Association (IATA), former CEO of Air Canada
- Peter Todd – dean of HEC Paris
- Samira Sakhia – CEO Knight Therapeutics
- Herb Gray – Canadian lawyer, prominent federal politician
- Jonathan Ross Goodman – founder, executive chairman Knight Therapeutics and founder of Paladin Labs Inc.
- Ellis Jacob – president and CEO of Cineplex Entertainment
- Aldo Bensadoun – billionaire Founder and CEO of the ALDO Group
- Jeanne Atherden – Minister of Health of the Parliament of Bermuda
- Hashim Jawan Bakht – Pakistani politician who was the provincial minister of Punjab for finance 2018-2022
- Jacques Farcy – president and CEO, Québec Liquor Corporation SAQ, former CEO SQDC
- Claude Mongeau – CEO and president of the Canadian National Railway
- Thomas S. Monahan – president and CEO of CIBC Mellon
- Jeannine Bailliu – Canadian economist who is currently the associate vice-president (programs) at the C.D. Howe Institute
- Eric Molson – billionaire former chairman of Molson Coors and former chancellor of Concordia University
- Brian Francis O'Neill – National Hockey League executive and Hockey Hall of Fame member
- Michel Pettigrew – COO and president at Ferring Pharmaceuticals
- Dick Pound – former vice-president of the International Olympic Committee
- Nagi Kawkabani – co-CEO and partner at the European hedge fund Brevan Howard
- Sheila Fraser – former auditor general of Canada from 2001 to 2011
- John Peters Humphrey – author of the Universal Declaration on Human Rights
- Mark Hantho – vice chairman of Citigroup
- Fabienne Colas – Haitian-Canadian actress, director and producer
- Imran Amed – British-Canadian founder and editor-in-chief of the website The Business of Fashion
- Gad Saad – marketing professor at the John Molson School of Business at Concordia University
- Kenneth Farmer – Olympic gold medalist, Canadian ice hockey player and businessman, president of the Canadian Olympic Association
- Hubert Lacroix – president and CEO of the Canadian Broadcasting Corporation
- Kenneth Carter – accountant, known for his work as chair of the Royal Commission on Taxation conducted in the 1960s, known as the "Carter Commission"
- Michael Latifi – chairman and CEO of Sofina Foods Inc., owner of McLaren Group
- Andy Nulman – cofounder of Just for Laughs
- Fred Steer – CFO of the Montreal Canadiens
- Alfred Powis – former CEO and chairman of Noranda Mines
- Jean-Francois Manzoni – president (dean) and Nestlé Chaired Professor of International Institute for Management Development (IMD)
- Pierre Boivin – former president of the Montreal Canadiens, president and chief executive officer, Claridge Inc.
- Dick Irvin, Jr. – former sports broadcaster for the CBC
- Robert Dorrance – chairman, CEO, and president of TD Securities and group head of wholesale banking at the TD Bank Group
- H. Arnold Steinberg – businessman and former chancellor of McGill University
- Joanne Liu – international president of Médecins Sans Frontières (Doctors Without Borders)
- William Webb – chief investment officer at the wealth management firm Gluskin Sheff
- Harold Tafler Shapiro – former president of Princeton University and the University of Michigan
- Bertrand Cesvet – executive chairman and senior partner at Sid Lee
- Rima Qureshi – chief strategy officer and head of M&A at Ericsson
- Juliette Powell – American-Canadian media expert, tech ethicist, business advisor, author and beauty pageant titleholder
- Danny Miller – economist and strategy professor, fifth-most cited management researcher in the world
- Kuok Khoon Hong – Singaporean billionaire business magnate and cofounder of Wilmar International
- Donald Lewtas – CFO of the private equity investment firm Onex Corporation
- L. Denis Desautels – former auditor general of Canada from 1991 to 2001
- Susan DeVore – former CEO Premier, Inc.
- Robert Rabinovitch – former president and CEO of the Canadian Broadcasting Corporation
- Peter Lambrinakos – policing executive
- Tanya Taylor – Owner, Creative Director, Tanya Taylor Designs
- Kathleen Fox – Canadian parachutist, pilot, flight instructor, air traffic controller, and business executive
- Lev Binzumovich Leviev – Israeli-Russian entrepreneur and investor, founder of international venture capital firm LVL1, co-founder of Russia's largest social network VK.com
- Harriett Baldwin – British Conservative Party politician
- Laxmi Poruri – Indian-American professional tennis player
- Claude Taylor – president and CEO of Air Canada
- Scott McDonald – CEO of the management consulting firm Oliver Wyman
- Alberta Cefis – head of global transaction banking at Scotiabank
- Alan DeSousa – former chairman of the Montreal Executive Committee
- Zhao Tongtong – Chinese-Canadian billionaire co-founder of Huazhu Hotels Group
- Todd Squarek - chief commercial officer, North America Beverages at PepsiCo
- Monique Leroux – president and CEO of Desjardins Group
- André Gremillet – president and CEO of the Cleveland Orchestra
- Mathieu Darche – general manager for the New York Islanders of the National Hockey League (NHL)
- David Segal – founder of DavidsTea and Firebelly Tea
- Eric Boyko – founder, president and CEO of Stingray Group
- André Roy – managing partner at the law firm Stikeman Elliott
- Nathalie Bernier – former managing partner at KPMG
- Paul Brotto – former president and CEO at Canadian Airlines
- Eric Lachance – president and CEO at Énergir
- Thierry Zomahoun – Benin-Canadian political economist

== See also ==
- List of business schools in Canada
- McGill Executive Institute
