= Deepa M. Ollapally =

Indian academic

Deepa M. Ollapally is research professor of international affairs and the associate director of the Sigur Center for Asian Studies at the Elliott School of International Affairs, George Washington University. She is also the director of the Rising Powers Initiative launched by the Elliott School in 2009.

== Academic career ==
Ollapally holds a Ph.D. in Political Science from Columbia University. Ollapally joined George Washington University in 2003. She directed the South Asia program at the U.S. Institute of Peace from 1998-2003, and taught at Swarthmore College from 1990-97. From 1996-98, Ollapally served as fellow of the Strategic Studies Unit at the National Institute of Advanced Studies in Bangalore, India.

Her research has focused on security and politics in Asia, particularly nuclear nonproliferation, extremism, gender, and identity politics in the region. Her current research focuses on domestic foreign policy debates in India and their implications for regional security and global leadership of the United States. She is an advisory council member for Women in Security, Conflict Management and Peace, New Delhi, and served on the board of directors for Women in International Security, Washington D.C. She is a familiar face in discussions and debates on foreign policy in India and abroad.

== Selected publications ==
- (co-ed. with Henry R. Nau) Worldviews of Aspiring Powers: Domestic Foreign Policy Debates in China, India, Iran, Japan, and Russia (Oxford University Press, 2012). Review by G. John Ikenberry, Foreign Affairs, January/February 2013ISBN 0199985995
- The Politics of Extremism in South Asia (Cambridge University Press, 2008) ISBN 0521875846

== Personal life ==
Ollapally is married to G. "Anand" Anandalingam, dean of the Imperial College Business School at Imperial College London, and is the mother of two children and owner of a beagle mix dog named Dash.
