= Landbay =

UK financial technology company

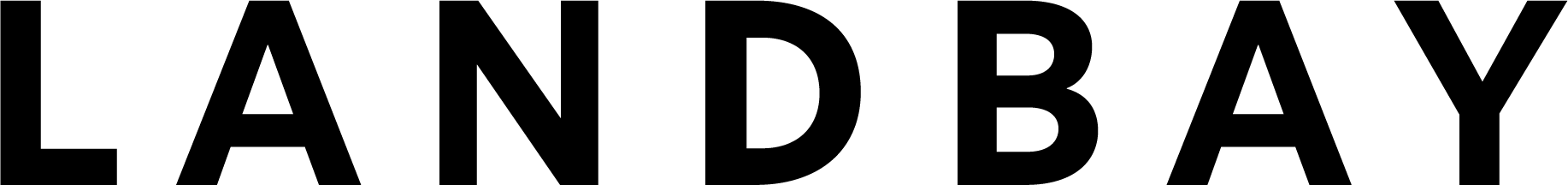
- Type: Private
- Industry: BTL Mortgage Lending Platform
- Founded: 29 August 2013
- Headquarters: London, England
- Key people: John Goodall, Julian Cork, Paul Clampin
- Products: Residential buy-to-let mortgages
- Services: Financial services
- Revenue: 16,869,260 euro (2021)
- Number of employees: 125 (2021)
- Website: landbay.co.uk

Landbay is a UK Financial technology company that operates a mortgage lending platform to allow institutions to fund residential mortgages in a ‘Mortgage-as-a-Service’ construct.

== Company overview ==
Landbay was originally launched in 2014 as an online peer-to-peer lending platform enabling investors to invest in the United Kingdom's buy-to-let mortgage market. The business model matches investors' funds to buy-to-let mortgages, thus all loans are secured by residential real estate. When the company launched, both Landbay worked with both individual and institutional lenders, however in 2019 Landbay stopped allowing individual investors to use its services and has since been institutionally funded only.

As of November 2021 Landbay had completed over £1B of mortgages and continues to invest in the mortgage funding, technology, underwriting and operational capacity to grow significantly in this £250bn market. Landbay has a broad funding base with Retail Banks, Investment Banks and Asset Managers resulting in strong diversification with loans funded via securitisation capital markets and via bank deposits. Landbay has whole of market intermediary coverage with the major broker networks & clubs partnering with them.

Landbay has also won multiple awards including Best BTL Lender for the last 4 years running at the Mortgage Introducer Awards. Landbay has also been named in the Deloitte Technology Fast 50 for the last 3 years are in the Technation's Future Fifty 2020 cohort and in 2021 Landbay was listed as Europe's 11th fastest growing company in the FT1000 annual report

Landbay is a signatory to Techniation's Tech Zero initiative.

In January 2022 Landbay achieved certification becoming Carbon Neutral having measured scope 1,2 & 3 emissions and offset the resultant CO2E via the Climate Fund™ Portfolio of certified carbon reduction projects around the world.

The company was founded by John Goodall and Gray Stern, who appointed a specialist product development studio Innovify, founded by Maulik Sailor, whom John met whilst pursuing his MBA programme from Imperial College Business School, to develop their initial product.

Landbay is regulated by the FCA Financial Conduct Authority.
