= Thomas S. Monahan =

- Occupations: President and CEO
- Employer: CIBC Mellon
- Known for: President and CEO, CIBC Mellon 2009-Present
- Spouse: Sandra Monahan
- Children: Neil Monahan, Sarah Monahan, Joseph Monahan
- Parent(s): Henry Stephen Monahan, Elizabeth Helen Monahan

Thomas S. Monahan is the president and CEO of CIBC Mellon (as of November 2, 2009) succeeding Thomas C. MacMillan. Mr. Monahan was born in Arvida, Quebec (now Saguenay, Quebec), and is a native of Montreal, Quebec and has a bachelor of commerce degree from the McGill University Desautels Faculty of Management, and a degree from Vanier College.

Prior to joining CIBC Mellon, Mr. Monahan was National Sales Manager for CIBC Wood Gundy and Managing Director of CIBC World Markets from 1995 to 1999. From 1999 Mr. Monahan served as Head of CIBC Wood Gundy. He was named Chair and Chief Executive Officer of CIBC Investor Services in October 2002. He has also worked at the Montreal Stock Exchange and Merrill Lynch Canada.
