= Valletti =

Valletti is an Italian surname. Notable people with the surname include:

- Aldo Valletti (1930–1992), Italian film actor
- Cesare Valletti (1922–2000), Italian operatic tenor
- Tommaso Valletti, Italian economist

== See also ==
- Valetti
