= Valetti =

Valetti is a surname. Notable people with the surname include:

- Giovanni Valetti (1913–1998), Italian cyclist
- Rosa Valetti (1878–1937), German actress, cabaret performer, and singer

== See also ==
- 79375 Valetti, main-belt asteroid
- Valletti
