= McGill Executive Institute =

University unit in Montreal,Canada

- Type: For Profit
- Industry: Executive Education
- Founded: Montreal, Quebec, Canada (1956)
- Headquarters: Montreal, Quebec, Canada
- Area served: Worldwide
- Key people: Professor Louis Gialloreto, Executive Director
- Products: Management Seminars, Custom Business Services
- Owner: McGill University
- Parent: Desautels Faculty of Management
- Website: www.executive.mcgill.ca

The McGill Executive Institute is the corporate education and management development unit of the McGill University Desautels Faculty of Management in Montreal, Quebec, Canada. It provides a variety of public business seminars as well as custom executive education and coaching for all levels of management.

Founded in 1956, the Institute has a full-time staff of learning design and program managers working with professors at McGill’s Faculties of Management, Law, Arts, Education and Medicine, external guest experts in specific fields, as well as visiting professors from universities worldwide. The Institute’s clientele includes businesses, not-for-profit organizations and government/public sector services.

== History ==
After establishing the first management diploma in 1906, McGill University began offering evening classes in business education in 1912. Following Canada's post World War II expansion, McGill University responded to the needs of senior executives by offering seminars in personnel management, marketing, and finance.

Concurrent to business seminars offered by McGill, the Executive Development Institute, a private business education organization, began to offer the Executive Development Course (EDC) in 1949, in affiliation with the Montreal Board of Trade. It was developed with support from the Graduate School of Business at Harvard University. A precursor to the existence of many MBA and later EMBA programs, the EDC was designed to provide a comprehensive look at management practices in strategy, human resources, marketing, negotiations and financial acumen.

In 1956, the McGill Management Institute was founded to facilitate the more effective delivery of business seminars offered at McGill University. In 1973, the Executive Development Institute merged with the McGill Management Institute and, under the McGill banner, continued the facilitation of the EDC. The merger coincided with a move to its current home in the Bronfman building at McGill University on Sherbrooke Street in Montreal, where it underwent a significant expansion of its offerings. By 1984, the McGill Management Institute was offering 70 day-time seminars and 20 evening courses each year, in addition to the EDC.

In 1993, the McGill Management Institute was renamed the McGill International Executive Institute. It took its current name, the McGill Executive Institute, in 2002. It is a division of the Desautels Faculty of Management.

== Philosophy ==
The McGill Executive Institute has been noted for its approach to action-based learning, as well as for its international dimension. In his 2009 work, Executive Education in Canadian Firms, Bruce Gordon R. Fowler states the following:

The executive programs at this Institute recognize better than most schools, even among the other eight illustrious institutions discussed here, the need for international diversity and content. Indeed, McGill has been recognized as having an international dimension unsurpassed in North America for diversity among students and faculty, and for program style and content. The scope of McGill's global outlook is certainly equal to that of Harvard and INSEAD, also featured here as giants of international connectivity, which simply must be part of any program involving executives of international or multinational firms.

== Products and services ==
Each year, the McGill Executive Institute provides approximately 20 to 40 open enrolment seminars addressing a number of business topics. The Institute’s longest running program is the Executive Development Course which was launched in 1949. The EDC has been expanded over the years, and is currently offered in three successive modules: the Executive Development Course, the Advanced Management Course, and Integrated Management Thinking. Together, these are referred to by the Institute as the Mini-MBA Series.

The McGill Executive Institute also designs and delivers customized learning specifically for an organization’s team of managers or executives. Services range from short workshops delivered in English, French or bilingual formats to global initiatives with delivery of modules to participants across management levels over several years.

The McGill Executive Institute also offers an International Masters in Practicing Management (IMPM), as well as the Advanced Leadership Program (ALP). These longer, global programs occur over several modules and across multiple international locations, in conjunction with other universities: The Indian Institute of Management in Bangalore, India; Lancaster University in the UK; Korea Development Institute School of Public Policy and Management in Seoul, Korea; and INSEAD in France. Both the ALP and the IMPM were co-founded and are co-directed by Professor Henry Mintzberg.

== Faculty and guest speakers ==
Well-known McGill faculty members include Professor Henry Mintzberg on advanced leadership issues and Professor Nancy Adler on organizational behavior. Recent guest speakers of note have included business leaders Daniel Lamarre, Larry Smith, Jim Cherry, Alan Allnutt, Paul Côté and Pierre Boivin.

== Partners ==
The McGill Executive Institute partners with the Institute of Corporate Directors (ICD) in Canada to deliver the Director’s Education Program. It is also a registered education provider with the Project Management Institute (PMI) and collaborates with the Canadian Corporate Counsel Association to deliver development programs for lawyers on financial literacy.
