= Francisco Veloso =

Portuguese academic

- Born: 1969 (age 56–57); Lisbon, Portugal
- Education: University of Lisbon; Massachusetts Institute of Technology
- Occupation: Academic

Francisco Veloso (born 1969) is a Portuguese academic who has served as dean of INSEAD since September 2023. Previously, he was dean of the Imperial College Business School from 2017 to 2023.

== Early life and education ==
Francisco Veloso was born in 1969 in Lisbon, Portugal. He graduated from the University of Lisbon, where he earned a bachelor's degree and a master's degree. In 2001, he earned a PhD from the Massachusetts Institute of Technology.

== Career ==
Veloso began his career as an assistant professor at Carnegie Mellon University in 2002, where he became a full professor in 2011. He was a professor at the Católica Lisbon School of Business & Economics in 2011, and he was the dean from 2012 to August 2017, when he became the dean of the Imperial College Business School.

On 4 September 2023, INSEAD appointed Veloso as its new Dean.
