= Danny Miller (economist) =

Canadian organization theorist

Danny Miller (born 1947) is a Canadian economist and Strategy Professor (Rogers-J.A.-Bombardier Chair of Entrepreneurship) at HEC Montréal. He also teaches at the Chair in Family Enterprise and Strategy at the University of Alberta. According to a statement by HEC, Miller is the fifth-most cited management researcher in the world.

Besides teaching, Miller works as a strategy consultant for companies. According to his resume, these companies include McKinsey & Company, Andersen Consulting (now Accenture), Citicorp, DMR Inc. (Data Migration Resources), Goldman Sachs and others.

== Education ==
After completing a Master of Business Administration in Toronto, Miller received a doctorate in Management Policy from McGill University (Montreal), supervised by Henry Mintzberg.

== Honours and awards ==
- 2001: Best Paper Award, Journal of Management
- 2007: Best Family Business Paper Award (together with Isabelle Le Breton-Miller, University of Alberta, and Richard H. Lester, Texas A&M University) for the article Divided Loyalties: Governance, Conduct and Performance in Family and Entrepreneur Businesses

== Bibliography ==
- 1984 Organizations: a quantum view with Peter H. Friesen and Henry Mintzberg; Englewood Cliffs, N.J.: Prentice-Hall, ISBN 0136419852
- 1989 Unstable at the Top with Manfred F. R. Kets de Vries
- 1990 The Icarus paradox: how exceptional companies bring about their own downfall: new lessons in the dynamics of corporate success, decline, and renewal; New York, Harper Business, ISBN 0887304532;
- 2005 Managing for the long run: lessons in competitive advantage from great family businesses with Isabelle Le Breton-Miller; Boston, Mass., Harvard Business School Press, ISBN 1591394155
- 2007 Why do some family businesses out-compete? Governance, long-term orientations, and sustainable capability with Isabelle Le Breton-Miller
- 2009 Agency vs. stewardship in public family firms: a social embeddedness reconciliation with Isabelle Le Breton-Miller
