= Dorothy Griffiths =

British academic and sociologist

- Born: Dorothy Seymour Griffiths; 26 May 1947 (age 79)
- Education: University of London; University of Bath
- Employer: Imperial College London
- Known for: Gender equality
- Awards: Order of the British Empire

Dorothy Seymour "Dot" Griffiths, OBE, FRSA (born 26 May 1947) is a British academic and sociologist. She championed gender equality at Imperial College London, where she was a lecturer in sociology from 1969. She was Professor of Human Resource Management from 2002 to 2017.

== Early life and education ==
Griffiths was born on 26 May 1947 in London, England. She received a Bachelor of Science (BSc) degree in sociology from the University of London in 1968, and a Master of Science (MSc) degree in Sociology of science and technology from the University of Bath.

== Career ==
In 1969 Griffiths joined Imperial College London. At Imperial she held many roles, including Dean of Imperial College Business School and Provost's Envoy for Gender Equality. She chaired the Academic Opportunities Committee and was Deputy Chair of the Graduate School of Engineering and Physical Sciences.

She acted as a consultant in Human Resource Management for major international organisations, including BP. Griffiths published extensively on management and organisational research. She was a founding editor of Feminist Review and Chair of the Feminist Review Trust. For several years, Griffiths was the coordinator of Imperial College's institutional Athena SWAN applications, creating a more supportive College community that benefitted all staff.

Griffiths campaigned for gender equality at Imperial, believing if the environment was better for women it would better for everyone. She was concerned that women hesitated before applying for prestigious research fellowships and chairs.

In 2004 she was elected a Fellow of the City and Guilds of London Institute. She was awarded an Order of the British Empire for services to Higher Education in 2010. She was made a Fellow of the Royal Society of Arts in 2010. She helped to create the annual Women@Imperial and Diverse@Imperial weeks. Griffiths became non-executive director at the Central and North West London NHS Foundation Trust in 2000. In 2014 she became Chair of Central North West London NHS Foundation Trust. She was Chair of Governors at Salusbury Primary School and a Governor at Queen's Park Community School. She helped to establish the Science Toy Award at the Imperial Festival. She lists her recreations in Who's Who as 'work, cats, tennis when knees permit, watching sport, house in Cyprus, progressive politics.'
