= Karl Moore (academic) =

Canadian academic and columnist

Academic background
- Education: Ambassador University, University of Southern California, York University

Academic work
- Institutions: McGill University

Karl Moore is an associate professor at McGill University, Montreal, Quebec, Canada. He holds a joint appointment in the Department of Strategy and Organization at the Desautels Faculty of Management and the Department of Neurology and Neurosurgery at McGill's Faculty of Medicine, however, he is not a medical professional, he does leadership teaching and coaching. Moore was previously on the faculty of Templeton College at Oxford University for five years, where he remains an Associate Fellow. He was the first strategy teacher on the MBA at the Said Business School. Before joining academia, he worked 12 years in sales and marketing management positions with IBM, Bull and Hitachi. Other schools he has taught at on MBA or executive programs include: Harvard Business School, Stanford, Duke, USC, Oxford, Cambridge, LBS, INSEAD, IMD, Skolkovo, Renmin, IIM Bangalore, NUS, and Keio University.

In 2005, Business Strategy Review, published by the London Business School, identified Moore among a group of the world's greatest business thinkers. A 2011 article in The Globe and Mail listed him as one of the four top business professors in Canada.

Moore's most recent research projects are on introverted/ambiverted/extroverted leaders in the C-Suite; it was discussed in The Economist's Schumpeter column in 2016 and in the Financial Times Management column in 2019. He has written a number of articles on the idea in Changeboard, the Globe and Mail. In March 2011 he started a weekly column for Forbes.com, Rethinking Leadership. Moore also hosts his own hour-long one on one weekly radio show with CEOs and other leaders, The CEO Series, which airs on Bell Media stations across Canada, including CFRB in Toronto, CJAD in Montreal, CFRA in Ottawa, etc.. He has interviewed Justin Trudeau, Muhammad Yunus, Sir Richard Branson, and countless others. These interviews also appear in a weekly column in The National Post and is translated intro French for Les Affaires.

In June 2002 Moore received the Faculty Teaching Award for MBA Teaching. In May 2012, Moore received the 2012 Faculty Award for Excellence in Alumni Activities. In August 2017, he was nominated for one of Thinkers50's Distinguished Achievement Awards. In 2019 he received McGill's, The Principal’s Prize for Public Engagement Through Media.

In November 2020 Moore with Wahiakatste Diome-Deer, an Indigenous Graduate student in Education at McGill, started a bi-weekly column for the Globe and Mail, Indigenous Leaders. His research on introverts/ambiverts/extroverts in the C Suite was published in an article, We Are All Ambiverts Now, in Duke University's Dialogue was discussed in the Bartleby column in the Economist in March 2021 and BBC Worklife.

In May 2023 his latest book Generation Why: How Boomers Can Lead and Learn from Millenials and GenZ came out from the McGill-Queens University Press, it was reviewed in Policy Magazine.
