= Bernard Ramanantsoa =

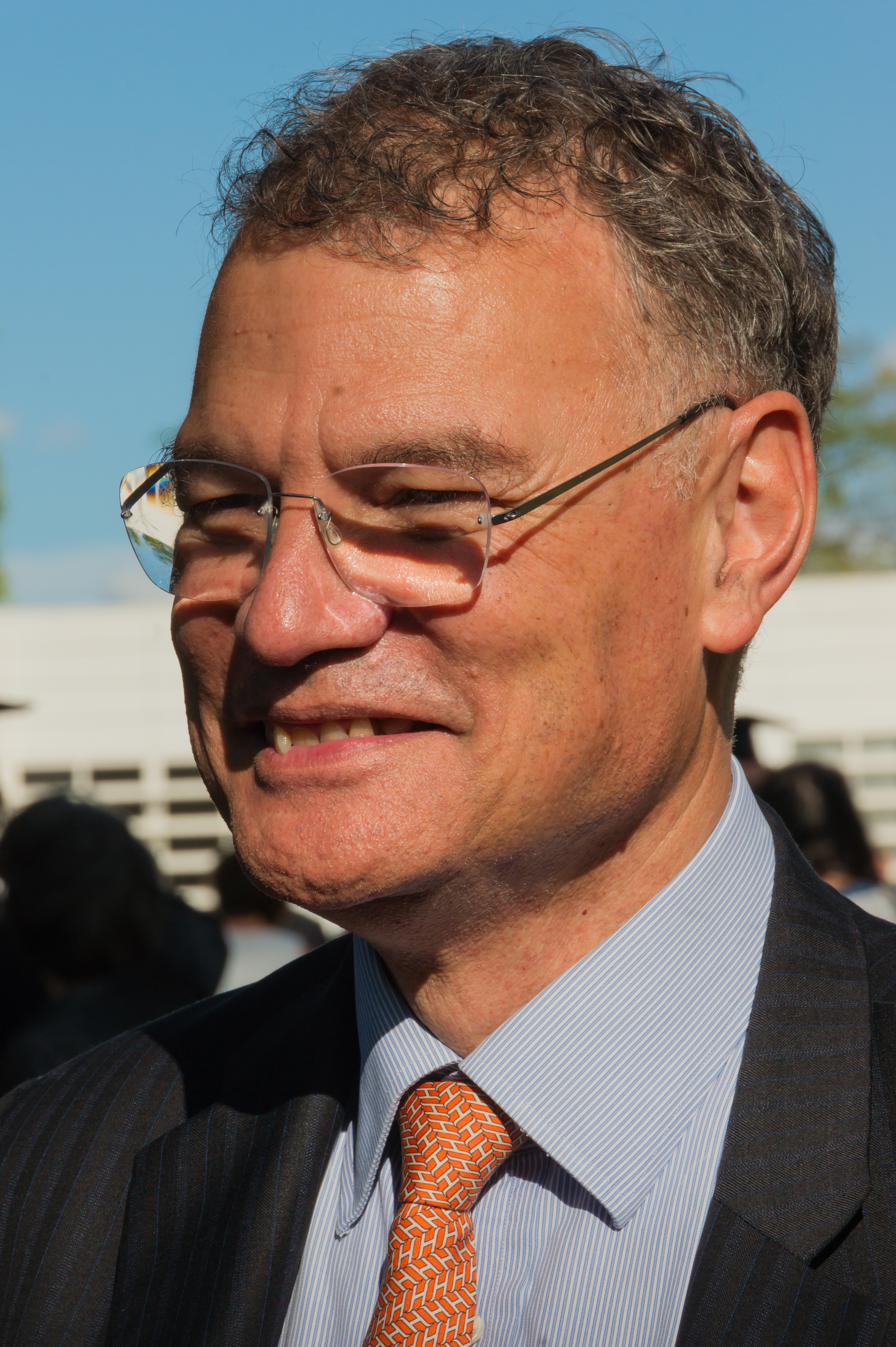
- Bernard Ramanantsoa, June 12, 2015

Director of HEC Paris
- In office 1996–2015
- Succeeded by: Peter Todd

Personal details
- Born: 26 November 1948 (age 77) Mulhouse, France
- Education: Supaéro; HEC Paris (MBA)

Bernard Ramanantsoa (born 26 November 1948) was the Dean of HEC Paris between 1996 and 2015.

Ramanantsoa is the nephew of Gabriel Ramanantsoa, former President of Madagascar. He and his two children are HEC Paris alumni.

He left his position in 2015.

== Other activities ==
=== Corporate boards ===
- Orange S.A., Independent Member of the Board of Directors (since 2020)

=== Non-profit organizations ===
- Bilderberg Group, Member
- EuropaNova, Member of the Board of Directors
