= Thomas C. MacMillan =

Thomas Carey MacMillan
- Born: June 21, 1948 (age 77); Toronto, Ontario, Canada
- Education: University of Toronto Schools; Princeton University; London School of Economics
- Known for: 2009 and Chairman 2009-2011 CIBC Mellon
- Parent(s): Dr Robert MacMillan and Eluned Carey Evans
- Relatives: Margaret MacMillan; Ann MacMillan

Thomas Carey MacMillan (born 21 June 1948) was the longest serving president and CEO of CIBC Mellon, and a Canadian businessman.

== Family ==
Thomas MacMillan was born to Dr Robert MacMillan and Eluned Carey Evans in Toronto. His maternal grandmother, Olwen Elizabeth Lloyd George, was a daughter of David Lloyd George, British Prime Minister between 1916 and 1922, with his first wife Margaret Owen. He is the third of five children, and the eldest son.

His eldest sister, Margaret Olwen MacMillan, is the Warden of St. Antony's College, Oxford. His elder sister, Ann MacMillan, is Manager of the London Bureau of the CBC.

== Career ==
Thomas MacMillan became president and CEO of CIBC Mellon in 1998, prior to assuming this role he was chairman, President and CEO of Mellon Bank Canada. He also held positions of responsibility at Montreal Trust where he served as Executive Vice-president of Corporate Services, and at Chase Manhattan Bank of Canada where he held the positions of vice-president, Corporate Banking and subsequently President and CEO.

On October 15, 2009, CIBC Mellon announced that Thomas S. Monahan would be succeeding MacMillan as president and CEO, and that MacMillan would become chairman. Following his appointment as Chairman of CIBC Mellon MacMillan was also appointed Canadian Regional Director for BNY Mellon. In February 2012, MacMillan became the Chairman of Blair Franklin Asset Management.

Business positions
Preceded by Douglas Nowers	President and CEO, CIBC Mellon; 1998-2009	Succeeded by Thomas S. Monahan
Preceded by Richard E. Venn	Chairman, CIBC Mellon; 2009-2011	Succeeded by Vincent V. Sands
Preceded by Various	Chairman, Blair Franklin Asset Management; 2012-Present	Incumbent

=== Directorships ===
Thomas MacMillan serves on, or has served on, the following Boards of Directors:

- Branksome Hall School
- Canadian Capital Markets Association
- Canada Colors and Chemicals Ltd.
- The Corporation of Massey Hall & Roy Thomson Hall
- Tafelmusik Baroque Orchestra
- The Guarantee Company of North America
- Fairwater Capital Corporation
- North Toronto Hockey Association
- Ontario Centre for Environmental Technical Advancement
- Sonor Investments Limited
- Toronto Symphony Orchestra
- University Health Network

== Education ==
After graduating from the University of Toronto Schools, Thomas MacMillan received his bachelor's degree from Princeton University and a master's degree from the London School of Economics and Political Science (LSE).

== See also ==
- CIBC Mellon
