= Carol Propper =

British economist

Dame Carol Propper DBE FBA is Professor of Economics at Imperial College Business School, Professor of Economics of Public Policy at Bristol University, and Professor of Health Economics at Monash University. She is also a senior research associate with the Nuffield Trust, and has served on the Economic and Social Research Council Research Grants Board.

She is the current President of the Royal Economic Society and a member of French President Macron's expert commission on major economic challenges. She also serves as a member of the Council for Science and Technology. Her work focuses on economic factors in health care reform, and she has served as an economic advisor to the National Health Service (England).

Propper was awarded her PhD from the University of York in 1988 with a thesis titled 'The demand for and use of private health insurance in the UK and the costs of NHS waiting lists.'

== Honours ==
Propper was appointed Commander of the Order of the British Empire (CBE) in 2010 for her services to social science and Dame Commander of the Order of the British Empire (DBE) in the 2021 New Year Honours for services to economic policy and public health.

In 2014, she was elected a Fellow of the British Academy (FBA), the United Kingdom's national academy for the humanities and social sciences. She was also elected as an international fellow of the National Academy of Medicine in 2018.

== Awards ==
- International Health Economics Association Arrow Award, 2010
- American Economic Association Prize, 2016
- International Health Economics Association Arrow Award, 2017

== Membership and associations ==
Propper was the Associate Dean for Faculty and Research at Imperial College Business School from 2016 to 2019, co-director and Director of the Centre for Market and Public Organisation at Bristol University from 1998 to 2009, co-director of the Centre for the Analysis of Social Exclusion at the London School of Economics from 1997 to 2007, and Deputy Editor of VOX EU beginning in 2016. She was a member of the Economic and Social Research Council (ESRC) from 2005 to 2009 and was a member of the Royal Economic Society council from 2000 to 2005.

== Works ==
Journal Articles

- Barrenho E, Miraldo M, Propper C, Walsh Bet al., (2021). "The importance of surgeons and their peers in adoption and diffusion of innovation: an observational study of laparoscopic colectomy adoption and diffusion in England." Social Science and Medicine. 272 doi:10.1016/j.socscimed.2021.113715.
- Banks J, Karjalainen H, Propper C, (2020). "Recessions and health: the long-term health consequences of responses to the coronavirus." Fiscal Studies. 41:337-344. doi:10.1111/1475-5890.12230.
- Burgess S, Propper C, Tominey E, (2017). "Incentives in the public sector: evidence from a government agency." Economic Journal. 127(605): F117-F141. doi:10.1111/ecoj.12422.
- Jones D, Propper C, Smith S, (2017). "Wolves in sheep's clothing: Is non-profit status used to signal quality?" Journal of Health Economics. 55:108-120. doi:10.1016/j.jhealeco.2017.06.011.
- Gaynor M, Propper C, Seiler S, (2016). "Free to Choose? Reform, Choice, and Consideration Sets in the English National Health Service." American Economic Review. 106(11):3521-3557. doi:10.1257/aer.20121532.
- Santos R, Gravelle H, Propper C (2016). "Does quality affect patients’ choice of Doctor? Evidence from England." Economic Journal. 127(600):445-494. doi:10.1111/ecoj.12282.
- Britton J, Propper C, (2016). "Teacher pay and school productivity: Exploiting wage regulation." Journal of Public Economics. 133:75-89. doi:10.1016/j.jpubeco.2015.12.004.
- Bloom N, Propper C, Seiler S, et al., (2015). "The Impact of Competition on Management Quality: Evidence from Public Hospitals." Review of Economic Studies. 82(2):457-489. doi:10.1093/restud/rdu045.
- McCormack J, Propper C, Smith S, (2014). "Herding Cats? Management and University Performance." Economic Journal. 124 (578):F534-F564. doi:10.1111/ecoj.12105.
- Gaynor M, Moreno-Serra R, Propper C, (2013). "Death by Market Power: Reform, Competition, and Patient Outcomes in the National Health Service." American Economic Journal-Economic Policy 5:134-166. doi:10.1257/pol.5.4.134.
- Propper C, Van Reenen J, (2010). "Can Pay Regulation Kill? Panel Data Evidence on the Effect of Labor Markets on Hospital Performance." Journal of Political Economy. 118:222-273. doi:10.1086/653137.
