= Peter Todd =

Canadian professor and academic administrator

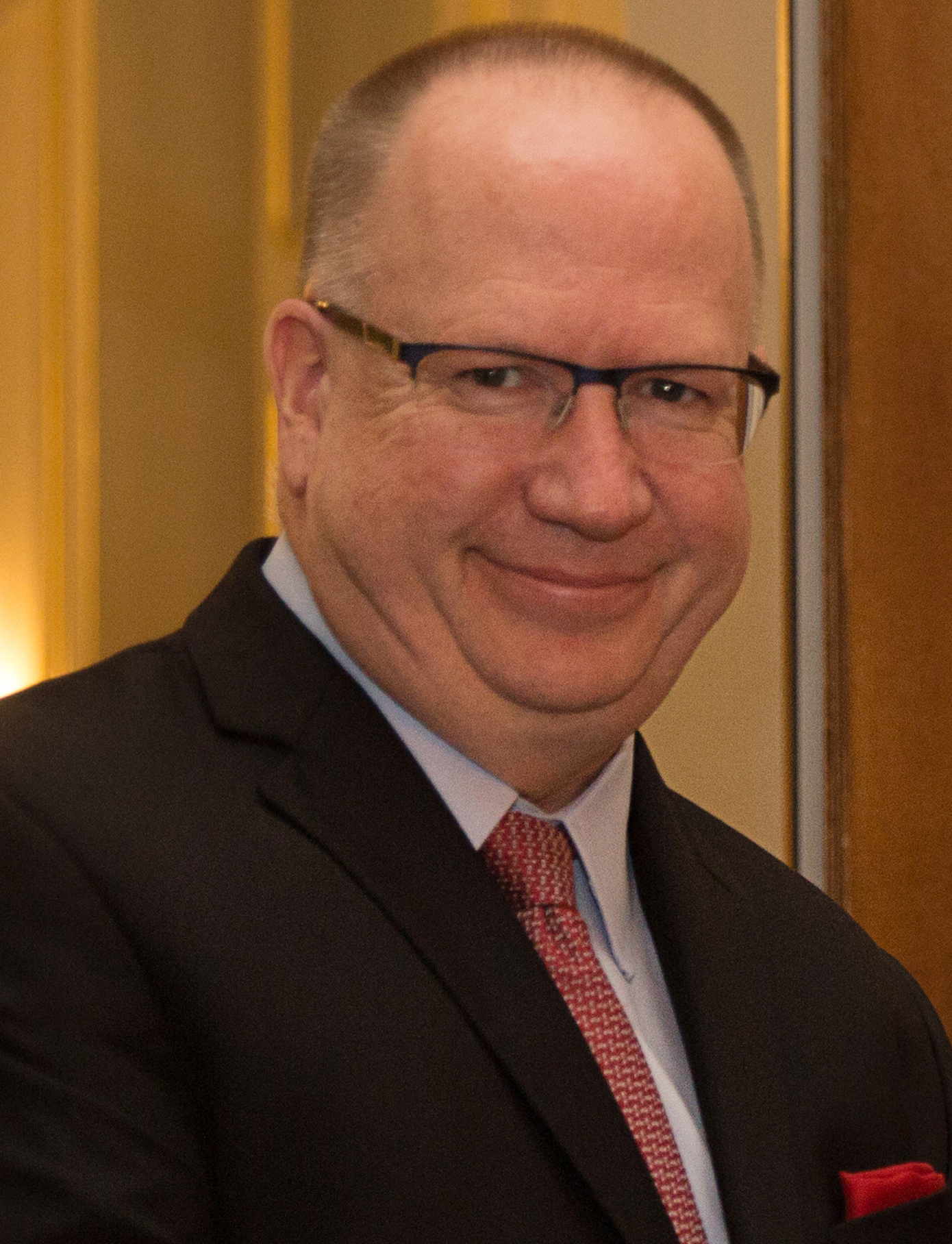

Dean of the Imperial Business School, Imperial College
- Incumbent
- Assumed office September 2024
- Preceded by: Francisco Veloso

Personal details
- Born: 1962 (age 63–64) Burnaby, British Columbia, Canada
- Education: McGill University; UBC Sauder School of Business

Peter Todd (born 1962) is a Canadian professor and academic administrator. He has served as the Dean of the Imperial Business School at Imperial College, London since September 2024. From July 2015 to October 2020, he served as the director of HEC Paris, and was the dean of McGill University's Desautels Faculty of Management from 2005 to 2014.

== Early life and education ==
Peter Todd was born in 1962 in Canada. He graduated from McGill University, where he earned a bachelor's degree in commerce, finance and information systems. He subsequently earned a PhD in business administration from the Sauder School of Business at the University of British Columbia.

== Career ==
Todd was a professor of business administration at Queen's University from 1989 to 1997. He was a professor and associate dean at the University of Houston's Bauer College of Business from 1997 to 2001, and associate dean of graduate programs at the University of Virginia's McIntire School of Commerce from 2002 to 2005. He returned to his alma mater, McGill University, in 2005, where he served as the dean of its Desautels Faculty of Management until 2014. During his tenure, he led a $75 million fundraising campaign.

Todd succeeded Bernard Ramanantsoa as the dean of HEC Paris in July 2015. Under his leadership, he expanded the partnership with the University of Paris-Saclay. After being diagnosed with a brain tumor, Todd announced in October of 2020 that he would step down from his job to focus more fully on a recovery.

Todd became Dean of the Imperial Business School at Imperial College, London in September 2024.

== Personal life ==
Todd is married, and he has no children.
