= Hamid Etemad =

Canadian academic

Hamid Etemad حمید اعتماد

Academic background
- Education: University of Tehran, University of California, Berkeley

Hamid Etemad (born 1945) is a Canadian organizational theorist, and Professor at the Desautels Faculty of Management, McGill University. He is best known for his work on international entrepreneurship and business, specifically the "internationalization of small and medium‐sized enterprises."

== Biography ==
Etemad received a M.Eng. degree from the University of Tehran as well as MBA, MSc and PhD degrees from the University of California, Berkeley.

Prior to joining McGill in 1978, he was a faculty member at Boston University and at University of California at Berkeley and San Francisco.

He is a professor at McGill University. Recognized for his approach-ability and insightful perspective on international marketing and international Entrepreneurship. In 2007, Etemad received the Decade of Stewardship of International Entrepreneurship Award at UCLA's Anderson Faculty of Management and awarded Fellowship of the International Entrepreneurship Scholar Network in 2008 at the University of Otago, New Zealand.

He is the Editors-in-Chief of Journal of International Entrepreneurship (JIEN) Published by Springer and Senior Series Editor of McGill International Entrepreneurship Series of Books published by Edward Elgar Publishing.

== Work ==
Etemad's research interests focused on the internationalization of small and medium size enterprises (SMEs). He is a founder and organizer of the McGill International Entrepreneurship Conference as well as the editor-in-chief of the Journal of International Entrepreneurship.

In addition, Etemad has guest-edited 13 scholarly journal issues, including the Canadian Journal of Administrative Sciences, Management International Review, Small Business Economics, Journal of International Management, Journal of International Marketing and "Journal of International Entrepreneurship", among others. He is also an active member of numerous editorial boards, including the Journal of Small Business and Enterprise Development, the International Journal of Entrepreneurship and Innovation Management.

== Selected publications ==
Etemad's publications include over 100 articles and 8 book volumes. Books, a selection:

- Etemad, Hamid, and Louise Séguin Dulude, eds. Managing the Multinational Subsidiary: Response to Environmental Changes and the Host Nation R. & D. Policies. Routledge, 1986.
- Etemad, Hamid, Stefano Denicolai, Birgit Hagen and Antonella Zucchella, eds. The Changing Global Economy and its Impact on International Entrepreneurship. Edward Elgar Publishing, 2016.

Articles, a selection:

- Etemad, Hamid, Richard W. Wright, and Leo Paul Dana. "Symbiotic international business networks: collaboration between small and large firms." Thunderbird International Business Review 43.4 (2001): 481-499.
- Etemad, Hamid, and Richard W. Wright. "Internationalization of SMEs: toward a new paradigm." Small Business Economics 20.1 (2003): 1-4.
- Etemad, Hamid. "Internationalization of Small and Medium‐sized Enterprises: A Grounded Theoretical Framework and an Overview." Canadian Journal of Administrative Sciences/Revue Canadienne des Sciences de l'Administration 21.1 (2004): 1-21.
