= Isabelle Bajeux-Besnainou =

French professor and administrator

- Education: École Normale Supérieure, Paris Dauphine University
- Occupations: Dean and Professor of Finance, Tepper School of Business at Carnegie Mellon University

Isabelle Bajeux-Besnainou is the tenth Dean of the Tepper School of Business at Carnegie Mellon University, a post she assumed on October 15, 2020.

As Dean of the Tepper School, Bajeux-Besnainou aims to further develop experiential learning and interdisciplinary collaboration within the business school and Carnegie Mellon, and use the Tepper School's focus on technology and data science to guide business education and skill-based decision-making into the future.

She previously held the position of Dean of the Desautels Faculty of Management at McGill University from September 2015 to October 2020. Under her leadership, the faculty grew its program portfolio strategically to include a series of interdisciplinary minors in Entrepreneurship, a Masters of Management in Finance, and a Masters of Management in Analytics. She also saw the expansion of the faculty's facilities, which culminated with the inauguration of the Donald E. Armstrong Building in May 2018. Bajeux-Besnainou oversaw the development of interdisciplinary programming across all levels in Retail Management (undergraduate, masters, and doctoral) following a transformative $25-million gift from the Bensadoun Family Foundation to McGill University in 2017.

Prior to joining McGill, Bajeux-Besnainou spent 21 years at George Washington University School of Business working as a professor of Finance and in administrative capacities, such as Associate Dean of Undergraduate Programs for three years and the Chair of the Finance Department. As a firm believer in the value of interdisciplinary studies, she developed a new Bachelor of Science degree program and redesigned the Bachelor of Business Administration curriculum to respectively mandate the selection of a double major and a minor outside of the Business School.

As a professor of finance, she has taught extensively at several universities, including Essec Business School in France from 1989 to 1993. Her research interests relate to asset pricing, portfolio management, and credit risk, among other topics. Her work has been published in academic journals, such as: Management Science, Mathematical Finance, Journal of Economic Dynamics and Control, American Economic Review, and The Journal of Business. She has also been an invited speaker on topics such as increasing the representation of women in finance.

Born and raised in Paris, France, Bajeux-Besnainou is an alumna of the École Normale Supérieure in Mathematics and earned a doctorate in Mathematics Applied to Finance in 1989 from Paris Dauphine University.
