= H. Arnold Steinberg =

Canadian businessman (1933–2015)

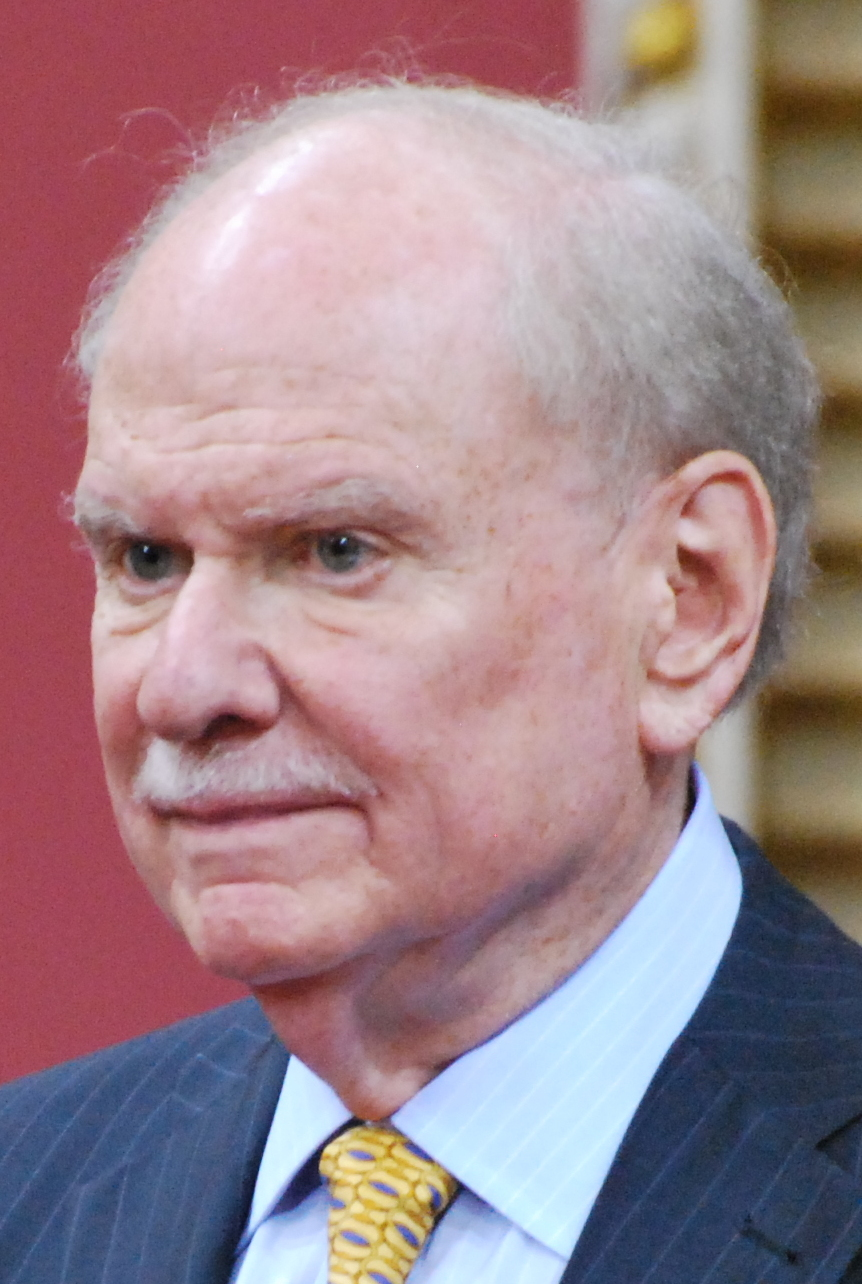
- H. Arnold Steinberg in 2013

18th Chancellor of McGill University
- In office 2009–2014

Personal details
- Born: May 12, 1933 Montreal, Quebec
- Died: December 11, 2015 (aged 82) Montreal, Quebec
- Spouse: Blema Salomon (1934-2017)
- Children: Margot, Donna and Adam
- Occupation: Businessman

H. Arnold Steinberg, CM OQ (May 12, 1933 – December 11, 2015) was a Canadian businessman, philanthropist and Chancellor of McGill University.

== Life and career ==
Born in Montreal, Quebec, in 1933, the son of Nathan (who was the brother of Sam Steinberg) and Annie Steinberg, he received a Bachelor of Commerce degree from the McGill University Faculty of Management in 1954 and a Master of Business Administration degree in 1957 from Harvard Business School.

In 1957, he started working at Dominion Securities Corp. Ltd. before joining his family's Steinberg Inc. in 1958. He would remain at the company until 1989 and was Chief Financial Officer.

From 1996 to 2000, he was Chairman of the Board of the McGill University Health Centre. He was a member of the Governing Council of the Canadian Institutes of Health Research. He was appointed Chancellor of McGill University in May 2009, effective July 1, 2009, succeeding Dick Pound. He served in this capacity until 2014.

He was married to Dr. Blema Steinberg, a professor emerita at McGill University. They had three children: Margot, Donna and Adam. Steinberg died in Montreal on December 11, 2015, at the age of 82.

== Honours and awards ==
In 1993, he was made a Member of the Order of Canada in recognition of having "supported many of Montréal's charitable and cultural institutions". In 2000, he was awarded an honorary doctorate from McGill University. He became an Officer of the Order of Quebec in 2013.
