= Stanley J. Shapiro =

Canadian business theorist

Academic background
- Education: Harvard College; M.B.A., Wharton Business School; PhD., University of Pennsylvania
- Thesis: Decision making, survival and the organized behavior system: a case study of the Ontario Hog Producer Organizations (1961)

Academic work
- Institutions: McGill University; Simon Fraser University

Stanley Jack Shapiro (born 1934) is professor emeritus of Marketing at Simon Fraser University. He has served as dean of McGill University's School of Management and dean of Business Administration for Simon Fraser University.

== Career ==
After earning his PhD., Shapiro travelled to Montreal to work for private industries. While there, he was approached by McGill University and eventually joined their faculty in 1967. From 1973 until 1979, Shapiro served as dean of Business Administration at McGill University's School of Management. During his time as Dean, Shapiro stated that there was influx of French speaking enrolment and women made up 33% of the business programs. He also published a book titled "Basic Marketing: A Global-Managerial Approach"

Beginning in 1988, Shapiro was appointed Simon Fraser University (SFU) dean of business administration until he was replaced by John H. Waterhouse in 1997. Shapiro retired the following year.

In a 2025 interview published in Brazilian Administration Review, Shapiro described his role as a pioneer in the field of macro marketing and emphasize the importance of sustainable society provisioning systems and contemporary marketing research.
