= G. "Anand" Anandalingam =

Professor of Business

- Born: Anand Anandalingam
- Education: University of Cambridge (B.A./M.A.); Harvard University (Ph.D.)
- Scientific career
- Fields: Decision, Operations and Information Technology

G. "Anand" Anandalingam is Ralph J. Tyser Professor of Management Science at the University of Maryland. He was dean of Imperial College Business School at Imperial College London from 2013 to 2017. Prior to that, from 2008 to 2013, he was dean of Robert H. Smith School of Business at the University of Maryland. Before joining the Smith School in 2001, Anandalingam worked at the University of Pennsylvania.

== Academic career ==
Anandalingam received his Ph.D. from Harvard University in 1981, and his B.A./M.A. in electrical sciences from Cambridge University. Before joining the Smith School in 2001, Anandalingam was a faculty member at the University of Pennsylvania for nearly 15 years. At Penn, he was the National Center Professor of Resource and Technology Management and a professor in both the Engineering School and the Wharton School. He also served as the chair of the Department of Systems Engineering and directed the Executive Master's Program in Technology Management.

Anandalingam was appointed dean of the University of Maryland's Smith School of Business in 2008. The school was ranked 24th best business school in the United States by Bloomberg BusinessWeek at the time of Anandalingam's departure as dean. U.S. News ranked the school 37th and Poets and Quants ranked the school 31st at the same time. Anandalingam raised $45 million in donor contributions in five years at Smith despite the 2008 financial crisis.

In 2017, the American University in Cairo (AUC) School of Business announced Anandalingam as a Dean's Strategic Advisory Board member.
