= Knight Therapeutics =

Canadian pharmaceutical company

Knight Therapeutics Inc.
- Type: Public
- Traded as: TSX: GUD; S&P/TSX Composite Component
- Founded: 1995
- Founder: Jonathan Ross Goodman
- Headquarters: Montreal, Quebec, Canada
- Key people: Jonathan Ross Goodman (Executive Chairman); Samira Sakhia (CEO)
- Revenue: $328.199 million (2023)
- Website: gud-knight.com/en

Knight Therapeutics Inc. is a Canadian public specialty pharmaceutical company based in Montreal, Quebec that focuses on acquiring or in-licensing innovative pharmaceutical products for the Canadian and select international markets. It is listed on the Toronto Stock Exchange (symbol GUD), with a market capitalization of $1.02 billion as of August 2019.

== History ==
In 1995, Jonathan Ross Goodman and Mark Beaudet founded Paladin Labs, the predecessor company to Knight Therapeutics. It launched an IPO in that year at $1.50 per share.

In 2011, Goodman was seriously injured in a cycling accident, forcing him to temporarily relinquish the CEO role to Mark Beaudet. The accident caused serious traumatic brain injury, although Goodman has almost fully recovered. Also in 2011, Paladin offered to buy Afexa Life Sciences for $57 million, but was outbid by Valeant Pharmaceuticals. However, it succeeded in acquiring Labopharm for $20 million.

In 2014, Endo Pharmaceuticals, an American pharmaceutical company, acquired most of the assets of Paladin Labs for $3 billion, or $151 a share, a 100 times increase from its IPO price. As part of the transaction, Knight Therapeutics was spun-off to the shareholders of Paladin, with the rights to Impavido, a leishmaniasis drug. It was also led by Jonathan Ross Goodman, and was in substantially the same business.

In November 2016, it was rumored that Endo was considering selling Paladin back to Knight Therapeutics, for less than it initially paid for it.

== Business ==
Knight Therapeutics, like Paladin Labs before it, focuses on marketing and licensing drugs from international drug makers for the Canada and Latin America. This involves getting Health Canada approval for new products, and selling them to Canadian customers. Knight is generally not involved in initial drug discovery or development. As of June 2020, the company commercializes dozens of innovative pharmaceuticals in Canada and 10 Latin American countries with a 700+ employees. Knight's main product portfolios cover Pain/Gastrointestinal, Ophthalmic, Women's Health and Oncology. Its marketed products are Movantik for the treatment of opioid-induced constipation, Probuphine, a sub-dermal implant for opioid dependence, Impavido for the treatment of leishmaniasis and Burinex for edema associated with congestive heart failure, cirrhosis of the liver and renal disease.
