= Kenneth Carter (accountant) =

Canadian accountant (1906–1969)

Kenneth Le Mesurier Carter (21 June 1906 – 11 May 1969) was a Canadian chartered accountant. He is best known for his work as chair of the Royal Commission on Taxation conducted in the 1960s, known as the "Carter Commission".

== Biography ==
Carter was born in Montreal, Quebec, on 21 June 1906. He studied in commerce at McGill University, graduating in 1925. He obtained his degree as a chartered accountant at the same school in 1928. He married Marshall Murdoch, great-great granddaughter of John Marshall, Chief Justice of the United States.

He became a partner at McDonald, Currie & Co., a Toronto-based accountancy firm which later joined the Canadian branch of PwC, in 1935. He served on the boards of various organizations, including as chairman of the board of governors of the Canadian Tax Foundation. His most important work was as the chairman of the Royal Commission which set to investigate the taxation system of Canada. Its normative framework and recommendations for reform would govern how Canadian tax practitioners and academics would see the development of their field. He died shortly after finishing work on the report.
