= Henry Mintzberg =

Canadian academic and author on business and management

Henry Mintzberg OC OQ FRSC
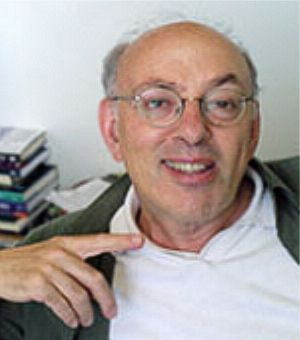
- Born: September 2, 1939 (age 87); Montreal, Quebec, Canada

Academic background
- Education: McGill University (B.Eng 1961); MIT (Ph.D. 1968)

Academic work
- Institutions: Desautels Faculty of Management

Henry Mintzberg OC OQ FRSC is a Canadian academic and author on business and management. He is currently the Cleghorn Professor of Management Studies at the Desautels Faculty of Management of McGill University in Montreal, Quebec, Canada, where he has been teaching since 1968.

== Early life ==
Mintzberg was born on September 2, 1939, in Montreal, Quebec, Canada. He is the son of Jewish parents Myer and Irene (Wexler) Mintzberg. His father, Myer Mintzberg, was a manufacturer.

== Education ==
Henry Mintzberg completed his first undergraduate degree in mechanical engineering at McGill University in 1961. During his time at McGill University he was in two honor societies, was a student council representative, a McGill Daily sports editor, a student athletic council chairman, and more.

Mintzberg then went on to complete his second undergraduate degree in 1962. This degree was a Bachelor of General Arts and he received it from Sir George Williams University, which is now known as Concordia University.

He then completes his Master's degree in Management at MIT Sloan School of Management in 1965. During his studies he was a part of the student government and won the Quebec Fellowship award as well as the M.I.T. Fellowship award.

To finish up his education, Mintzberg returned to Sloan School of Management at M.I.T. and completed his Ph.D. in 1968. He successfully defended his thesis of "The Manager at Work—Determining his Activities, Roles and Programs by Structured Observation" and studied the fields of Policy (major), Organizational Studies, Information and Control Systems, and minor in Political Science. During his time he also received the Ford Fellowship as well as the M.I.T. Fellowship awards.

== Personal life ==
Mintzberg's first wife was Yvette (Hoch) Mintzberg, a ceramicist who has exhibited internationally. They have two children, Susie and Lisa. They divorced after more than twenty years of marriage. He also has three grandchildren, Laura, Tomas, and Maya. Mintzberg has been in a relationship with Dulcie Naimer for approximately twenty years.

Henry Mintzberg likes to write short stories about his personal life experiences and wants to publish them one day. Mintzberg also likes to collect beaver sculptures, and he shares pictures of his collection on his personal website.

== Career ==
From 1991 to 1999, Mintzberg was a visiting professor at INSEAD.

In 2004, he published a book entitled Managers Not MBAs, which outlines what he believes to be wrong with management education today. Mintzberg claims that prestigious graduate management schools like Harvard Business School and the Wharton Business School at the University of Pennsylvania are obsessed with numbers and that their overzealous attempts to make management a science are damaging the discipline of management. Mintzberg advocates more emphasis on post graduate programs that educate practicing managers (rather than students with little real world experience) by relying upon action learning and insights from their own problems and experiences.

Mintzberg has twice won the McKinsey Award for publishing the best article in the Harvard Business Review (despite his critical stance about the strategy consulting business). He is also credited with co-creating the organigraph, which is taught in business schools.

Mintzberg writes on the topics of management and business strategy, with more than 150 articles and fifteen books to his name. His seminal book, The Rise and Fall of Strategic Planning, criticizes some of the practices of strategic planning today.

Mintzberg runs two programs at the Desautels Faculty of Management which have been designed to teach his alternative approach to management and strategic planning: the International Masters in Practicing Management (IMPM) in association with the McGill Executive Institute and the International Masters for Health Leadership (IMHL). With Phil LeNir, he owns Coaching Ourselves International, a private company using his alternative approach for management development directly in the workplace.

In 1997, Dr. Mintzberg was made an Officer of the Order of Canada. In 1998 he was made an Officer of the National Order of Quebec. He is now a member of the Strategic Management Society. During his time as a professor, Dr. Mintzberg has supervised 22 doctoral programs, has been on committee for 14 doctoral programs, and has received a large number of awards both for his work as a professor as well as his work on organizational theory.

Dr. Mintzberg was awarded several honorary degrees throughout his career: University of Venice (1983); University of Lund (1989); Université de Lausanne (1991); Écoles des Hautes Études Commerciales de Montréal (HEC Montréal) (1991); Université de Geneva (1995); Université de Liège (1996); Simon Fraser University (1997); University of Ghent (1998); Lancaster University (1998); Université Paris IX (Dauphine 2001); Concordia University (2001); Memorial University (2002); McMasters University (2002); The New School (NY 2008); ESADE (Barcelona 2008); Universidad del Pacifico (Lima 2011); Institute Supérieur de Management (Dakar 2012); Ecole Nationale Superieure des Mines (Saint Etienne, 2013); Prague University of Economics and Business (2016); National University of San Marcos (Peru 2020).

== Contribution to organization theory ==
The organizational configurations framework of Mintzberg is a model that describes six valid organizational configurations (originally only five; the sixth one was added later):

1. Simple structure, characteristic of entrepreneurial organization
2. Machine bureaucracy
3. Professional bureaucracy
4. Diversified form
5. Adhocracy, or innovative organization
6. Missionary organization, or idealistic organization

Regarding the coordination between different tasks, Mintzberg defines the following mechanisms:

1. Mutual adjustment, which achieves coordination by the simple process of informal communication (as between two operating employees)
2. Direct supervision is achieved by having one person issue orders or instructions to several others whose work interrelates (as when a boss tells others what is to be done, one step at a time)
3. Standardization of work processes, which achieves coordination by specifying the work processes of people carrying out interrelated tasks (those standards usually being developed in the technostructure to be carried out in the operating core, as in the case of the work instructions that come out of time-and-motion studies)
4. Standardization of outputs, which achieves coordination by specifying the results of different work (again usually developed in the technostructure, as in a financial plan that specifies subunit performance targets or specifications that outline the dimensions of a product to be produced)
5. Standardization of skills (as well as knowledge), in which different work is coordinated by virtue of the related training the workers have received (as in medical specialists—say a surgeon and an anesthetist in an operating room—responding almost automatically to each other's standardized procedures)
6. Standardization of norms, in which it is the norms infusing the work that are controlled, usually for the entire organization, so that everyone functions according to the same set of beliefs (as in a religious order)

According to the organizational configurations model of Mintzberg, each organization can consist of a maximum of six basic parts:

1. Strategic apex (top management)
2. Middle line (middle management)
3. Operating core (operations, operational processes)
4. Technostructure (analysts that design systems, processes, etc.)
5. Support staff (support outside of operating workflow)
6. Ideology (halo of beliefs and traditions; norms, values, culture)

== Contribution to business strategy theory ==
Perhaps the most distinctive feature of Mintzberg's research findings and writing on business strategy, is that they have often emphasized the importance of emergent strategy, which arises informally at any level in an organisation, as an alternative or a complement to deliberate strategy, which is determined consciously either by top management or with the acquiescence of top management. He has been strongly critical of the stream of strategy literature which focuses predominantly on deliberate strategy, and refers to "strategic planning" as an oxymoron.

== Bibliography ==
- The Nature of Managerial Work (1973), Harper & Row.
- The Structuring of Organizations: A Synthesis of the Research (1979), Prentice-Hall.
- Power in and Around Organizations (1983), Prentice-Hall; ISBN 978-0-13-686857-6.
- Structure in Fives: Designing Effective Organizations (1983), Prentice-Hall; ISBN 978-0-13-854349-5.
- Mintzberg on Management: Inside Our Strange World of Organizations (1989), Simon and Schuster; ISBN 978-0-02-921371-1.
- The Rise and Fall of Strategic Planning: Reconceiving Roles for Planning, Plans, Planners. New York City, NY: Simon and Schuster. 1994. ISBN 978-1-4391-0735-5.
- Why I Hate Flying: Tales for the Tormented Traveler (2001), Texere;ISBN 978-1-58799-063-2.
- Strategy Safari: A Guided Tour Through The Wilds of Strategic Management (with Bruce Ahlstrand; Joseph Lampel, 2005), Simon and Schuster; ISBN 978-0-7432-7057-1.
- Managers, not MBAs: a hard look at the soft practice of managing and management development. San Francisco, CA: Berrett-Koehler. 2004. ISBN 978-1576753514.
- Tracking Strategies: Toward a General Theory (2007), OUP Oxford; ISBN 978-0-19-160779-0.
- Managing (2009), Berrett-Koehler Publishers; ISBN 9781576753408.
- Simply Managing: What Managers Do — and Can Do Better (2013), Berrett-Koehler Publishers; ISBN 9781609949235.
- Management? It's Not What You Think! (2013), Pearson UK; ISBN 978-0-273-74881-6.
- Strategy Bites Back (2013), Pearson UK; ISBN 0-273-74716-9.
- Rebalancing Society: Radical Renewal Beyond Left, Right, and Center (2014), Berrett-Koehler Publishers; ISBN 9781626563179.
- Managing the Myths of Health Care: Bridging the Separations between Care, Cure, Control, and Community (2017), Berrett-Koehler Publishers; ISBN 9781626569058.
- Bedtime Stories for Managers: Farewell to Lofty Leadership. . . Welcome Engaging Management (2019), Berrett-Koehler Publishers; ISBN 9781523098781.
