= Dick Pound =

Canadian athlete and lawyer (born 1942)

Dick Pound CC OQ CD KC OLY
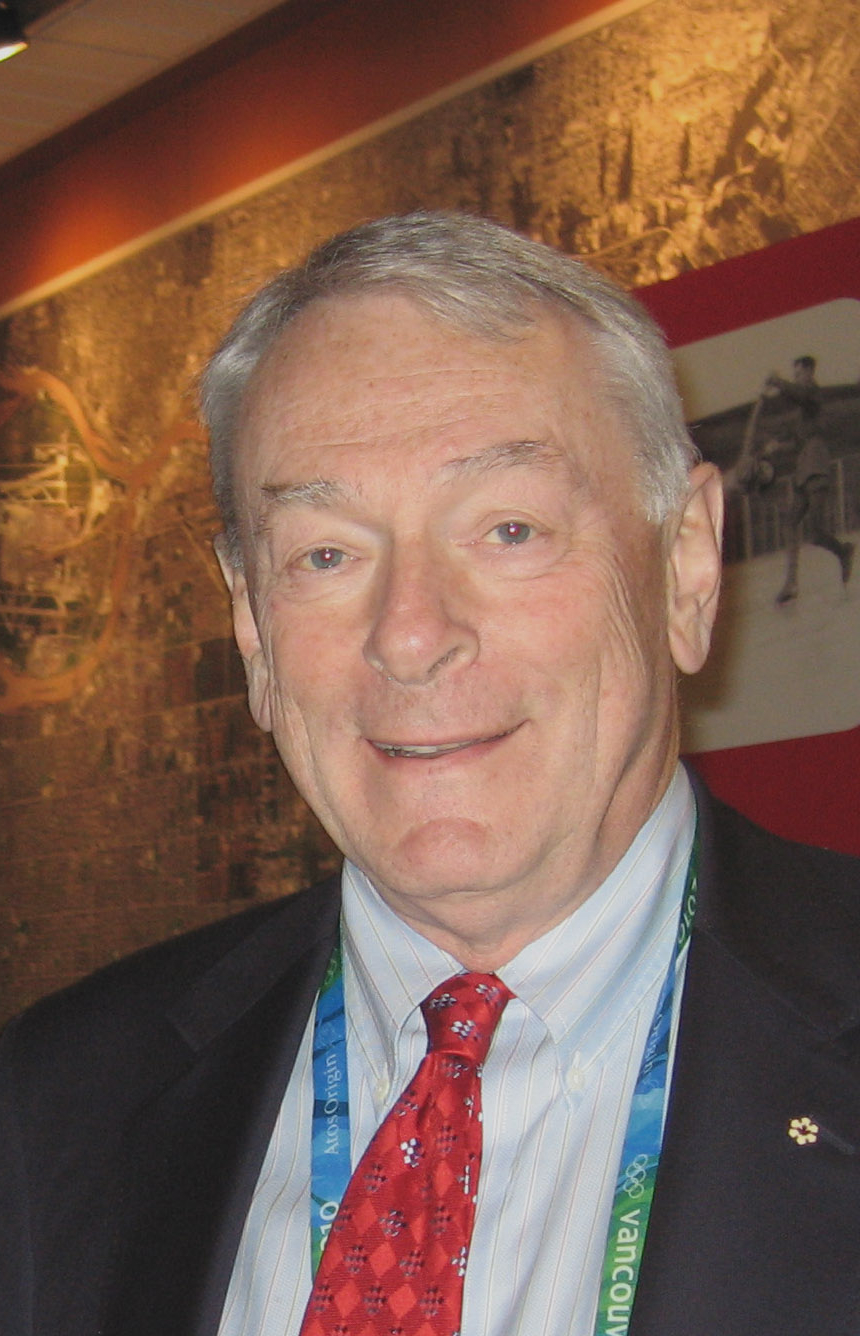
- Pound in 2010

Chairman of Olympic Broadcasting Services
- Incumbent
- Assumed office April 4, 2014
- Preceded by: Hein Verbruggen

1st President of the World Anti-Doping Agency
- In office November 10, 1999 – December 31, 2007
- Preceded by: Position established
- Succeeded by: John Fahey

17th Chancellor of McGill University
- In office July 1, 1999 – June 2009
- Preceded by: Gretta Chambers
- Succeeded by: H. Arnold Steinberg

Vice-President of the International Olympic Committee
- In office 1996–2000
- President: Juan Antonio Samaranch
- In office 1987–1991
- President: Juan Antonio Samaranch

President of the Canadian Olympic Committee
- In office 1977–1982
- Preceded by: Harold Wright
- Succeeded by: Roger Jackson

Personal details
- Born: Richard William Duncan Pound; March 22, 1942 (age 84) St. Catharines, Ontario, Canada
- Party: Liberal
- Spouse: Julie Keith
- Education: McGill University; Sir George Williams University
- Occupation: Lawyer; author

Medal record

Men's swimming

Representing Canada

British Empire and Commonwealth Games
Gold medal – first place	1962 Perth	110 yd freestyle
Silver medal – second place	1962 Perth	4×110 yd freestyle relay
Silver medal – second place	1962 Perth	4×220 yd freestyle relay
Bronze medal – third place	1962 Perth	4×110 yd medley relay

Richard William Duncan Pound (born March 22, 1942), better known as Dick Pound, is a Canadian swimming champion, lawyer, and spokesman for ethics in sport. He was the first president of the World Anti-Doping Agency and vice-president of the International Olympic Committee. He is currently the longest-serving member of the IOC.

Pound is a staunch advocate of strict drug testing for athletes, and has made many allegations of cheating and official corruption, some of them challenged, owing to disputes over the testing and reporting procedures. Time magazine featured him as one of the "100 Most Influential People in the World". He was a chancellor of McGill University and was chairman of the board of Olympic Broadcasting Services.

== Early life and education ==
Pound was born on March 22, 1942, in St. Catharines, Ontario, the eldest of four children. His father was an engineer at a pulp-and-paper mill, and the family moved often. His family moved to numerous Quebec towns, including La Tuque and Trois Rivières. When Pound was six, his family moved to Ocean Falls, British Columbia. He later moved to Montreal in 1957 and attended Mount Royal High School in Mount Royal, Quebec.

In addition to swimming, Pound was a squash player and won the Canadian intercollegiate championship twice.

In 1962, he earned a Bachelor of Commerce degree from McGill University and was on the Dean's List. One of his classmates was John Cleghorn. He received a licentiate in accounting from McGill in 1964 and got his chartered accountant designation the same year. He received a Bachelor of Arts degree with honours from Sir George Williams University (now Concordia University) in 1963 and graduated from the McGill University Faculty of Law with a Bachelor of Civil Law degree in 1967. During his time at McGill, he swam for the McGill Redmen from 1958 to 1962 and from 1964 to 1967. He established school records in every freestyle event, winning three Canadian intercollegiate gold medals in each of his freshman, sophomore, and senior years. He was honoured by the Scarlet Key Society and was awarded the Carswell Company Prize. He served as managing editor of the McGill Law Journal.

== Career ==
=== Swimming ===
Pound won the Canadian freestyle championship four times (1958, 1960, 1961, and 1962) and the Canadian butterfly championship in 1961. He competed for Canada at the 1959 Pan American Games in Chicago and the 1960 Summer Olympics in Rome, where he finished sixth in the 100 meter freestyle and was fourth with the 4 × 100 m relay team. He won one gold, two silver, and one bronze medals at the 1962 British Empire and Commonwealth Games in Perth, Western Australia and set a Commonwealth record in the 110 yd freestyle.

=== Canadian Olympic Committee ===
After Pound retired from competitive swimming, he served as secretary of the Canadian Olympic Committee in 1968. He was president of the organization from 1977 to 1982.

=== Olympics ===
Pound was the Deputy Chef de mission of the Canadian delegation for the 1972 Summer Olympics in Munich. He was director and executive member of the Organizing Committee for the 1988 Winter Olympics in Calgary and director of the Canadian Bidding Committee for hosting the 2010 Winter Olympics in Vancouver. Pound was the former Secretary of the Canadian Squash Rackets Association, as well as a former member of the Pan-American Sports Organization (PASO) Executive Commission and Legislative Commission.

In 1978, Pound was elected to the International Olympic Committee and put in charge of negotiating television and sponsorship deals. He was on the IOC executive committee for 16 years, as vice-president from 1987 to 1991 and again from 1996 to 2000, and was a one-time candidate for the presidency of the organization. Pound revolutionized the Olympic movement using such deals to transform the IOC into a multibillion-dollar enterprise. He became known as an outspoken critic of corruption within the IOC, while at the same time supporting the leadership of IOC President Juan Antonio Samaranch. His criticisms were given a wide airing after the scandals surrounding the 2002 Salt Lake City Olympics broke, and he was then appointed head of the inquiry into the corruption. He also campaigned vehemently for stronger drug testing. Within the ISO, Pound has been in a variety of positions throughout the years, he was Member of the Executive Board (1983–1987, 1992–1996), Vice-President of the IOC (1987–1991, 1996–2000), Chairman of the following Commissions: Protection of the Olympic Games (1981–1983), Television Rights Negotiations (1983–2001), Marketing (1988–2001), Coordination for the Games of the XXVI Olympiad in Atlanta in 1996 (1991–1997), Olympic Games Study (2002–2003), Vice Chairman of the Eligibility Commission (1990–1991). As well as being a member of the following Commissions: Preparation of the XII Olympic Congress (1988–1989), Protection of the Emblems (1974–1977), Eligibility (1984–1987), Olympic Movement (1983–1991, 1992–1999), Programme (1985–1987), Juridical (1993–2015), Study of the Centennial Olympic Congress – Congress of Unity (1994–1996), Sport and Law (1995–2001 and 2014–2015), "IOC 2000" (Executive Committee, 1999), Marketing (2005–), Olympic Philately Numismatics and Memorabilia (2014–2015), Legal Affairs (2015–2018), Communications (2018–), Chair of the boards of directors of Olympic Broadcasting Services S.A. Switzerland and S.L., Spain (2014–2018), Member of the Board of directors of Olympic Channel Services S.L., Spain (2015–2018), IOC Representative on International Council of Arbitration for Sport (2016–2018), and Arbitrator, Court of Arbitration for Sport (1985–2006, 2018–).

With the retirement of Samaranch in 2001, he ran for president of the IOC, but the IOC chose Belgian Jacques Rogge. Pound finished third behind South Korean Kim Un-Yong, who was one of those found to have participated in the Salt Lake City scandals, and who was later prosecuted by the South Korean government.

On April 4, 2014, he was appointed chairman of the board of Olympic Broadcasting Services. He headed the independent commission that investigated the doping scandal in Russian athletics on behalf of WADA from December 2014 and presented its first partial report in November 2015, where the exclusion of the Russian Federation from international competitions was recommended.

=== World Anti-Doping Agency ===
Pound scaled back his involvement with the IOC. He helped found World Anti-Doping Agency, based in Montreal, and became the organization's first president. In that role he oversaw an unprecedented toughening of the drug-testing regimen. Pound was an especially harsh critic of the Americans, arguing that there is widespread doping, especially amongst their track and field team. He also worked to expand WADA beyond the Olympics, calling on the major sports leagues to agree to WADA scrutiny. His allegations of widespread doping in professional bicycle racing at times brought WADA into fierce public conflict with the Union Cycliste Internationale (UCI). Pound's term as WADA president ended at the end of 2007; he chose not to run for another term.

Pound chaired a commission investigating doping in Russia in track and field (athletics). The commission released its report in November 2015, accusing the Russian state of being complicit in illegal doping, requesting suspension of the Russian Athletics Federation, suspending RUSADA and firing its director and declaring it was rife with corruption; and accusing Russian Sports Minister Vitaly Mutko of cover-ups. The report released by Pound's commission instigated an INTERPOL investigation. The commission's investigation also involved Russia's FSB spying on RUSADA during the Sochi Olympics.

=== Law ===
He is a partner in the law firm of Stikeman Elliott LLP in Montreal. He practises tax law. He is also the author of several books on legal history. He edits Pound’s Tax Case Notes, a review of tax-law court cases for lawyers. He did much of the reading of cases and the writing of the notes on international airplane flights to and from International Olympic Committee functions.

== Controversies ==
=== NHL ===
Discussing the National Hockey League in November 2005, Pound said, "you wouldn't be far wrong if you said a third of hockey players are gaining some pharmaceutical assistance". Pound would later admit that he completely invented the figure. Both the NHL and NHLPA have denied the claims, demanding Pound provide evidence rather than make what they term unsubstantiated claims. Since his comments were made, some NHL players have tested positive for banned substances, including Bryan Berard, José Théodore, and two of 250 players involved in Olympic testing. As of June 2006, there had been 1,406 tests in the program jointly administered by the league and the union, and none has come up with banned substances under NHL rules. Pound remained sceptical, claiming the NHL rules were too lax and unclear, and do not test for some banned substances, including certain stimulants. In an interview with hockey blogger B. D. Gallof of Hockeybuzz, on December 19, 2007, Pound was asked to expand on the 30 per cent comment and subsequent reaction, and gave his opinion that stimulants were "the NHL's drug of choice". He also stated his belief that NHL drug testing will have no credibility if it continues to be conducted "in-house".

=== Lance Armstrong ===
In January 2004, Le Monde quoted Pound as saying that "the public knows that the riders in the Tour de France and the others are doping." This prompted a strongly worded rebuke from Lance Armstrong, who called Pound's comments "careless and unacceptable". Pound said he was surprised by the personal nature of Armstrong's response because he had never mentioned the cyclist by name.

Around the same time, scientists at a French lab were using frozen urine samples from the 1999 Tour de France to find a new way of detecting erythropoietin (EPO), an oxygen-boosting agent. The samples did not have names attached to them, only numbers, and were provided for research purposes only. But an article in the August 23, 2005, edition of L'Équipe reported finding documentation linking the numbers with the riders, with the findings from the research with samples linked to Armstrong, claiming that six of his 15 samples showed traces of EPO. Pound told the media that there was "now an onus on Lance Armstrong and the others to explain how it is EPO got into their systems."

The Union Cycliste Internationale launched an inquiry, led by lawyer Emile Vrijman, former head of the Netherlands' anti-doping agency (and later defence lawyer of athletes accused of doping). In his 132-page report, leaked to the media on May 31, 2006, Vrijman said no proper records were kept of the samples and that there had been no chain of custody and no process to ensure that the samples had not been spiked with banned substances at the laboratory. The report was highly critical of WADA and Pound, concluding that they had specifically targeted Armstrong and the UCI. The report also called for an investigation to "focus on the communications between Dick Pound and the media" and recommended that no disciplinary action be taken against any athletes.

In response, Pound dismissed the Vrijman report as "so lacking in professionalism and objectivity that it borders on farcical". WADA released an official statement, criticising the Vrijman report as biased, ill-informed, speculative, and "fallacious in many aspects".

On June 9, 2006, Armstrong sent an eight-page letter to Jacques Rogge, president of the International Olympic Committee, demanding that action be taken against Pound. He wrote that Pound was guilty of "reprehensible and indefensible" behaviour and "must be suspended or expelled from the Olympic movement". In February 2007, the IOC ethics committee recommended that Pound exercise greater prudence in his public pronouncements. It declined to move toward removing Pound as an IOC member, and found it had no jurisdiction over WADA. In response, Pound said he was accountable to WADA, not to the IOC.

In 2013, Armstrong admitted that he had taken banned substances.

=== "Savages" comment ===
On August 9, 2008, during a conversation in French, when asked about whether the IOC was embarrassed to be affiliated with Chinese government's recent political history, he was quoted as replying: "We must not forget that 400 years ago, Canada was a land of savages, with scarcely 10,000 inhabitants of European origin, while in China, we're talking about a 5,000-year-old civilization."

Two months later, the Aboriginal advocacy group LandInSights asked for him to be suspended from the International Olympic Committee for the remark. Pound responded that it was a clumsy remark that was taken out of context, and that in the particular French expression used, "un pays de sauvages", the French sauvages was not equivalent to English "savages".

=== Peng Shuai ===
In early December 2021, Pound told the media that the "unanimous conclusion" of those on a call with Peng Shuai was that she is "fine". After speculation that the call was with Peng under duress, the IOC later backtracked on Pound's comments and said that it "can't give any assurances".

== Personal life ==
Dick Pound resides in Westmount, Quebec, with his second wife, Montreal author Julie Keith. He has three children from his first marriage and two stepchildren from his second.

== Honours ==
He was inducted into the Canadian Aquatics (1972), and the Canadian Olympic (1975).

Pound received an honorary doctorate from the United States Sports Academy in Daphne in 1988.

In 1992, he was made an Officer of the Order of Canada and in 1993 was made an Officer of the National Order of Quebec. In 2014, Pound was appointed a Companion of the Order of Canada.

In 1993, He was inducted into the Canadian Amateur Athletic.

Pound was awarded the Gold and Silver Star of the Order of the Sacred Treasure by the government of Japan in 1998.

In 2002, he received the Canadian Olympic Order (gold), International Swimming Hall of Fame Golf Medallion Award.

In 2005, Time magazine featured him as one of the "100 Most Influential People in the World".

In 2008, he won the Laureus Spirit of Sport Award for his work at WADA and was named Chancellor emeritus at McGill University.

He has been the Honorary Colonel of the Canadian Grenadier Guards (CGG) since 2008.

In 2010, he was inducted into McGill University's Sports Hall of Fame.

In 2011, he was inducted into the Canada's Sports Hall of Fame.

Pound joined McGill University's board of governors in 1986 and was elected chair in 1994. He served as Chancellor of McGill University from July 1, 1999 to 2009.

== Published works ==
- Pound, Richard W. (1994). Five Rings over Korea: The Secret Negotiations Behind the 1988 Olympic Games in Seoul. Little Brown & Co. ISBN 978-0316715072.
- Pound, Richard W. (2000). Chief Justice W.R. Jackett: By the Law of the Land. McGill-Queen's University Press. ISBN 978-0773518988.
- Pound, Richard W. (2002). Stikeman Elliott: The First Fifty Years. McGill-Queen's University Press. ISBN 978-0773524118.
- Pound, Richard W. (2004). Inside the Olympics: A Behind-the-Scenes Look at the Politics, the Scandals and the Glory of the Games. Wiley. ISBN 978-0470838709.
- Pound, Richard W. (2006). Inside Dope: How Drugs Are the Biggest Threat to Sports, Why You Should Care, and What Can Be Done About Them. Wiley. ISBN 978-0470837337.
- Pound, Richard W. (2007). Unlucky to the End: The Story of Janise Marie Gamble. McGill-Queen's University Press. ISBN 978-0773533004.
- Pound, Richard W. (2008). Rocke Robertson: Surgeon and Shepherd of Change. McGill-Queen's University Press. ISBN 978-0773533745.
- Pound, Richard W. (2013). Quotations for the Fast Lane. McGill-Queen's University Press. ISBN 978-0773542983.
- Pound, Richard W. (2014). Made in Court: Supreme Court Cases that Shaped Canada. Fitzhenry & Whiteside. ISBN 978-1554553471.

== See also ==
- List of Commonwealth Games medallists in swimming (men)

Academic offices
Preceded by Gretta Chambers	Chancellor of McGill University; 1999–2009	Succeeded by H. Arnold Steinberg
