= Tommaso Valletti =

Economist and professor)

Professor Tommaso Valletti
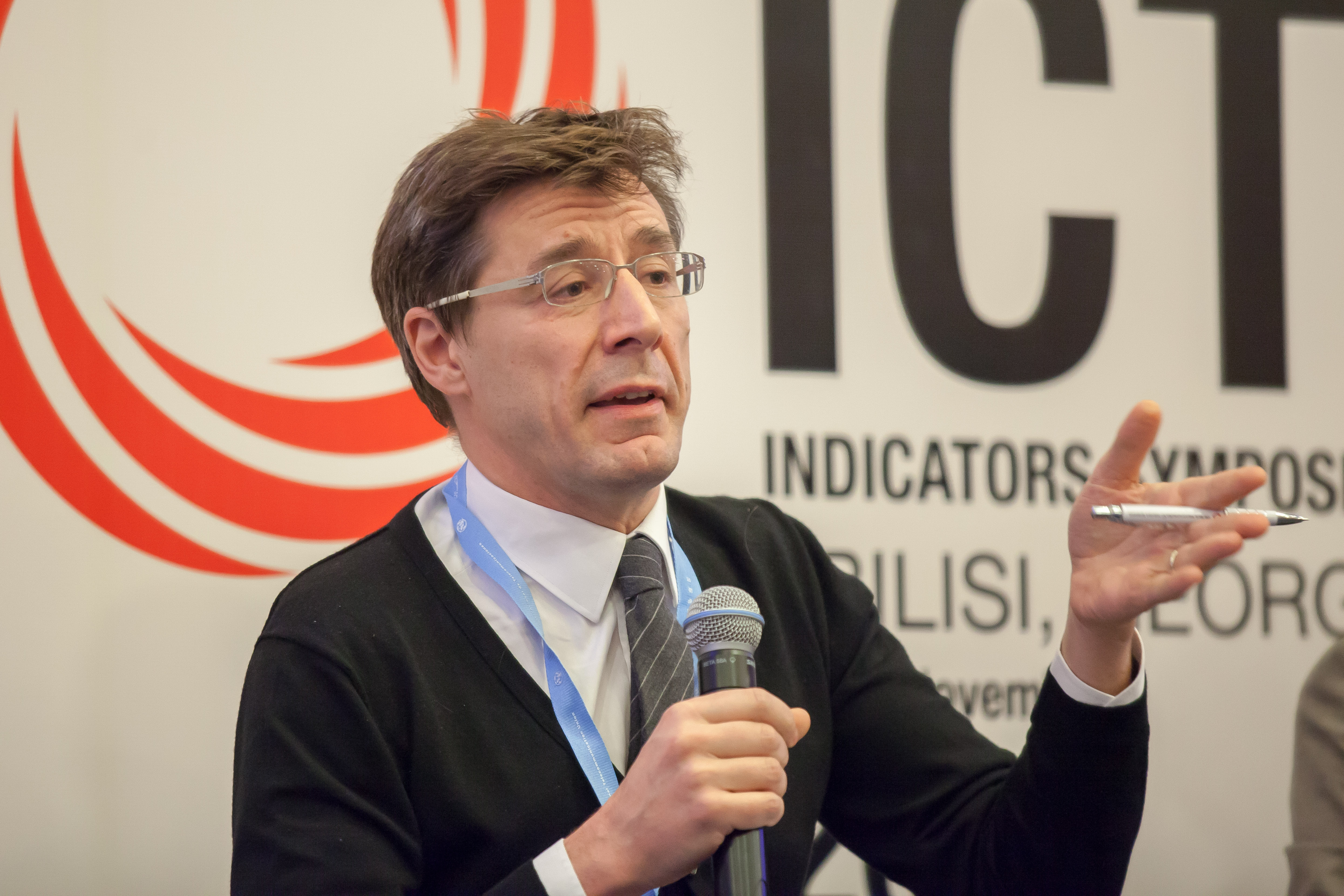
- Portrait of Professor Tommaso Valletti speaking at WTIS 2014.
- Born: 1969

Academic background
- Education: London School of Economics

Academic work
- Discipline: Economics
- Sub-discipline: Industrial Organization
- Institutions: Imperial College London
- Website: https://www.imperial.ac.uk/people/t.valletti

Tommaso M. Valletti is Professor of Economics at Imperial College Business School, and also Professor of Economics at the University of Rome Tor Vergata (Italy). He is a Fellow of CEPR. He is a Non-Executive Director to the board of the UK's Payment Systems Regulator.

He was the Chief Competition Economist of the European Commission's Directorate-General for Competition (DG COMP) in Brussels between September 2016 and August 2019. He was a Non-Executive Director to the board of the Financial Conduct Authority in London between 2019 and 2022.

In the period 2010-2012 he held the chair in “Innovation and Regulation of Digital Services” at Telecom ParisTech and Ecole Polytechnique in Paris.

Valletti ranks among the top 2% of economists registered on IDEAS/RePEc.

== Education and career ==
Tommaso holds a magna cum laude degree in engineering and a flute diploma from Turin. He also earned an MSc and PhD in economics from the London School of Economics.

He currently serves as the Head of the Department of Economics and Public Policy at Imperial College London, where he has been working in shaping academic research on economic competition and public policy.

== Research ==
Valletti’s research focuses on Industrial Organization and ways to improve public interventions in markets.

In work with Christos Genakos, Valletti finds evidence of a “waterbed effect” in mobile phones – whereby the regulatory pressure to cut certain network fees, can cause another set of prices to rise. Still in the telecoms industry, in work with Gabriel Ahlfeldt and Pantelis Koutroumpis, he devises a method to infer the willingness-to-pay for high-speed broadband internet via the impact that the rollout of the internet had on property prices in the UK. In work with Alessandro Gavazza and Mattia Nardotto, he finds that the rollout of the internet had a negative impact on voter turnout in UK elections.

With Giulio Federico and Greg Langus, he analyzes the impact that mergers have on innovation. In the absence of efficiencies and spillovers, they find a negative effect on consumer welfare and develop an “innovation theory of harm” that found application in antitrust cases such as the merger between Dow and Dupont, and Bayer and Monsanto.

His most cited work is on the identification of corruption and inefficiency in public procurement, in joint work with Oriana Bandiera and Andrea Prat.
