= Imperial Business School =

Business school in London, England

Coordinates: 51.4992°N 0.1748°W

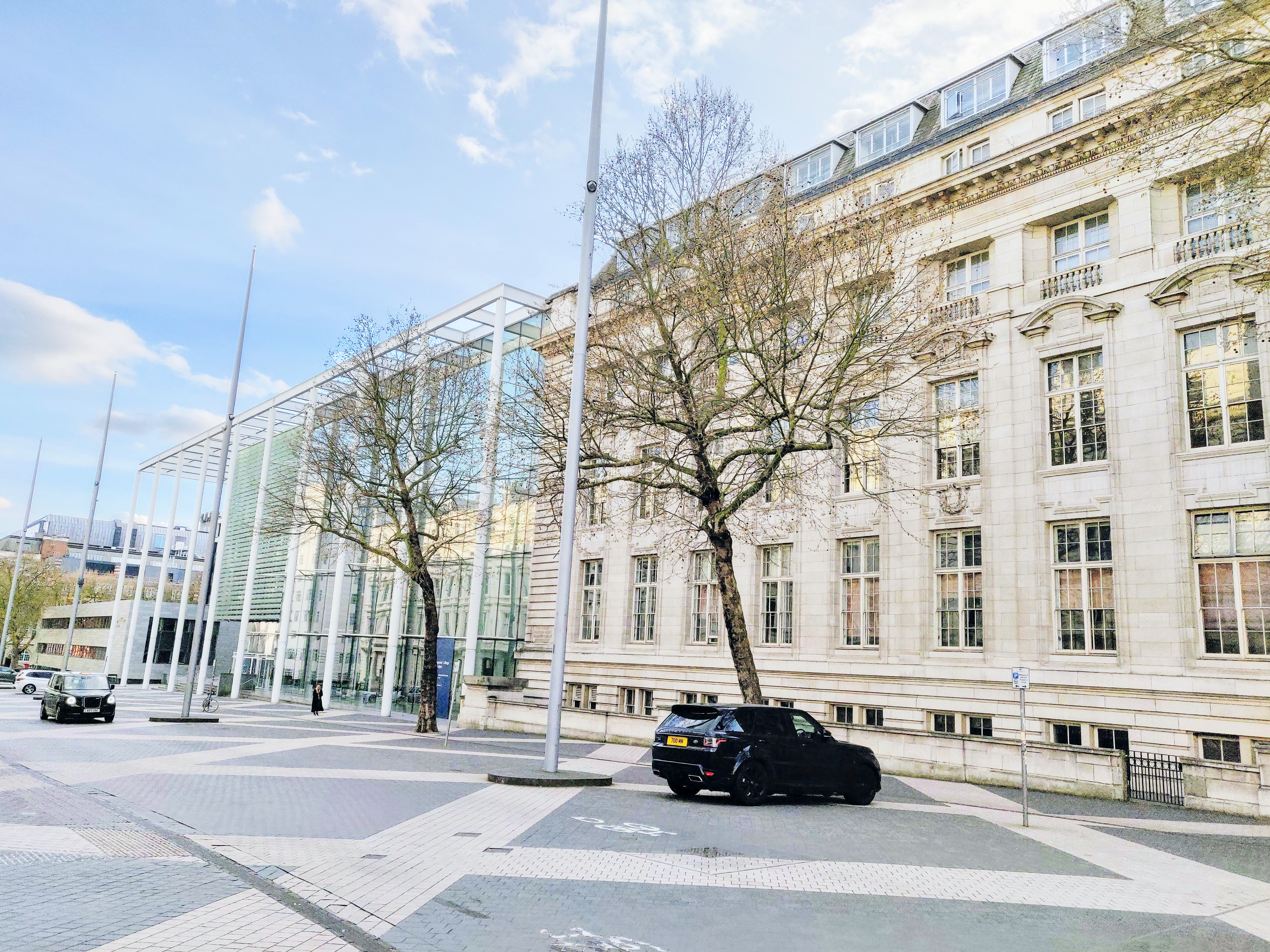
- Motto: Where science means business
- Established: 1955 (origins); 2003 (as a business school)
- Parent institution: Imperial College London
- Accreditation: AACSB, EQUIS, AMBA
- Dean: Peter Todd
- Location: London
- Website: imperial.ac.uk/business-school

Imperial Business School is the business school of Imperial College London, a specialist university in science, engineering, medicine and business. It grew out of a 1955 master's in management science in production engineering, and developed into a management school in 1987. Imperial Business School gained faculty status from Imperial College London in 2003, with its building opened by Queen Elizabeth II.

The school offers undergraduate, master's, MBA and PhD programmes, along with executive education. Its student body is primarily postgraduate and international students. The business school holds triple accreditation from AMBA in the United Kingdom, AACSB in the United States, and EQUIS in Europe.

In the most recent Research Excellence Framework, Imperial ranked 2nd in the UK for business and management studies. In the latest QS MBA by Career Specialisation Rankings, its MBA was ranked 1st in Europe and 3rd worldwide for entrepreneurship.

== History ==
In 1851, Prince Albert, the husband of Queen Victoria, organised the Great Exhibition, the first world's fair. He planned to use its profits to build the Victoria and Albert Museum, the Natural History Museum, the Science Museum, the Royal Albert Hall and colleges in South Kensington.

In 1907, three of these colleges – the Royal College of Science, the Royal School of Mines and the City and Guilds College – were united by royal charter as Imperial College London. In 1909, King Edward VII laid the foundation stone of the Royal School of Mines building, which now forms part of the business school.

In 1955, Imperial began teaching management with a one-year postgraduate course in production engineering – one of Britain's first in management science. In 1964, Imperial and the London School of Economics co-sponsored the founding of the London Business School.

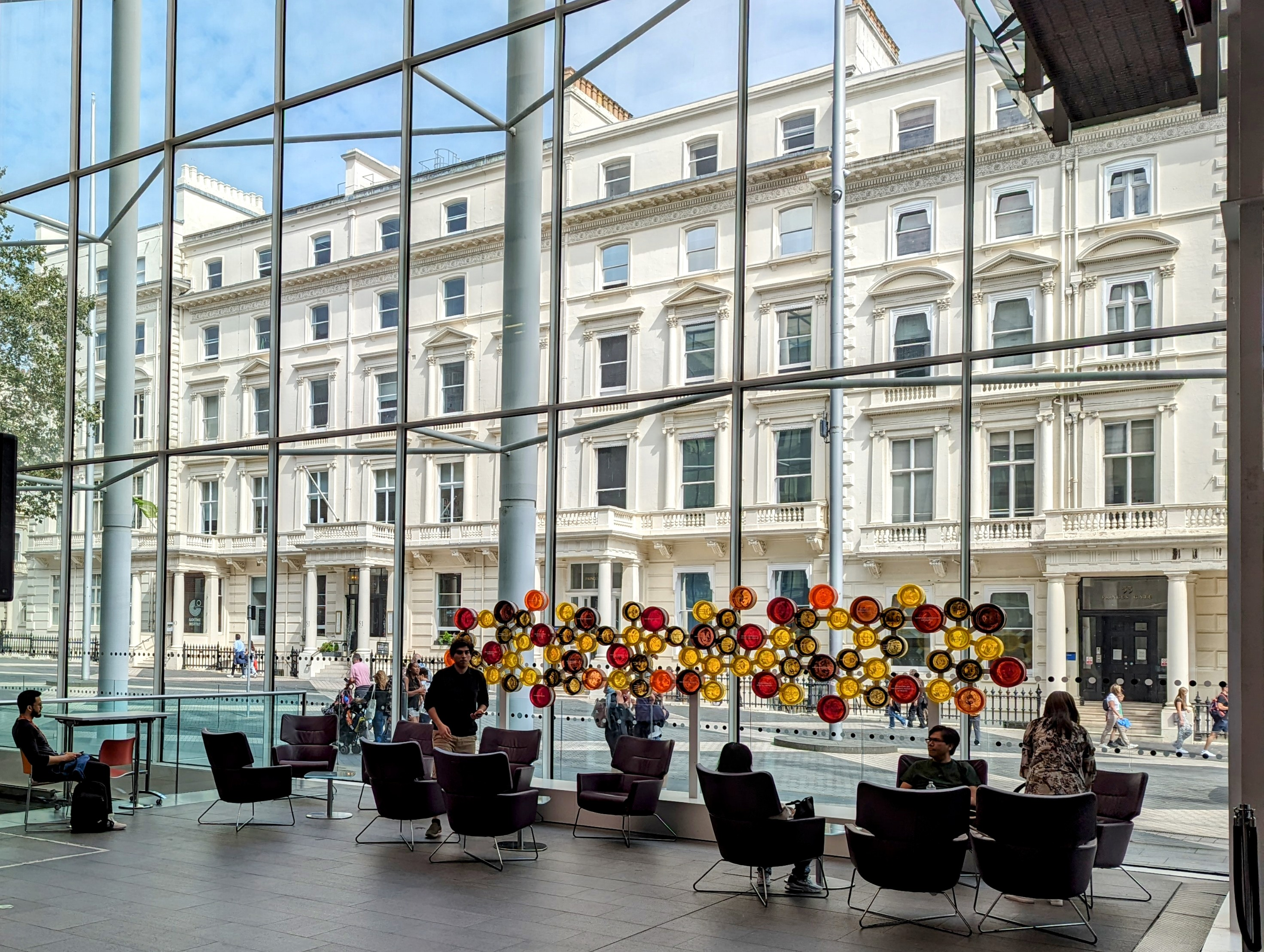
View from the entrance. Across the street is the Brevan Howard Centre for Financial Analysis.

Imperial established a Department of Management Science in 1971, followed by a Department of Social and Economic Studies in 1978. In 1987, the two departments merged to form the Management School, which focused on integrating management studies with emerging technology and entrepreneurship.

In January 2003, the Management School became the Business School. It is now one of Imperial's four faculties, alongside Engineering, Medicine and Natural Sciences. In 2004, Queen Elizabeth II opened the school's new building.

In 2014, the Brevan Howard Centre for Financial Analysis was opened, funded by what was then thought to be the largest donation ever made to a UK business school. In 2021, the school opened a new facility at Imperial's White City campus, giving it more space for innovation and entrepreneurship.

== Facilities ==
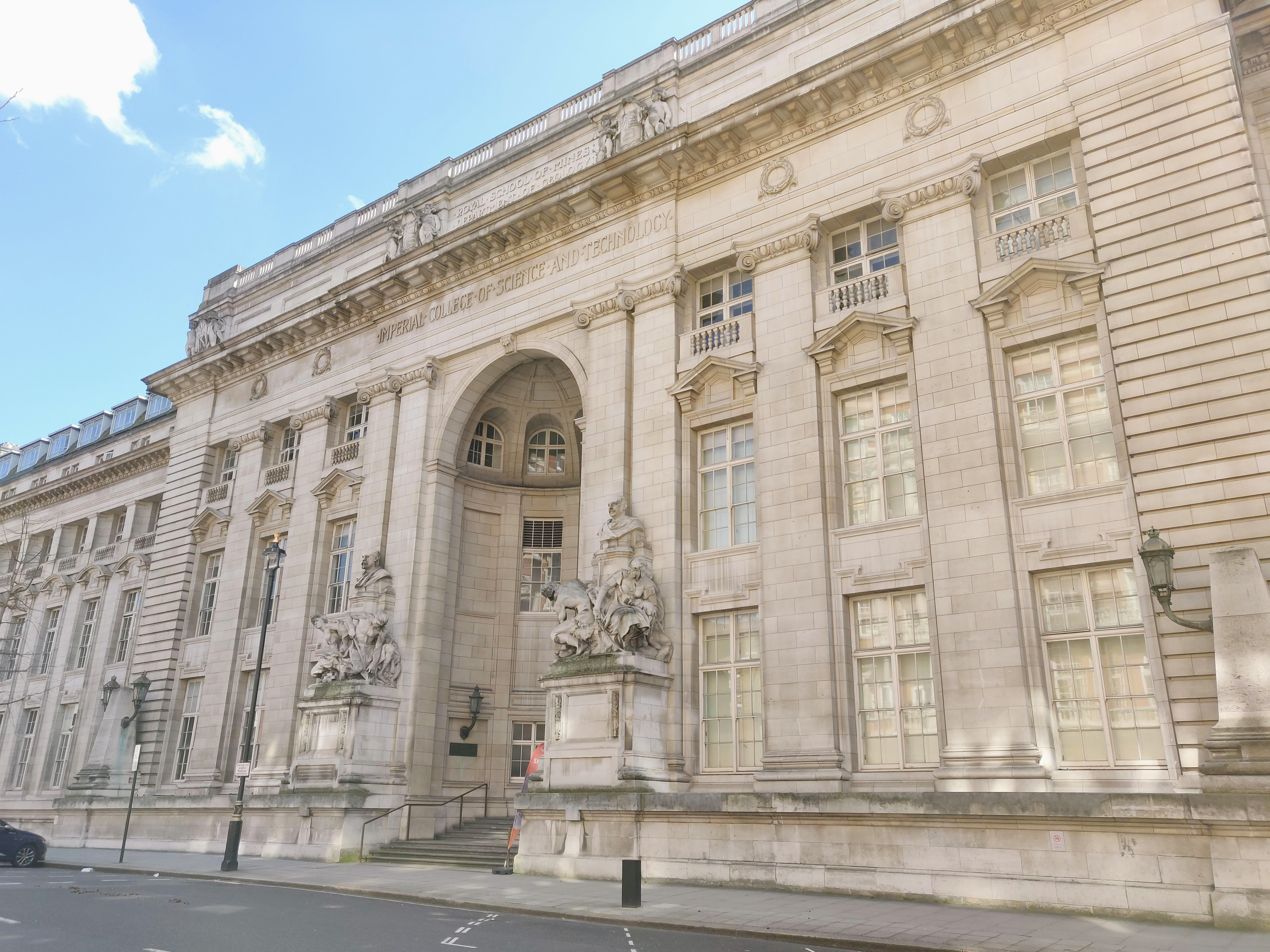
Royal School of Mines

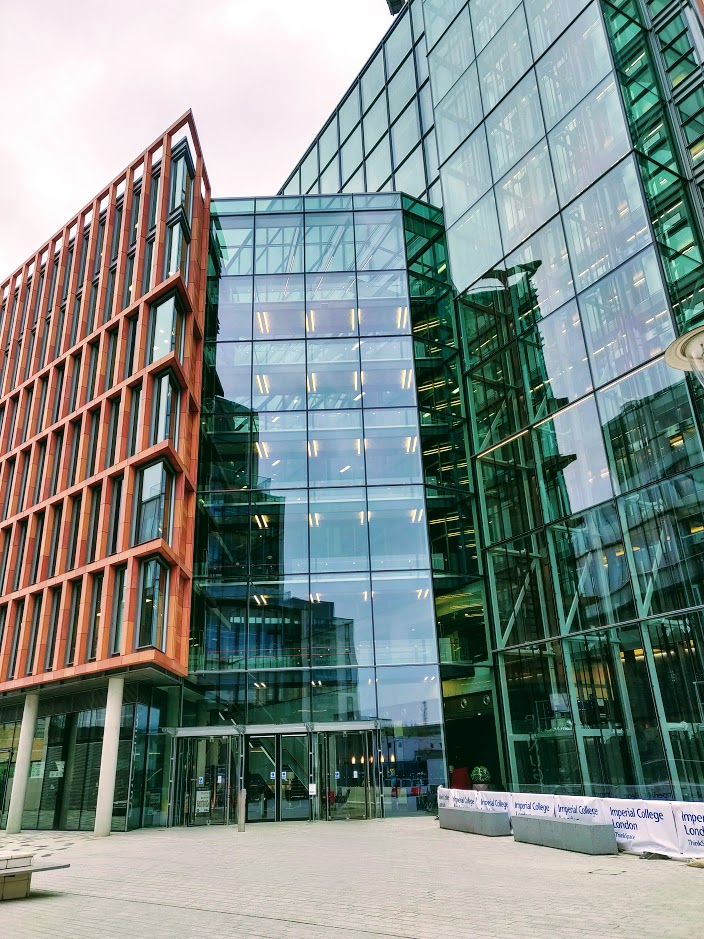
Translation & Innovation Hub

The school is based on Imperial's South Kensington campus, in a building designed by Foster + Partners, the practice of Norman Foster. Its glass-fronted design has been compared to the Great Exhibition's Crystal Palace, reflecting the college's historical origins. The building incorporates the Royal School of Mines wing, including its vaults, combining modern and Edwardian architecture.

The school also has a presence at Imperial's White City campus, the university's hub for innovation and entrepreneurship. Resources there include the White City Incubator, Scale Space, the Translation & Innovation Hub, the Invention Rooms and a hackspace offering manufacturing equipment and training.

== Academics ==
The school focuses mainly on postgraduate education, offering MBA, master's and PhD programmes, as well as executive education and undergraduate degrees.

It is triple accredited by AMBA (UK), AACSB (US) and EQUIS (Europe), and is organised into five academic areas: Analytics & Operations, Economics & Public Policy, Finance, Management & Entrepreneurship, and Marketing.

== Research centres ==
The school's research centres and institutes include:

- Brevan Howard Centre for Financial Analysis – conducts research in financial economics.
- Centre for Climate Finance & Investment – researches climate finance and sustainable investment.
- Centre for Financial Technology – studies the role of technology in finance and society.
- Centre for Health Economics & Policy Innovation – analyses incentives and policy in healthcare.
- Centre for Responsible Leadership – researches leadership and organisational practice.
- Centre for Sectoral Economic Performance – studies economic performance and competitiveness in the UK economy.
- Gandhi Centre for Inclusive Innovation – researches inclusive innovation and its social impact.
- Imperial Centre of Excellence in Quantitative Finance – carries out research and teaching in quantitative finance.
- Imperial Strategic Design Studio – studies the role of design thinking in business strategy and performance.
- Leonardo Centre on Business for Society – researches sustainable and responsible business models.
- Institute for Deep Tech Entrepreneurship – supports the creation of ventures based on scientific research.

== Rankings and reputation ==
Business school rankings

Europe
- QS MBA: 8
- Financial Times MBA: 12

Global
- QS MBA: 19
- Financial Times MBA: 39

The school's reputation is closely linked to that of Imperial College London. In 2026, Imperial ranked 2nd in the world and 1st in Europe in the QS World University Rankings, and 8th in the world and 3rd in Europe in the Times Higher Education World University Rankings.

In the 2021 Research Excellence Framework (REF), the UK's national assessment of university research, the school ranked joint 2nd for the proportion of world-leading research in business and management studies.

In the 2026 QS Business Master's Rankings, its MSc in Marketing placed 7th in the world, Business Analytics 8th, Management 9th and Finance 14th.

In 2026, its MBA was ranked 8th in Europe by QS and 12th in Europe by the Financial Times. QS also ranks the MBA 1st in Europe and 3rd in the world for entrepreneurship.

In 2026, Imperial also ranked 1st in the UK for career prospects in The Times and The Sunday Times Good University Guide, the Guardian University Guide and the Complete University Guide.

== People ==
=== Directors and deans ===
- Sam Eilon (1955–1987)
- David Norburn (1987–2003)
- David Begg (2003–2012)
- Dorothy Griffiths (2012–2013)
- G. "Anand" Anandalingam (2013–2016)
- Nelson Phillips (acting, 2016–2017)
- Francisco Veloso (2017–2023)
- Franklin Allen (interim, 2023–2024)
- Peter Todd (2024–present)

=== Notable academic staff ===
- Franklin Allen, Professor of Finance, Executive Director of the Brevan Howard Centre for Financial Analysis
- Patrick Bolton, Professor of Finance, Research Director of the Centre for Climate Finance & Investment
- Jonathan Haskel, CBE, Professor of Economics
- David Miles, CBE, Professor of Financial Economics
- William Perraudin, economist (former Chair in Finance, now adjunct professor)
- Carol Propper, DBE, FBA, Chair in Economics
- Tommaso Valletti, Chair in Economics, former Chief Competition Economist of the European Commission
- Ramana Nanda, Professor of Entrepreneurial Finance
- David Shrier, Professor of Practice, AI & Innovation
- George Yip, Emeritus Professor of Marketing and Strategy
