= CIBC Mellon =

Canadian online brokerage

- Type: Joint venture
- Industry: Financial services
- Founded: 1996; 30 years ago, in Toronto, Ontario, Canada
- Headquarters: Toronto, Ontario, Canada
- Number of locations: 6 Offices (2009)
- Area served: Canada
- Key people: Mal Cullen (president and CEO); Daniel J. Smith (chairman)
- Services: Asset Servicing
- Owner: CIBC (50%); BNY Mellon (50%)
- Number of employees: 1,800
- Divisions: CIBC Mellon Trust Company (CMTC) and CIBC Mellon Global Securities Services Company (CMGSS)
- Website: cibcmellon.com
- Footnotes; CMTC and CMGSS are sister companies to each other

CIBC Mellon is a joint venture founded in 1996 between the Canadian Imperial Bank of Commerce (CIBC) and then Mellon Financial Corporation to offer asset servicing to institutional investors. Based in Toronto, Ontario, Canada, it comprises two sister companies, CIBC Mellon Trust Company (CMTC) and CIBC Mellon Global Securities Services Company (CMGSS).

On 16 February 2010, The Wall Street Journal reported that BNY Trust Co. of Canada would be acquiring the corporate trust assets of CIBC Mellon. On 28 July 2010 it was reported that Pacific Equity Partners would acquire CIBC Mellon Trust Company's issuer services business (stock transfer and employee share purchase plan).

CIBC Mellon's head office is in Toronto. There are satellite offices in various locations throughout Canada.

== History ==
CIBC Mellon was founded in 1996, after CIBC entered into a 50-50 joint venture with Mellon Financial Corporation in a 50-50 joint venture named CIBC Mellon Global Securities Services (CMGSS); the new company was designed to serve Canadian institutional investors with domestic and global assets, and also serve foreign financial institutions investing in Canada. The following year, 1997, CIBC also purchased a 50% stake in The R-M Trust Company from Mellon, and this became CMGSS's sister company, CIBC Mellon Trust Company (CMTC).

In 1997, CIBC Mellon acquired the Pension and Institutional Trust businesses from Canada Trust.

In 1999, the firm acquired the global custody business from the Bank of Montreal.

In 2002, CIBC Mellon acquired, from TD Financial Group, their third-party investment fund custody business.

In 2009, CIBC Mellon acquired the unit-holder record-keeping and fund administration business of Felcom Data Services Inc., a wholly owned subsidiary of Jovian Capital Corporation, for a purchase price of approximately C$4.2 million.

In November 2010, CIBC Mellon sold its issuer services business (stock transfer and employee share purchase plans) to Canadian Stock Transfer Company, Inc.

In November 2024, CIBC Mellon amalgamated its two component companies, CIBC Mellon Global Securities Services Company Inc. (CMGSS) and CIBC Mellon Trust Company (CMTC), into a single entity, CIBC Mellon Trust Company, in order to consolidate business functions and operate efficiently as a single company.

== Past presidents and CEOs ==
- Douglas Nowers, 1996–1998
- Thomas C. MacMillan, 1998–2009
- Thomas Monahan, 2009–2016
- Steven Wolff, 2017-2022

== Securities investigations ==
=== Pay Pop Inc. ===
In 1998, Alnoor Jiwan, a manager in CIBC Mellon's Vancouver office, was approached by Pay Pop Inc. and asked whether CIBC Mellon could issue Pay Pop Inc. shares without the required disclaimer which stated that the securities were not registered with the SEC. This was a pump-and-dump scheme by Pay Pop and the brokerage.

Jiwan knew that the securities were not registered, but agreed to act as the transfer agent to issue the stock certificates in return for 820,000 Pay Pop shares. The SEC subsequently cited CIBC Mellon for acting as an unregistered broker and transfer agent, and for offering to sell unregistered securities. Jiwan was subsequently terminated for cause from CIBC Mellon, following the company's discovery of the transactions, and simultaneously ceasing all dealings with Pay Pop Inc.

CMTC agreed to pay a civil monetary penalty of US$5 million and disgorgement of $889,773 and prejudgment interest of $140,270. CMTC was also permanently enjoined from prescribed violations of Securities Act Section 5, Exchange Act Section 10(b) and Rule 10b-5, Exchange Act Section 15(a), Exchange Act Section 17A(c)(1), and from aiding and abetting future violations of Exchange Act Section 10(b) or Rule 10b-5.

Payment was made on March 4, 2005. CMTC also consented, without admitting or denying the SEC complaint's allegations, to the entry of an SEC administrative order based on the final judgment on March 2, 2005. Pursuant to the order, CMTC was censured and agreed to an undertaking to engage an independent consultant to review its relevant businesses and procedures.

=== Privacy breach ===
In 2004, a long-term employee of CIBC Mellon was terminated, after it had been discovered that they had been disclosing institutional holdings in certain companies to unidentified parties in return for gifts. It was reported that the employee had received hockey and baseball tickets as well as up to $100 in cash for tips on big investors who owned specific stocks.

The disclosures were discovered when a temporary worker received a request for data through an email. The subsequent investigation, which included reviewing phone and email records, discovered that the employee had been disclosing information for years.

=== Related party transactions with Enron ===
In 2003, CIBC paid out $80 million in charges for complicity with its involvement with Enron. While the involvement was not related to CIBC Mellon, as CIBC is a majority stakeholder, it was required that it be reported on the TA-1 to the SEC.
