= List of Selwyn House School people =

This list contains people associated with the Selwyn House School in Westmount, Quebec, Canada, including current and former headmasters, as well as notable alumni and faculty.

== Notable alumni ==
- John Aimers (1951-), founder of the Monarchist League of Canada
- Joel Anthony (1982-), former basketball player and two-time champion
- Eldon Pattyson Black (1925-1999), diplomat
- Charles Bronfman (1931-), businessman
- Edgar Bronfman Sr. (1929-2013), businessman
- Edward Bronfman (1927-2005), businessman
- Peter Bronfman (1929-1996), businessman
- John Caird (1948-), stage director and playwright
- Arthur Grant Campbell (1916-1996), diplomat
- Egan Chambers (1921-1994), politician and Progressive Conservative MP (1958–62)
- Michel Choquette (1938-), humourist
- James Campbell Clouston (1900-1940), military officer
- David Culver (1924-2017), businessman
- Andre Desmarais (1956-), businessman
- Olivier Desmarais (1982-), businessman
- James de Beaujeu Domville (1933-2015), theatre producer and administrator
- Charles Drury (1912-1991), politician and Liberal MP (1962–78)
- Jonathan Emile (1986-), hip-hop artist
- Angelo Esposito (1989-), hockey player (SG Cortina)
- Greg Fergus (1969-), politician and Liberal MP (2015-) and 38th Speaker of the House of Commons (2023-2025)
- Tim Fleiszer (1975-), football player
- Robert Fowler (1944-), diplomat
- John Glassco (1909-1981), writer
- Michael Goldbloom (1953-), lawyer, publisher and academic administrator
- Richard Goldbloom (1924-2021), pediatrician and university professor
- Victor Goldbloom (1923-2016), pediatrician and Liberal politician
- Vincenzo Guzzo (1969-), businessman
- Conrad Harrington (1912-2000), lawyer and Chancellor of McGill University (1976–1983)
- Richard Iton (1961-2013), professor
- Jonathan Kay (1968-), journalist
- Stephen Leopold (1951-), real estate entrepreneur
- Tiff Macklem (1961-), banker and current Governor of the Bank of Canada
- George Carlyle Marler (1901-1981), politician and Liberal MP (1954–58)
- John McCallum (1950-2025), economist, Liberal MP (2000-2017) and former Canadian ambassador to China (2017-2019)
- Michael Meighen (1939-), lawyer, Progressive Conservative senator (1990-2012) and Chancellor of McGill University (2014-2021)
- John Campbell Merrett (1909-1998), architect
- Torrey Mitchell (1985-), hockey player (Montreal Canadiens)
- Eric Molson (1937-), businessman
- Geoff Molson (1971-), businessman
- Hartland Molson (1907-2002), brewer and senator (1955-1993)
- Mark Molson (1949-2006), bridge player
- Robert Moncel (1917-2007), military general
- Alex Moore (1997-), wrestler
- Mark Pathy (1969-), businessman and private astronaut
- Michael D. Penner (1969-), lawyer and businessman
- Tom Pitfield, senator
- Timothy Porteous (1933-2020), administrator
- Jacob Richler, journalist and restaurant critic
- Jeff Russel (1900-1926), football player
- Hazen Sise (1906-1974), architect
- Devon Soltendieck (1985-), television news reporter
- Tiga Sontag (1974-), electronic music producer
- John Kennett Starnes (1918-2014), diplomat
- Donald Steven (1945-), composer
- Charles Taylor (1931-), philosopher
- Ralph C. S. Walker (1944-), philosopher

== Notable faculty ==
- Patrick Anderson (1915-1979), poet
- Edward O. Phillips (1931-2020), author
- Alexis S. Troubetzkoy (1934-2017), author and former headmaster
