= Jeffrey Russell =

Jeffrey Russell may refer to:

- Jeffrey Burton Russell (b.1934), American historian of religion
- Jeff Russell (b. 1961), American Major League Baseball pitcher
- Jeff Russel (1900–1926), Canadian football player
- Geoffrey Russell, 4th Baron Ampthill (1921–2011) British peer and businessman
