= Miss Edgar's and Miss Cramp's School =

Coordinates: 45°29′28″N 73°35′48″W

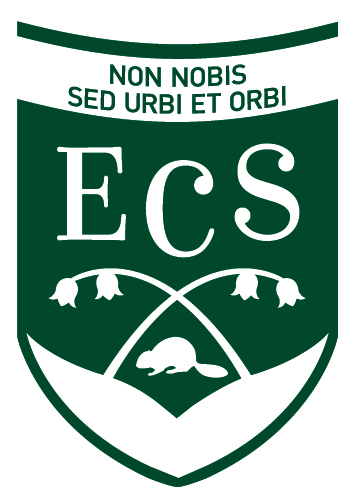

Location
- 525 Mount Pleasant Avenue; Westmount, Quebec, Canada

Information
- School type: Independent day school
- Motto: Non Nobis Sed Urbi Et Orbi (Latin for 'Not for ourselves alone, but for the city and the world')
- Founded: 1909; 117 years ago
- Head of School: Alison Wearing
- Grades: Kindergarten – Grade 12
- Gender: Girls
- Enrollment: 300
- Language: English and French
- Colours: Green and White
- Website: www.ecs.qc.ca

Miss Edgar's and Miss Cramp's School (ECS) is an independent school for girls that is located in Westmount, Quebec. It is situated near other QAIS schools, including Selwyn House School and The Study. The school teaches students from Kindergarten up to Grade 12.

The annual tuition fees for attending the school range from $25,200 to $30,765. Miss Edgar's and Miss Cramp's School became fully independent in September 2025, no longer requiring certificates of eligibility.

== History ==
Miss Edgar's and Miss Cramp's School was founded in 1909 by Maud Edgar and Mary Cramp. Maud Edgar, who served as the headmistress, was the daughter of the historian and feminist Matilda Ridout Edgar and the lawyer and politician James David Edgar. The school has always been an all-girls school and began its life in a home on Guy Street in Downtown Montreal. There were 70 girls at the outset, including 15 boarders. The school's initial goals were to equip their pupils with a broad understanding of literature, languages, ethics, fine arts, as well as science and mathematics. The most novel feature of the curriculum was the organization of literature and history.

Forty years later, the school relocated to a building on Cedar Avenue, on the slope of Mount Royal. By then there were approximately 150 girls attending, which included 17 boarders. The school continued to grow in size for another 16 years, and after observing a larger property at the corner of Mount Pleasant and Montrose Avenue in 1964, the school undertook a major fundraising campaign to make the move possible. The official opening took place in November 1964. At that point, ECS became a dedicated day school.

Today, the school is located at 525 Mount Pleasant Avenue, the property bought in 1964. The school's motto is Non Nobis Sed Urbi Et Orbi, which translates from Latin to English as "not for ourselves alone, but for the city and the world". The school anthem was written by Isabelle Adami.

== School organization ==
ECS is divided into three "schools": junior school (K-grade 6), middle school (grade 7-grade 8), senior school (grade 9 - grade 11) and Pre-University. Students also belong to one of three Houses: Edgar, Cramp or Adami.

== Entrepreneurial Platform (EP) ==
ECS's Entrepreneurial Platform (EP) is a signature program that teaches students, starting from Kindergarten, to identify challenges and develop solutions with an entrepreneurial mindset. Projects are aligned with the United Nations Sustainable Development Goals (SDGs), relating to issues such as poverty, inequality, and climate change.

== Music ==
ECS has both vocal and instrumental extra-curricular activities. Open to middle and senior school students are: Vocal Jazz, Senior Choir, Junior Jazz Band, Senior Jazz Band and Symphonic Ensemble. For the junior students there is a junior choir and an annual junior school musical in addition to their regular music classes.

== Athletics ==
ECS actively participates in friendly competition for sports. They have a soccer, rugby, basketball, swimming, badminton, curling, golf, tennis, football, track and field, halo, cross country, squash, ski, hockey team and others. ECS is an elite athletic school.

== Notable alumni ==
- Gretta Chambers, journalist and former Chancellor of McGill University
- Carole Corbeil, art critic and author
- Bianca Farella, rugby player
- Jessica Mulroney, fashion stylist
- Myfanwy Pavelic, portrait artist
- Barbara Pentland, composer
- Lilias Torrance Newton, painter
- Hannah Rose Dalton, fashion designer
