= Arthur Grant Campbell =

Canadian diplomat

Arthur Grant Campbell (1916 – July 17, 1996) was a Canadian diplomat. He held diplomatic posts throughout the world, including Botswana, Lesotho, South Africa, Swaziland, Norway, and Iceland.

== Education and Second World War ==
Campbell studied at Selwyn House School in Montreal and Upper Canada College in Toronto before receiving his Bachelor of Arts at McGill University in 1938. He began his working career in 1938, working as an assistant to the secretary of the Canadian Chamber of Commerce. He served with the Canadian Army between 1941 and 1946 during World War II. Campbell served in the United Kingdom, Central Mediterranean, and Northwest Europe. After World War II Campbell joined the United Nations Secretariat.

== Foreign service ==
Campbell joined the United Nations division of the Department of External Affairs in 1956 and thereafter was appointed to various other diplomatic positions. He served as the Canadian High Commission to Botswana, Lesotho, and Swaziland between 1972 and 1976, and as Ambassador to South Africa between 1972 and 1976, and Norway and Iceland between 1977 and 1981.

== Personal life ==
In 1940, Campbell married Carol Wright. They had a son, Ian.

== Death ==
According to ancestry.com, Campbell died on July 17, 1996.
