= Richard Iton =

- Born: September 14, 1961; Montreal, Quebec, Canada
- Died: April 21, 2013 (aged 51)
- Occupation: Professor

Academic background
- Education: McGill University (BA, MA); Johns Hopkins University Phd

Academic work
- Discipline: African American studies
- Institutions: Northwestern University

Richard Iton (September 14, 1961 – April 21, 2013) was a professor of African American studies at Northwestern University, known for his work on the ways black popular culture forged community and affected politics.

Born in Montreal, Quebec, Iton attended Selwyn House School, Marianopolis College and McGill University (BA and MA). He obtained his PhD at Johns Hopkins University in 1994 and taught at the University of Toronto before joining the political science department at Northwestern.

Iton's first book, Solidarity Blues: Race, Culture and the American Left, won the Gustavus Meyer Outstanding Book Award in 2000. He is best known for his book In Search of the Black Fantastic: Politics and Popular Culture in the Post-Civil Rights Era (Oxford University Press, 2008), which won the Ralph Bunche Award of the American Political Science Association. He was working on a third book at the time of his death of leukemia.
