= Conrad Harrington =

Canadian lawyer and businessman (1912-2000)

- Born: 8 August 1912 (age 114); Montreal, Quebec
- Died: 12 May 2000 (aged 87); Montreal, Quebec
- Education: Trinity College School ('30); McGill University (BA 1933, BCL 1936)
- Spouse: Joan Roy Hastings (m. 1940)
- Military career
- Allegiance: Canada
- Branch: Canadian Army
- Service years: 1940–1951
- Rank: Major
- Unit: Royal Regiment of Canadian Artillery
- Conflicts: World War II

Conrad Fetherstonhaugh Harrington CM CD (8 August 1912 – 12 May 2000) was a Canadian lawyer, businessman, and Chancellor of McGill University from 1976 to 1983.

== Life and career ==
Conrad Fetherstonhaugh Harrington was born in Montreal on 8 August 1912 to Conrad Dawson Harrington and Muriel Theodora Fetherstonhaugh. His father's maternal grandfather was John William Dawson, the former principal of McGill University. He was educated at Selwyn House School and Trinity College School in Port Hope, Ontario. He received his Bachelor of Arts degree in 1933, and his Bachelor of Civil Law degree in 1936 from McGill University. He was a member of Zeta Psi. He was called to the Quebec Bar in 1936. After spending a year studying in France, he practiced law in Montreal.

From 1940 to 1945, he fought in World War II with the Royal Canadian Artillery. After the war, he joined the Royal Trust Company, becoming Executive Vice-President in 1964. In 1965, he was elected to the board of directors of the Royal Trust Company of Canada.

In 1984, he was awarded an honorary LLD from McGill University. In 1986, he was made a Member of the Order of Canada.

Academic offices
Preceded by Stuart Milner Finlayson	Chancellor of McGill University; 1976–1984	Succeeded by A. Jean de Grandpré
