= Eldon Pattyson Black =

Eldon Pattyson (Pat) Black (15 October 1925 – 3 November 1999) was a Canadian diplomat.

Black was educated at Selwyn House School and studied law at McGill University.

In 1967, Black was appointed minister (second-in-command) to the Embassy of Canada in France. Canada–France relations were tense following Charles de Gaulle's Vive le Québec libre speech and, in 1969, Black was accused of interfering in French national elections. Years later, in 1996, Black published a book entitled Direct Intervention: Canada–France Relations, 1967–1974 (ISBN 0886292891). Graham Fraser, in a review published in the International Journal, praised it as "a valuable account, clear and detailed in its description of the challenge Canadian diplomats faced in dealing, day-to-day, with an ally whose government had taken a decisively hostile position on the central question of Canada's future."

Black returned to Canada, where he took a position as a Department of External Affairs Foreign Service Officer working in foreign intelligence. In 1978 Don Jamieson, Minister of External Affairs, asked Black to fill a new deputy under-secretary position in his department to deal with the increasing threat of terrorism.

In 1985 he was appointed as Ambassador Extraordinary and Plenipotentiary to the Holy See. Prior to that appointment he had been chargé d'affaires in Cairo.

Diplomatic posts
Preceded by Pierre Dumas	Ambassador Extraordinary and Plenipotentiary to the Holy See; 1985-1989	Succeeded by Théodore Arcand
