= James Anthony Harris =

British philosopher

James Anthony Harris FRSE
- Born: 1968 (age 57–58)

Education
- Education: University of Oxford (PhD)
- Doctoral advisor: Galen Strawson; Ralph C. S. Walker
- Other advisor: David Wiggins

Philosophical work
- Era: Contemporary philosophy
- Region: Western philosophy
- School: Analytic philosophy
- Institutions: University of St Andrews
- Main interests: History of British philosophy

James Anthony Harris (born 1968) is a British philosopher and professor of the history of philosophy at the University of St Andrews. He is known for his works on the history of British philosophy and, in particular, on the philosophy of David Hume.

== Philosophical work ==
Harris has written the most recent intellectual biography of David Hume. His short Hume: A Very Short Introduction (2021) has superseded the previous Oxford short introduction on the same topic written by British philosopher A. J. Ayer (1980). Unlike Ayer's introduction, Harris' work focuses on morality, religion, and politics in Hume.

== Awards and recognitions ==
In 2019, Harris was elected a Fellow of the Royal Society of Edinburgh. Harris gave the Benedict Lectures in the History of Political Philosophy at Brown University in 2018 and the British Society for the History of Philosophy Annual Lecture in 2021.

== Monographic studies ==
- James A. Harris, Of Liberty and Necessity: The Free Will Debate in Eighteenth-Century British Philosophy, Oxford University Press, 2005, ISBN 0199268606.
- James A. Harris, Hume: An Intellectual Biography, Cambridge University Press, 2015, ISBN 9780521837255.
- James A. Harris, Hume: A Very Short Introduction, Oxford University Press, 2021, ISBN 9780191884160.

== Edited volumes ==
- Reid, Thomas. Essays on the Intellectual Powers of Man. Edited by Knud Haakonssen and James A. Harris. Edinburgh: Edinburgh University Press, 2002.
- James A. Harris (ed.), The Oxford Handbook of British Philosophy in the Eighteenth Century, Oxford University Press, 2013, ISBN 9780199549023.
- Aaron Garrett and James A. Harris (eds.), Scottish Philosophy in the Eighteenth Century, Volume I: Morals, Politics, Art, Religion, Oxford University Press, 2015, 482pp., ISBN 9780199560677.
