= Maher Bitar =

US government official

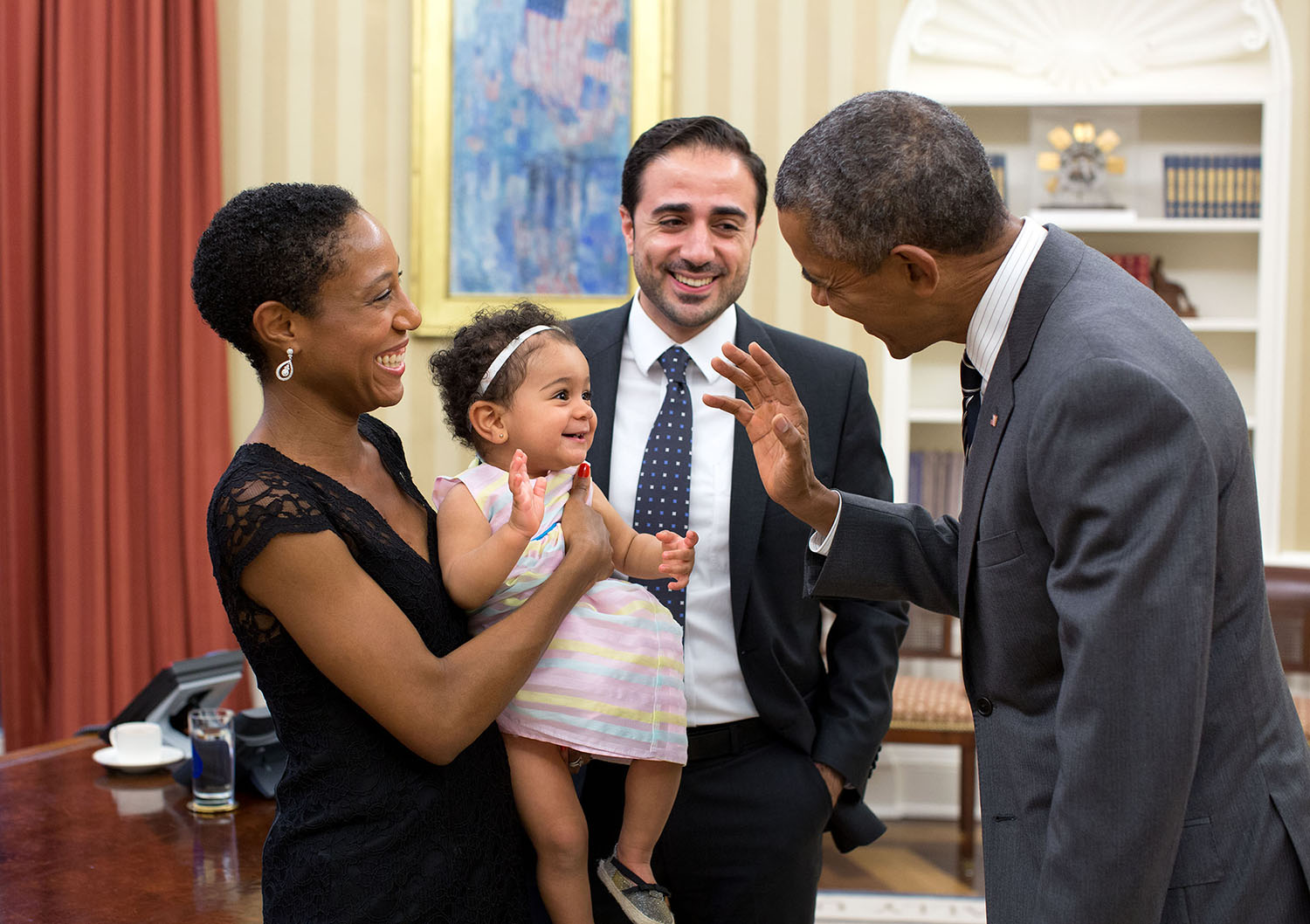
- Maher and his family with Barack Obama, 2015
- Born: 1984 or 1985 (age 41–42)
- Education: Georgetown University (BS, JD); St Antony's College, Oxford (MS)
- Political party: Democratic

Maher B. S. Bitar (born 1984/1985) is an American government official who worked in the administrations of U.S. presidents Barack Obama and Joe Biden.

== Early life ==
Bitar grew up in Montreal, Canada, graduating from Lower Canada College in 2002. In 2006, Bitar graduated from the School of Foreign Service at Georgetown University, where he was on the executive board of the school's Students for Justice in Palestine. Bitar was a Marshall Scholar at the University of Oxford, where he received a master's in forced migration from the Refugee Studies Centre and studied toward a doctorate from the Department of Politics and International Relations. He initially planned to go on for a second master's in violence in conflict and development from the School of Oriental and African Studies at the University of London. He then studied at Georgetown Law School. He has written about political organizing among Palestinian refugees. His family is of Palestinian origin.

== Career ==
Bitar worked at the United Nations High Commissioner for Refugees (UNHCR) in Malaysia and the United Nations Relief and Works Agency (UNRWA) in Jerusalem.

=== Obama Administration ===
Bitar is a career Department of State employee. At the State Department, Bihar developed a close relationship with Jake Sullivan. During the Obama Administration, Bitar worked at the National Security Council (NSC) as Director for Israel and Palestinian Affairs from 2013 to 2015. From 2015 to 2017, he was Deputy to U.S. Permanent Representative to the United Nations Samantha Power

In 2017, Bitar joined the House Intelligence Committee as general counsel for the Democrats, where he played a role in the first impeachment of Donald Trump. He was also legal counsel to U.S. Representative Adam Schiff.

=== Biden Administration ===
At the beginning of the Biden Administration in January 2021, Bitar was appointed Special Assistant to the President and Senior Director for Intelligence Programs at the NSC, succeeding Michael Ellis. His appointment was praised by Rob Malley and Ziad Asali of the pro-Palestinian group American Task Force on Palestine.

In January 2024, National Security Advisor Jake Sullivan moved Bitar into a new role at the NSC as Deputy Assistant to the President and coordinator for intelligence and defense policy. Bitar is the highest-ranking official at the White House responsible for coordinating the U.S. government's intelligence and defense policy.
