= My Fur Lady =

My Fur Lady is a satirical musical theatre production, first staged in Canada in the 1950s. Directed by Brian Macdonald, it was premiered in Montreal on February 7, 1957, by McGill University students. A revue, it tells the story of Princess Aurora Borealis (the contralto Ann Golden) of "Mukluko" ("near" Baffin Island) who is searching for a husband, to help keep her country independent from Canada. The music combined elements of 1940s tunes, the contemporary 1950s rock and roll era and a degree of jazz, while the lyrics reflected the political events of the times.

It was co-written and produced by James de Beaujeu Domville, Timothy Porteous, Donald MacSween, Galt MacDermot, Harry Garber and Roy Wolvin. Later in 1957 the production played at the Stratford Festival, and toured Canada during the rest of the year and into 1958. 402 performances were given, across 82 locations. An original cast recording was made in June 1957.

James Domville, producer, was 25 years later head of the National Film Board, Brian MacDonald was choreographer of Les Grands Ballets Canadiens, Timothy Porteous was chairman of the Canada Council, James Hugessen, male lead, was Associate Chief Justice of the Quebec Superior Court and librettist Donald MacSween was director of the National Arts Centre in Ottawa.

== Synopsis ==
The show starts off with Mukluko (located near Baffin Island)'s Eskimo citizens celebrating the cash they made by overcharging the constructors of the D.E.W. (distant early warning) line. Their celebration, however, is interrupted by Princess Aurora Borealis (played by Ann Golden), who is searching for a husband in order to keep her country independent from Canada. She is then sent south to find a husband in Canada ("Into a New World").

Upon her arrival in Canada, Princess Aurora meets Rex Hammerstein (played by Jim Hugessen), a reporter for the True Canadian Romances Magazine. When Rex hears that Princess Aurora is an immigrant, he proposes to take her on a national tour. Aurora agrees, knowing that this would be a good way to find a husband, and instructs Rex about how to think like a Canadian citizen would ("Teach Me How to Think Canadian").

The Canadian government tour in Ottawa begins with a visit to the Governor General (played by Wilfred Hastings), who sings about attending to his generalities ("Governor Generalities"). Culturally speaking, he instructs his Culturality Squad (played by Elizabeth Heseltine, David Langstroth, and Donald Harvie) to take the Princess in hand. They talk about their objective, which is to disseminate the nation ("Canadiana").

The Governor General's secretary, Lilli Brogida (played by Nancy Bacal) talks of her annoyance for preferring culture to a more informal relationship ("Honey Don't Be Highbrow"). Meanwhile, in the Governor General's office, Rex discovers his old fiancée, Constable Renfrew (played by July Tarlo) of the RCMP, whose current job is to guard the Governor-General. Rex and Constable describe their mutual feelings ("We Hate Each Other").

After visiting the Department of National Defence, the Princess's tour of the Canadian government culminates with the opening of Parliament, where she hears the members debating the issues with the official Canadian flag. The members, led by the Minister of Supply and Demand (played by John MacLeod), finally make their decision to leave the solution to Louis St. Laurent, the Prime Minister of Canada at the time ("...And Howe!").

Act II starts off with a public student meeting, whose occupants explain about the coming week ("Next Week Is Work Week"). After listening to a rant about Canadian poetry, Princess Aurora is taken to the Kappa Kappa Kappa female organization, where the girls from the women's residents teach her a dance ("Royal Victoria Rag").

The Princess's tour of the Canadian government ends at the Governor General's annual Protocol Ball, which takes place at the evening of her 21st birthday. The Governor General's butler, Lilli and Morton (played by John MacLeod), make their observations about society ("Society Gets Higher Every Year"). Following their presentations, the debutantes pay tribute to the source of their high life ("The Debutantes' So-Glad-You-Can-Pay-For-Me-Dad Waltz"). Suddenly, decorum is brought to a conclusion with a frantic rock-'n'-roll scene ("Eulogy to Elvis"), which suddenly gets interrupted by the arrival of a member of the Quebec Censorship Board (played by Donald Harvie), who hereby declares that the eulogy has become obscene, and decides that he must snip it ("Snip").

Not having paid duty to the vulgarity of contemporary 1950's music, the Princess finds refuge in the Governor General's company, and the two fall in love with each other. The Ball ends with the Princess in the arms of the Governor General ("I'm for Love").

Back north in Mukluko, preparations made by its citizens and the Canadian Delegation for the union ceremony between the two countries was unexpectedly interrupted by the arrival of the Governor General's party, and the announcement of His Excellence's marriage to Princess Aurora. This ceremony of political union is converted to a ceremony of matrimonial union. The curtains close with a romantic, patriotic finale.
