= A. Jean de Grandpré =

Canadian lawyer (1921–2022)

A. Jean de Grandpré CC QC

15th Chancellor of McGill University
- In office 1984–1991

Personal details
- Born: 14 September 1921 Montreal, Quebec, Canada
- Died: 24 July 2022 (aged 100)
- Spouse: Hélène Choquet (m. 1947)
- Relations: Louis-Philippe de Grandpré (brother); Pierre de Grandpré (brother)
- Education: Collège Jean-de-Brébeuf (BA 1940); McGill University (BCL 1943)

Albert Jean de Grandpré CC QC (14 September 1921 – 31 July 2022) was a Canadian lawyer and businessman who served as the president and chief executive officer of Bell Canada Enterprises Inc.

== Life and career ==
Born in Montreal, Quebec, he was educated at Collège Jean-de-Brébeuf and received a Bachelor of Civil Law (BCL) from McGill University in 1943. He joined Bell Canada as a general counsel in 1966 and was made president in 1973. He became chairman and CEO in 1976 and was the first chairman and CEO when the BCE holding company was created in 1983. The advantage of this arrangement was that only the telecommunications subsidiary Bell Canada was subject to regulation by the Canadian Radio-television and Telecommunications Commission (CRTC), whereas the parent company with its other assets (such as the telecom manufacturer Northern Telecom, later Nortel) was not.

He retired from the company in 1989. From 1984 until 1991, he was the fifteenth Chancellor of McGill University. Since 1996, he has been chairman of the board of Theratechnologies, a Canadian biopharmaceutical company.

Grandpré turned 100 in September 2021, and died on 31 July 2022.

== Honours and awards ==
In 1981, he was made an Officer of the Order of Canada. He was promoted to Companion in 1987.

Grandpré has received honorary doctorates from the University of Quebec (1979), McGill University (1981), Université de Montréal (1989), the University of Ottawa (1982), and Bishop's University (1983).

Academic offices
Preceded by Conrad Harrington	Chancellor of McGill University; 1984–1991	Succeeded by Gretta Chambers
