= Myfanwy Pavelic =

Canadian artist (1916–2007)

- Born: Myfanwy Spencer; April 27, 1916; Victoria, British Columbia, Canada
- Died: May 7, 2007 (aged 91); Victoria, British Columbia, Canada
- Education: Privately by Emily Carr
- Known for: Painter
- Notable work: "Katharine Hepburn", "Prime Minister Pierre Elliott Trudeau"
- Spouse: Niki Pavelic
- Awards: Order of Canada; Order of British Columbia; Canadian Portrait Academy

Myfanwy Pavelic, CM OBC RCA CPA DFA (née Spencer, April 27, 1916 – May 7, 2007) was a Canadian portrait artist.

== Early life and career ==
Born in Victoria, British Columbia to an upper-class family, her first interests in fine art came after meeting with Emily Carr on Vancouver Island who later gave a brief series of instruction to Pavelic. Aside from a few months of study with a Yugoslav artist, she was self-taught as a painter. She studied at Miss Edgar's and Miss Cramp's School in Montreal, Canada as a boarder. During the Second World War, she held a solo exhibition of portraits in Canada and donated the proceeds to the Red Cross. She later married a diplomat and had one daughter who suffered a disability.

Pavelic was one of few Canadian artists who had their work shown at the National Portrait Gallery, where her portrait of Yehudi Menuhin was displayed. She later donated the portrait of her friend to the National Portrait Gallery in London, making her the first known Canadian-born artist to be represented in their permanent collection.

Pavelic's childhood home was donated to the City of Victoria and converted into the art gallery.

== Awards and honours ==
In 1984, she was made a Member of the Order of Canada. In 1984 she received an Honorary Doctorate from the University of Victoria and awarded the Order of Canada. In 2001, she was made a Member of the Order of British Columbia.

In 1997, she became a founding member of the Canadian Portrait Academy (CPA) and in 1998, won the F.H. Varley Medallion for Best Portrait Painting for her portrait of Pierre Elliott Trudeau, the medallion sculpted by her friend Christian Cardell Corbet. She was made a member of the Royal Canadian Academy of Arts.

== Selected exhibitions ==
- Collages: Myfanwy Pavelici, Art Gallery of Greater Victoria, Victoria, British Columbia, 1976
- Variations on the Figure, Utley Gallery, Victoria, British Columbia, 1977
- For Yehudi Menuhiin, Maltwood Art Gallery and Museum, University of Victoria, Victoria, British Columbia, 1983
- Yehudi Menuhin, Barbican Centre, London, England, 1985
- Relationships, North Park Gallery, Victoria, British Columbia, 1985
- Smalls, North Park Gallery, Victoria, British Columbia, 1985
- Altered Ego, Women in Focus Gallery, Vancouver, British Columbia, 1986
- Trudeau, Maltwood Art Museum and Gallery, University of Victoria, Victoria, British Columbia, 1992
- Myfanwy Pavelic: Inner Explorations, Art Gallery of Greater Victoria, British Columbia, 1994
