= John Aimers =

Founder of the Monarchist League of Canada (born 1951)

- Born: John Lathrop Aimers; 1951 (age 74–75); Dublin, Ireland
- Education: Sir George Williams University; McGill University
- Occupation: Schoolteacher
- Known for: Founding the Monarchist League of Canada
- Political party: Progressive Conservative Party of Canada (until 1978)

John Lathrop Aimers (born 1951 in Dublin, Ireland) is the founder of the Monarchist League of Canada, who served as its first Dominion Chairman. He is an educator by profession and taught at a succession of private schools until 2006, when he was accused of sexual misconduct involving students. He is a dual citizen of Canada and the United States.

== Education ==
The son of an architect, Aimers was educated at Selwyn House and Lower Canada College before attending Sir George Williams University where he earned a Bachelor of Arts in political science and McGill University where he earned a Bachelor of Education.

== Teaching career ==
He returned to Selwyn House in 1974, teaching English, history and political science and coaching the debating team until he left in 1978. He subsequently taught at a series of private schools across Canada and the United States, including Toronto French School where he taught English from 1998 until 2006.

== Founding the Monarchist League ==
Aimers had been an activist in the Progressive Conservative Party of Canada's youth wing and became personally close to former Prime Minister John Diefenbaker, serving as his administrative assistant for two summers 1969 to 1970. The two shared a conviction that the government of Pierre Trudeau was undermining the status of the monarchy in Canada. In 1970, while a university student, Aimers and others founded the Monarchist League of Canada in an attempt to galvanize monarchists and shore up support for the institution.

Aimers served as its Dominion Chairman from 1970 to 1972 when he left to take a job on Parliament Hill. He resumed his duties as Dominion Chairman in 1975, and led the league until February 4, 2006, when he resigned.

== Political activities ==
Following his service to Diefenbaker, Aimers worked as administrative assistant to Progressive Conservative Members of Parliament Robert Coates in 1972 and Stanley Schumacher in 1973. He served as national president of the Progressive Conservative Youth Federation in 1977. Aimers resigned from the Progressive Conservative Party in 1978, joining the Liberals, to protest what he called "the shafting of Stan Schumacher" by the party. Schumacher, a 10-year veteran Member of Parliament lost his bid for renomination after he refused to give up his Bow River riding in favour of PC leader Joe Clark who was losing his own riding due to redistribution. Aimers accused the party's national executive of directing a campaign against Schumacher's renomination bid in order to punish him.

== Anglicanism ==
As a member of the Anglican Church of Canada and the Prayer Book Society of Canada, Aimers spoke regularly at services and was long the newsletter editor at St. Thomas Anglican Church, an Anglo-Catholic parish in Toronto, until he resigned in 2006.

== Sexual abuse lawsuit ==
In 2009, Aimers's former employer, Selwyn House, settled a class action lawsuit, which had been launched in 2006, agreeing to pay up to $5 million in damages to nearly three dozen men who claimed that they had been sexually abused between 1961 and 1991 by three former teachers – Aimers (who had taught at the school in the 1970s and coached its debating team), Leigh Seville and James P. Hill. As part of the settlement, the school issued a public statement which expressed "apologies and regrets to former students who have presented claims asserting any form of sexual abuse during their time at the school."

He had been accused of making sexual advances to students while giving them drugs and alcohol, including one whom he hired as a clerk at the Monarchist League. Aimers denied any wrongdoing but resigned as Monarchist League chairman and signed the settlement agreement that concluded the lawsuit.

== Honours ==
The International Independent Schools' Public Speaking Championship formerly awarded the John Aimers Trophy to its highest-ranking American competitor, however, the trophy is no longer listed amongst its awards.
