= John Kennett Starnes =

Canadian civil servant, diplomat, and novelist

Canadian Ambassador to the Federal Republic of Germany
- Preceded by: Escott Reid
- Succeeded by: Richard Plant Bower

Canadian Ambassador to Egypt
- Preceded by: Jean Chapdelaine
- Succeeded by: Thomas Lemesurier Carter

Canadian Ambassador to Sudan
- Preceded by: Jean Chapdelaine
- Succeeded by: Thomas Lemesurier Carter

Personal details
- Born: February 5, 1918 Montreal, Quebec
- Died: December 23, 2014 (aged 96) Halifax, Nova Scotia

John Kennett Starnes (February 5, 1918 – December 23, 2014) was a Canadian civil servant, diplomat, and novelist.

Born in Montreal, Quebec to Henry Kennett Starnes and his wife, Altha Ella (née McCrea), Starnes was educated at Selwyn House School, Trinity College School, the Institute Sillig in Switzerland, the Ludwig-Maximilians-Universität München, and Bishop's University where he received a Bachelor of Arts degree. During World War II, he served with the Black Watch, the Canadian Intelligence Corps (1941), the Canadian War Staff College (1942), and the 21st Army Group in the United Kingdom. He was discharged in 1944 with the rank of captain.

After the War, Starnes joined the Public Service of Canada in the Department of External Affairs, where he served from 1944 to 1970. He and his wife, fellow Montrealer Helen Gordon (née Robinson), began their diplomatic service abroad at the Canadian Embassy in Bonn from 1953 and from 1956 to 1958 at the NATO secretariat in Paris. The same year, the pair returned to Ottawa, with Mr. Starnes again working in intelligence for External Affairs.

He was appointed Canadian Ambassador to the Federal Republic of Germany from 1962 to 1966 and Ambassador to Egypt and Sudan from 1966 to 1967, when he oversaw the withdrawal of the Canadian contingent of the UN Emergency Force set up after the Suez Crisis. From 1967 to 1970, he was Under-Secretary of State for External Affairs. He resigned from the Public Service in 1970 and was appointed Director General, Security and Intelligence Directorate for the Royal Canadian Mounted Police. During his tenure as Director General of the Security Service, Starnes resisted efforts by the Prime Minister's Office to collect intelligence on the Quebec separatist movement, as Starnes saw that as a politicization of his organization. He retired in 1973.

He is the author of Deep Sleepers (1981), Scarab (1982), Orion's Belt (1983), The Cornish Hug (1985), and Latonya (1994). His memoir, Closely Guarded: A Life in Canadian Security and Intelligence was published by the University of Toronto Press in 1998. His sons are Colin Starnes and Patrick Starnes.
