= Jeff Russel =

Canadian football player (1900–1926)

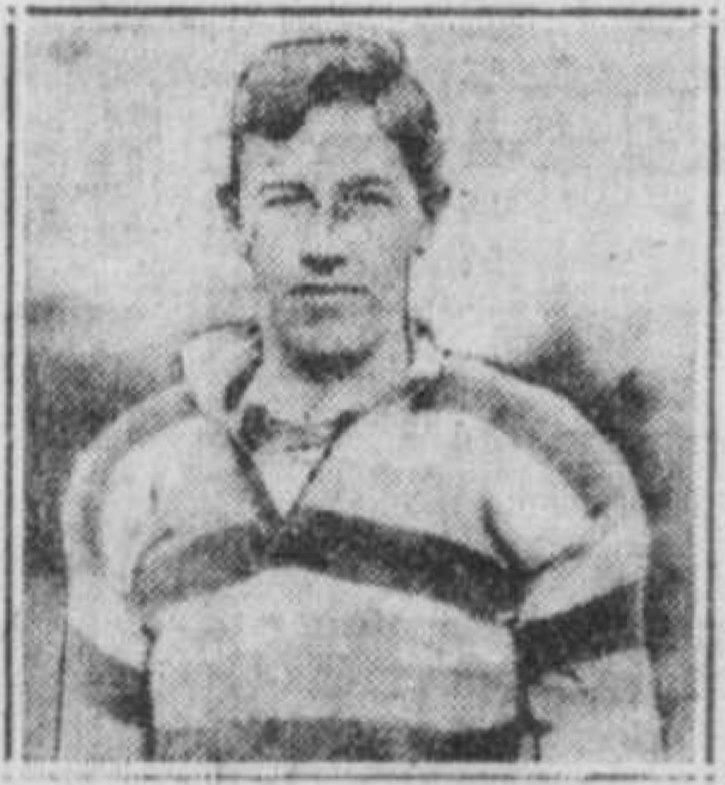

Profile
- Position: Halfback

Personal information
- Born: October 27, 1900; Ouray, Colorado, U.S.
- Died: May 3, 1926 (aged 25); Montreal, Quebec, Canada

Career information
- College: RMC / McGill

Career history
- 1917–1920: RMC Redmen
- 1920–1922: McGill University
- 1922–1925: Montreal AAA Winged Wheelers

Awards and highlights
- Canada's Sports Hall of Fame (1975)
- Canadian Football Hall of Fame (Class of 1963)

Jeffrey Cameron Russel (October 27, 1900 – May 3, 1926) was a Canadian football player remembered as a star with the Montreal AAA Winged Wheelers and his early accidental death.

== Life and career ==
Russel was born October 27, 1900, in Ouray, Colorado, where his father Hugh Yelverton "Bert" Russel, a graduate of McGill University in mining engineering and a former amateur hockey and football player, was managing a mine. The family returned to Montreal in 1909 where Jeff was attended Selwyn House School and Lower Canada College and participated in athletics. In 1917, he enrolled at the Royal Military College in Kingston, Ontario and became a halfback for the RMC Redmen until graduating in 1920 with the Governor General's Academic Medal. He played for McGill University in Montreal from 1920 to 1922.

Russel entered McGill to continue his studies in electrical engineering and was commissioned as a lieutenant in the militia. While at McGill he played for the football team coached by Frank "Shag" Shaughnessy. He graduated in 1922 and began working for the Montreal Light, Heat and Power Company. He also joined the Montreal Amateur Athletic Association’s football team, the Winged Wheelers, of the Interprovincial Rugby Football Union and emerged as a star halfback, known for his speed and elusiveness. By 1925, he was the undisputed leader of the team and named captain.

On the night of May 3, 1926, Montreal was struck by a violent thunderstorm and Russel was responsible for a crew from Montreal Light, Heat and Power repairing a downed power line when he was accidentally electrocuted.

== Honours and awards ==
The Jeff Russel Memorial Trophy is presented annually, in his honour to the most outstanding player of the Quebec University Football League. At its origin in 1928, the trophy was awarded to the Interprovincial Rugby Football Union player possessing courage, fair play and sportsmanship but by 1973, it recognised the most outstanding player in the Canadian Football League East Division. In 1994, the trophy was retired at the request of the Russel family. In 2003, it was re-established for recognising players in the Quebec conference of CIS football.

On June 19, 1963, Russel was elected as a player to the Canadian Football Hall of Fame and in 1975, inducted into Canada's Sports Hall of Fame as an athlete.

At Lower Canada College the Russel house is named after him.
