= Timothy Porteous =

Canadian administrator (1933–2020)

- Born: August 31, 1933; Montreal, Quebec, Canada
- Died: February 11, 2020 (aged 86)
- Education: McGill University
- Occupation: administrator

John Timothy Irvine Porteous, CM (August 31, 1933 – February 11, 2020) was a Canadian administrator.

== Student days ==
A native of Montreal, he studied at Bishop's College School, Selwyn House School and McGill University, where he earned both a bachelor of arts and a bachelor of civil law. Porteous first met Pierre Trudeau in 1957 when the two were students traveling in West Africa for a World University Service of Canada seminar, for which Porteous represented McGill, where he had previously been responsible for the outstanding 1957 student production of My Fur Lady, which he co-wrote.

== Early career ==
He and Trudeau remained friends and became even closer when Porteous took a two-year leave of absence from his law practice in 1966 and went to Ottawa to work as an executive assistant to Treasury Board president Charles Drury, before volunteering as a speechwriter on Trudeau's 1968 leadership campaign.

He is credited with introducing Trudeau to Margaret Sinclair, who Trudeau later married.

When Trudeau won the Liberal Party leadership campaign, on becoming Prime Minister later in 1968 he offered Porteous a job as his executive assistant, a position he held for five years. After his time in government, Porteous went on to head both the Canada Council and the Ontario College of Art and Design.

== Canada Council ==
Porteous was perhaps best known for his 12-year tenure as associate director and director of the Canada Council. He was appointed to be a Member of the Order of Canada in October 2003, in recognition of his public service.
