= Royal Trust Company =

Canadian trust company

- Type: Subsidiary
- Industry: Financial services
- Founded: 24 June 1892; 134 years ago
- Headquarters: RBC Centre, 155 Wellington Street W., Toronto, Ontario
- Services: Trust company
- Parent: Royal Bank of Canada (1993–present)
- Website: Official website

The Royal Trust Company is a Canadian trust company that was founded in 1892 in Montreal, Quebec. By the late 20th century, it carried out trust, financial, real estate and deposit services in over 100 branches in Canada, the U.S. and overseas. In 1993, the company was bought by the Royal Bank of Canada, and Royal Trust is now part of RBC Wealth Management.

== History ==
The Royal Trust Company was founded in 1892 as the Royal Trust and Fidelity Company when on 24 June of that year its articles of incorporation were assented by the Parliament of Quebec. The founding members were Edward S. Clouston, J. Burnett, Frank Paul, George A. Drummond, Richard B. Angus, David Burke, C. G. Clouston, John Cassils, R. D. McGibbon, Louis-Joseph Forget, Charles R. Hosmer, James Ross, Herbert S. Holt, and D. Macmaster. Of its charter board of 16 members, nine were members of the Bank of Montreal's board. The firm shared the premises of that bank from 1895. Donald Smith, who at the time presided over the Bank of Montreal, was the inaugural president of Royal Trust. In 1895, Royal Trust and Fidelity changed its name to Royal Trust Company.

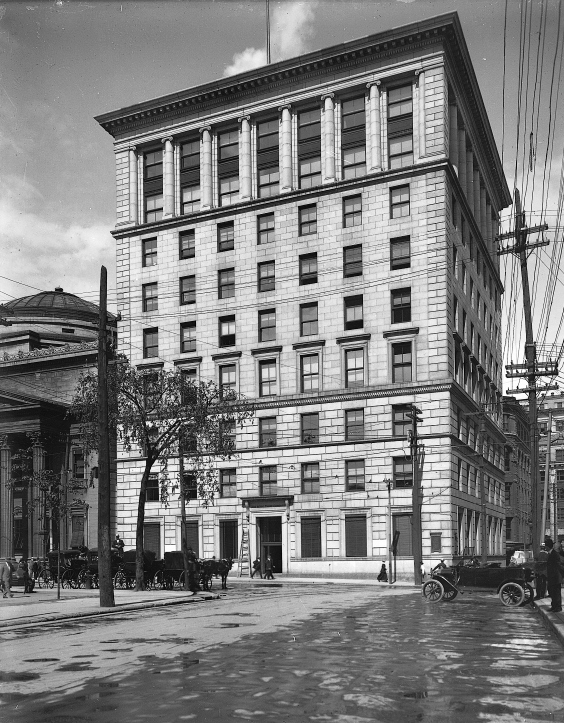
The Royal Trust Building on Place d'Armes, designed by McKim, Mead & White

Royal Trust operated out of the Bank of Montreal Building until 1912. That year, it moved into the new Royal Trust Building at 105 St. James Street, built next door to the Bank of Montreal. The site of the new building was occupied formerly by the Alliance Fire Assurance Building. The Royal Trust Building was designed by the American firm of McKim, Mead and White, which had also designed the Bank of Montreal. The building was ten storeys tall, which was the maximum allowed height in Montreal between 1901 and 1923.

In 1937, Royal Trust opened a new building to house its Toronto offices. This Royal Trust Building was designed by Allward & Gouinlock and was located at 66 King Street West. It was demolished in 1972 to make way for First Canadian Place. In 1969, the company relocated its head offices to the new Royal Trust Tower, which was part of the Toronto-Dominion Centre complex. Since 2009, Royal Trust has had its headquarters in the RBC Centre.

In 1978, Royal Trustco Ltd. was founded in Ottawa to manage Royal Trust. In the mid-1980s, Royal Trustco ranked among the ten largest financial institutions in Canada.

Canadian real estate developer Robert Campeau attempted to acquire the bank in 1978 and approached then-CEO Kenneth White with an offer that White rebuffed. White later worked with the head of Toronto-Dominion Bank to sell a majority of shares to a consortium of Canadian businessmen. That consortium sold the bank in July 1983 to Trilon Financial Corporation, which was formed in 1982 as the financial service company of Brascan, which was controlled by the Bronfman family. Trilon made a $102 million share offering, the proceeds of which were used to acquire a 42% controlling interest in Royal Trust.

In 1984, the real estate agency A.E. LePage merged with Royal Trust to create the leading diversified real estate services organization in Canada. The new company was named Royal LePage.

In 1986, Royal Trustco acquired Dow Financial Services Corporation, Dow Chemical's financial services subsidiary, for C$239 million. Following this purchase, Royal Trust established R.T. Securities and Royal International in Amsterdam and opened an office in Tokyo to promote trade between Japan and Canada.

In 1987, Royal LePage became a publicly traded company, trading on the Toronto, Vancouver and Montreal stock exchanges.

In 1993, the firm was bought out by the Royal Bank of Canada.

== Leadership ==
=== President ===
- Sir Vincent Meredith, – 24 February 1929
- Sir Charles Blair Gordon, 12 March 1929 – 30 July 1939
- Huntley Redpath Drummond, 14 November 1939 – 9 February 1943
- Robert Patterson Jellett, 9 February 1943 –1950
- Ross Clarkson, 1950–1955
- Jack Pembroke, 1955 – 31 December 1962
- John M. Wells, 1 January 1963 – 14 September 1965
- Conrad Fetherstonhaugh Harrington, 14 September 1965 – 13 January 1970
- Kenneth Alan White, 1970–March 1981
- John Merton Scholes, March 1981 – March 1983
- Kenneth Alan White, March 1983 – August 1983
- Michael Adriaan Cornellisen, August 1983 – 1992
- James Miller, 1992–

=== Chairman of the Board ===
- Robert Patterson Jellett, 1950 – 1955
- Ross Clarkson, 1955 – 1 January 1963
- Jack Pembroke, 1 January 1963 – 3 January 1970
- Conrad Fetherstonhaugh Harrington, 13 January 1970 – March 1978
- Kenneth Alan White, March 1978 – 1983
- John Trevor Eyton, 1983 – October 1984
- Hartland Molson MacDougall, October 1984 –
