= Ralph C. S. Walker =

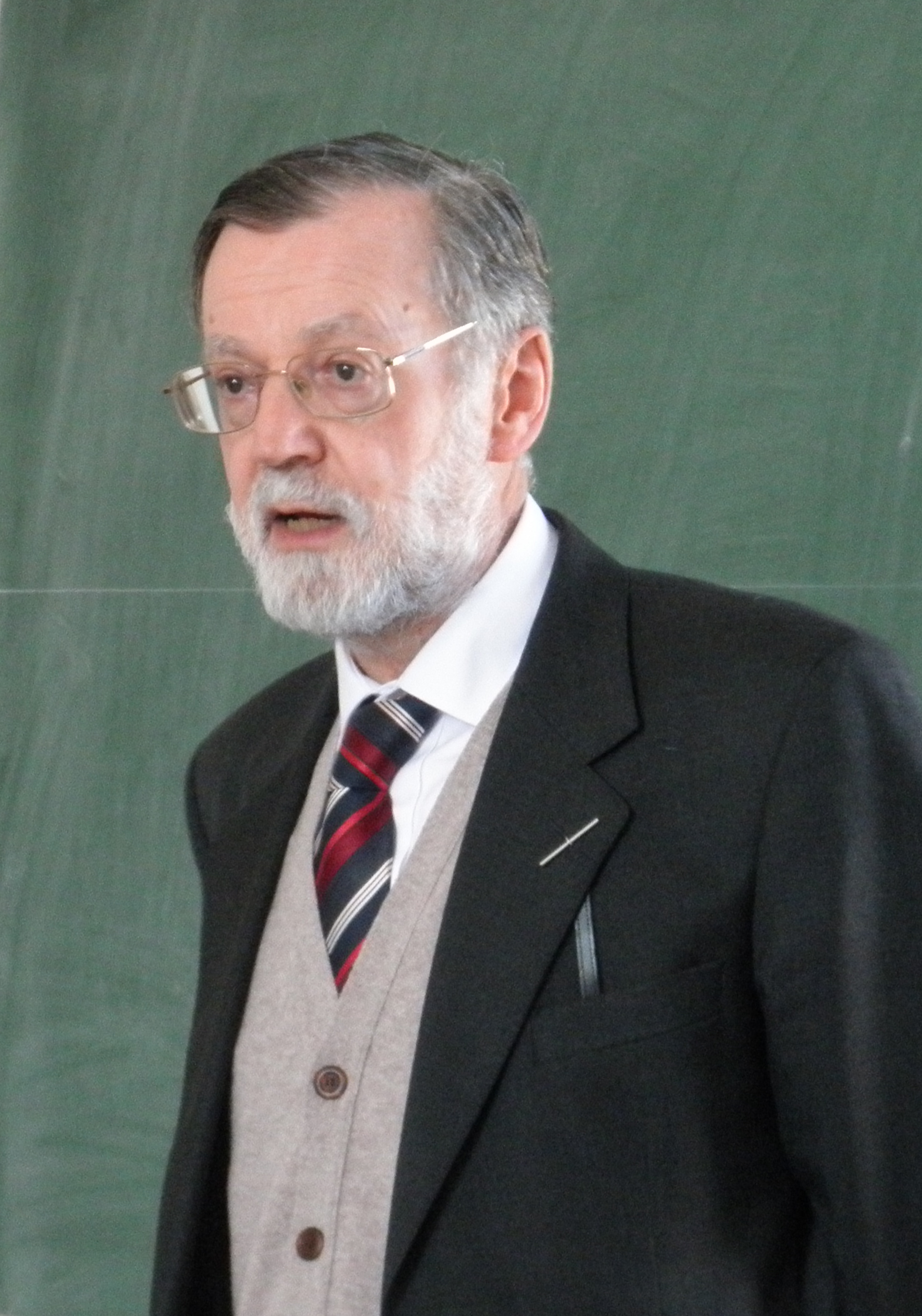
- Ralph Walker during a speech in 2012
- Born: Ralph Charles Sutherland Walker; 2 June 1944 (age 82)

Education
- Education: McGill University; Balliol College, Oxford
- Academic advisor: Harold Henry Cox

Philosophical work
- Era: Contemporary philosophy
- Region: Western philosophy
- School: Analytic philosophy Coherence theory of truth
- Institutions: Magdalen College, Oxford
- Doctoral students: J. A. Harris
- Notable students: Michael N. Forster
- Main interests: Kant · moral philosophy

Ralph Charles Sutherland Walker (born 2 June 1944) is a British philosopher who is an emeritus fellow of Magdalen College, Oxford and an expert on the philosophy of Immanuel Kant.

== Professional life ==
Walker received his secondary education at Aberdeen Grammar School, Selwyn House School and Trinity College School. He was then educated at McGill and Oxford, where he was a Rhodes Scholar at Balliol College, before entering academia as a fellow at Merton College in 1968. He moved to Magdalen in 1972, where he has worked since. From 1984–85, he served as the junior proctor, with disciplinary oversight for the university. From 1993–2003 he was a delegate to Oxford University Press and from 2000–2006 he was head of the Humanities Division at Oxford, one of the most senior posts at the university. In 2009, he retired from the position of vice-president of Magdalen College. Until his retirement from the position of senior tutor in philosophy at Magdalen in 2012, he lectured in the Faculty of Philosophy, normally on Kant. Upon his retirement, he was made an emeritus fellow of Magdalen College.

Roger Scruton called Walker's book Kant "clear and scholarly" and the “‘positive’ rejoinder" to the “‘objective’ interpretation" of Kant's Critique of Pure Reason, The Bounds of Sense, by P. F. Strawson, who had already been at Magdalen when Walker started his work there and remained a fellow until 1987. Walker's later book, Kant and the Moral Law, was released in 1998 and has been translated into a number of languages. His most recent work, Objective Imperatives: An Exploration of Kant's Moral Philosophy, was published in 2022.

Apart from focusing on Kant, Walker has also made contributions to the coherence theory of truth.

== Bibliography ==
=== Books ===
- A Selective Bibliography on Kant. Oxford: Sub-Faculty of Philosophy, 1975. ISBN 978-0905740041
- Kant. London: Routledge & Kegan Paul, 1978. ISBN 978-0710089946
- Kant on Pure Reason. Oxford: Oxford University Press, 1982. ISBN 978-0198750567
- The Coherence Theory of Truth: Realism, Anti-Realism, Idealism. London: Routledge, 1989. ISBN 978-0415018685
- The Real in the Ideal: Berkeley's Relation to Kant. New York; London: Garland, 1989. ISBN 978-0824024475
- Kant: Kant and the Moral Law. London: Phoenix, 1998. ISBN 978-0753801963
- Objective Imperatives: An Exploration of Kant's Moral Philosophy. Oxford, 2022. ISBN 978-0191947865

=== Papers ===
Journal articles and papers by Ralph Walker can be found at JSTOR and philpapers. See below for a selection of his papers:

- ‘The Status of Kant's Theory of Matter’, Synthese 23:1 (Aug., 1971), pp. 121–126.
- ‘Spinoza and the Coherence Theory of Truth’, Mind 94:373 (Jan., 1985), pp. 1–18.
- ‘Verificationism, Anti-Realism and Idealism’, European Journal of Philosophy 3:3 (1995), pp. 257–272.
- ‘Kant, Duty, and Moral Worth’, International Philosophical Quarterly 42:2 (2002), pp. 265–267.
- ‘Kant on the Number of Worlds, British Journal for the History of Philosophy 18:5 (2011), pp. 821–843.
