= Non nobis solum =

Latin for "not for ourselves alone"

Non nobis solum (English: "not for ourselves alone") is a Latin motto. Common variations are non nobis, sed omnibus ("not for us, but for everyone") and non nobis solum, sed omnibus. It means that people should contribute to the general greater good of humanity, apart from their own interests.

== Origin ==
The motto is derived from a sentence in Cicero's most influential philosophical work, his treatise On Duties (Latin: De Officiis). In full, Cicero writes, "non nobis solum nati sumus ortusque nostri partem patria vindicat, partem amici" ("Not for us alone are we born; our country, our friends, have a share in us"; De Officiis, 1:22). The sentence, as Cicero himself says, is a literal translation of a sentiment from Plato's Epistle to Archytas. In the context of the passage, the sentence means that "humans have been created for the sake of others of their kind, indeed, to benefit each other as much as possible". Cicero associates this concept with the Stoic ideal of cosmopolitanism, according to which all men have a natural kinship with all other men and need to "contribute to the general good by an interchange of acts of kindness (officia), by giving and receiving."

== Usage by organizations ==
The motto is used by numerous organizations, including the United States Army 1st Maintenance Company and schools including Massanutten Academy, Walnut Hill School for the Arts, Pennthorpe School, Lower Canada College, University College, Durham, University of Victoria's St. Joseph School of Nursing, Washburn University, Willamette University, Swarthmore College (Class of 1918's motto), and Camp Kanawana, a YMCA camp north of Montreal, Quebec. It is the motto of the Baron Haden-Guest and appears in the Baron's coat of arms. The motto was also incorporated into the coat of arms for Frank Seiberling and appears over the entrance to Stan Hywet, their Akron, Ohio mansion built in the early 1900s. This motto was also part of the crest of the family of George Fosberry, soldier and arms designer. The crest and motto can be seen on the breech of the surviving example of his breechloading prototype rifle.

== See also ==
- Non nobis
- Solidarity
- Ubuntu philosophy
