= James Campbell Clouston =

Royal Navy officer

- Born: 31 August 1900; Montreal, Quebec
- Died: 3 June 1940 (aged 39); English Channel
- Burial place: Becklingen War Cemetery, Lower Saxony, Germany
- Military career
- Allegiance: United Kingdom
- Branch: Royal Navy
- Service years: 1923–1940
- Rank: Commander
- Commands: HMS Isis
- Conflicts: World War II: Western Front; French and Low Countries campaign; Battle of France; Dunkirk evacuation (DOW)

James Campbell Clouston (31 August 1900 – 3 June 1940) was a Canadian officer in the British Royal Navy, who acted as pier-master during the Dunkirk evacuation. While returning to Dunkirk, France, his motor launch was sunk by enemy aircraft and he perished awaiting rescue.

== Early life and military service ==
Clouston was born in Montreal, Quebec, Canada, the son of William Stewart Clouston and Evelyn Campbell. Edward Clouston, a prominent banker, was his uncle. He studied at Selwyn House School, Lower Canada College and McGill University. After training at the Royal Naval College, Dartmouth, he was commissioned as a sub-lieutenant on 15 August 1923, with seniority from 15 May 1921. He first served aboard the destroyer leader Montrose in the Mediterranean, receiving promotion to lieutenant on 11 March 1924, with seniority from 15 June 1922. He trained at HMS Excellent, the Naval Gunnery School at Portsmouth, in mid-1927. Clouston had been an ice hockey player, and when stationed at Portsmouth, had organized the staff into a hockey team. He then served as Gunnery Officer in the light cruisers Capetown on the America and West Indies Station, and Delhi at Portsmouth, being promoted to lieutenant commander on 18 June 1930. Promoted to commander on 31 December 1934, Clouston served as a gunnery instructor at Excellent throughout the mid-1930s before being appointed to command the destroyer Isis on 29 May 1937.

== Personal life ==
Clouston married Gwyneth Lilian Vanderpump (1906–2002) on 28 September 1935; they had two sons.

His two younger brothers were also naval officers. Commander William Stratford Clouston (1908–1974), commanded the Royal Navy destroyer Scorpion during the engagement with Scharnhorst in December 1943. Lieutenant John Douglas Clouston (1909–1942) served in the Royal Canadian Naval Volunteer Reserve aboard Loosestrife in the North Atlantic, and was killed in action.

== Dunkirk ==
In May 1940 while Isis was in dock for repairs, Clouston was attached to the Naval Shore Party of eight officers and 160 men under the command of Captain William Tennant sent to the port of Dunkirk to help organise the evacuation. The Naval Shore Party embarked on the destroyer Wolfhound at Dover and sailed on 27 May. Three officers cut cards for their assignments. Clouston won the eastern mole, a narrow wooden walkway mounted on a concrete breakwater, not designed to be used by ships, but the only part of the port that had not been heavily bombed by the Luftwaffe. For the next five days, Clouston organised and regulated the flow of men along the mole into the waiting ships. Megaphone in hand, he shouted instructions, matching the flow of men to the flow of ships. Tennant estimated on May 28, that Clouston was getting men off at a rate of 2,000 an hour. When panicked soldiers began attempting to leave the pier, Clouston, a junior officer alongside him, promptly restored order by waving a revolver in the air, stating, "We have come to take you back to the UK. I have six shots here and I am not a bad shot. The lieutenant behind me is an even better one. So that makes 12 of you. Now get down into those bloody ships!"

On 1 June, Clouston returned to Dover to report to Vice-Admiral Bertram Ramsay. On the afternoon of 2 June, he and a party of 30 men left Dover on two Royal Air Force rescue motorboats for the final night of the evacuation. Off the coast of France, the two boats were strafed and bombed by eight Ju 87 Stukas, and Clouston's boat was sunk, leaving him and his crew clinging to wreckage. When the other boat attempted to pick up survivors, Clouston ordered the other boat to continue to Dunkirk, and refused to be picked up and wanted to remain with his men. A French liaison officer reported an empty lifeboat floating a mile away and Sub-Lieutenant Solomon asked permission to swim over and try to bring it back. Clouston approved and decided to come along. Despite being a good swimmer, Clouston was exhausted, and swam back to the others clinging to the wreck. Clouston's men sang and discussed old times, while Clouston tried to encourage them with white lies about the nearness of rescue, before he and his men eventually succumbed to exhaustion and hypothermia. Only one man, Aircraftsman Carmaham survived. Solomon had reached the empty lifeboat but was unable to get back to the others. On 11 July 1940, Clouston posthumously received a Mention in Despatches for his part in the Dunkirk operation. Clouston is buried in Becklingen War Cemetery, Lower Saxony, Germany.

Clouston was portrayed by William Hope in the 2004 BBC series Dunkirk. Clouston's actions inspired the character of "Commander Bolton" in Christopher Nolan's 2017 film, Dunkirk. Clouston's family drew criticism due to the lack of an actual depiction, with Nolan stating that he could not do Clouston's story justice. Due to the attention drawn to Clouston by the film, Parks Canada installed a plaque in Montreal honouring him for his role in the evacuation at Dunkirk.
