= David Culver =

Canadian businessman (1924–2017)

- Born: 5 December 1924; Winnipeg, Manitoba
- Died: 6 February 2017 (aged 92); Westmount, Quebec
- Education: McGill University (BSc '47); Harvard University (MBA '49)
- Spouse: Mary Cecile Powell (m. 1949)

David Michael Culver CC OQ (5 December 1924 – 6 February 2017) was a Canadian businessman and former chairman and CEO of Alcan Aluminum Limited from 1979 to 1989.

== Early life ==
Born in Winnipeg, Manitoba, Culver attended Selwyn House School and Trinity College School. He received a Bachelor of Science from McGill University in 1947, an MBA from Harvard University, and a Certificate from the Centre d'Études Industrielles in Geneva.

He was a first cousin once removed of Conrad Black; his father's sister was the maternal grandmother of Black.

== Career ==
Culver began working at Alcan in 1949, eventually rising to CEO in 1979. From 1986 to 1989, he was chairman of the Canadian Council of Chief Executives.

In 1989, he became a founding partner of CAI Private Equity, a firm specializing in leveraged buyouts, restructurings, acquisitions, and recapitalizations. He was a co-founder and Canadian chairman for 11 years of the Canada-Japan Business Committee. He was the chairman of iLiv Technologies Inc. (iLiv.com). He was a member of the Augusta National Golf Club.

Culver was the author, with Alan Freeman, of Expect Miracles: Recollections of a Lucky Life (McGIll-Queen's University Press 2014).

In 1983, he was made an Officer of the Order of Canada and was promoted to Companion in 1988. In 1990, he was made an Officer of the National Order of Quebec. He also joined the Order of the Sacred Treasure, Grand Cordon, of Japan. Additionally, in 1990, he was awarded Concordia University's John Molson School of Business Award of Distinction.

== Death ==
Culver died on February 6, 2017, aged 92.
