= Stuart Milner Finlayson =

Canadian businessman and politician (1901–1981)

Stuart Milner Finlayson (May 21, 1901 – April 1, 1981) was a Canadian businessman and politician. He was Chancellor of McGill University in 1975.

== Biography ==
Born in Montreal, Finlayson was educated at McGill University, where he studied engineering. He joined Canadian Marconi in 1919, becoming its president in 1951. He was later chairman of the board and a director of the company until 1977.

He was elected Mayor of Hampstead in 1964, and served until 1974.

He was appointed a governor of McGill University in 1960, and served briefly as Chancellor of McGill University from April to December 1975.
