= Stephen Leopold =

Canadian businessman

- Born: November 15, 1951 (age 74); Montreal, Quebec, Canada
- Education: Selwyn House School
- Alma mater: McGill University

Stephen Leopold (born November 15, 1951) is a Canadian real estate businessman.

== Early life and education ==
He was born in Montreal, Quebec. His father was the late Irwin Leopold, a Montreal businessman, and developer. Irwin Leopold initiated the development of Westmount Square in Montreal, a complex of residential and commercial buildings that formed "a city within a city," was designed by Ludwig Mies van der Rohe.

In Leopold's early years, he attended Selwyn House School, a private school and Westmount High School. He later graduated with honors from McGill University in Montreal, and attended the McGill University Faculty of Law but never graduated.

== Career ==
=== In Canada ===
In 1973, while still at the McGill Faculty of Law, he became an investigator on the Senate Select Committee on Presidential Activities (Senator Sam Ervin's Watergate Committee, or The United States Senate Watergate Committee).

In 1975, Leopold's visibility lead to his appointment as Executive Assistant to Brian Mulroney during Mulroney's 1975-1976 bid for the leadership of the Progressive Conservative Party of Canada. Mulroney would later become Prime Minister of Canada from 1984 to 1993. In Mulroney's personal autobiography published in 2007, and titled Brian Mulroney - Memoirs: 1939-1993 (ISBN 978-0-7710-6536-1). Mulroney refers to humorous travel times with Leopold, and calls Leopold "an energetic and affable young Montrealer".

Following his initial foray into politics, Leopold began, what would ultimately become, his career in real estate.

After the campaign ended, Leopold returned to real estate and became Vice President of Canada's largest mortgage bank, Marcil Trust which was subsequently acquired by the Royal Bank of Canada, and now forms part of RBC Capital Markets.

In 1977 Leopold formed Leopold Properties. In the early 1980's, the company was renamed Leopold Property Consultants, became one of the largest companies in North America to represent only tenants. As a result, Leopold and his company represented some of North America's leading companies and professional firms in the development of new office buildings to house their tenancy. These included such Montreal landmarks as 1001 de Maisonneuve Blvd for Aetna Insurance. In May 1986, while representing Coopers & Lybrand (today PricewaterhouseCoopers), Clarkson Tetrault (today McCarthy Tétrault), and Claridge Investments (the holding company for the descendants of the late Samuel Bronfman), Leopold inspired the redevelopment of one of downtown Montreal's most important heritage sites, The Windsor Hotel. His leadership in the real estate industry, coupled with his well-publicized association with Prime Minister Brian Mulroney (1984–1993), brought Leopold into the spotlight in the Canadian press. He used this prominence to take controversial public stands. In 1984, as a leader of Montreal's anglophone community, Leopold proclaimed that notwithstanding the threat of the Quebec sovereignty movement, the hydroelectric power resources of Quebec would always sustain it as a vibrant economy. Controversial at times, in 1985, he publicly questioned where large pension funds were investing in Montreal, asserting that it was foolish to invest in areas without easy public transportation. In 1986, he led the first Canadian business boycott against the apartheid policies of South Africa at a luncheon hosted by Canada's premier luncheon club, The Canadian Club which featured the head of the Canada-South Africa Trade Committee. In 1989 Leopold was featured in Vista Magazine, a national monthly publication in an article titled "Stephen Leopold - Owner, Leopold Property Consultants - Kingpin of Canadian Real Estate".

Upon his return to Montreal in 2010 The Globe and Mail, Canada's national newspaper ran a full page story titled “Real Estate Royalty comes home” stating “He's as close as it comes to real estate royalty in the city even though he was gone for almost two decades”. La Presse, Quebec's leading newspaper, called him “the living legend of the real estate industry” (la <<legende vivante de l’industrie immobiliere>>).

In 2012, Leopold founded AudaCité Montréal, a not-for-profit organization composed of Montréal business leaders ], to mobilize public opinion to support the creation of an iconic bridge to serve as the replacement of the structurally-unsound Champlain Bridge .

=== In New York City ===
In 1993 Leopold relocated to New York City to pursue large scale property development in Manhattan. One of Leopold's largest development transactions included conceiving and creating nearly two acres of food courts in the World Trade Center. Leopold later sold his interest in the World Trade Center projects shortly before the September 11, 2001 attacks.

Leopold has served on the Boards of Directors of the University Club of Montreal, the Edmonton Art Gallery, Ruby Foo's Restaurant and Hotel, the Montreal Alouettes of the Canadian Football League, the Canadian Guild of Crafts, and the Board of Governors of the Roosevelt Institute which in partnership with the National Parks and the National archives is responsible for the maintenance of the birthright grounds, home and Presidential library of President Franklin Delano Roosevelt.

In 2012, Leopold was one of the 100 "experts" in Donald Trump's book The Best Real Estate Advice I Ever Received: 100 Top Experts Share Their Strategies (ISBN 0-307-20999-7).
