= Lower Canada College =

Location
- 4090 Royal Avenue; Montreal, Quebec; Canada
- Coordinates: 45.4705°N 73.6233°W

Information
- School type: Independent day school
- Motto: Non nobis solum (Not for ourselves alone)
- Established: 1909; 117 years ago
- Faculty: 85
- Enrollment: 820
- Campus: Main (urban)
- Colours: Navy, Red, Grey, Gold
- Mascot: Lion
- Sports teams: Lions
- Website: www.lcc.ca

Lower Canada College (LCC) is an independent co-educational English-language school in Montreal, Quebec. It is located in the Monkland Village area of Notre-Dame-de-Grâce. The school offers education from kindergarten through pre-university (Grade 12), with its secondary school offering both the International Baccalaureate Middle Years and Diploma Programmes.

== History ==
Lower Canada College was opened on Royal Avenue by Dr. Charles Fosbery on September 20, 1909. LCC can trace its roots to 1861, when the boarding school St. John's School was started by the Church of St. John the Evangelist.

In 1992, LCC added enrolment for female students to their pre-university program, and the school has been co-educational at all levels since September, 1995. Today, approximately 50% of the student population is female.

== Houses ==
In line with many other Commonwealth schools, LCC divides its students into houses.

Each student from levels K-11 is placed in one of eight houses, named after alumni. There is also a special house designated for pre-university students. The houses, along with their associated colours are:

- Beveridge (Orange)
- Claxton (Red)
- Drummond (White)
- French (Blue)
- Harper (Green)
- Heward (Black)
- Russel (Grey)
- Woods (Maroon)
- Webster (Purple, pre-university house)

Throughout the school year, students compete in friendly inter-school competitions to earn house points, including pep rallies and raising funds for food drives and toy drives.

It is an annual tradition for the eight principal houses to engage in "Shourawe", a spirited day dedicated to inter-house competitions. Prior to 2008, this day was known as "House Wars". However, the term's barbaric connotations evoked backlash, prompting the school to adopt an anagram for the day.

== Admissions ==
As of September 2024, LCC no longer receives government subsidies. The English eligibility certificate is not required at any grade level to attend LCC.

== Notable alumni and former faculty ==
Alumni include:

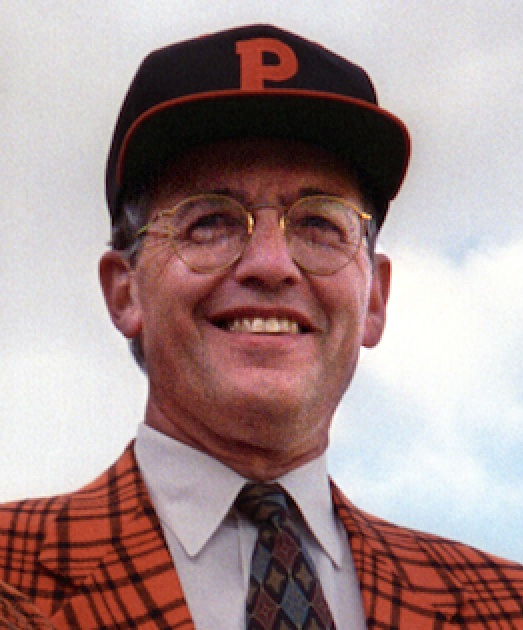
Harold Shapiro

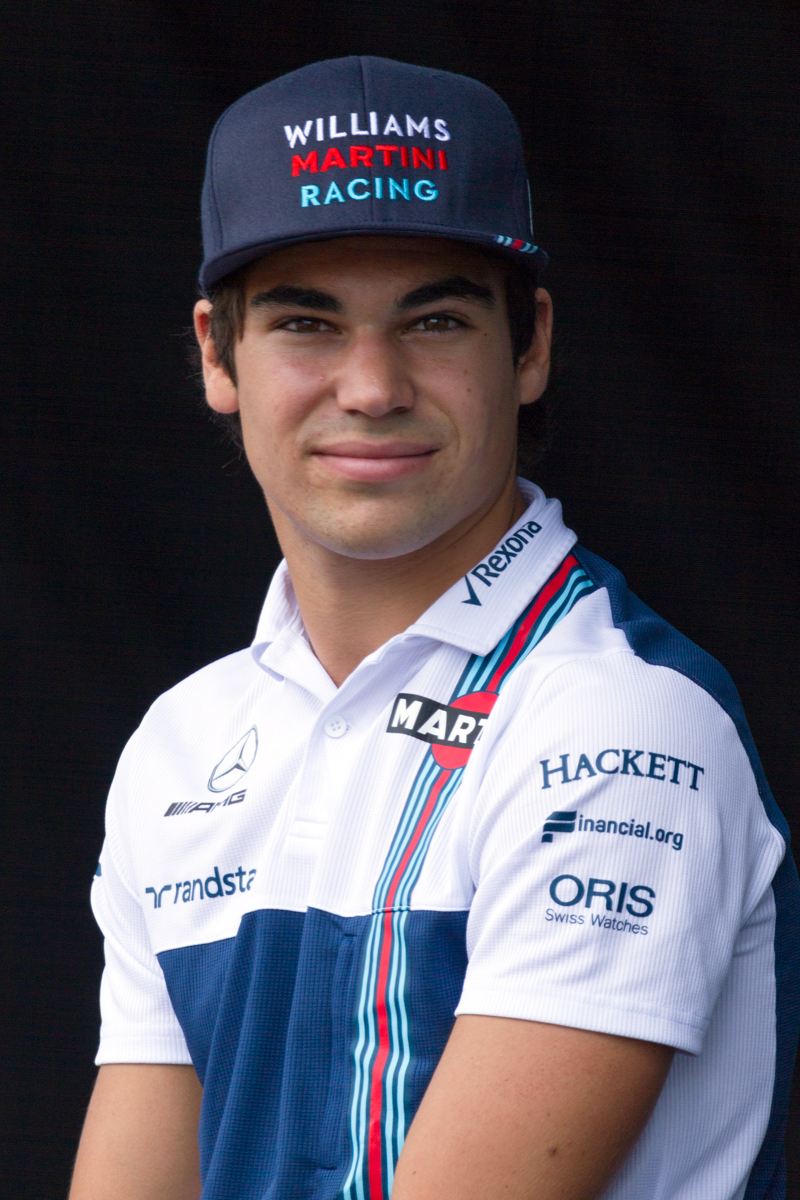
Lance Stroll

- John Aimers
- W. David Angus
- Alex Anthopoulos
- René Balcer
- Peter Behrens
- Gerald Birks
- Maher "Brian" Bitar
- Willard Boyle
- John Brownstein
- Brooke Claxton
- James Campbell Clouston
- Wade Davis
- Arnold Davidson Dunton
- Nirra Fields
- Richard Goldbloom
- Victor Goldbloom
- George Ignatieff
- Lou Marinoff
- Pierre McGuire
- Stuart McLean
- Geoff Molson
- Gordon Nixon (born 1957)
- Larry Rossy
- Greg Rusedski (born 1973)
- Bernard Shapiro
- Harold Tafler Shapiro
- Lance Stroll (born 1998)
- Todd van der Heyden
- Patrick Watson

Faculty include:

- Hugh MacLennan
- F. R. Scott

== See also ==
- Upper Canada College
