= Selwyn House School =

Independent boys' school in Westmount, Quebec, Canada

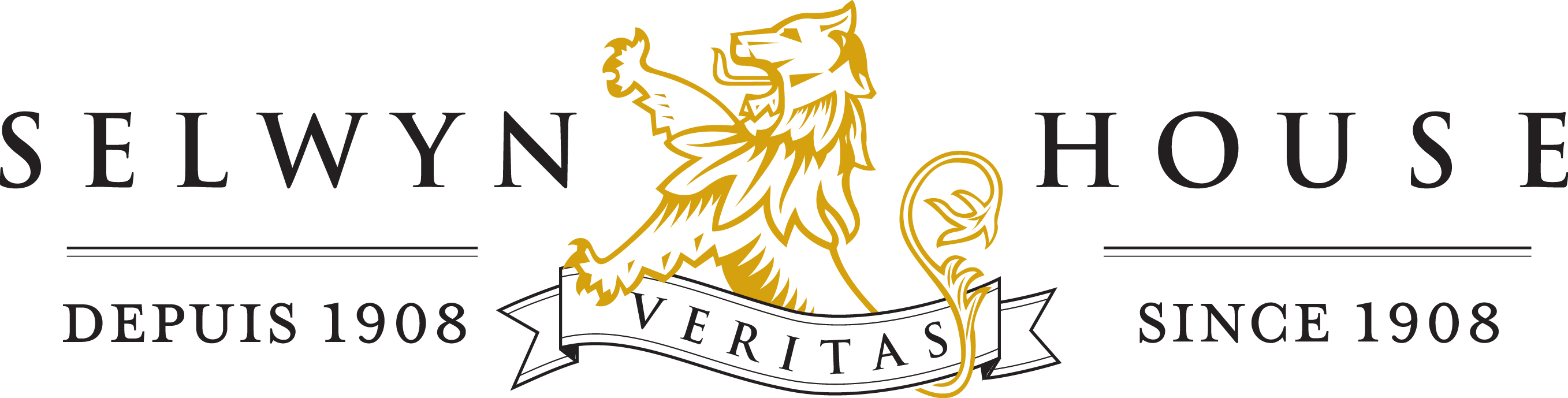

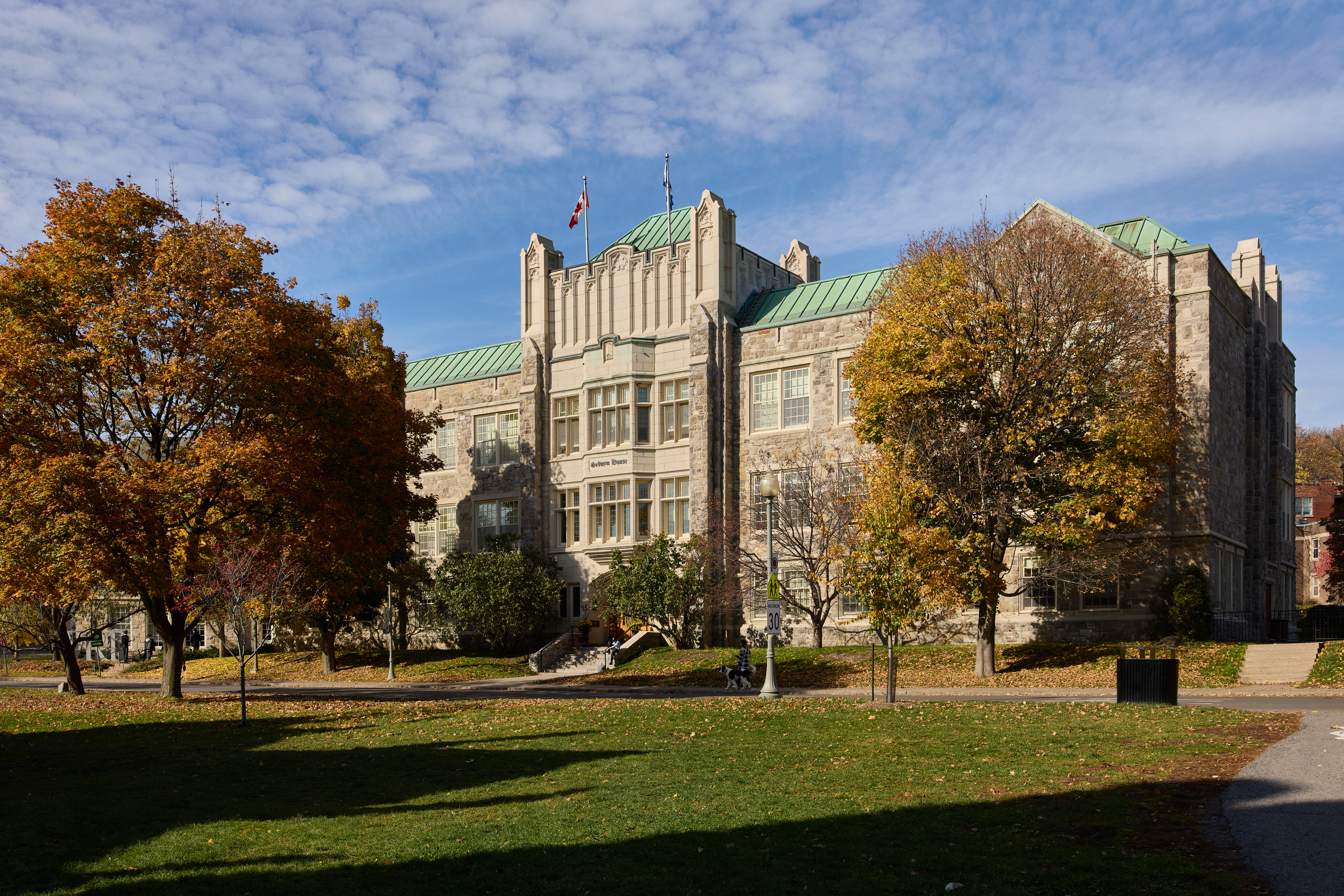
- The Lucas Building, the school's main building, seen from Côte-Saint-Antoine Road in 2022

Location
- 95 chemin de la Côte-Saint-Antoine; Westmount, Quebec, H3Y 2H8; Canada; 45.4862°N 73.5973°W

Information
- Former name: Lucas School (1908–1912)
- School type: Private Independent day school
- Motto: Veritas (Truth)
- Religious affiliation: Non-denominational
- Established: 1908; 118 years ago
- Founder: Algernon Lucas
- Headmaster: Michael Downey
- Grades: Kindergarten–12
- Gender: Boys
- Enrollment: c. 580 (2025)
- Language: English and French
- Campus type: Urban
- Colours: Black and gold
- Mascot: Gryphon
- Team name: Gryphons
- Publication: Veritas (annual magazine)
- Tuition: C$29,675–38,380 (2026–27)
- Affiliations: Canadian Accredited Independent Schools, Quebec Association of Independent Schools, Fédération des établissements d'enseignement privés, National Association of Independent Schools, International Boys' Schools Coalition
- Alumni: Old Boys
- Website: www.selwyn.ca

Selwyn House School is an independent, non-denominational boys' day school in Westmount, an enclave of Montreal, Quebec, Canada, teaching about 580 pupils from kindergarten to Grade 12. It was founded in Montreal in 1908 by Algernon Lucas, an English graduate of Selwyn College, Cambridge, as Lucas School, and was renamed in honour of the college in 1912 by his successor and college contemporary, Colin Campbell Macaulay. Modelled on the English preparatory school, it prepared the sons of Montreal's English-speaking elite for boarding schools such as Bishop's College School and Trinity College School, and until 1945 it was owned outright by its successive headmasters.

The school occupied a house on Mackay Street from 1909 and a mansion at 3458 Redpath Street from 1930. The sudden death in May 1945 of its owner-headmaster, Geoffrey Wanstall, who left no will, nearly closed it; a group of former pupils led by the lawyer G. Miller Hyde bought the school from his estate and incorporated the non-profit Selwyn House Association to run it, and the Association remains its owner. Under Robert A. Speirs, headmaster from 1945 to 1971, Selwyn House bought the former Westmount High School building on Côte-Saint-Antoine Road in 1961 and extended its teaching to Quebec matriculation level, graduating its first Grade 11 class in 1964. It later acquired the neighbouring former St. Andrew's United Church (1985), now the Macaulay Building, and built the Speirs Building (2003).

Selwyn House was among the private English-language schools that accepted Quebec government grants for secondary pupils, which required those pupils to be eligible for English-language schooling under the Charter of the French Language; in 2021 it gave up the grants to admit pupils regardless of eligibility, and in 2023 it added a Grade 12 "pre-university" year, the first in Westmount. Its teams, the Gryphons, compete in the Greater Montreal Athletic Association and, since 2024, in the Canadian Sport School Hockey League.

Long regarded as the school of choice for Montreal's upper class anglophone establishment, it has educated members of the Molson and Bronfman families, and its former pupils include the philosopher Charles Taylor, the Bank of Canada governor Tiff Macklem, the Speaker of the House of Commons Greg Fergus, the Alcan chairman David Culver and the Seagram executives Edgar Bronfman Sr. and Charles Bronfman. Between 2005 and 2009 the school was the defendant in a class action brought by former pupils who alleged sexual abuse by three teachers between the 1960s and 1991; it was settled, without admission of liability, by a court-approved compensation fund of up to $5 million.

== History ==
=== Lucas School and Mackay Street (1908–1930) ===
Algernon Lucas, the founder, in the uniform of the 2nd King Edward's Horse, c. 1915

Algernon Lucas (1879–1916), educated at Warminster Grammar School in Wiltshire, read theology at Selwyn College, Cambridge, graduating in 1903. After four years teaching at St Alban's School in Brockville, Ontario, he came to Montreal in 1908 and, with the backing of the financier Herbert Holt and other families of the Golden Square Mile who wanted a preparatory school closer to home than the existing Wickham House in Westmount or St John's School (the forerunner of Lower Canada College), opened Lucas School in a flat at the Saint Catherine Street end of Crescent Street with seven pupils, a partner named St George, and a curriculum of "the three R's", French, history and geography. The school's own history names the first boys as Robert Holt, Hubert Fairbanks, Stuart Bell, Paul Drummond, Arthur Evans, Gratz Joseph and John Pangman. Within a year it had moved to Mackay Street, just south of Sherbrooke Street: Lovell's Montreal Directory lists "Lucas A, private school" there from its 1909–10 edition, and from 1911 the school occupied a house at no. 452 (later renumbered 1538, and today no. 2130), which was adapted with classrooms on two floors, staff quarters above, a basement "gymnasium" and a carpentry workshop in the former stable. By 1910 it had fifty-five boys, none older than twelve, and a Scout troop, the 41st Montreal, whose black-and-yellow scarves supplied the school colours.

The school on sports day in 1916, photographed by Wm. Notman & Son for the headmaster, C. C. Macaulay

In September 1912 Lucas left teaching for insurance broking and transferred the school to Colin Campbell Macaulay (1875–1959), a graduate of Malvern College and Selwyn College who had matriculated with him in 1899 and had been teaching history at Lower Canada College. Macaulay renamed it Selwyn House after their college and adopted the badge, a lion that was at first depicted wearing a coronet, and the motto Veritas that the school still uses; the school's historians could find no connection between the badge and the college. Lucas married Gail Yuile of Montreal in November 1914 and, having been refused by the Canadian cavalry, obtained a commission in the 2nd King Edward's Horse in February 1915; wounded in France, he was convalescing in Dublin when the Easter Rising broke out, and on the night of 28–29 April 1916 he was shot dead while in charge of a guard at the Guinness malt-house on Robert Street by a Royal Dublin Fusiliers quartermaster-sergeant who took him and a brewery clerk for rebels. The sergeant was tried for murder by court-martial in June 1916 and acquitted. (Note: The school's 1978 history states that Lucas held a commission as a signals officer in the Life Guards and that "a sniper's bullet killed him"; contemporary records (the London Gazette, the 1917 Sinn Fein Rebellion Handbook and the Montreal press) show that he served in the 2nd King Edward's Horse and was shot by a soldier of his own side. His final rank was lieutenant, although later school publications call him "Captain".) His widow endowed the Lucas Medal, designed by the sculptor Louis-Philippe Hébert and first awarded in 1917, which remains the school's highest prize for an all-round graduating pupil.

C. C. Macaulay, headmaster 1912–29

Macaulay ran the school for seventeen years. Staff were recruited almost entirely from Britain, among them Charles Anstey, who taught at the school from 1911 until his death in 1942, latterly setting its standard in mathematics, and whose name is borne by the inter-house academic trophy. As pupils began to come from Westmount and beyond, the school was divided in 1920 between a senior section on Mackay Street and a junior section in Macaulay's own house at 711 Sherbrooke Street; from 1926 the senior school was run by Geoffrey H. T. Wanstall, an Old Rugbeian who had joined the staff in 1921 after serving as an officer of the Dorsetshire Regiment in the First World War. The Jeffrey Russel Prize, named for the footballer Jeff Russel, who had attended Lucas School in 1908–10 and was electrocuted in 1926, was founded in 1927, and the school's annual School Magazine began publication in 1929, prompted by The School Times, a printed paper produced the previous year by a form that included Stephen Leacock, son of the humorist Stephen Leacock. Macaulay retired to England in 1929, selling the school to Wanstall; he died at Rugby on 6 March 1959. (Note: The school's 1978 history gives the year of Macaulay's death as 1958 and his age as 83; the school magazine for 1958–59, reporting his death "on March 6th" at the age of eighty-four, is followed here.)

=== Redpath Street and the Wanstall era (1930–1945) ===
G. H. T. Wanstall, headmaster 1929–45

Wanstall reunited the two sections in June 1930 by buying from a friend a stone mansion at 3458 Redpath Street, a cobbled cul-de-sac off Sherbrooke Street beside the Church of St. Andrew and St. Paul. He lived in the building, beside which a small outdoor rink was built; a brief experiment with boarders in 1931 was abandoned, and the school has never again taken them. Wanstall, a bachelor and keen sportsman whose "ample supply of canes" was, the school's historians wrote, "a school legend", kept the curriculum centred on English, mathematics and French: science found no place in it, and "little or nothing of Canada or Canadian history came within its purview". A library was begun in 1936, a Selwyn House Ski Club opened at Sainte-Adèle in 1938, and in 1940 the poet Patrick Anderson, newly arrived in Canada, joined the staff; he taught at the school until 1946, the years in which he founded the literary magazine Preview, and his left-wing politics caused "acrimonious" common-room disputes with older colleagues. In 1937 former pupils won twenty-three of the forty-five prizes awarded at Bishop's College School and fourteen at Trinity College School, a measure of the school's reputation as a feeder of the boarding schools.

The school's premises at 3458 Redpath Street, from the 1930–31 School Magazine

The Second World War touched the school more closely than the first: two masters joined the navy, one of whom was lost in a submarine; evacuee boys from England were enrolled; and the school's roll of honour, read at the school each Remembrance Day, came to name fifty Old Boys who were killed in action or died on active service, nearly all of them in that war. Wanstall himself fell ill in February 1945 and died in hospital in May, as the war in Europe ended. (Note: The Montreal Star tribute of 7 May 1945, reproduced in the school's centennial history, says that Wanstall died "on Saturday" (5 May) and was born "sixty-two years ago"; the 1978 history says that he died "on the eve of V-E Day" aged sixty-five.)

=== Selwyn House Association and the Speirs era (1945–1971) ===
Wanstall had owned the school outright and died intestate, with his heirs in England and Vichy France; enrolment had fallen to 125, and closure seemed imminent. Three parents, Walter Molson, Philip Mackenzie and Winthrop Brainerd, and Constance Howis, who had kept the school's accounts, pressed for the year to be completed; the lawyer G. Miller Hyde, a former pupil, assembled a committee of Old Boys that offered the estate $25,000 for the school "as a going concern", raised the money through an issue of twenty-year 3% mortgage bonds taken up by parents and friends, and on 19 June 1945 obtained Quebec letters patent for the Selwyn House Association, a non-profit corporation under Part III of the Quebec Companies Act, with Hyde as its first chairman. The committee recruited as headmaster Robert Alan Speirs, a Scot educated at the universities of Edinburgh and Columbia who was head of English and assistant headmaster at Lower Canada College; his appointment was announced at the school's sports day on 13 June 1945.

Speirs introduced weekly tests, prefects, assemblies with visiting speakers (among them Jesse Owens, Robert Watson-Watt and Peter Fleming), a public-speaking society, a Christmas entertainment and a school hymn of his own composition, and the Association's board, which kept the school's first written records, added a gymnasium (1947), the Wanstall Memorial Library (1949), a laboratory in which practical science was taught for the first time (1950), a dining hall designed by the Old Boy architect Francis (Frank) Nobbs (1956) and a further wing (1960). A house system, with houses named Lucas, Macaulay, Wanstall and Speirs after the four headmasters, was adopted in 1951, the Old Boys' Association was founded at a reunion dinner in December 1953, and a staff pension plan followed in 1958. Enrolment grew from 148 in 1945 to 265 in 1960, with a waiting list. Although non-denominational, the school had a Protestant ethos: a quarter-hour of religious instruction opened each morning from the late 1930s, and Speirs, a Presbyterian, wrote its hymn. Edgar Bronfman Sr., who with his brother Charles was sent there in the 1930s and 1940s by their Anglophile father, Samuel Bronfman, recalled it as "a place that enrolled few Jewish boys", where the brothers' friends were "the Protestants at Selwyn House"; Charles Bronfman later said that he "was in [his] twenties before [he] knew French was spoken in the city".

The school remained a preparatory school, most boys leaving at fourteen or fifteen for boarding school, and the board had considered restricting it to junior forms; by 1960, however, placing older boys elsewhere had become difficult and the governors resolved to teach to matriculation. In April 1961 the Westmount Protestant School Board put up for sale the senior Westmount High School building at 95 Côte-Saint-Antoine Road, opposite city hall, as the high school consolidated on a new site on Sainte-Catherine Street. Within three weeks the Association, chaired by the contractor John G. Bourne, had agreed to buy it, financing the purchase by selling the Redpath Street property to McGill University, which also provided a 7% mortgage. The school took possession on 1 July 1961 and the building was formally opened on 14 September 1961 by the mayor of Westmount, J. C. Cushing, who planted a maple tree on the east lawn with Lucas's widow. The old science rooms were converted into a dining hall, Coristine Hall, given by the parents of Christopher Coristine, a former pupil who had died at seventeen helping a younger boy escape when the training ship Albatross foundered in the Gulf of Mexico on 2 May 1961. McGill used the Redpath Street house for offices until 1974, when it was demolished.

Grade 10 was added in 1962 and Grade 11 in 1963; the first matriculation class, of fewer than a dozen boys, sat the McGill junior matriculation examinations in 1964, Canadian football was introduced in 1963, and a bursary fund and a French summer school were begun. Now a full secondary school, Selwyn House was admitted to the Canadian Headmasters' Association and joined the newly formed Quebec Association of Independent Schools, created as the province's new Ministry of Education extended its authority over private schools. Enrolment reached 450 in 1966, after which 425 to 435 was fixed as the optimum; a 1968 extension doubled the gymnasium and added laboratories, a library and classrooms. In 1969 the Association's by-laws were changed to make every paid-up member of the Old Boys' Association a member of the Association, and in 1974 at least eight of the fifteen elected directors were required to be Old Boys. Speirs, who received an honorary LL.D. from Sir George Williams University in 1968, retired in June 1971 with the title of headmaster emeritus and continued to teach linguistics at the school until shortly before his death in March 1981.

=== Expansion in Westmount (1971–2008) ===
Speirs's successor, Alexis S. Troubetzkoy (1934–2017), a Paris-born member of the Russian princely Trubetskoy family who had taught at Stanstead College and Bishop's College School and been registrar of Appleby College, was the first headmaster not from Britain. He replaced the English form names with grade numbers, introduced a cycle timetable with periods for clubs, a Cum Laude Society for graduates with averages of 80% or more and French immersion in Grade 6, and sought a more "democratic" school; his first year ended with the departure of fourteen teachers, including the last of Wanstall's staff. In November 1973 the school began accepting Quebec government grants for its secondary grades, and a charitable Lucas Foundation was created to hold capital and scholarship funds. Troubetzkoy convened staff "mini-Pugwash" conferences on the school's future in 1974 and 1976, and in May 1975 the school hosted "Canada Day", a conference on Canadian writing attended by 1,250 pupils from fifty schools and thirty-two writers, among them Hugh MacLennan, Mordecai Richler and F. R. Scott; a bilingual sequel, "Contact '76", whose participants included Irving Layton and Louis Dudek, followed in 1976. A 1976–77 reconstruction moved the junior school into a new east wing linked by a glazed bridge to the former caretaker's house on Argyle Avenue, and gave the senior school a library three and a half times the size of the old one. The first Founder's Day was held in 1978, the school's seventieth year, with the launch of Veritas, the history of the school by its former senior master Edgar C. Moodey and Speirs. Troubetzkoy left in 1981 to become headmaster of Appleby College and later of the Toronto French School.

Robert Manion, previously of Royal St. George's College in Toronto, was headmaster from 1981 to 1984; during his tenure the Speirs Medal, awarded annually to a teacher, governor or friend of the school, was instituted (1982), and the school's seventy-fifth anniversary was celebrated in 1983, when its endowment fund reached $1 million. William Mitchell, who had taught at Trinity College School and Lower Canada College, became the seventh headmaster in January 1985 and served until December 2008, the longest tenure after Speirs's. With about 485 pupils crowded into one building, the Association in 1985 bought the former St. Andrew's United Church across the street, registered in August 1985 at $1,000,000, after a public consultation on the necessary rezoning at which no objections were raised; the converted church, with a gymnasium in the former sanctuary, opened in November 1986 as the Macaulay Building, and the original school was named the Lucas Building. The school's invitational varsity hockey tournament was first held in December 1985, a kindergarten class was added in 1992, and French was progressively extended through the elementary curriculum. A "Making Room for the Future" capital campaign chaired by the Old Boy André Desmarais raised more than $15 million for a two-phase, $12.5-million construction project: the Speirs Building, a $10.8-million structure designed by the architect Andrea Wolff on the school's former parking lot and rink, was inaugurated on 10 November 2003, and renovations of the Lucas Building followed over four summers, ending in 2006 with the conversion of its 1935 gymnasium into a dining hall and auditorium, the new Coristine Hall. The school's centennial in 2007–08 was marked by a gala that raised about $1.45 million for the endowment and local charities and by a published history, Selwyn House School: Celebrating 100 Years.

=== Recent history (2009–present) ===
Hal Hannaford, for twelve years headmaster of Royal St. George's College and himself a Lower Canada College graduate, succeeded Mitchell in January 2009, in the final months of the class action described below. In 2010 the school, which rented ice in Westmount's municipal arena and described itself as its "best tenant", campaigned among parents for the city's $37-million arena and pool project. Hannaford retired in June 2020 and was succeeded by Michael Downey, a science teacher and coach who had worked at the school for thirty years and was its assistant headmaster and head of senior school; the board chairman, Jonathan Goldbloom, said that after searching "the world" the board had found "the best candidate ... right here in our own backyard".

From the 1970s the school had received Quebec grants for its secondary grades, about $1.0–1.6 million a year in the 2000s and 2010s, on condition that those pupils held certificates of eligibility for English-language instruction under the Charter of the French Language; the elementary school, which was unsubsidized, was open to all, but each year eight to twelve Grade 6 boys without certificates had to leave. This became a bigger issue once the provincial government changed a law in 2002 that had previously made it possible for a student without a certificate to gain one by attending a non-subsidized, English elementary school. Following The Study (2016) and ahead of Lower Canada College (2024), Selwyn House gave up its grant of roughly $5,000 per pupil in 2021 and became fully private, which allowed it to admit pupils without certificates including from French-language elementary schools; Downey said applications subsequently "went through the roof", with "a big contingent out of the francophone sector", while the office of Quebec's education minister, Bernard Drainville, said it deplored the decision of such schools. In November 2022 the school announced a Grade 12 "pre-university" year, the first in Westmount, as an alternative to CEGEP; the first cohort of about twenty boys began in September 2023, following a curriculum based on New Brunswick's Grade 12 and leading to that province's diploma. To house the programme the school entered negotiations in 2023 to buy the neighbouring St. Matthias' Anglican Church while preserving its sanctuary for the congregation, and in December 2024 it bought a building at 4120 Vendôme Avenue, on the edge of the Villa Maria campus, from the Congregation of Notre Dame for $5 million; in May 2026 Downey said the Vendôme building was "on hold" pending the St. Matthias talks and the Grade 12 pupils remained in the Speirs Building.

== Campus ==
The school occupies three linked buildings at the corner of Côte-Saint-Antoine Road and Stanton Street in Westmount, opposite Westmount City Hall.

=== Lucas Building ===
The building as Argyle Junior High School, on a postcard of about 1935

The main building, at 95 Côte-Saint-Antoine Road, was built in 1935 by the Westmount Protestant School Board as Westmount Junior High School, on the site of the Côte-Saint-Antoine Academy of 1895 (later Westmount Academy and, from 1914, Argyle School), which had been demolished in 1934 because of foundation problems. The new school cost about $250,000 including the land, became Westmount's senior high school in 1940 and was sold to the Selwyn House Association in 1961. Designed by the architect Charles Reginald Tetley and built by the Bremner-Norris Company in greystone, to harmonize with the city hall opposite, it was altered for the school by Francis J. Nobbs between 1961 and 1968. The city's 1991 heritage inventory, Westmount: A Heritage to Preserve, lists it as a "very significant" building and counts it, with Victoria Hall (1924) and the Church of the Ascension of Our Lord, among the neo-Gothic buildings of the interwar years that reinforced the prestige of the district. It houses the elementary and middle schools and Coristine Hall, the dining hall and auditorium created in 2006 from the original gymnasium and named, like its 1961 predecessor, in memory of Christopher Coristine.

=== Macaulay Building ===
St. Andrew's Church in 1910; the present Macaulay Building replaced it after the fire of 1965

The Macaulay Building, at 101–103 Côte-Saint-Antoine Road on the north side of the street, is the former St. Andrew's United Church. The congregation, formed in 1900 after a split in the Melville Presbyterian Church over temperance, built a red-brick Romanesque church designed by Alexander Cowper Hutchison in 1908–09; it later joined the United Church of Canada, was gutted by fire in 1965, and was rebuilt in concrete, brick and oak in 1966–67 to designs from the office of Harold Lea Fetherstonhaugh. When the congregation merged with Dominion-Douglas Church in 1985 the building was sold to the school, which converted it, under the architect Bruce Anderson, into classrooms, offices and a second gymnasium.

=== Speirs Building and other properties ===
The Speirs Building, opened in 2003 on the school's former parking lot and rink on Stanton Street, adjoins the Lucas Building and is connected to the Macaulay Building by a tunnel beneath the street; it contains the Wanstall Library and learning centre, computer laboratories, classrooms, administrative offices, an agora for assemblies and a full-size underground gymnasium with a climbing wall; its stone exterior was designed to harmonize with the Lucas Building. The school acquired the former caretaker's house on Argyle Avenue with the building in 1961 and two neighbouring houses in 1968; part of the former was linked to the Lucas Building by a glazed bridge in 1977. In 2024 it bought a building on Vendôme Avenue for future expansion. The school has never had playing fields of its own: field sports are played in Westmount's parks, and hockey at McGill's McConnell Arena, the Westmount Recreation Centre and other city rinks.

== Academics and admissions ==
Selwyn House teaches kindergarten to Grade 11, the final year of secondary school in Quebec, leading to the Secondary School Diploma, with the optional Grade 12 year leading to a New Brunswick diploma; Advanced Placement courses are offered in the senior school and the school is a UCAS centre for applicants to British universities. Instruction is bilingual: since 1999 pupils from kindergarten to Grade 2 have spent about 80% of their time working in French, and those in Grades 3 to 6 about half, with the proportion falling in the secondary grades. The journalist Jonathan Kay, who graduated in 1985, has written that the school of his day was "lily-white", sang "God Save the Queen" at assembly and caned wayward boys, and that it was then "more socially difficult to be a francophone than a Jew" there; returning decades later he found "a multicultural reflection of Montreal" with "as much French in the hallways as English". In the Fraser Institute's 2020 report card on Quebec secondary schools, based on ministry examination results, Selwyn House ranked 74th of 473 schools for 2019 and 50th of 427 over the five years 2015–19.

Fees for 2026–27 range from $29,675 to $38,380 a year; bursaries of up to half of fees or more are available from Grade 7, and no athletic scholarships are offered. Enrolment was capped at about 350 on the move to Westmount, stood at about 485 in 1985 and 550 in 2010, and was about 580 in 2025; the school employed 126 full-time and 95 part-time staff in that year. The school is a member of Canadian Accredited Independent Schools, the Quebec Association of Independent Schools, the Fédération des établissements d'enseignement privés and the International Boys' Schools Coalition. Ten former pupils have been Rhodes Scholars, according to the school, among them Charles Taylor (1946) and the philosopher Ralph C. S. Walker (1959).

== Student life ==
=== Houses, prefects and awards ===
Pupils are divided into four houses named after the first four headmasters, Lucas, Macaulay, Wanstall and Speirs, which have competed since 1951–52 for the Governors' Shield in sport, academic work and other activities; the junior school has had its own competition, for the Afra Snead Shield, since 1967. A prefect system dates from 1945. The principal prizes are the Lucas Medal (1917), chosen by secret ballot of the staff and graduating class and announced only at the prize-giving, the Jeffrey Russel Prize (1927) and the Brainerd Prize for effort and public spirit (1958); the Speirs Medal (1982), presented each Founder's Day, honours an adult who has made a significant contribution to the school. The school's Scout troop, once its chief extracurricular activity, lapsed on the move to Westmount in 1961.

=== Athletics ===
The school's early sports were rugby, soccer, hockey, cricket, skiing and gymnastics; cricket died out around 1960 for lack of pitches and opponents, Canadian football was adopted in 1963, and rugby union, introduced by a Welsh games master around 1960, produced the school's first championship team in 1974. Selwyn House joined the Greater Montreal Inter-Scholastic Athletic Association (now the Greater Montreal Athletic Association of the Réseau du sport étudiant du Québec, in which it still competes) in 1967, and by 1978 fielded eighteen teams, thirteen of them in league play. Its teams, known as the Gryphons, have traditional rivalries with Lower Canada College and Loyola High School; the varsity hockey team won the provincial championship in 1991–92 and the school has hosted an invitational varsity hockey tournament, which by 1992 drew teams from Toronto, Halifax, Lennoxville and the former Czechoslovakia, every December since 1985. An under-17 hockey team joined the Canadian Sport School Hockey League's eastern division for the 2024–25 season. Teams have toured abroad since the mid-1980s, beginning with a bantam hockey trip to a world tournament in Helsinki, with a side visit to Leningrad, over the Christmas holidays of 1984–85, followed by a rugby "Tour de France".

=== Publications and traditions ===
The original crest, as printed on the first School Magazine in 1929

The School Magazine, an annual record of the school's year, was published from 1929; under Troubetzkoy it became a conventional yearbook, and the name Veritas now belongs to the school's annual magazine for parents and alumni. Pupils' newspapers have included The School Times (1928), The Veritas (1939–40), The Black and the Gold (1954), The Selwyn House Chronicle and The Redpath Herald (1956–57), The S.H.S. Examiner (1968–77) and The Moon (1977), and from 1973 the annual anthology The Fourth Dimension collected the best creative writing in the school. The school hymn, written by Speirs to the Welsh hymn tune "St Denio", has been sung at prize-givings since the mid-1940s, and a French verse was added for the centenary. Founder's Day has been observed each autumn since 1978, and the Old Boys' Association, whose president sits ex officio on the school's board, organizes reunions, an annual golf tournament and an alumni hockey tournament. The school has held co-educational events with neighbouring girls' schools since a winter carnival shared with one of them in 1968–69. It has also digitized its yearbooks, magazines and programmes from 1929 onward and made them freely available through the Internet Archive.

== Governance and finances ==
The school is owned and operated by the Selwyn House Association, the registered charity incorporated in 1945, whose board was chaired by a former pupil throughout its first three decades; its original members were drawn from the bondholders who financed the 1945 purchase, and since 1969 its membership has been drawn from the Old Boys' Association. The Association reported revenue of $24.0 million for the year ending 30 June 2025, mostly from fees, against $15.7 million in 2021; provincial grants, which had been $1.0–1.6 million a year, ceased after the 2020–21 school year. Two affiliated foundations support it: the Veritas Fund (established in 1977 as the Selwyn House Endowment Fund), whose assets grew from about $3 million in 2004 to $23.3 million in 2025 and which funds bursaries and special projects, and the Lucas Foundation, created in 1973–74 to pay for capital expenditure. Pupils and parents raise money each year for cancer research through the Terry Fox Run and a "Shave to Save" campaign, among other charitable projects.

== Controversies ==
In September 2005 a former pupil applied to the Superior Court of Quebec to bring a $15-million class action against the school, alleging that it had been negligent in allowing a teacher, Leigh Seville, to molest him and other boys in the late 1970s and early 1980s. Seville, who had taught English and geography at Selwyn House since about 1967, had killed himself and his elderly father in 1991, days after the headmaster, William Mitchell, confronted him about an anonymous telephone tip; Mitchell said in 2005 that the tip had been the school's first indication of misconduct. In February 2006 two more former pupils filed separate applications, each seeking $19 million, naming two other former teachers: John Aimers, the founder and chairman of the Monarchist League of Canada, who had attended the school and taught there in the 1970s, and James P. Hill, who had taught there from 1961 to 1972 and whose whereabouts were reported as unknown. Aimers denied any wrongdoing; he resigned as the League's chairman, and a police complaint lodged against him in 1997 had not been pursued for lack of evidence. None of the allegations was tested in court.

In February 2008 the school, while denying any wrongdoing or liability, filed a proposed settlement offering up to $5 million in compensation to former pupils and their families, a confidential claims process and a statement of regret. In August 2008 Justice Pierre Gagnon declined to approve it, holding that class members could not be asked to decide whether to opt out without first knowing the compensation they might receive, and at the request of The Globe and Mail and CTV News he unsealed much of the court file. The unsealed affidavits alleged that parents had complained to the school about Seville in 1971 and raised concerns again in 1983, and that the school had made a confidential payment for therapy to another former pupil in 1993; the board chairman, Edward Claxton, said the school believed it had "treated any information brought to its attention seriously" and responded "in a professional and sensitive manner". A revised agreement was approved on 13 January 2009. It created a fund of up to $5 million for about 35 former pupils, their partners and parents, with a ninety-day claims period advertised in major newspapers; the school continued to deny liability, and Aimers also signed the agreement. The allegations covered the years from 1961 to 1991. In July 2009 the school posted a statement on its website expressing "apologies and regrets to former students who have presented claims asserting any form of sexual abuse during their time at the school". The rejected-then-approved settlement has since been discussed in legal scholarship as an example of judicial scrutiny of class-action settlements.

Separately, an elementary teacher, Richard Doucet, was arrested in Virginia in May 2008 in an online child-solicitation sting and in 2009 pleaded guilty there to sex and child-pornography offences and was sentenced to two consecutive fourteen-year terms; the school said no Selwyn House pupils were involved. In May 2009 a computer technician at the school was charged in Châteauguay with sexual interference involving minors who were not Selwyn House pupils.

== Headmasters ==
Headmaster	Tenure	Notes
Algernon Lucas	1908–1912	Founder; owner. Killed in Dublin during the Easter Rising, 1916.
Colin Campbell Macaulay	1912–1929	Owner; renamed the school. Retired to England.
Geoffrey H. T. Wanstall	1929–1945	Owner; moved the school to Redpath Street. Died in office.
Robert A. Speirs	1945–1971	First headmaster under the Selwyn House Association; moved the school to Westmount and extended it to Grade 11. Headmaster emeritus 1971–81.
Alexis S. Troubetzkoy	1971–1981	Later headmaster of Appleby College and the Toronto French School.
Robert Manion	1981–1984	Previously of Royal St. George's College.
William Mitchell	1985–2008	Acquired the Macaulay Building; built the Speirs Building. Later head of Bishop's College School, 2012–15.
Hal Hannaford	2009–2020	Previously headmaster of Royal St. George's College.
Michael Downey	2020–	Formerly assistant headmaster and head of senior school.

== Notable people ==
Selwyn House has historically been the alma mater for Montreal's anglophone establishment: Vanity Fair called it a school "that has educated much of the city's Anglophone elite", and The Globe and Mail "Montreal's most prestigious English school". Members of the Molson family have attended in every decade of its existence, according to the school, beginning with Thomas Henry Pentland Molson, who appears in the only surviving photograph of Lucas School, taken in 1911; the Association's founding bondholders of 1945 included members of the Molson, Bronfman, Drury and Meredith families. Former pupils (listed with the year they left or graduated where known) include:

Business

- Charles Bronfman (1937–45), co-chairman of Seagram, founder of the Montreal Expos
- Edgar Bronfman Sr., chief executive of Seagram and president of the World Jewish Congress
- Edward Bronfman, co-founder of the Edper Group
- David Culver (1931–39), chairman and chief executive of Alcan
- André Desmarais (1973), deputy chairman of Power Corporation of Canada
- Anthony Graham (1962–68), investment banker and chairman of Wittington Investments
- Vincenzo Guzzo, cinema owner and Dragons' Den investor
- Conrad Harrington (1926), president of Royal Trust and chancellor of McGill University
- Stephen Leopold, real-estate executive and Watergate Committee investigator
- Eric Molson (1948), chairman of Molson Coors and chancellor of Concordia University
- Mark Pathy, investor and Axiom Mission 1 astronaut
- Michael D. Penner, chairman of Hydro-Québec 2014–18

Politics, public service and the military

- Egan Chambers, Progressive Conservative member of Parliament 1958–62
- James Campbell Clouston, Royal Navy commander, pier-master at the Dunkirk evacuation
- Charles "Bud" Drury (1924–29), brigadier, Liberal member of Parliament for Westmount 1962–78 and President of the Treasury Board
- Greg Fergus, Liberal member of Parliament and Speaker of the House of Commons 2023–25
- Victor Goldbloom (1937), pediatrician, Quebec cabinet minister and Commissioner of Official Languages
- Tiff Macklem, Governor of the Bank of Canada
- George Carlyle Marler, Quebec Liberal leader and federal Minister of Transport
- John McCallum, economist, Liberal cabinet minister and ambassador to China
- Michael Meighen (1945–53), senator and chancellor of McGill University
- Robert Moncel, lieutenant-general and Vice Chief of the Defence Staff
- Tom Pitfield (1993), senator
- Timothy Porteous (1946), director of the Canada Council
- John Kennett Starnes (1923–30), diplomat and first civilian head of the RCMP Security Service

Arts, letters, scholarship and media

- John Caird, theatre director (Les Misérables, Nicholas Nickleby)
- James de Beaujeu Domville (1948), Government Film Commissioner and chairman of the National Film Board of Canada
- John Glassco, poet and memoirist
- Michael Goldbloom (1969), publisher of the Montreal Gazette and Toronto Star, principal of Bishop's University
- Richard Goldbloom, pediatrician and chancellor of Dalhousie University
- Jonathan Kay (1985), journalist, editor of The Walrus
- W. C. J. Meredith, dean of law at McGill University
- Jacob Richler, journalist and restaurant critic
- Hazen Sise, architect
- Charles Taylor (1946), philosopher, Templeton Prize and Kyoto Prize laureate
- Ralph C. S. Walker (1959), philosopher, fellow of Magdalen College, Oxford

Sport

- Joel Anthony, NBA centre and two-time champion with the Miami Heat
- Angelo Esposito, ice hockey forward, 2007 first-round NHL draft pick
- Torrey Mitchell (2002), NHL forward with the Montreal Canadiens and other clubs
- Alex Moore, Olympic freestyle wrestler
- Jeff Russel (1910), football halfback, Canadian Football Hall of Fame

Teachers have included the poet Patrick Anderson (1940–46), the novelist Edward O. Phillips (1960–65) and the Monarchist League founder John Aimers (1974–78).

The school appears in Mordecai Richler's 1980 novel Joshua Then and Now, in which, as the critic André Furlani notes, a rector's address at "the posh private school Selwyn House makes a mockery of idealism"; Richler's son Jacob was a pupil in the 1980s. The 2008 teen comedy Prom Wars, written by the former pupil Myles Hainsworth, concerns a rivalry between two Montreal boys' schools, "Selby House" and "Lancaster College", loosely based on Selwyn House and Lower Canada College, over the girls of a neighbouring school, ACS, loosely based on ECS, and was filmed partly at Selwyn House.

== See also ==
- Lower Canada College
- Education in Quebec
