= List of hospitals in Montreal =

This is a list of hospitals in Montreal, Quebec, Canada

There are fewer than 40 hospitals located in the City of Montreal. Many of them are also medical research facilities and teaching schools affiliated with universities.

== McGill University-affiliated hospitals ==
Hospitals affiliated with McGill University:

- Lakeshore General Hospital
- Jewish General Hospital
- St. Mary's Hospital
- Douglas Mental Health University Institute
- Shriners Hospital for Children

=== McGill University Health Centre ===
Hospitals part of the McGill University Health Centre healthcare network:

- Glen superhospital
  - Royal Victoria Hospital
  - Montreal Children's Hospital
  - Montreal Chest Institute
- Montreal General Hospital
  - Allan Memorial Institute (contains MGH's outpatient psychiatry)
- Montreal Neurological Hospital
- Hôpital de Lachine

== Université de Montréal-affiliated hospitals ==
Hospitals affiliated with Université de Montréal:

- Centre hospitalier de l'Université de Montréal
- Hôpital de Verdun
- Hopital Notre-Dame
- Hôpital Maisonneuve-Rosemont
- Hôpital du Sacré-Coeur de Montréal
  - Hôpital en santé mentale Albert-Prévost
- Centre hospitalier universitaire Sainte-Justine
- Institut de cardiologie de Montréal
- Institut universitaire en santé mentale de Montréal
- Institut Philippe-Pinel de Montréal
- Hôpital Fleury
- Hôpital Santa-Cabrini
- Hôpital de LaSalle
- Hôpital Jean-Talon
- Hôpital Rivière-des-Prairies

== Closed hospitals ==
- Hôtel-Dieu de Montréal, (1645–2017), currently houses administrative offices and COVID-19 test site
- Hôpital Saint-Luc (1908–2017)
- Montreal Chinese Hospital, currently a long term care home for Chinese speakers since the 1970s
- Doctor's Hospital (1949–1971), opened with 25 beds, high of 65 beds around 1965. Addresses listed as 6481 Cote-des-Neiges until 1960, 6733 thereafter. Known to hire immigrant and Jewish doctors at a time when many hospitals refused to.
- Grey Nuns' Hospital (1695–1880)
- Herbert Reddy Memorial Hospital (1946-1970s), Reddy Memorial Hospital (1970s-1997)
- Western Hospital of Montreal (XXXX-1924)
- Montreal Homeopathic Hospital (1894–1951)
- Queen Elizabeth Hospital of Montreal (1951–1995), currently a family medicine clinic
- Hôpital de la Miséricorde (1853–1974), was renamed Hôpital Jacques-Viger and operated as a long-term care hospital from 1975 to 2012, vacant since 2012
- Hôpital Ste-Jeanne-d'Arc (1920–1996), established in 1919 as Hôpital Français
- Hôpital Bellechasse(1962–1997), Transformed into social housing.

== See also ==
- List of hospitals in Canada
