= Hôpital du Sacré-Cœur de Montréal =

Hospital in Montreal, Quebec, Canada

- CIUSSS du Nord-de-L’Île-de-Montréal
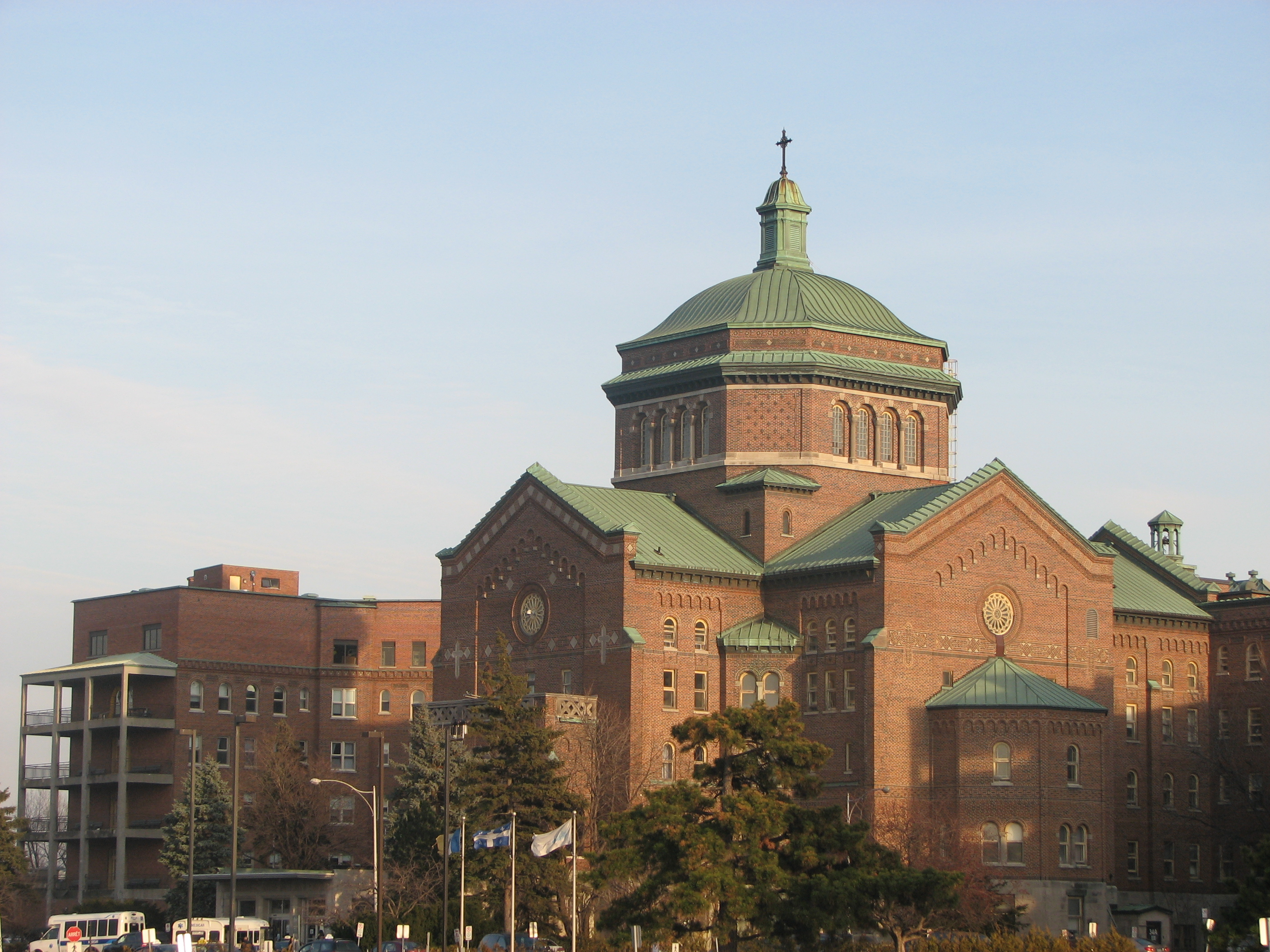

- Location in Montreal

Geography
- Location: 5400, boulevard Gouin Ouest; Montreal, Quebec, Canada; H4J 1C5
- Coordinates: 45.5324°N 73.7144°W

Organisation
- Care system: RAMQ (Quebec medicare)
- Type: District General
- Affiliated university: Université de Montréal Faculty of Medicine

Services
- Emergency department: Level I Trauma Centre
- Beds: 554

Helipads
- Helipad: TC LID: CSZ8

History
- Founded: June 1, 1898

Links
- Website: www.hscm.ca

The Hôpital du Sacré-Cœur de Montréal is a district general hospital in the Cartierville neighbourhood of Montreal, Quebec, Canada, bordering on Saint-Laurent.

It is one of the largest teaching hospitals affiliated with the Université de Montréal, and one of the largest hospitals in Quebec. It is one of only three hospitals in the province with a Level 1 Trauma Centre.

== History ==
In downtown Montreal on June 1, 1898, the day of the Feast of the Sacred Heart, a group of women founded a small hospital named Hôpital du Sacré-Cœur de Montréal to care for a dozen ill individuals deemed the "incurables".

In 1902, the administration of the hospital was taken over by the Sisters of Providence, and a new building with 375 beds was built on Décarie Boulevard; it was known as Hôpital des Incurables. The building was destroyed by fire in March 1923, and in 1926 a new building was built on Gouin Boulevard in Cartierville, where it still stands today. With the new building, the administration reverted to using the original name, Hôpital du Sacré-Cœur de Montréal.

The new hospital was initially focused on the treatment of tuberculosis. Considered a sanatorium, it became an important teaching hospital for pulmonary illness. In 1931, Édouard Samson founded the orthopedics department, which eventually became the largest institution for training orthopedic surgeons in the province of Quebec.

In 1973, the Hôpital du Sacré-Coeur de Montréal was affiliated with the Université de Montréal as its medical and health-sciences teaching hospital. The Albert-Prévost Institute merged with the hospital to form a centre for psychiatric patients.

== See also ==
- Centre hospitalier universitaire de Montréal (CHUM)
- McGill University Health Centre
- Montreal General Hospital
- McGill University Faculty of Medicine
  - Montreal Chest Institute
  - Montreal Children's Hospital
  - Montreal Neurological Institute
  - Royal Victoria Hospital
  - St. Mary's Hospital
  - Jewish General Hospital
