= Centre hospitalier universitaire Sainte-Justine =

Hospital in Montreal, Quebec, Canada

CHU Sainte-Justine
- Université de Montréal Faculty of Medicine
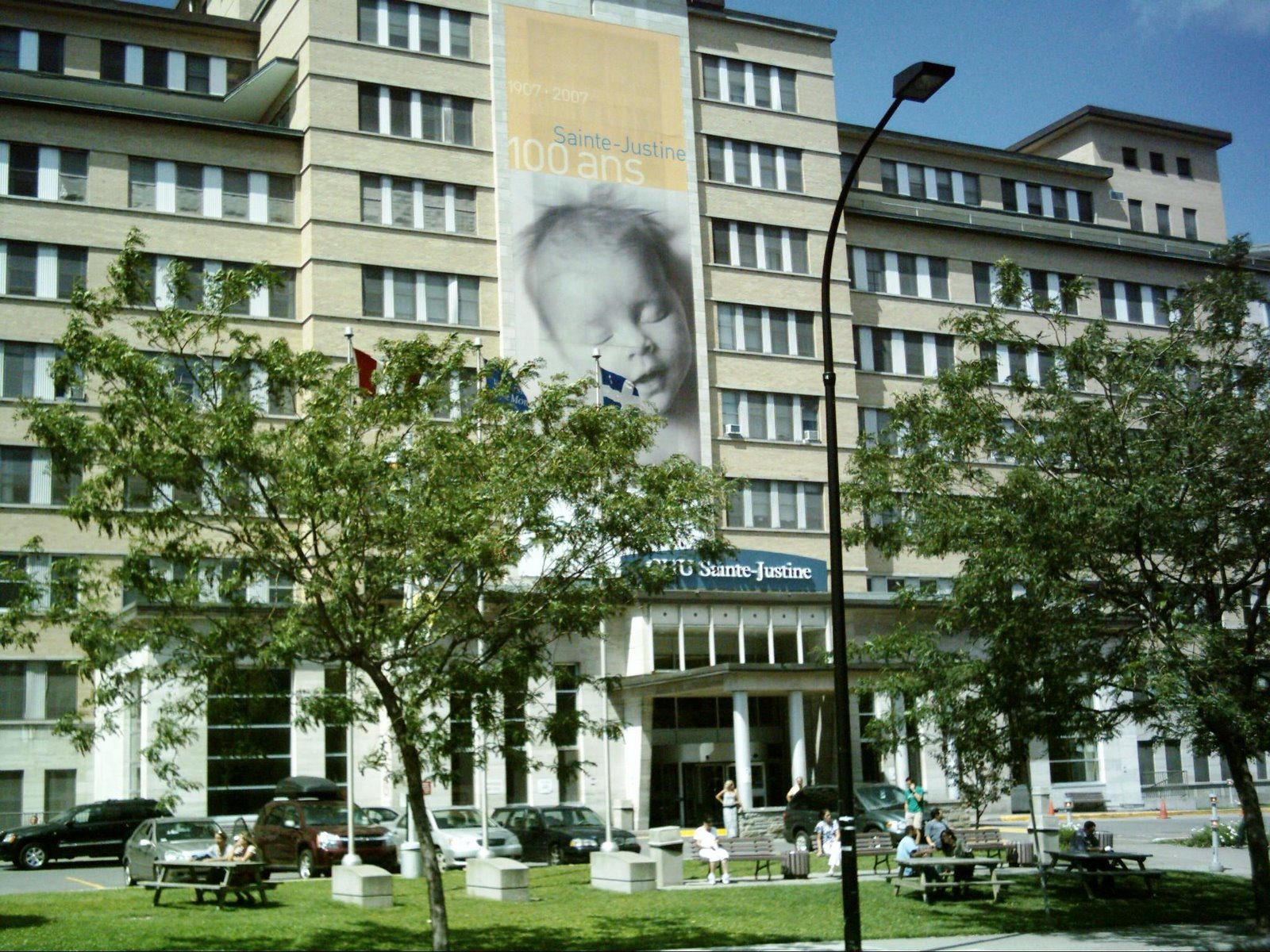

- Location in Montreal

Geography
- Location: 3175, chemin de la Côte-Sainte-Catherine; Montreal, Quebec, Canada; H3T 1C5
- Coordinates: 45.5031°N 73.6244°W

Organisation
- Care system: RAMQ (Quebec medicare)
- Type: Specialist
- Affiliated university: Faculté de médecine - Université de Montréal

Services
- Emergency department: Level 1 paediatric trauma centre
- Beds: 417 (main site) + 67 (Marie-Enfant site)
- Speciality: Paediatrics; Obstetrics

History
- Founded: 1907, 1957 (current site)

Links
- Website: http://www.chusj.org/en/Home

The Centre hospitalier universitaire Sainte-Justine (CHU Sainte-Justine) is the largest mother and child centre in Canada. It is affiliated with the Université de Montréal, located in Montreal, Quebec, Canada.

Founded in 1907 by Justine Lacoste-Beaubien and Dr Irma Levasseur, the CHU Sainte-Justine is currently the largest paediatric health centre in Canada. With its 550 beds, of which 30 are in the intensive care unit, it receives 19,000 inpatients yearly. The centre employs 520 doctors and 4500 medical students and residents.

The CHU officially became a university health centre in 1995 and has since welcomed around 2500 medical students yearly. It has also been home to a research centre since 1973. In 2000, the Centre de réadaptation Marie-Enfant, the only paediatric rehabilitation centre in Quebec, became affiliated with the CHU Sainte-Justine.

The institution underwent a major expansion in 2018, under the project "Grandir en Santé". This extension has increased the centre's total area by 65%.

The CHU is a Level 1 paediatric trauma centre, receiving children from all over Quebec for paediatric liver transplantation, paediatric craniofacial surgery, and paediatric burn surgery. Tertiary and quaternary care in paediatrics and obstetrics includes all specialties in paediatric surgery, including cardiac, vascular and neurosurgery, as well as all paediatric specialties, including organ transplantation, oncology, hematology and child psychiatry. It is also the provincial reference centre for the detection of deafness, management of chronic pain and developmental disorders in children.

Although a mother-child institution, it does not have the medical capacity to care for those mothers who require intensive care management. As such, these mothers are required to be transferred to other institutions on the Montreal island, such as: McGill University Health Centre (MUHC), Hôpital Maisonneuve Rosemont, Jewish General Hospital or Centre hospitalier de l'Université de Montréal.

== Gallery ==
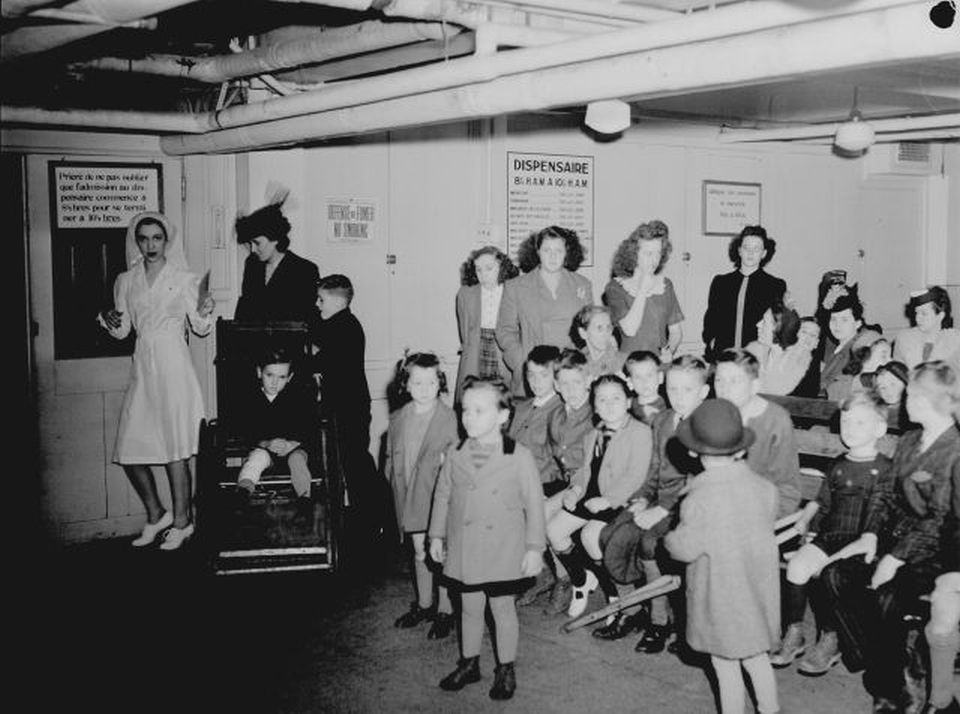
CHU Sainte-Justine in May 1945

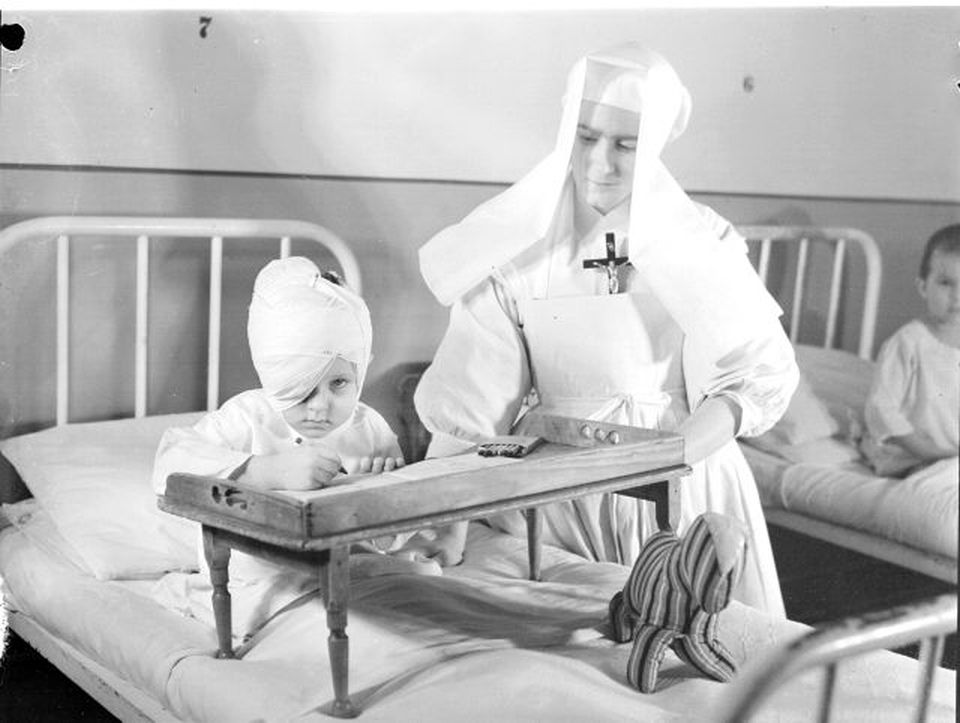
Child and a nun at the hospital, 1945

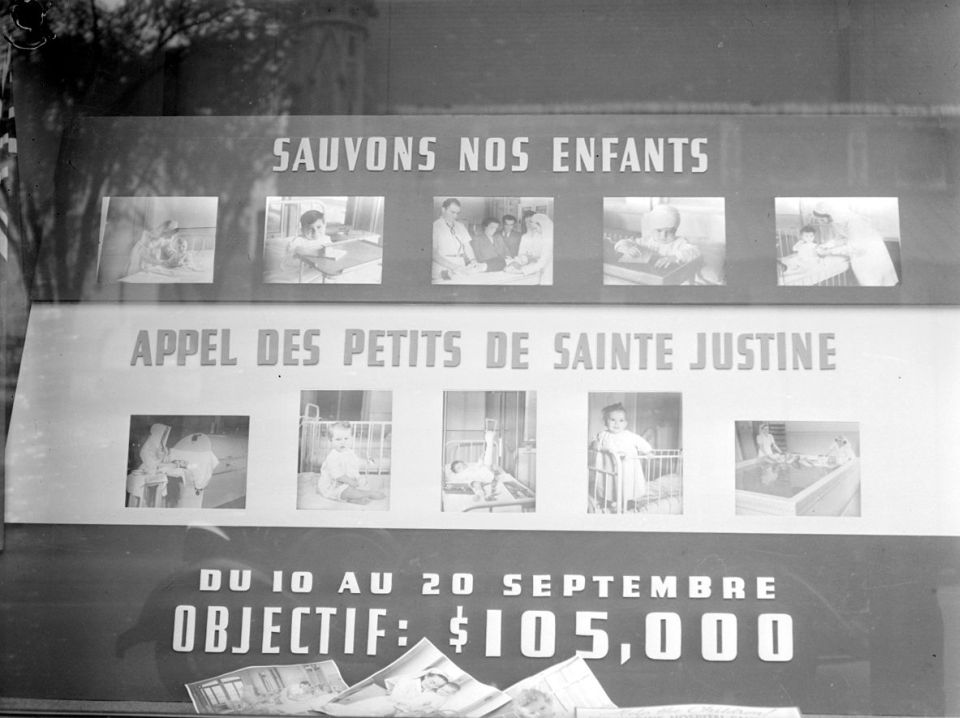
1945 Fundraising

== See also ==
- Centre hospitalier universitaire de Montreal (CHUM)
- Montreal Children's Hospital
- Shriners Hospital for Children – Canada, also located in Montreal
