= Herbert Melville Little =

Canadian gynaecologist and lecturer in obstetrics and gynaecology

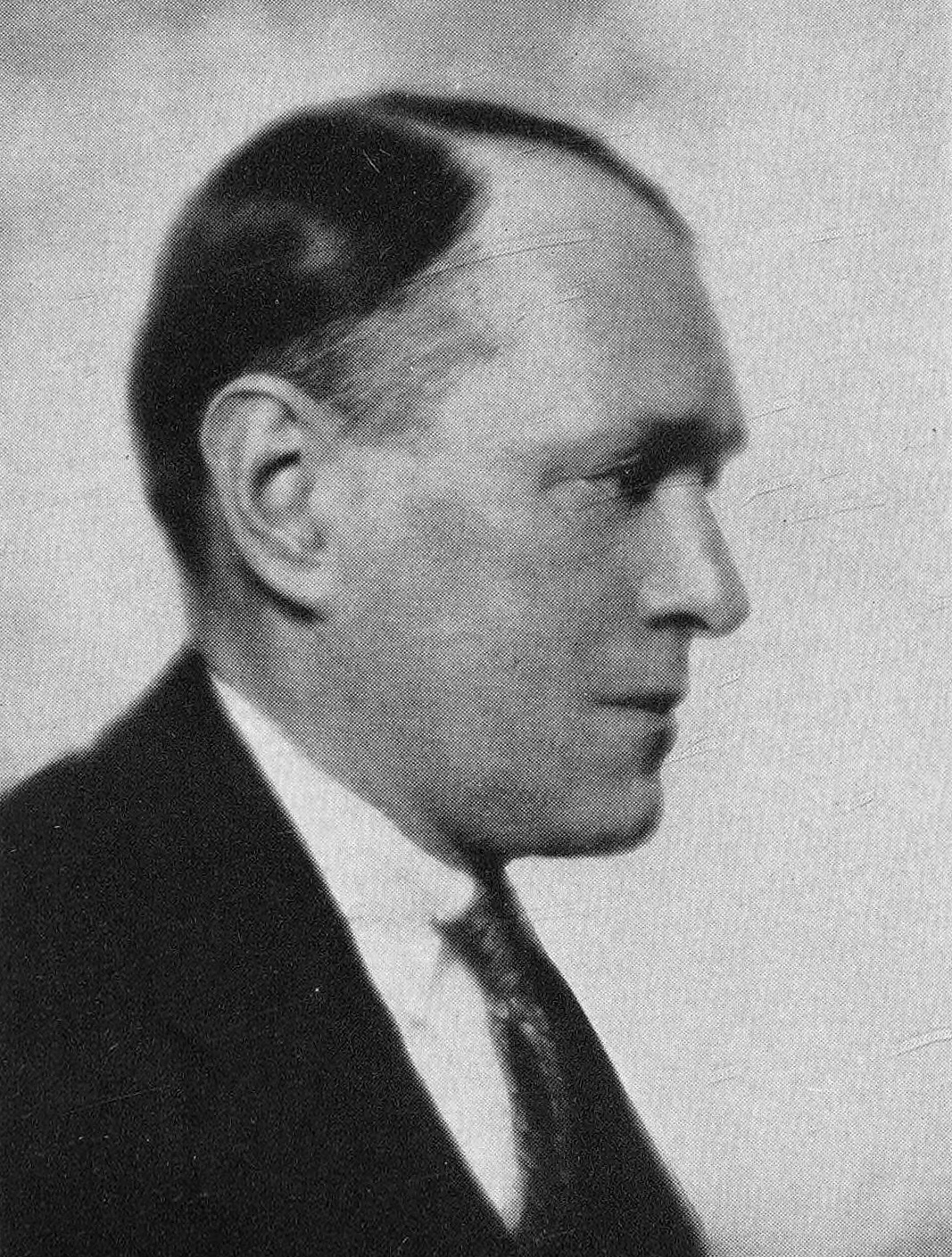
Little in an undated photograph

Herbert Melville Little FRCOG (December 11, 1877 – October 11, 1934) was a Canadian gynaecologist and lecturer in obstetrics and gynaecology at McGill University.

He was born in London, Ontario. He completed his undergraduate studies at the University of Toronto in 1897 and graduated in medicine from McGill in 1901.

During World War I, he was an Army captain, serving as paymaster and adjutant with the McGill Unit 3rd Canadian General Hospital.

He was assistant gynaecologist at the Montreal General Hospital and from 1925 gynaecologist-in-chief there. He was a foundation fellow of the Royal College of Obstetricians and Gynaecologists.
