= Montreal Children's Hospital =

Children's hospital in Quebec, Canada

Montreal Children's Hospital Hôpital de Montréal pour enfants
- McGill University Health Centre

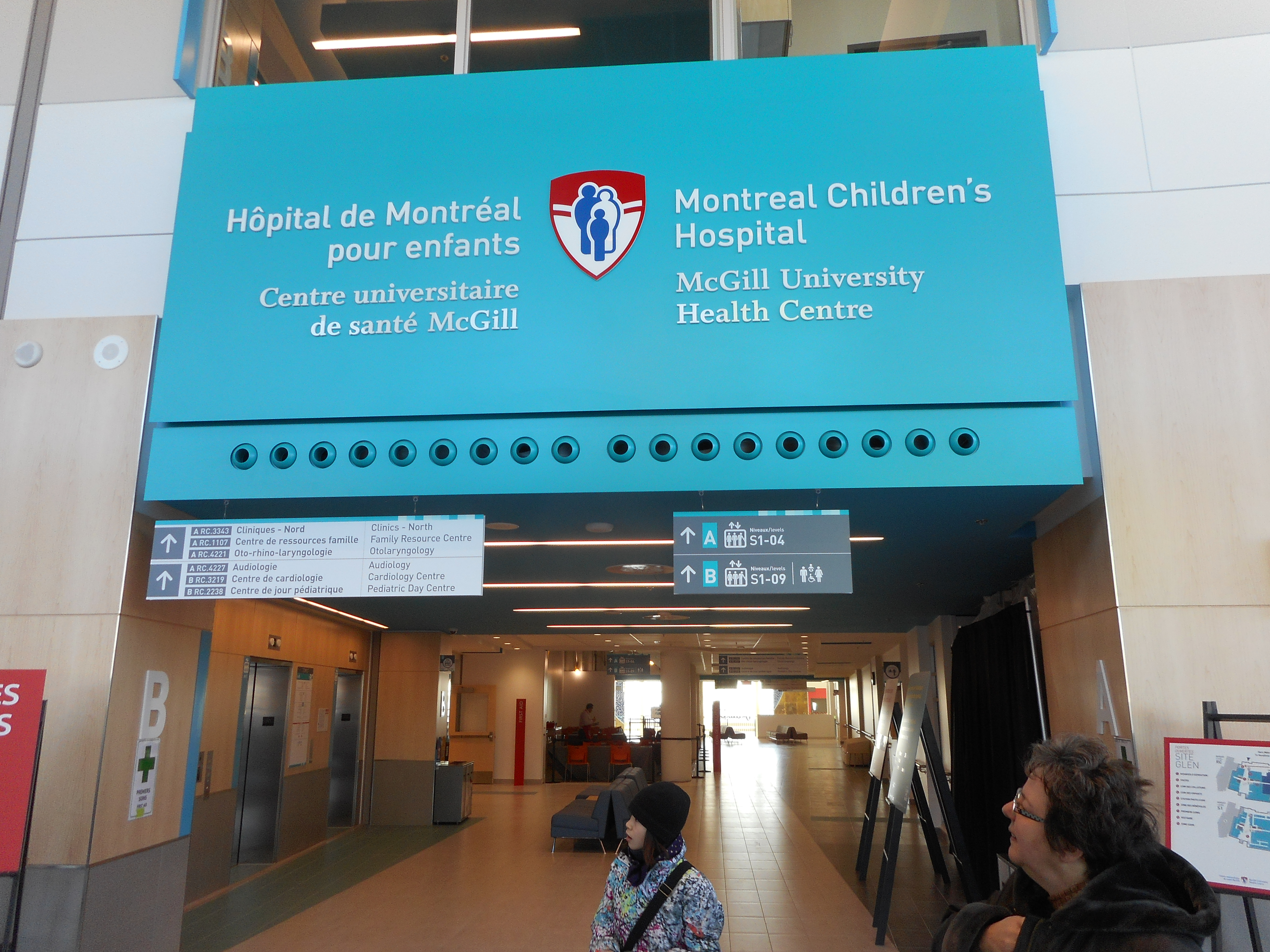
- At the Glen Site

- Location in Montreal

Geography
- Location: 1001 Décarie Boulevard, Montreal, Quebec, Canada
- Coordinates: 45.48878°N 73.582091°W

Organization
- Care system: RAMQ (Quebec medicare)
- Type: Teaching
- Affiliated university: McGill University Faculty of Medicine
- Network: McGill University Health Centre

Services
- Emergency department: Yes
- Beds: 154
- Speciality: Pediatric hospital

History
- Founded: 1904

Links
- Website: https://montrealchildrenshospital.ca/
- Lists: Hospitals in Canada

The Montreal Children's Hospital (French: Hôpital de Montréal pour enfants) is a pediatric hospital in Montreal, Quebec, Canada. Founded in 1904, it is affiliated with the McGill University Health Centre (MUHC) and McGill University, Faculty of Medicine.

The hospital has 154 single-patient rooms, 52-bed neonatology unit, 6 operating rooms and 6 intervention rooms. It has two blocks. Block A has pediatric outpatient services. Block B has pediatric inpatient units, which include a Neonatal Intensive Care Unit (NICU) and a Pediatric Intensive Care Unit (PICU). It houses a pediatric emergency department, operating rooms and perioperative services, a day hospital and allied health services.

Services are available in French and English, as well as in over 300 other languages through interpretation services.

== History ==
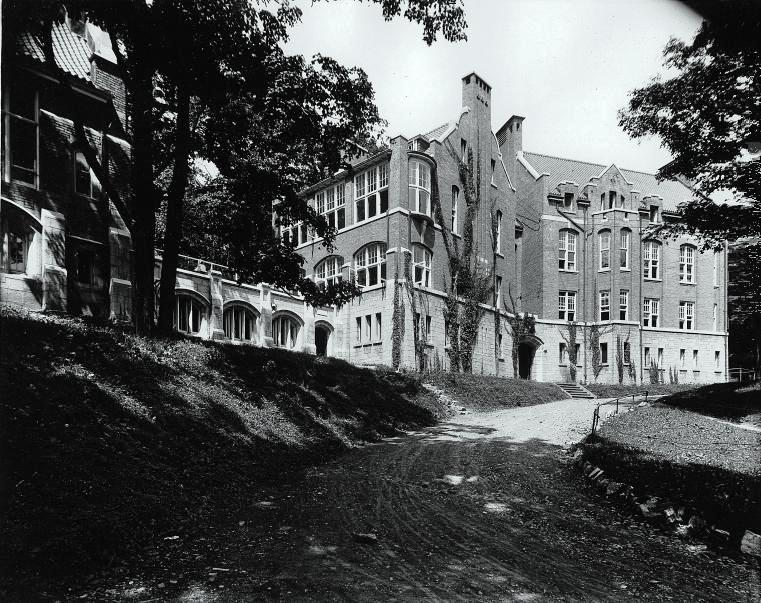
The Children's Memorial Hospital on Cedar Avenue in 1913

The Montreal Children's Hospital (MCH) first opened on the rented premise of 500 Guy Street on January 30, 1904. It was the first hospital in Montreal with the sole mandate of providing care for sick children. In 1909, the growing number of patients required a move to new premises on Cedar Avenue, designed by David Robertson Brown (1869–1946). In 1920, the hospital became a teaching hospital affiliated with McGill University.

The hospital has achieved a number of "firsts", including the first speech clinic in a pediatric hospital in 1933, the first division of medical genetics in 1949 and the first department of psychiatry in 1950. The neonatology division was the first to create a neonatal transport team in Québec, dedicated to the ground transportation of unstable newborns. As well, in 1991, the neonatology division created the first provincial extracorporeal membrane oxygenation (ECMO) program to assist neonates with severe respiratory distress and pulmonary hypertension. The Montreal Children's Hospital, affiliated to McGill University, was the first to create training programs for nurse practitioners in neonatology and pediatrics. It is now home to the only training programs for neonatal hemodynamics, neonatal follow-up and neonatal scholar in the province of Quebec. The increasing number of services required another expansion. A relocation took place to 2300 Tupper Street in 1956, and it was renamed the Montreal Children's Hospital.

In August 1997, the Montreal Children's Hospital merged with the Royal Victoria Hospital, the Montreal General Hospital, the Montreal Neurological Institute and Hospital and the Montreal Chest Institute to form the McGill University Health Centre.

The location of the Montreal Children's Hospital at 2300 Tupper Street officially closed at 11:00 on May 24, 2015, after 78 patients were transferred to the new Glen Site at 1001 Décarie Boulevard. The new Glen Site Montreal Children's Hospital opened its emergency doors at 5 a.m. The Glen Site is composed of different hospital centres. Since the move to the Glen site, the Montreal Children's Hospital and the Royal Victoria Hospital have the capacity to provide on-site advanced maternal and perinatal care, such as ex-utero intrapartum treatment. The Glen site is the only centre on the island of Montreal with fully array of ultraspecialized care (including fetal interventions, ECMO, dialysis, neurology, neurosurgery, extreme prematurity care, emergency care, cardiology and cardiac surgery) for both adults and children.

The Montreal Children's Hospital is a tertiary and quaternary care teaching and research facility and serves 63 per cent of the geographic population of Quebec. The hospital is a provincially designated trauma centre and has a pediatric transport team for children in critical state.

Due to its pediatric care and research facilities being adjacent to the adult facility on the Glen site, the Children’s Hospital offers services and research across the lifespan. Its researchers conduct clinical trials on the hospital site at the Centre for Innovative Medicine - one of the Research Institute of the McGill University Health Centre’s research facilities and the only clinical research centre in a hospital setting in North America.

In 2011, it was the first pediatric hospital in Quebec to use high-frequency jet ventilation in the context of neonatal respiratory failure. It also has a strong tradition of pediatric and neonatal research, with some laboratories doing translational work in the clinical context, such as: the NeoCardioLab, the NeoBrainLab, the Neonatal Health Systems Research, the abcdResearch lab and the Smart Hospital Project.

== Gallery ==
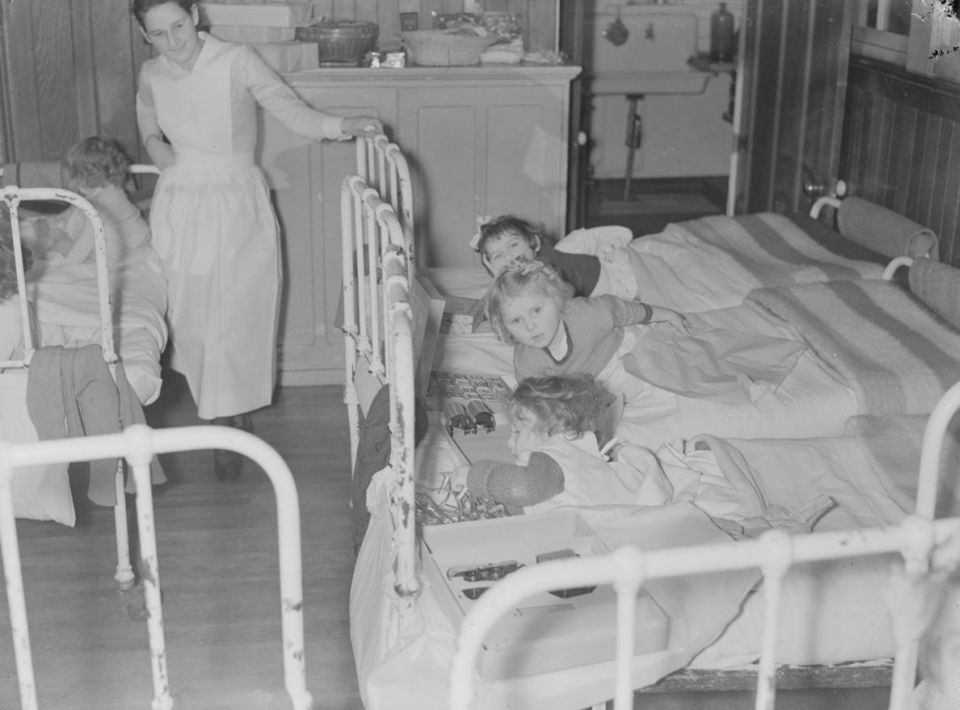
Girls bedridden, 1938

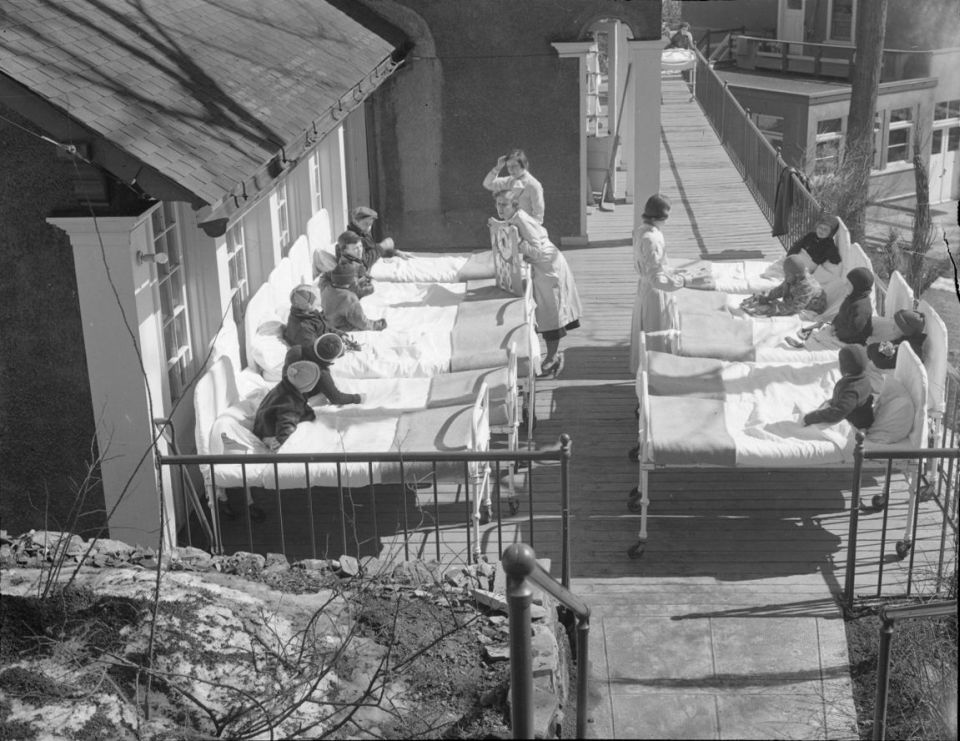
Children bedridden outside, 1938

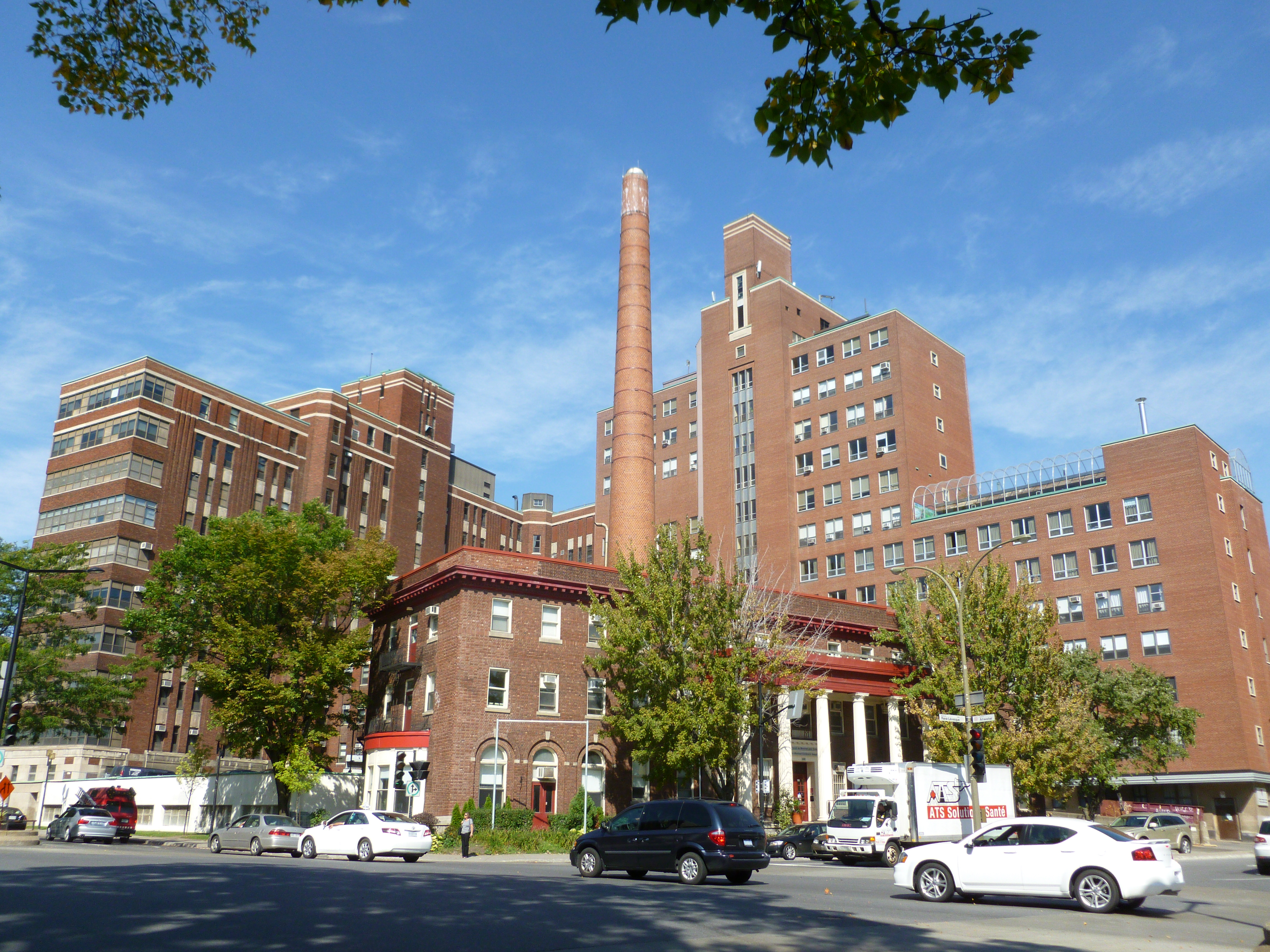
2300 Tupper Street

== See also ==
- Montreal's other pediatric hospitals:
  - Centre hospitalier universitaire Sainte-Justine
  - Shriners Hospital for Children – Canada
