= Montreal General Hospital =

Hospital in Quebec, Canada

Montreal General Hospital Hôpital général de Montréal
- McGill University Health Centre
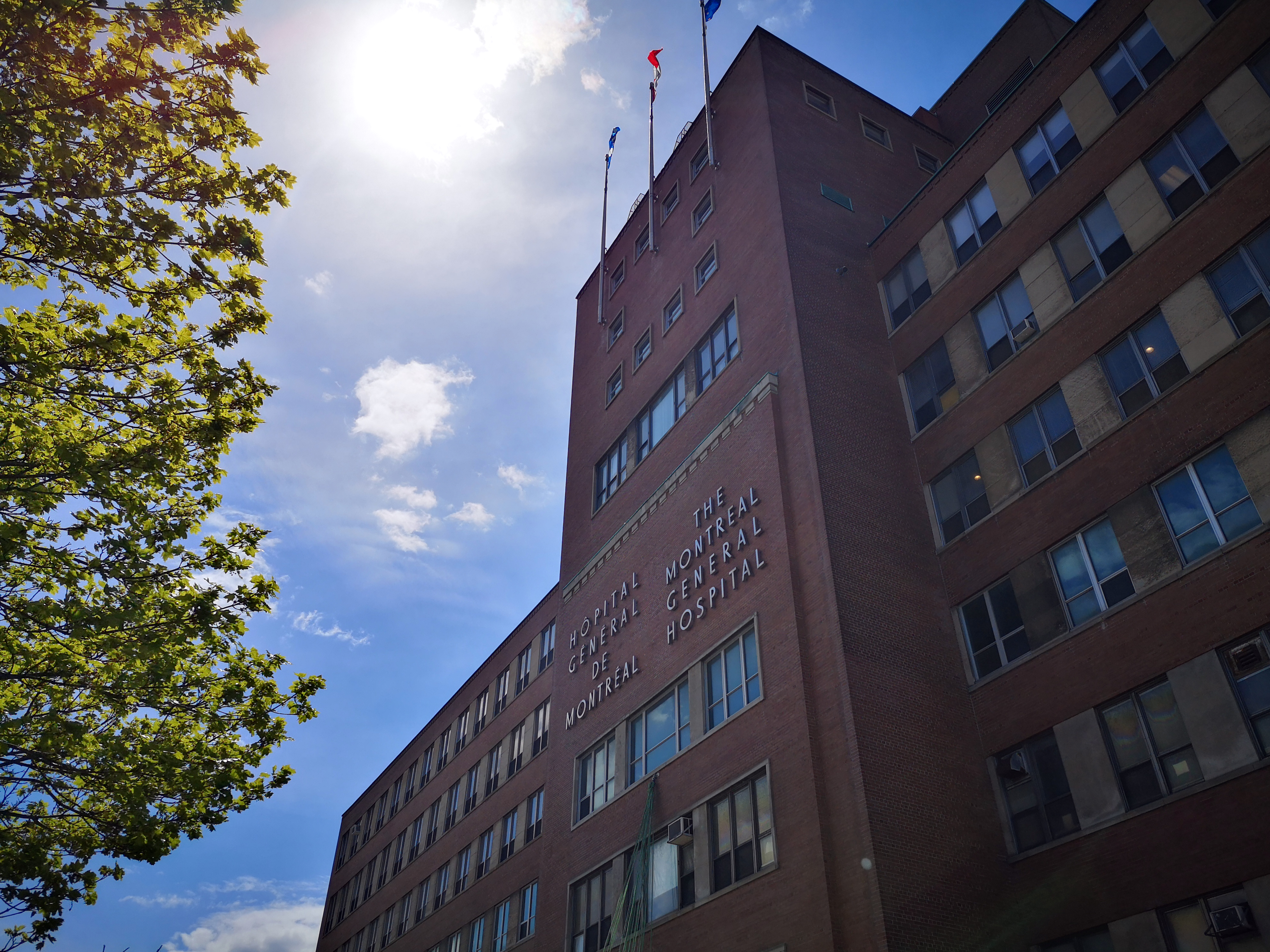
- As seen from Pine Avenue

- Location in Montreal

Geography
- Location: 1650, avenue Cedar; Montreal, Quebec; H3G 1A4
- Coordinates: 45.4973°N 73.5885°W

Organisation
- Care system: RAMQ (Quebec medicare)
- Type: Teaching
- Affiliated university: McGill University Faculty of Medicine
- Network: McGill University Health Centre

Services
- Emergency department: Level I trauma centre
- Beds: 479
- Speciality: General medicine, Surgery, Trauma, Orthopedics, Psychiatry, Thoracic Surgery

History
- Founded: 1822

Links
- Website: https://muhc.ca/mgh

The Montreal General Hospital (MGH; French: Hôpital général de Montréal) is a hospital in Montreal, Quebec, Canada. It was established between 1818 and 1820, and received its charter in 1823. Affiliated with McGill University since 1832, the MGH was one of the first teaching hospitals. In 1997, it merged with the Royal Victoria Hospital, the Montreal Children's Hospital, and The Neuro to become part of the McGill University Health Centre (MUHC).

The MGH is located on Cedar Avenue at the foot of Mount Royal. It has six pavilions: A, B, C, D, E and Livingston (L) as well as the section known as the T-Wing (the T stands for Travancore). Some of The Institute's research facilities are located in the L pavilion.

The MGH has been designated by the Quebec government as one of three Level I trauma centres in the province (the others being the Hôpital du Sacré-Cœur de Montréal and Hôpital de l'Enfant-Jésus in Quebec City) and it is the only one in downtown Montreal.

The MGH has been affiliated with McGill since 1832 and was one of the first teaching hospitals.

In Newsweek's 2026 rankings of the world's best hospitals, the MGH was ranked 5th in Canada and was the highest ranked in Quebec.

== History ==
Fundraising to establish an English hospital in Montreal was undertaken between 1818 and 1820 after an initial petition for a new public hospital was accidentally denied by the lowest level of the colonial government of Lower Canada at the time, the House of Assembly. The growing needs of the English-speaking population led to several charities, among them the Female Benevolent Society of Montreal and the Society for the Relief of Immigrants, to ask for help in building a new hospital. At the time, Montreal had two hospitals: the Grey Nuns' Hospital and the Hôtel-Dieu de Montréal.

In 1819, enough money had been received to lease a building on Craig Street to accommodate 24 patients and this small hospital opened on May 1, 1819. By 1820, enough money had been donated or pledged (subscribed) by supporters to purchase property on Dorchester and St Dominique streets. The cornerstone of the new Montreal General Hospital was laid in 1821, and the 72-bed hospital building opened in 1822. The hospital received its first charter in 1823.

Famous Montreal beer-brewer John Molson and his three sons John Jr., Thomas, and William contributed to the hospital financially through the purchasing of the Dorchester Street lot and the construction of the main building itself. In 1819, John Molson was the presenter of the initial petition to the Legislative Assembly of Lower Canada (after being sick and seeking hospital care himself, he became personally invested) to create a new public hospital in Montreal. The petition was denied because of a procedural error, and the hospital became a privately funded institution.

At the same time four Edinburgh-trained physicians, Andrew Fernando Holmes, William Robertson, William Caldwell, and John Stephenson, were working to establish medical teaching in Montreal. They founded the Montreal Medical Institution in 1823 as a teaching unit of the hospital. In 1829, the Institution became part of McGill University, then known as McGill College. It was McGill's first faculty and Canada's first faculty of medicine.

On May 30, 1955, the Montreal General Hospital began operation at its present location at 1650 Cedar Avenue. It was officially opened on October 4, 1955 by Mary, Princess Royal and Countess of Harewood.

== Notable physicians ==
- Carl Goresky, his theoretical treatment of the transport of substances through intact organs led the basis for the understanding of events within the microvasculature
- Phil Gold, a physician and scientist. In 1968, he co-discovered with Samuel O. Freedman the carcinoembryonic antigen (CEA), which resulted in a blood test used in the diagnosis and management of people with cancer.
- Albert Moll, a psychiatrist who pioneered the day treatment of psychiatric patients.
- David Mulder, a physician and surgeon committed to the field of trauma and known as the primary physician for the Montreal Canadiens
- Ouida Ramón-Moliner, an anaesthetist who assisted Wilder Penfield perform awake crainotomies by keeping patients awake to locate where exactly there were suffering from epilepsy.

== Images ==
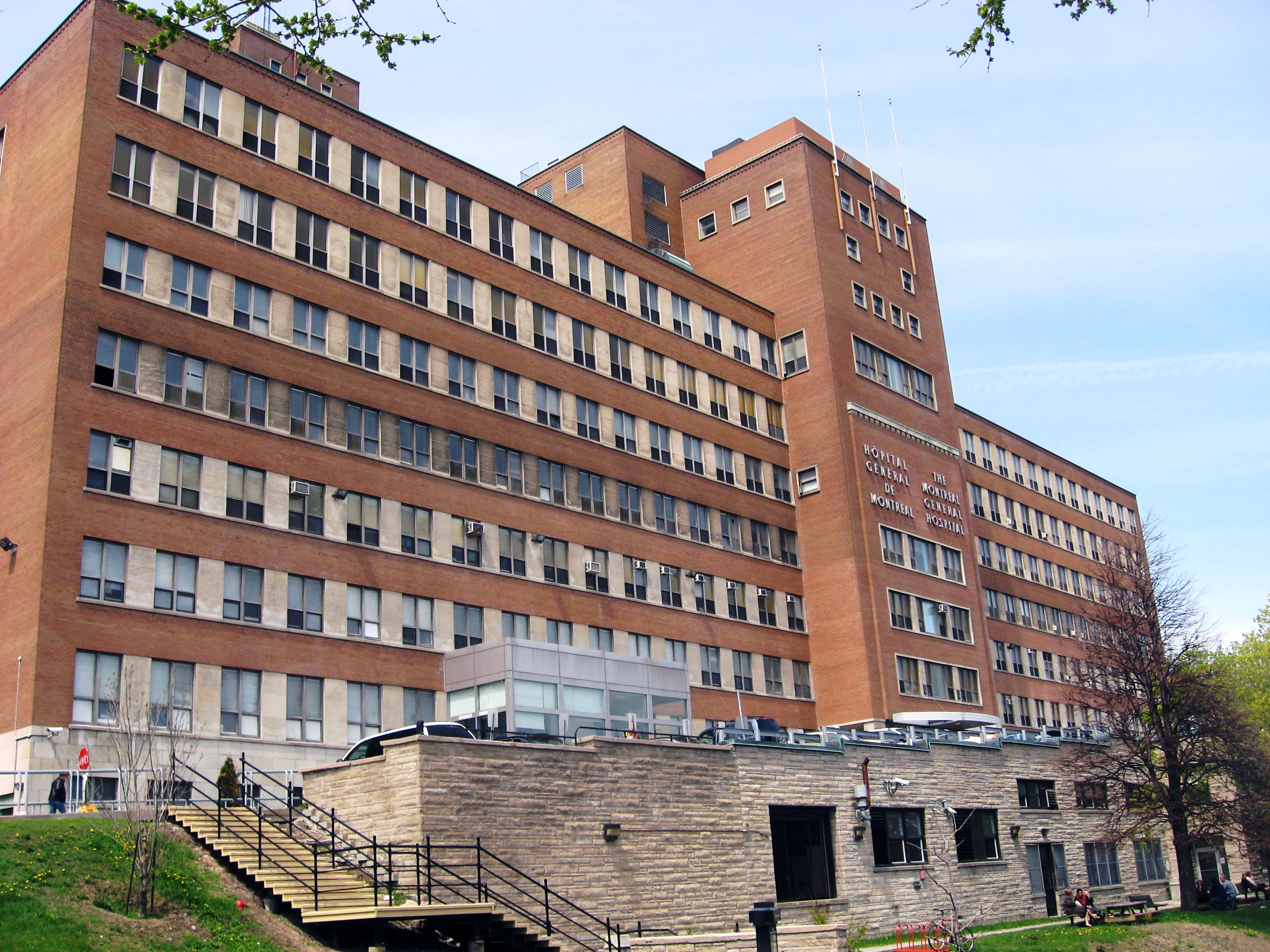

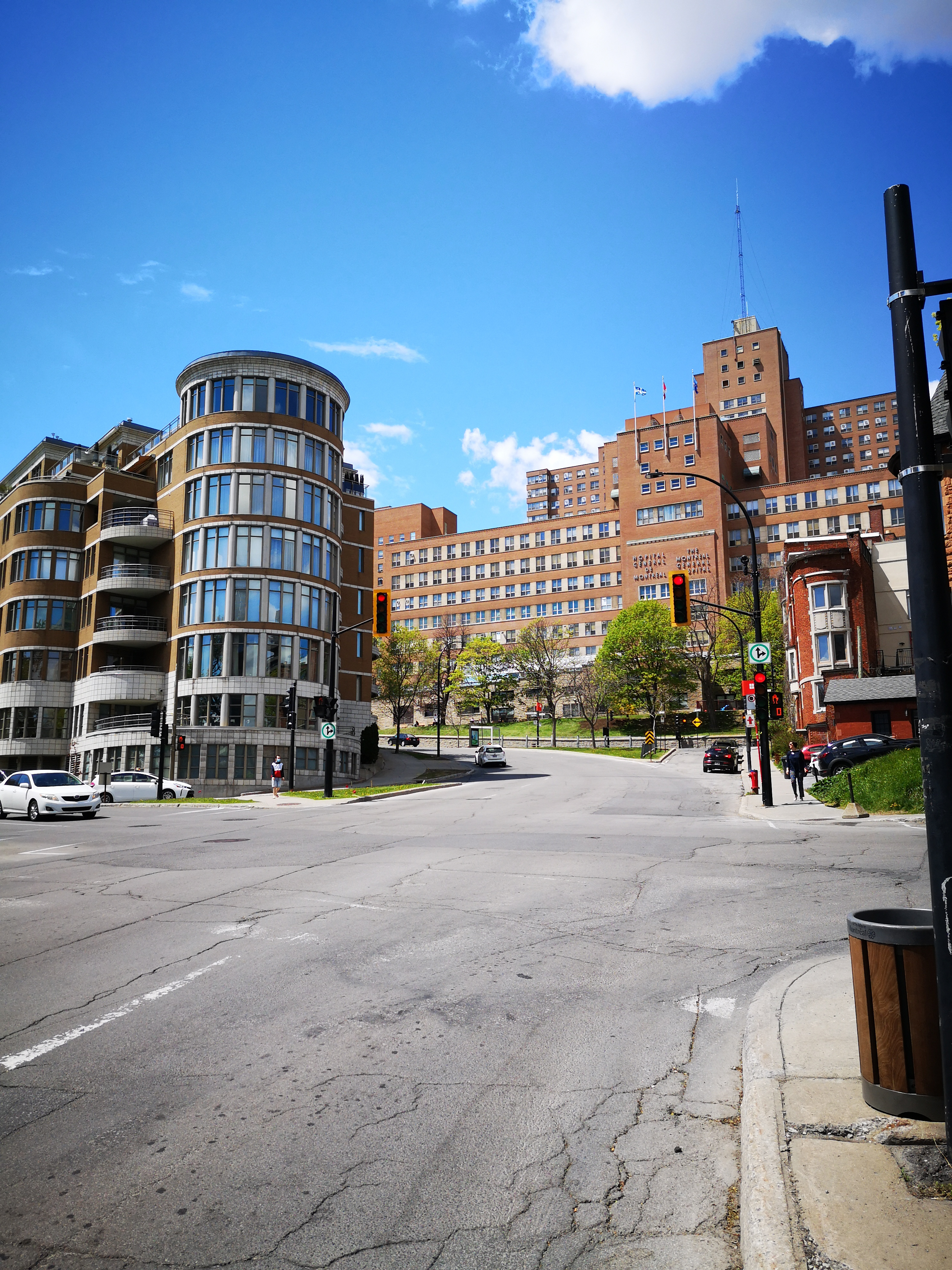

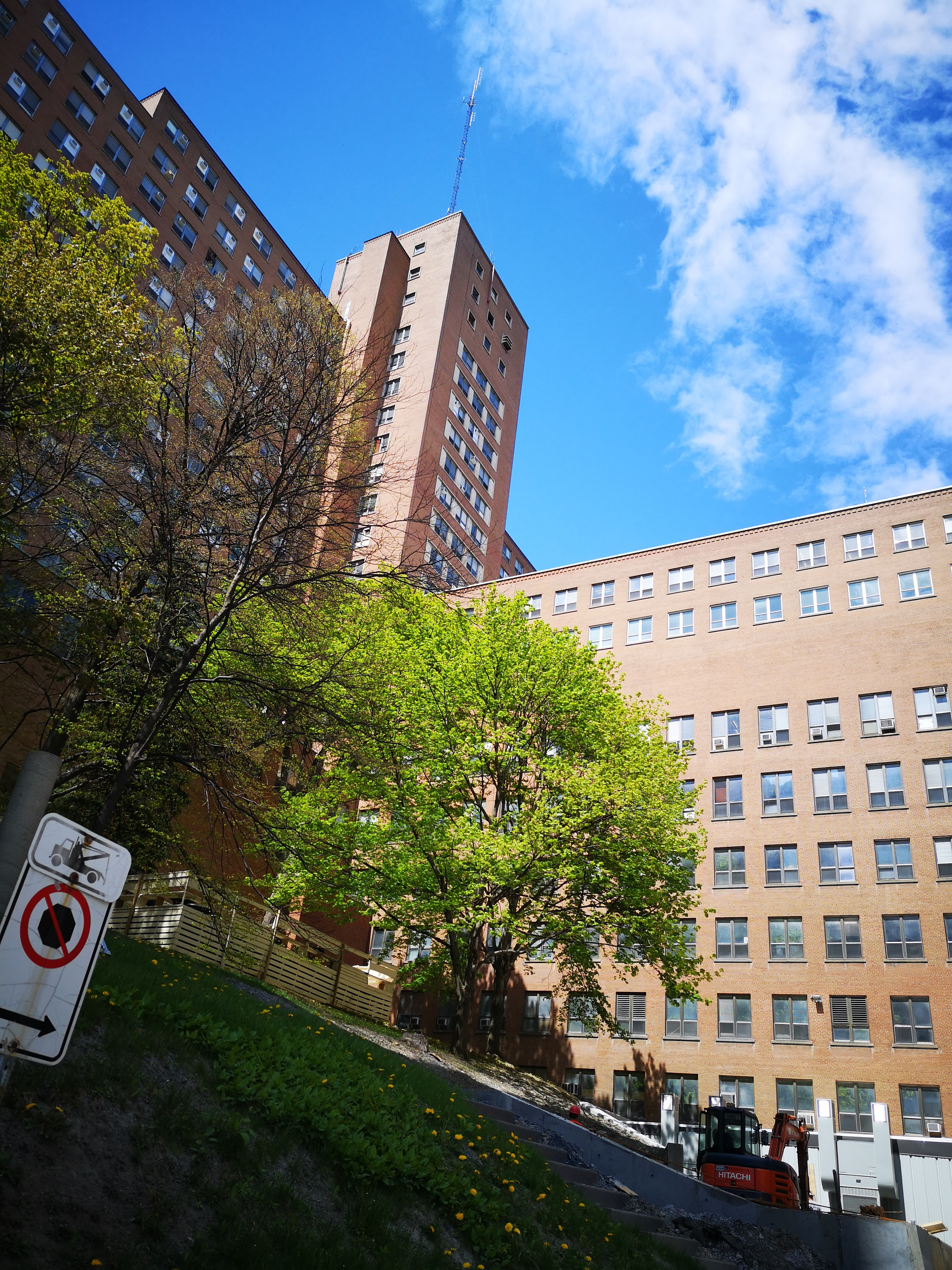

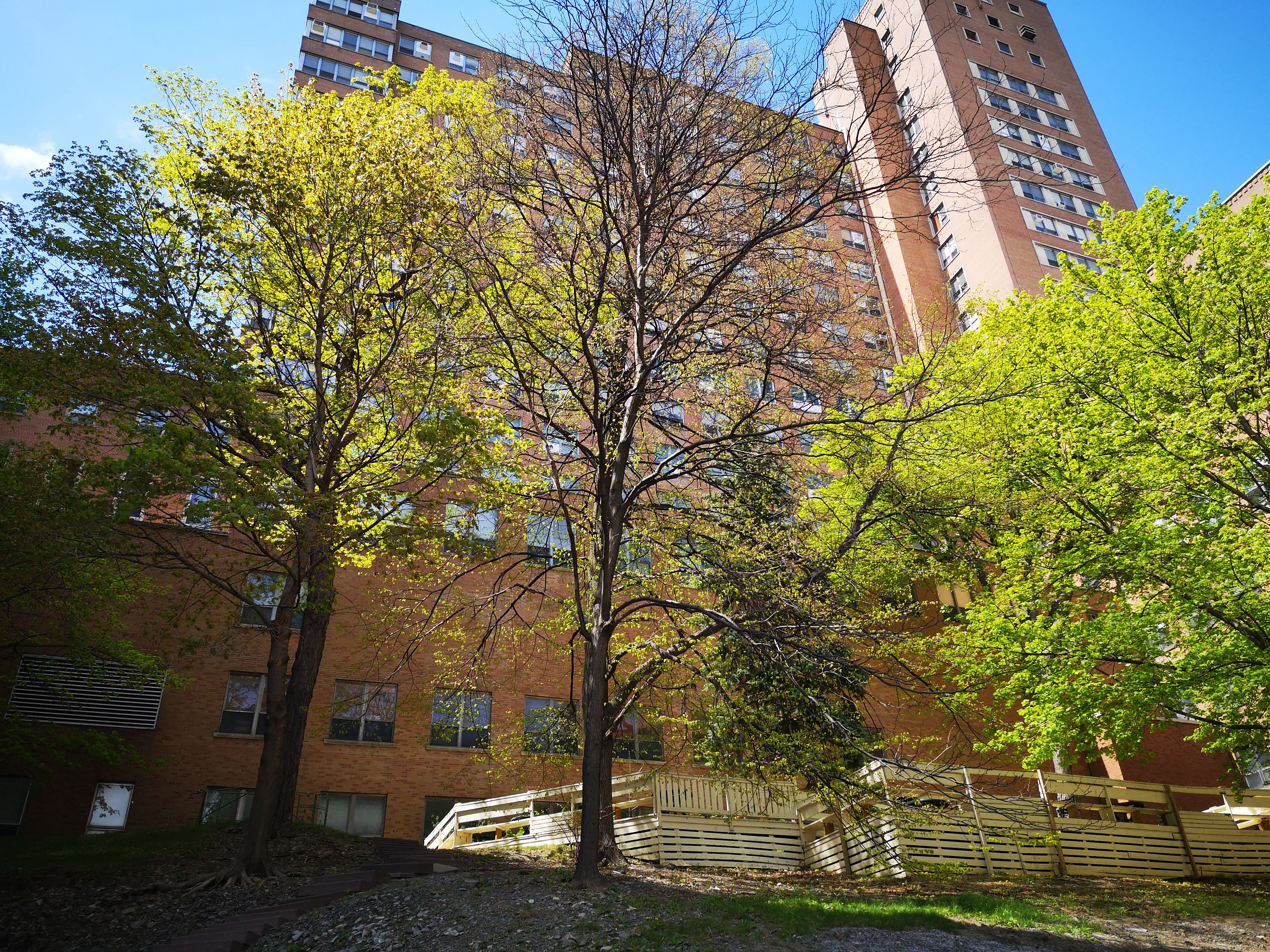

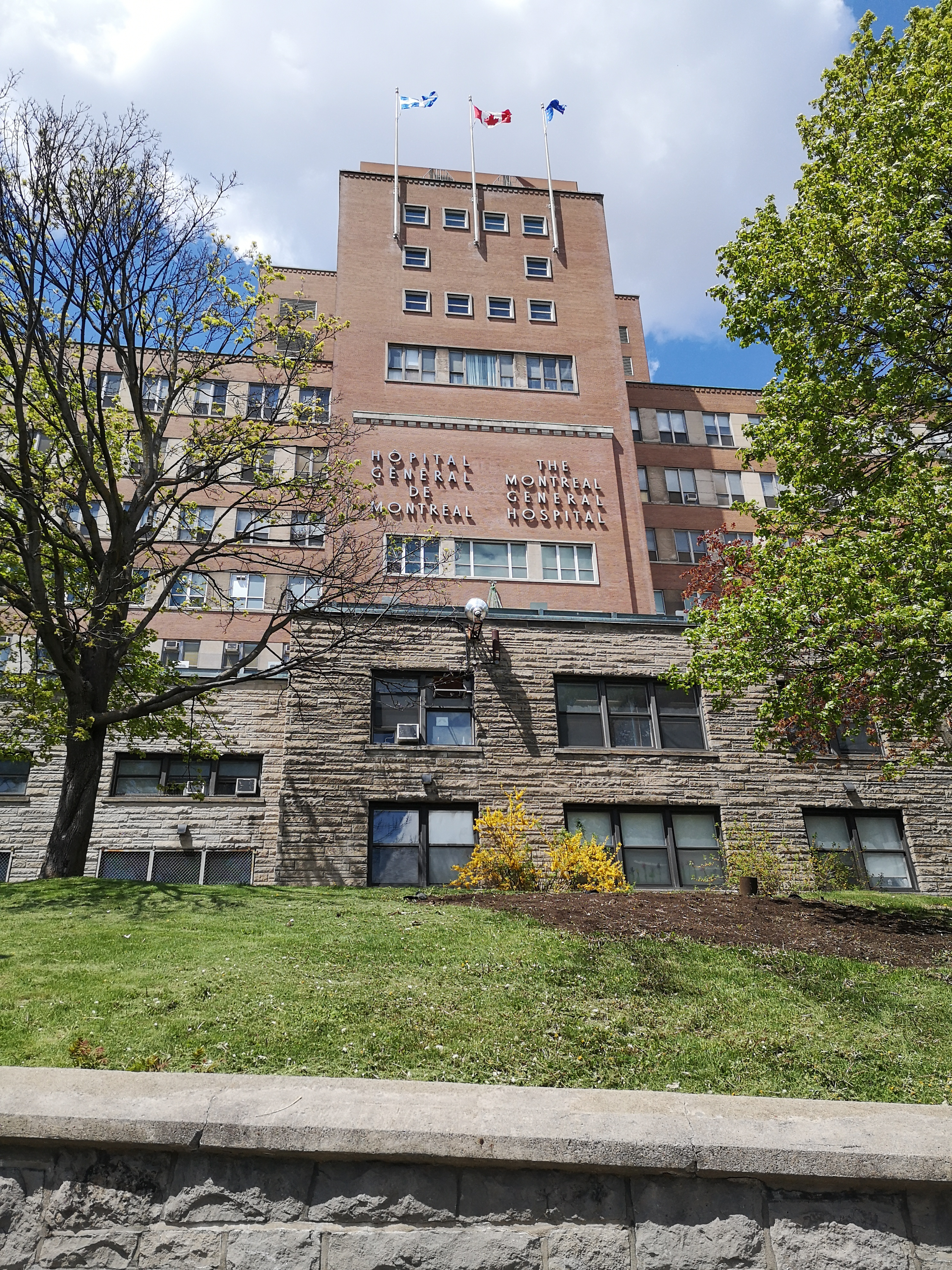

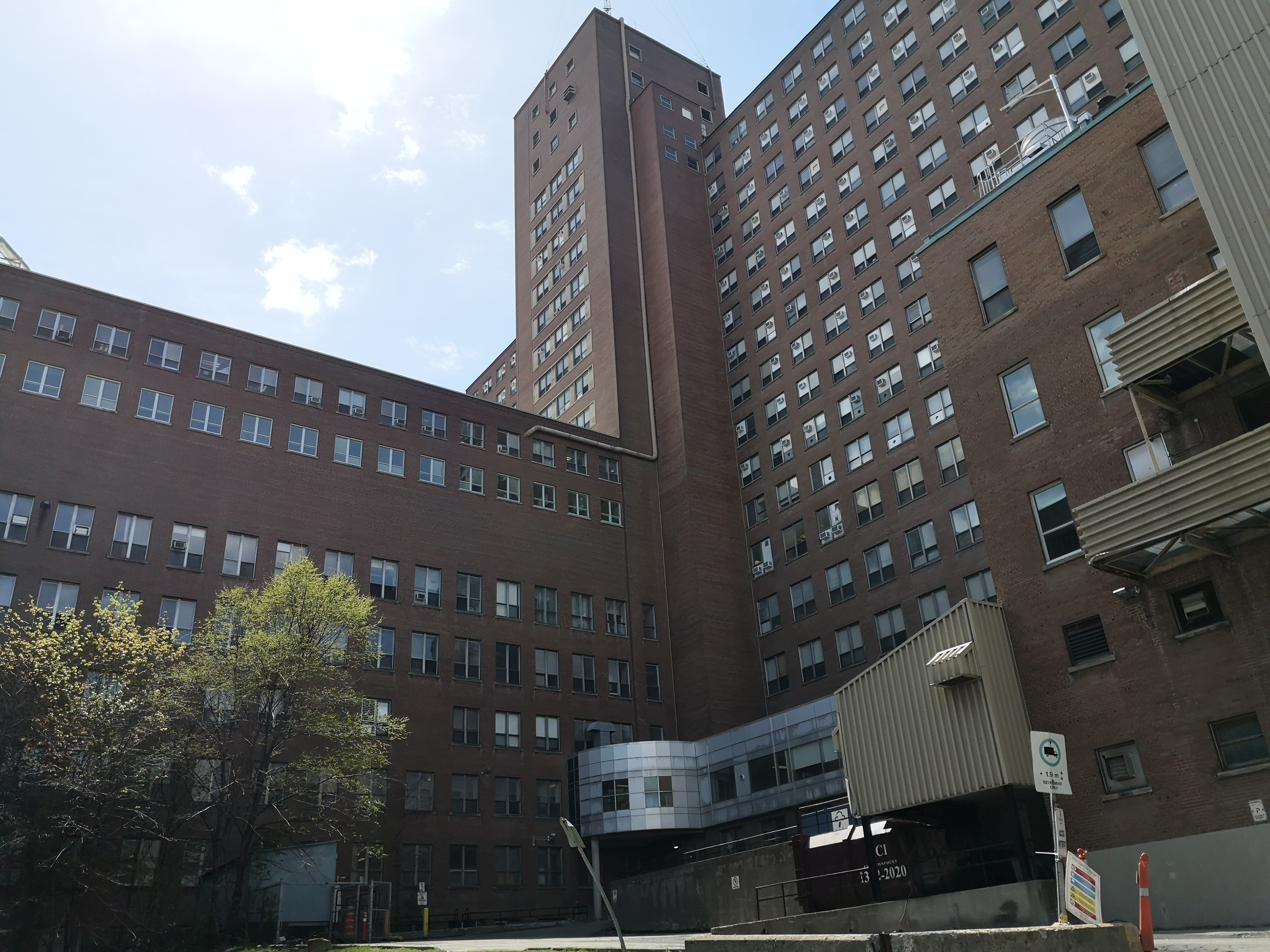

== See also ==
- Centre hospitalier universitaire de Montréal (CHUM)
  - Hôpital du Sacré-Cœur de Montréal
- 2006 Dawson College shooting
- Jewish General Hospital
- McGill University Health Centre
- McGill University Faculty of Medicine
  - Montreal Chest Institute
  - Montreal Children's Hospital
  - Montreal Neurological Institute
  - Royal Victoria Hospital
