= Centre hospitalier de l'Université de Montréal =

Hospital in Montreal, Quebec, Canada

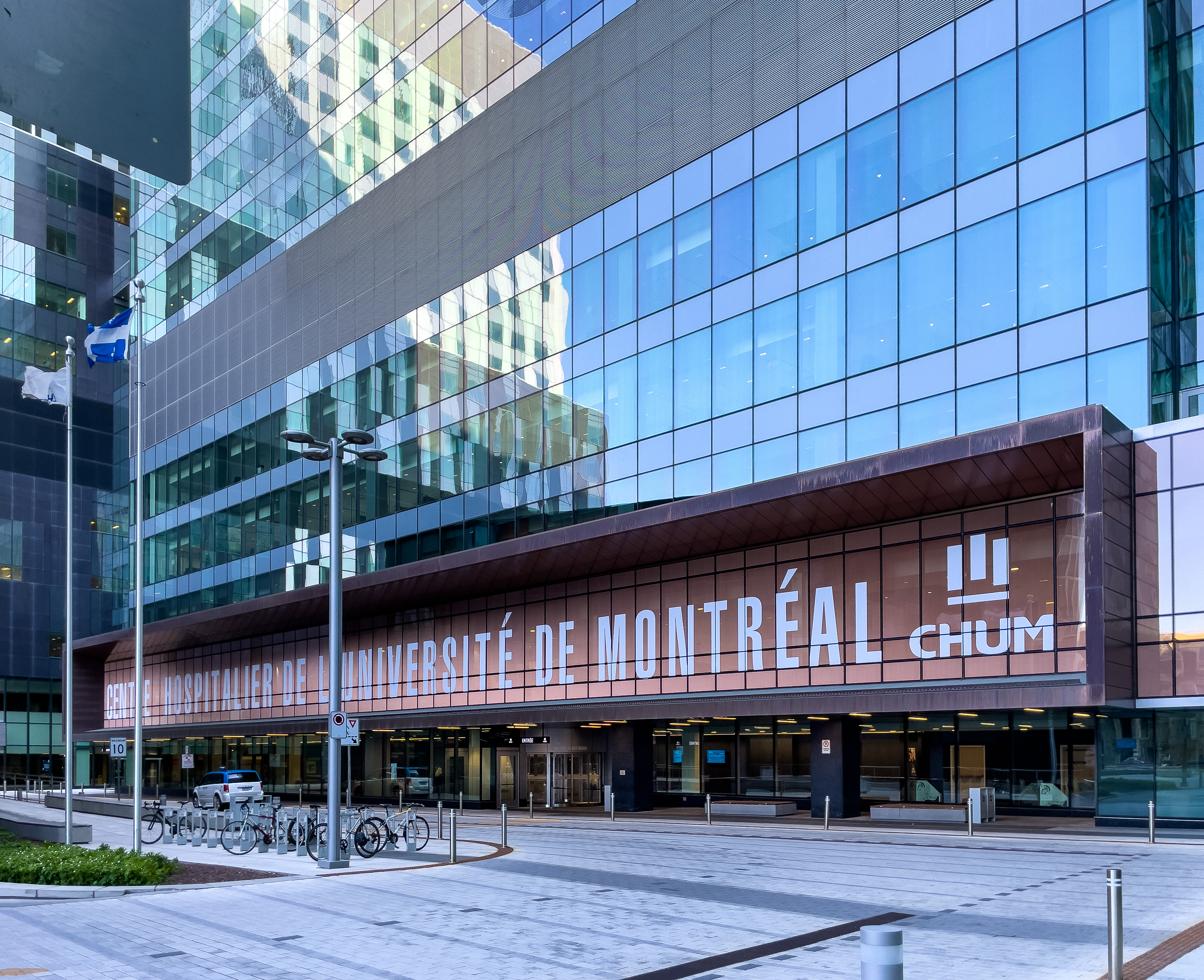
- Main entrance

Geography
- Location: Montreal, Quebec, Canada

Organization
- Care system: Public (RAMQ)
- Type: Teaching
- Affiliated university: Université de Montréal Faculty of Medicine

Services
- Emergency department: Level II trauma centre
- Beds: 1,259

History
- Founded: 1995

Links
- Website: www.chumontreal.qc.ca
- Lists: Hospitals in Canada

The Centre hospitalier de l'Université de Montréal (CHUM, French pronunciation: [ʃym], translated as University of Montreal Health Centre) is one of two major healthcare networks in the city of Montreal, Quebec. It is a teaching institution affiliated with the French-language Université de Montréal. The CHUM is one of the largest hospitals in Canada; a public not-for-profit corporation, it receives most of its funding from Quebec taxpayers through the Ministry of Health and Social Services as mandated by the Canada Health Act. The CHUM's primary mission is to provide inpatient and ambulatory care to its immediate urban clientele and specialized and ultraspecialized services to the broader metropolitan and provincial population. Its mandate also includes pure and applied research, teaching, and the evaluation of medical technology and best healthcare practices. Every year, more than 500,000 patients are admitted for care at the CHUM.

As of October 2017, the CHUM's hospital operations are being concentrated in the new megahospital complex, also called the CHUM, located adjacent to the former Saint-Luc Hospital. In addition, the CHUM has several additional satelitte sites around the megahospital and also continues to maintain operations at Hôtel-Dieu de Montréal until 2021.

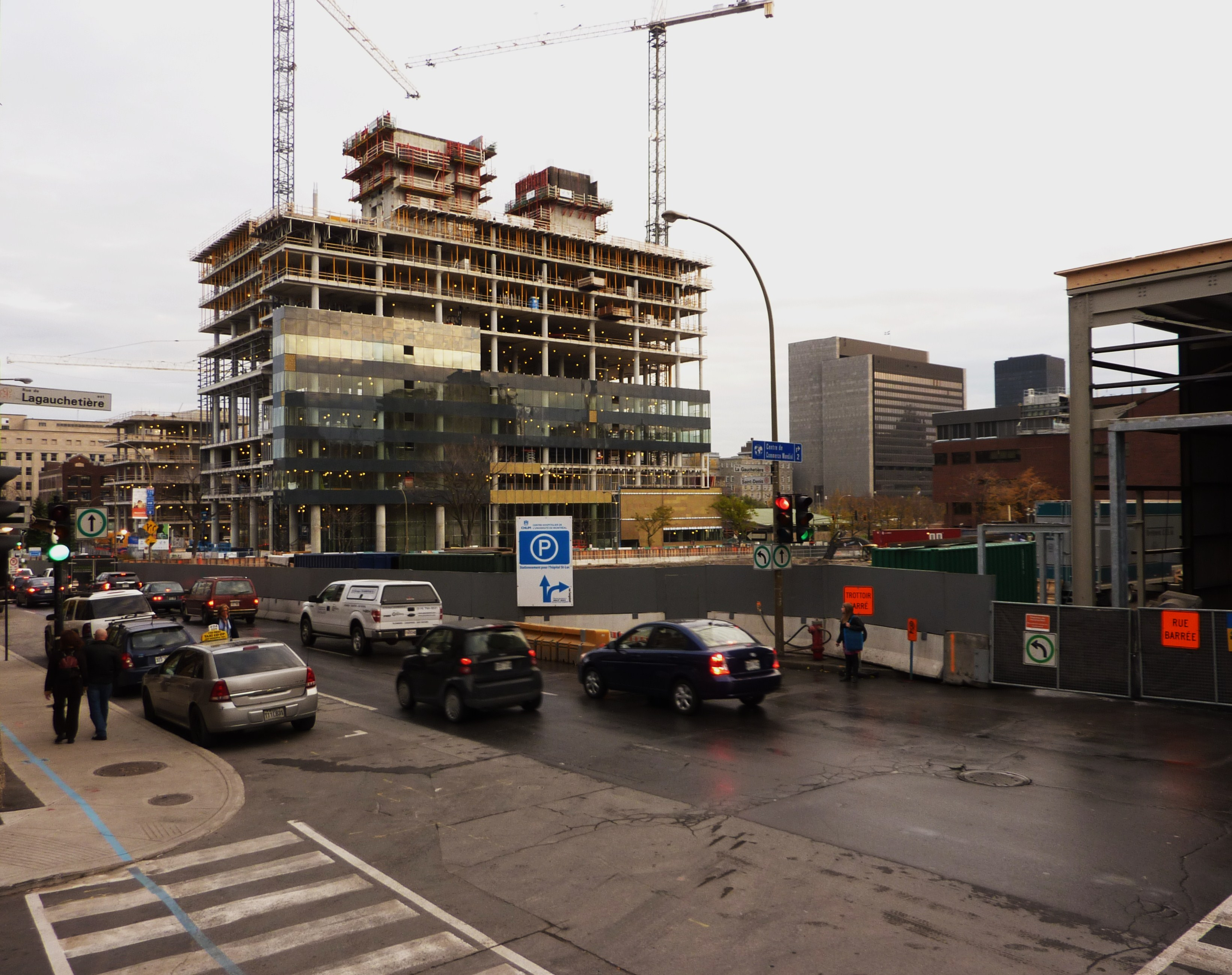
Phase 1 under construction, 2011

== History ==
The CHUM was founded in 1995 through the merger of three hospitals : Hôtel-Dieu de Montréal, Hôpital Notre-Dame, and Hôpital Saint-Luc. Prior to the concentration of services at the megahospital site, the three campuses formed interdependent components of the CHUM network; together, they hosted 1,259 beds and employ 330 managers, 881 physicians, 1,300 researchers and educators, 1,458 technicians, and 4,273 nurses. An additional 3,394 employees and 530 volunteers supported the work of the main staff.

Ever since its creation in 1995, the CHUM was intended as a single-site hospital, however, numerous delays in the project meant that it had to function for two decades as an inefficient network of three hospitals in close proximity to each other. The government of Quebec finally decided on a location for the new mega-hospital in 2005, and construction began in 2010 with an estimated price-tag of over two billion dollars. The entire project is scheduled to be completed in 2019.

The long and troubled history of the CHUM superhospital began in 1999, when then-health minister Pauline Marois announced that the megaproject would go ahead for a price tag of 700 million dollars and be built at 6000, Saint Denis Street, the site of a major bus depot. In 2003, the incoming Liberal government of Jean Charest questioned this decision and launched a commission presided by Daniel Johnson and Brian Mulroney to study other sites. In 2004, the commission recommended that the hospital be instead built on the 1000, Saint Denis site adjacent to the existing Saint-Luc hospital. That same year however, many prominent Québécois, led by Université de Montréal rector Robert Lacroix and former Premier Lucien Bouchard, publicly pushed for the hospital to be built on the site of the Outremont rail yard, leading to a media controversy and new delays. Finally, on March 24, 2005, the government announced its final decision : the megahospital would be built adjacent to the Saint-Luc hospital, as per the recommendation of the commission.

=== Development ===
Work began in 2010 with Phase 1, the new CHUM research centre and integrated training centre which was opened in 2013. Phase 2, the main hospital, was completed in 2017. Phase 3, the administrative buildings, is expected to be completed in 2019, following demolition of Hôpital Saint-Luc.

Laing O'Rourke, in a joint venture with Spain's Obrascón Huarte Lain, is delivering the project as a public-private partnership (PPP).

== Facilities and operations ==
=== Current ===
==== Megahospital site ====
The central campus of the CHUM, itself simply known as the CHUM, is located at 1051 Sanguinet Street, with underground city access to Champ-de-Mars metro station. It was opened to patients on October 8, 2017.

Two secondary buildings of the central campus are located on Saint-Denis Street and were both built during the first phase of the megahospital between 2010 and 2013. Pavillon Edouard Asselin at 264 Rene-Levesque East Boulevard, built in 1959 and formerly part of the now-defunct Hôpital Saint-Luc, is also a component of the megahospital.

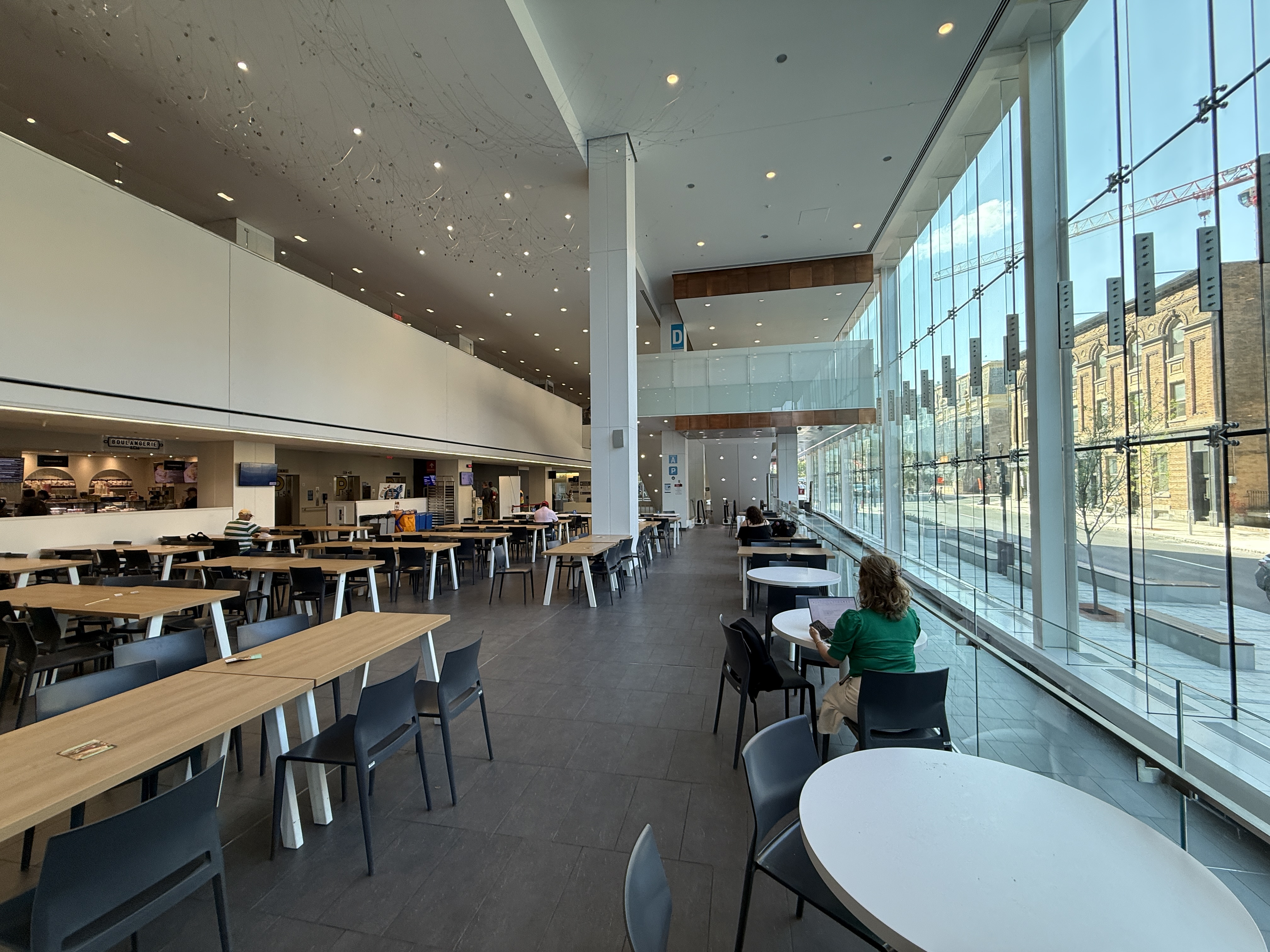
Lobby

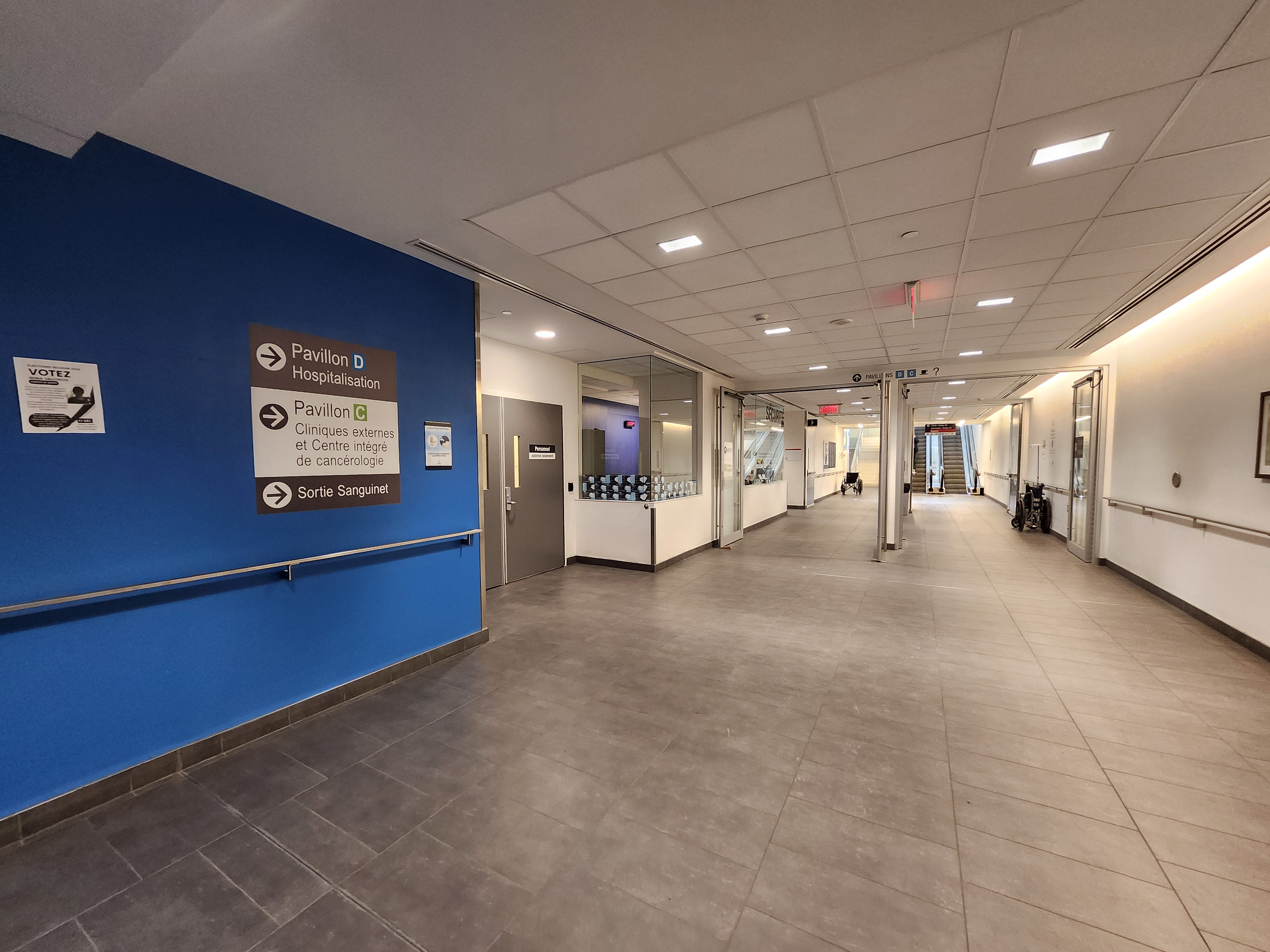
Underground City access

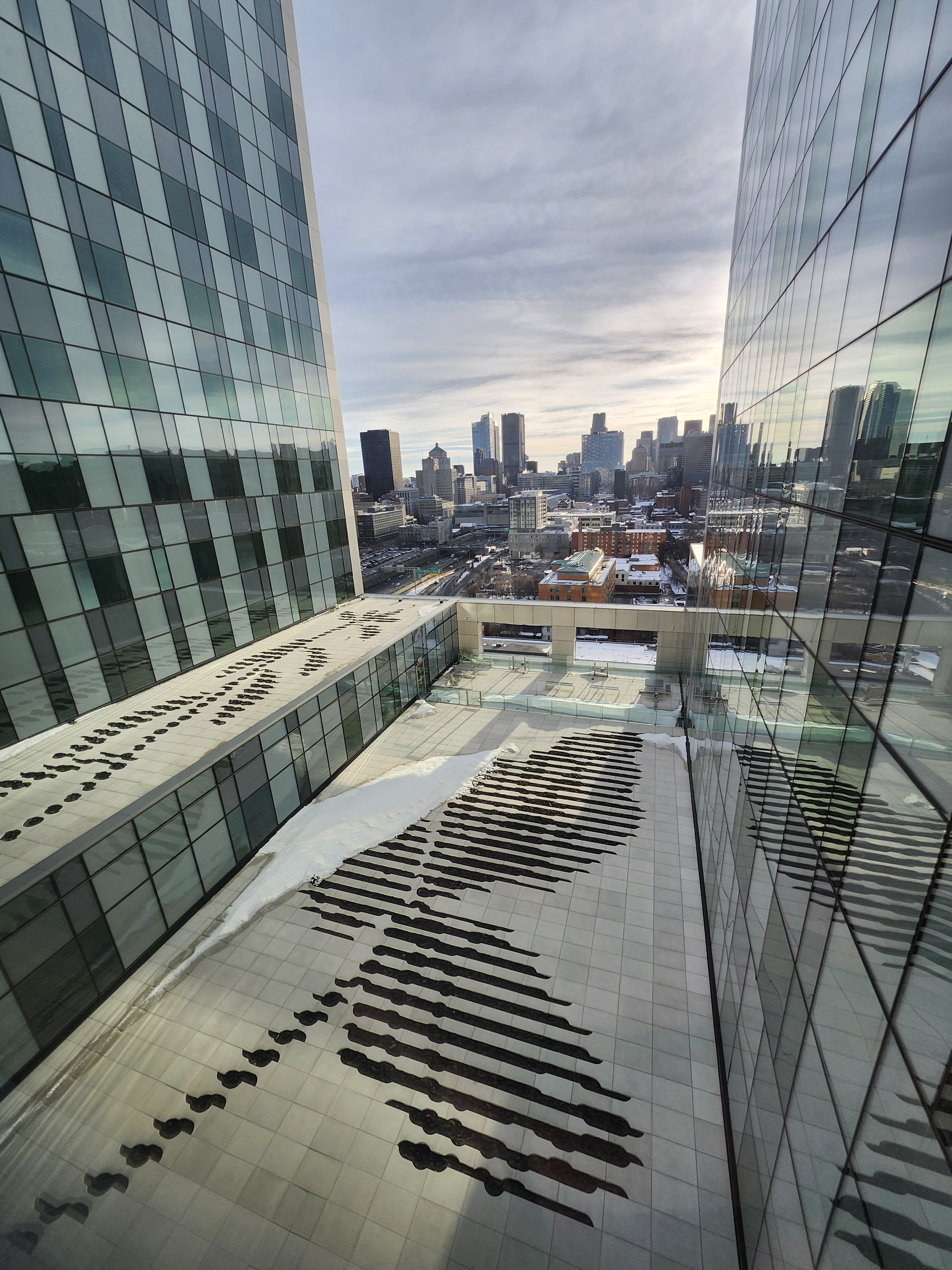
Podium artworks

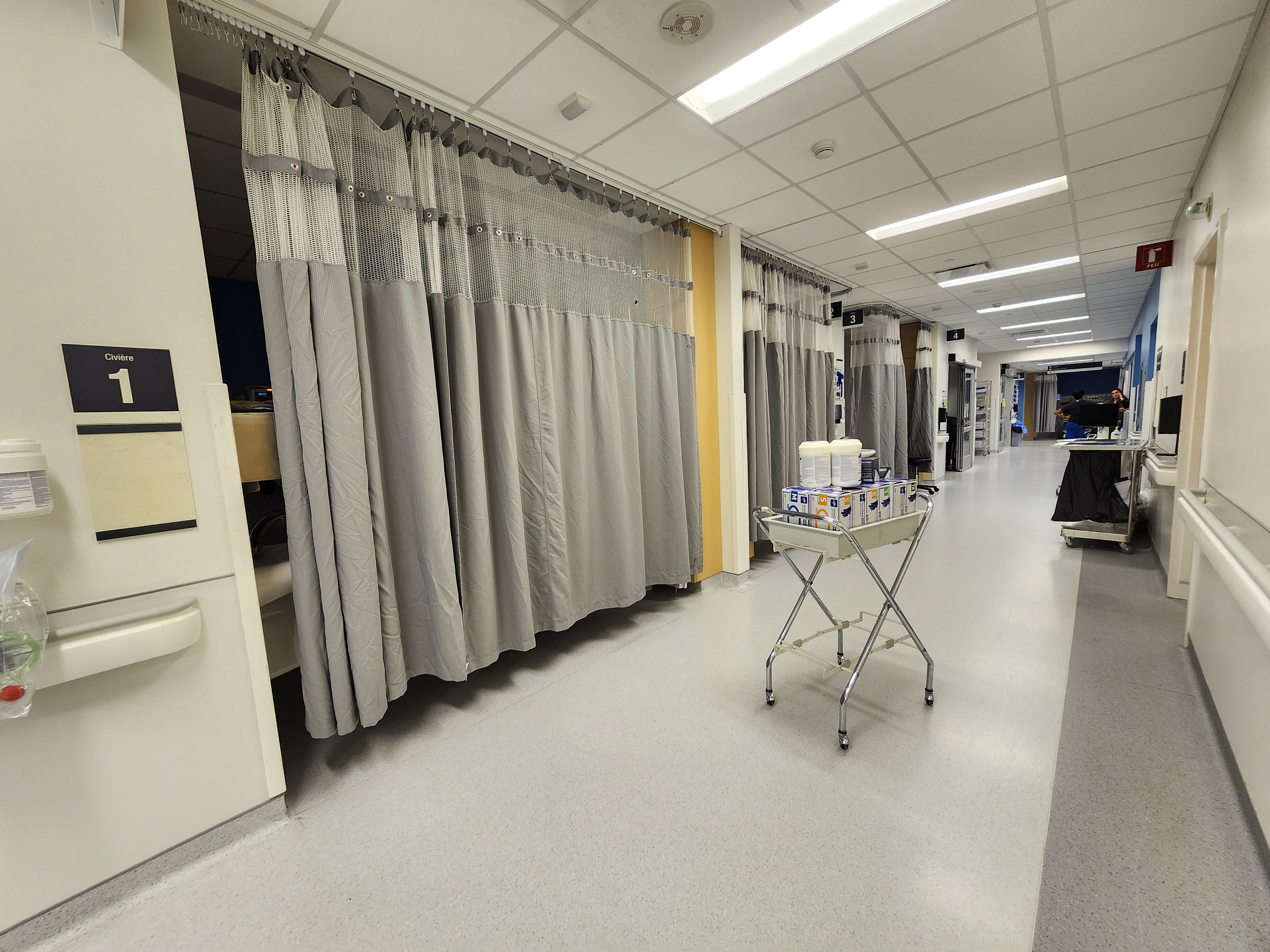
Ward

==== Hôtel-Dieu de Montréal ====
The Hôtel-Dieu is Canada's second oldest healthcare institution, founded in 1645. Located on Saint Urbain Street near downtown Montreal, it functioned as a full service teaching hospital and maintained an emergency department with level II trauma care capabilities. The hospital contained the CHUM's advanced palliative care departments, and offers specialized and ultraspecialized acute and chronic care in cardiology and pulmonology. It was home to Canada's largest and busiest burn and neuro-vascular units.

Inpatients were moved to the megahospital on 5 November 2017, but Hôtel-Dieu will remain partially in operation for non-emergency health care and administrative offices until the final phase of the central campus has been finalized in 2021. As such, Hôtel-Dieu remains affiliated with the CHUM for the time being.

=== Former ===
==== Hôpital Notre-Dame ====
The Notre-Dame hospital, located on Sherbrooke Street east of downtown, functioned as a full service teaching hospital, with an emergency department with level II trauma care capabilities. The facility was home to the CHUM's gerontology, psychiatry, neurology, ophthalmology, oncology and surgery departments, offering organ transplantation, orthopedic surgery, neurosurgery, neuro-oncology, radio-oncology, and uro-oncology services.

Its inpatients were moved to the megahospital on November 27, 2017. It ended its affiliation with the CHUM and returned into being a general hospital, integrated to the CIUSSS du Centre-Sud-de-l’Île-de-Montréal network.

==== Hôpital Saint-Luc ====
The Saint-Luc hospital, located at the intersection of Saint Denis Street and René Lévesque Boulevard in one of the poorest areas of Montreal, was a full-service teaching hospital and maintains an emergency department with advanced level I trauma care capabilities. The hospital was home to the CHUM's geriatrics, endocrinology, dermatology, hepatology, gastroenterology, gynecology, nephrology and social services departments.

With the arrival of the megahospital immediately south of its facilities, it was closed on October 8, 2017, with its remaining inpatients transferred to the CHUM on that date. The hospital was demolished in 2018 to make room for the upcoming final phase of the megahospital.

== See also ==
- McGill University Health Centre, the other major hospital network in Montreal and one of only two bilingual hospitals in the province;
- Centre hospitalier universitaire Sainte-Justine, one of the largest children's hospitals in North America, affiliated with the Université de Montréal;
- Hôpital Maisonneuve-Rosemont, the second-largest hospital in the city and the province, also affiliated with the Université de Montréal.
- Hôpital du Sacré-Cœur de Montréal
