= Lachine Hospital =

Hospital in Montreal, Quebec, Canada

Lachine Hospital Hôpital de Lachine
- McGill University Health Centre
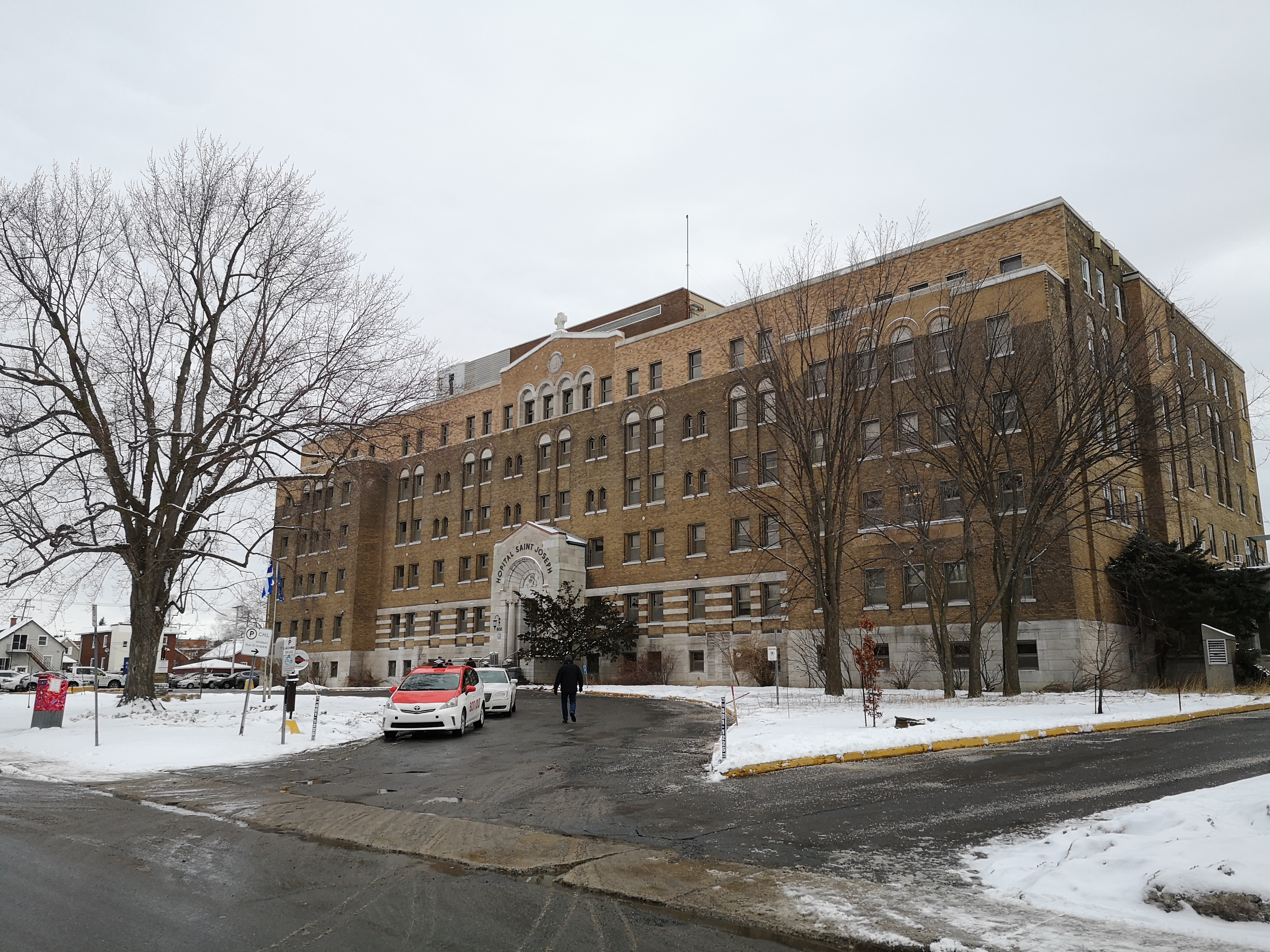

- Location in Montreal

Geography
- Location: 650, 16e Avenue; Montreal, Quebec; H8S 3N5
- Coordinates: 45.441036°N 73.676988°W

Organisation
- Care system: RAMQ (Quebec medicare)
- Type: Teaching
- Affiliated university: McGill University Faculty of Medicine
- Network: McGill University Health Centre

Services
- Emergency department: Yes
- Speciality: Geriatrics, bariatric surgery, and ophthalmology

History
- Founded: 1913

Links
- Website: https://muhc.ca/lachine

Lachine Hospital (French: Hôpital de Lachine) is a public hospital in Montreal, Quebec, Canada. It is located at 650 16th Avenue in the borough of Lachine (at the corner of Saint Antoine Street). It is one of the sites of the McGill University Health Centre.

A community general hospital, it offers a range of services including ophthalmology, cardiology, general surgery, laboratory services and medical imaging (MRI, CT scan, Radiography, and Ultrasound).

The Lachine Hospital is currently involved in a major modernization project called HOP Lachine! A Patient-Focused Hospital. The $220 million project is being carried out in partnership with the Ministry of Health and Social Services (MSSS) and the Société québécoise des infrastructures (SQI) and is scheduled to be completed between 2026 and 2027.

== History ==
Established in 1913 as the Hôpital St-Joseph, it was administered by the Sisters of Providence. In 1973, its name was changed to Centre hospitalier de Lachine and its management was transferred to the Government of Quebec.

The Lachine Hospital and its long-term nursing home (Camille-Lefebvre Pavillon) were integrated into the McGill University Health Centre in 2008.

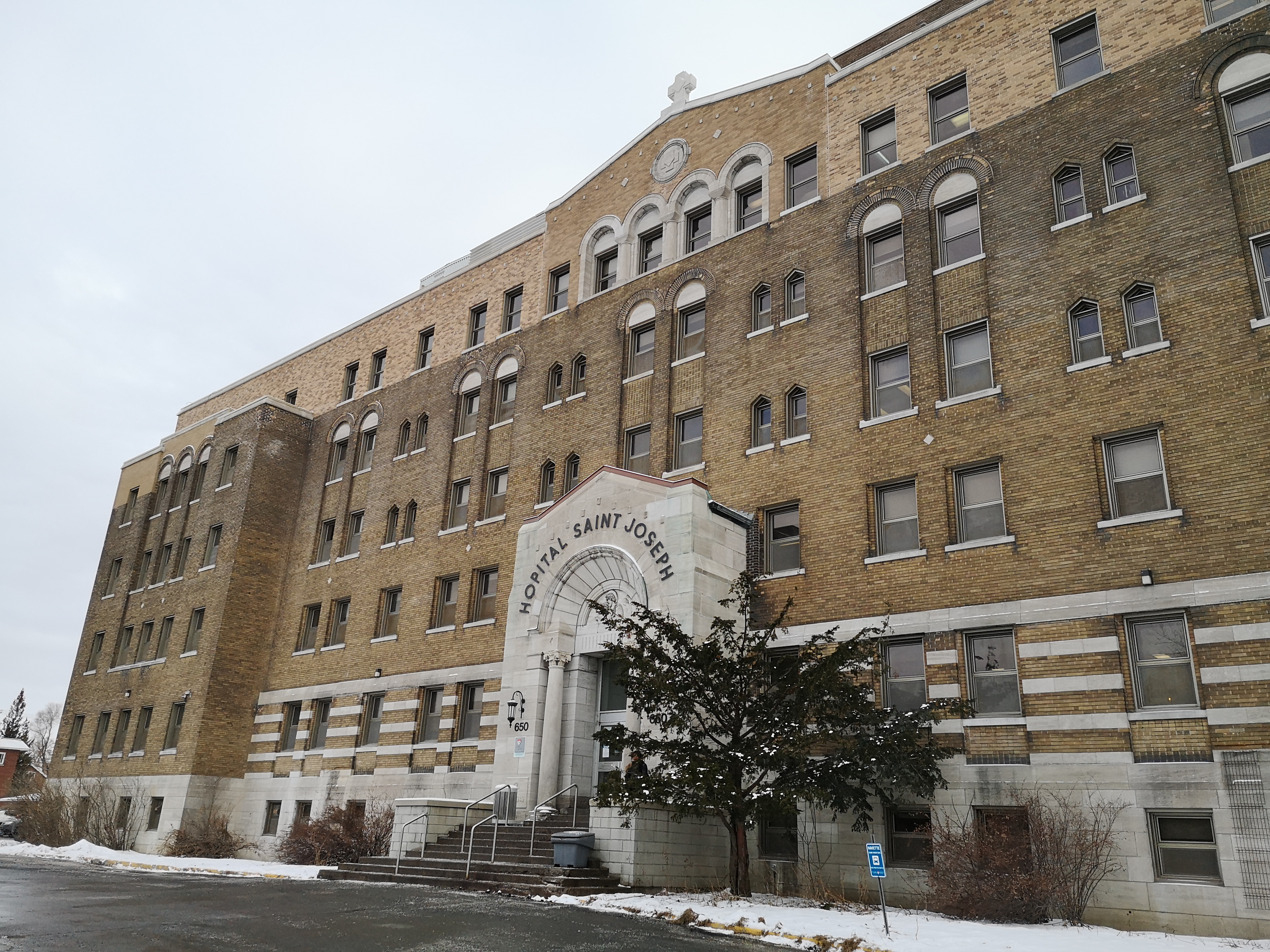
Main Building

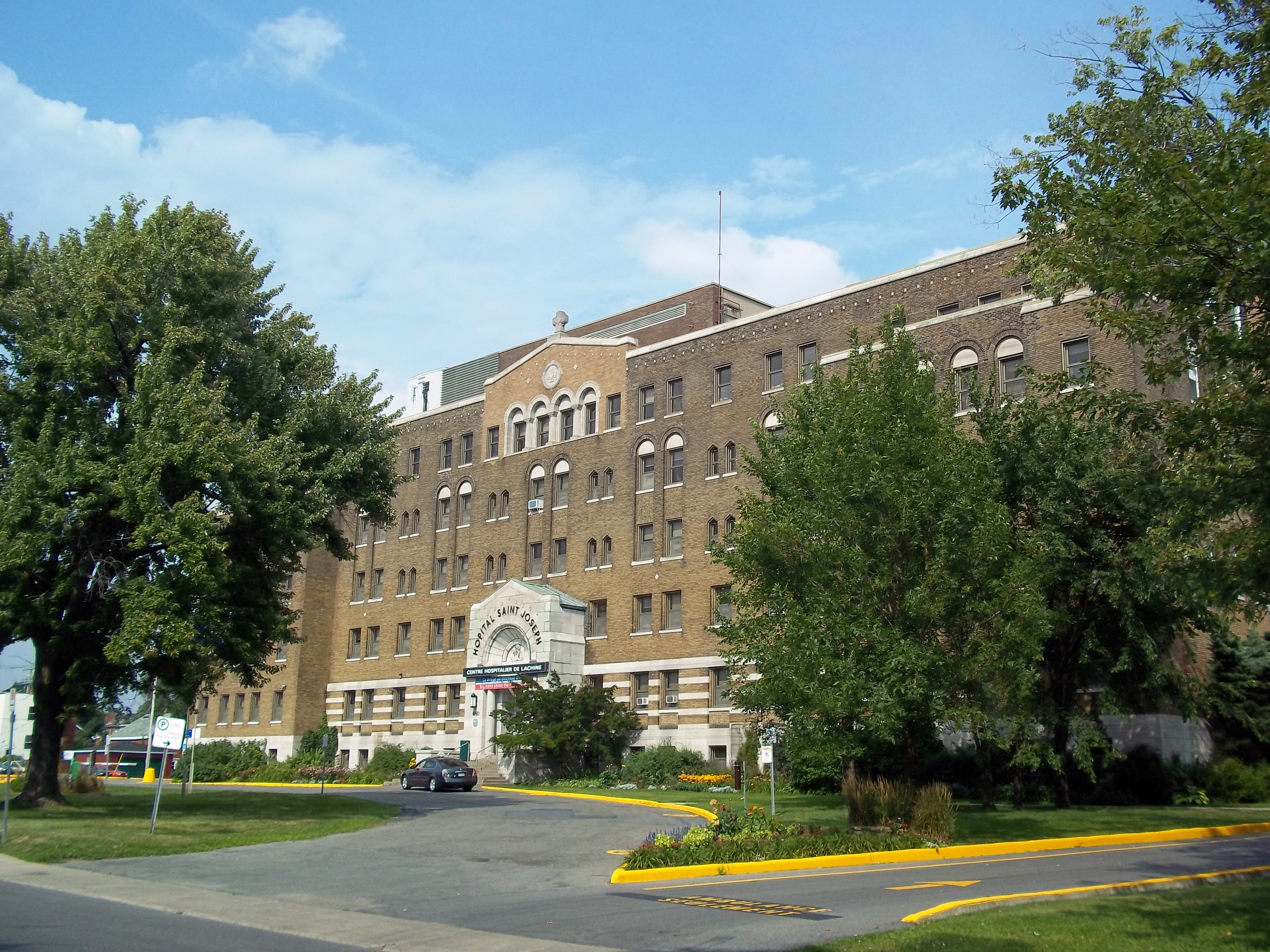
Mail Building (Summer)

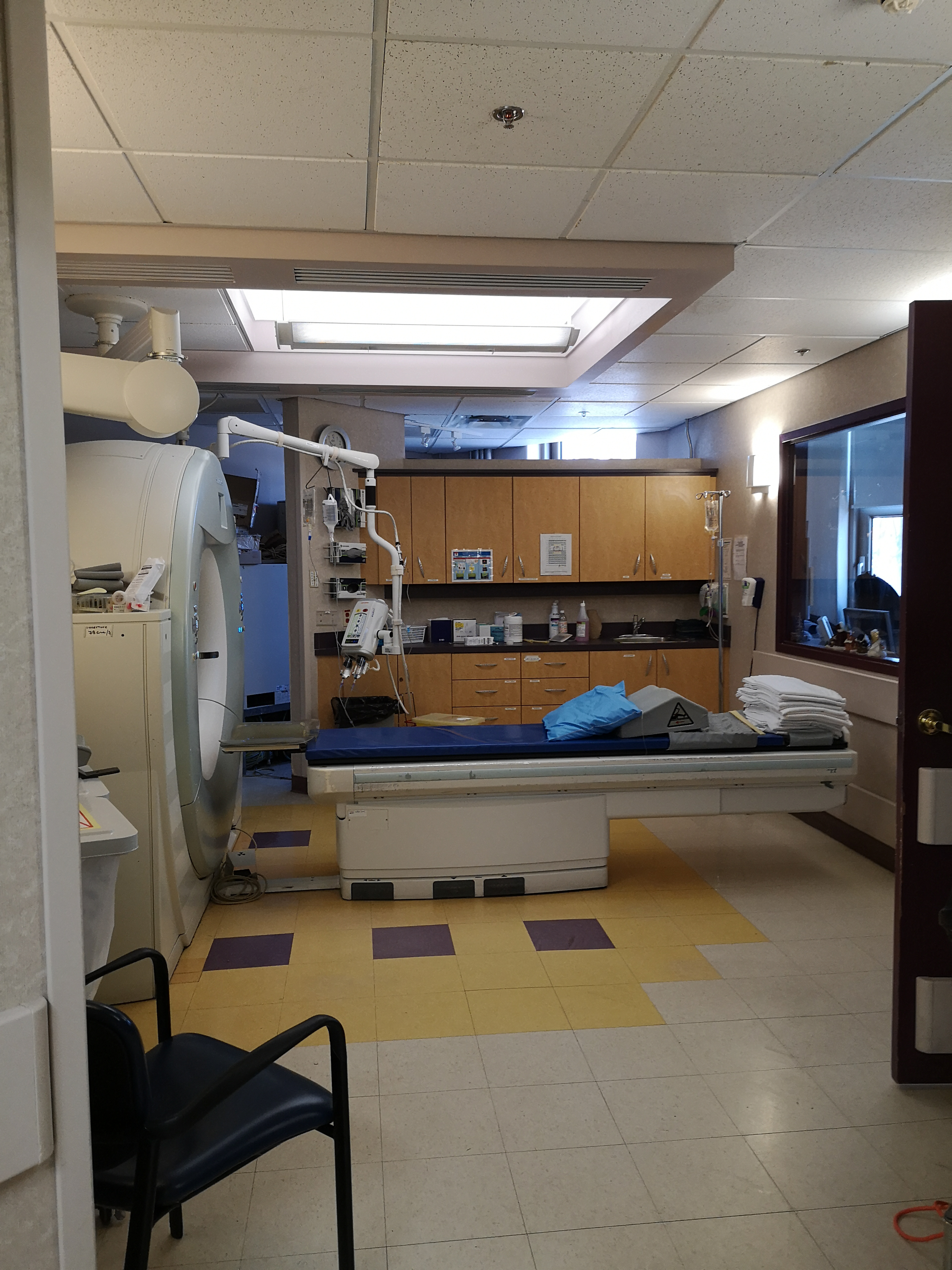
CT Scanner

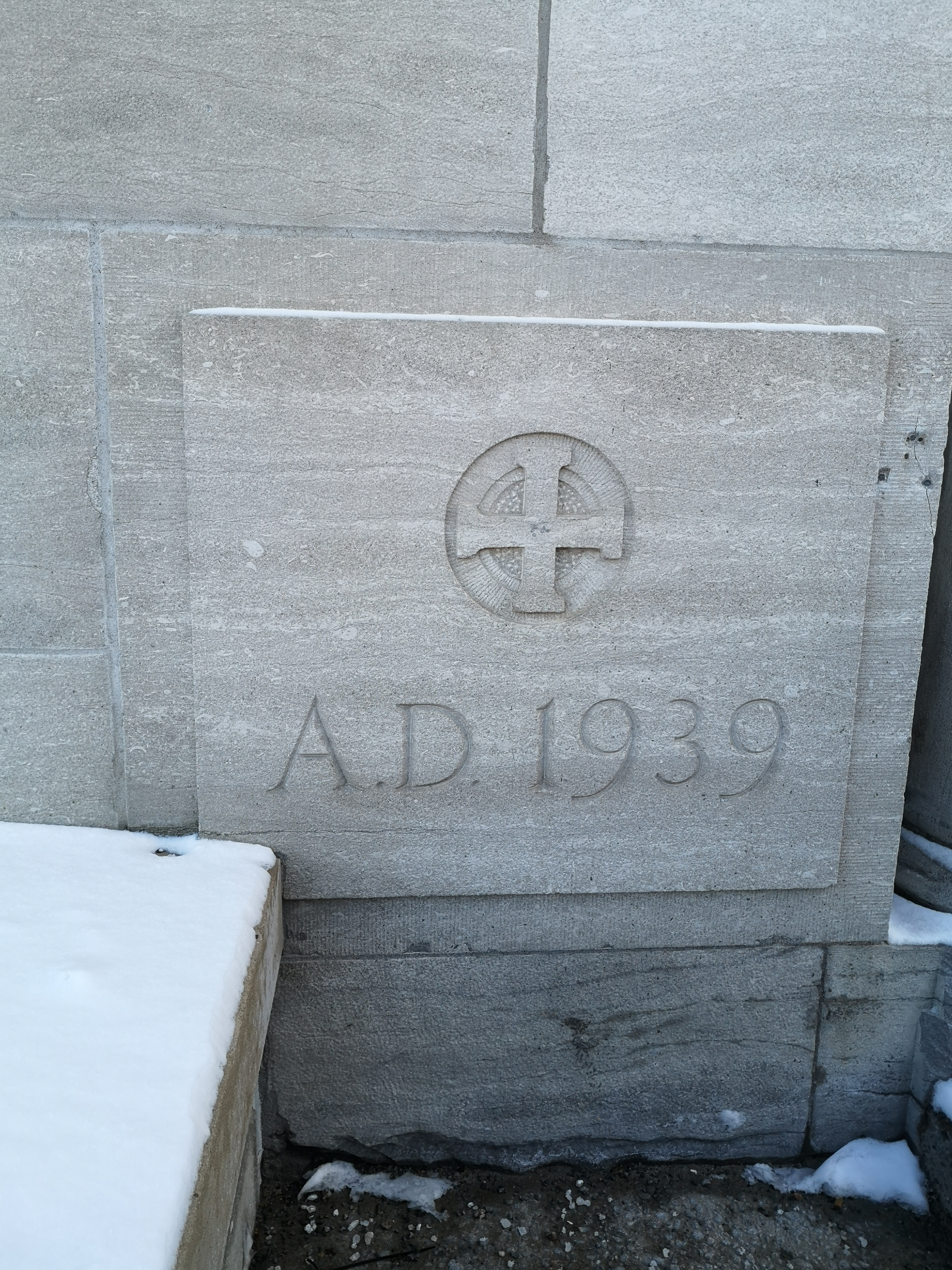
Main Building Cornerstone
