= McGill University Health Centre =

McGill University Health Centre Centre universitaire de santé McGill
- Ministry of Health and Social Services

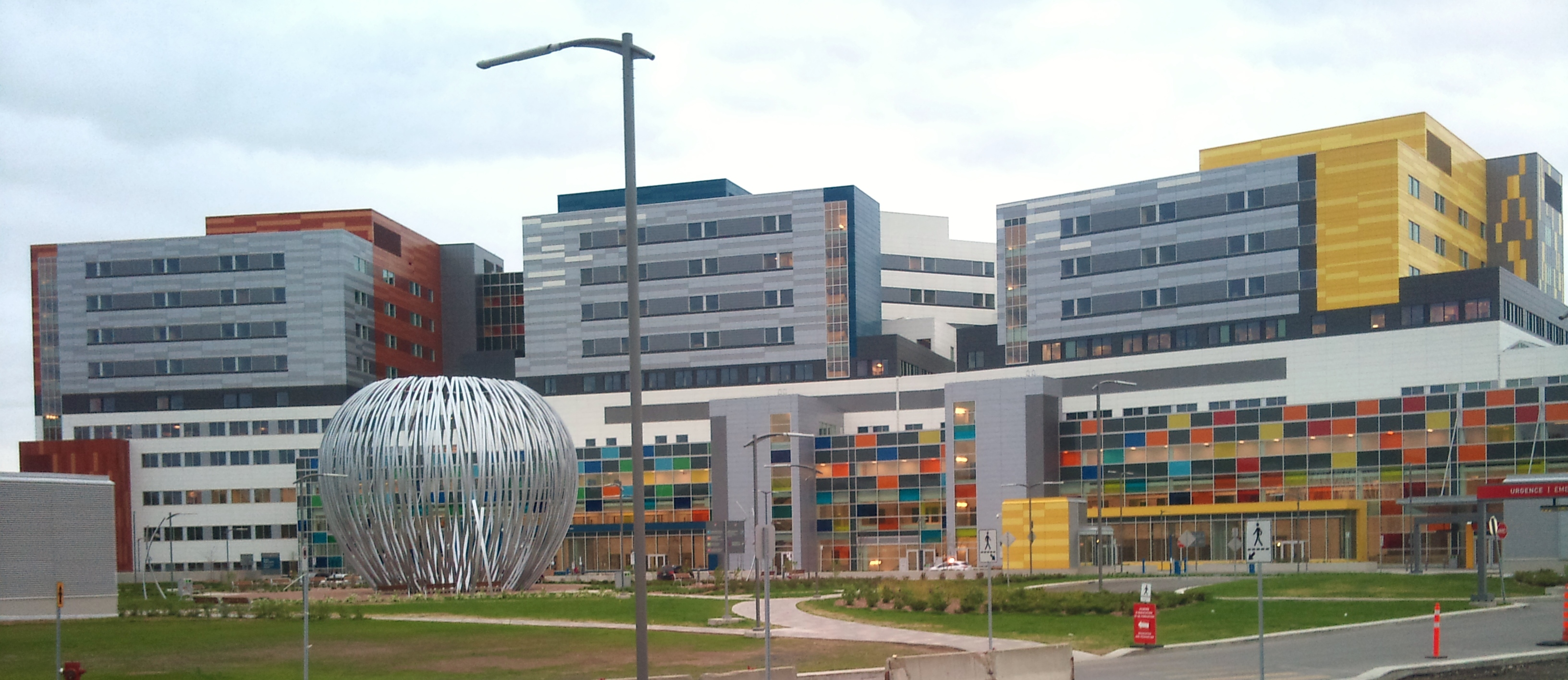
- McGill University Health Centre's hospital complex - Glen Site

Geography
- Location: Montreal, Quebec, Canada
- Coordinates: 45.472891°N 73.600974°W

Organization
- Care system: Public (RAMQ)
- Type: Teaching
- Affiliated university: McGill University Faculty of Medicine

Services
- Emergency department: 4 (MGH, RVH, MCH, LH)
- Beds: 1,379

History
- Founded: 1997; 29 years ago

Links
- Website: muhc.ca
- Lists: Hospitals in Canada

The McGill University Health Centre (MUHC; French: Centre universitaire de santé McGill; CUSM) is one of two major healthcare networks in the city of Montreal, Quebec. It is affiliated with McGill University and is one of the largest and most modern health centres in North America. The majority of its funding comes from Quebec taxpayers through the Ministry of Health and Social Services. The MUHC provides specialized inpatient and ambulatory (outpatient) care.

== History ==
The MUHC is the result of a voluntary merger in 1997 of the Montreal General Hospital (1821), the Royal Victoria Hospital (1893), the Montreal Chest Institute (1909), the Montreal Children's Hospital (1904), and the Montreal Neurological Institute-Hospital (1934). In 2008, the Lachine Hospital (1913) and the CHSLD Camille-Lefebvre (1992) became a part of the MUHC. The Institute (Research Institute of the MUHC,1997) brings together 8 research programs in adult and child health.

The MUHC announced in 2007 that it would consolidate some of its services in a single facility: the Glen site. The project cost more than originally budgeted and took longer than expected to complete. It was budgeted at around $700 million but cost around $1.3 billion; it was meant to take only three years but took much longer. The project was completed in 2015.

The new Glen site building replaced the existing facilities of the Royal Victoria Hospital (on April 26, 2015), the Montreal Children's Hospital (on May 24, 2015), and the Montreal Chest Institute (on June 14, 2015). It also became the site of the Cedars Cancer Centre and The Institute (RI-MUHC) which contains Biosafety level 3 laboratory. The Montreal General Hospital, The Neuro (Montreal Neurological Institute-Hospital), and Lachine Hospital remain on their respective sites. The Lachine Hospital site is currently undergoing major renovations. The modernization project is called "HOP Lachine! A Patient-Focused Hospital". The project is scheduled to be completed between 2026 and 2027.

== Activity and Capacity ==
MUHC is a bilingual academic health centre. In addition to providing services in French, the MUHC is designated to offer services to patients in English. As of 2024, the MUHC employs more than 14,500 people:

- 1,420 physicians
- 3,989 nurses and cardiorespiratory care employees
- 137 pharmacists
- 69 dentists
- 802 clinical biochemists, medical physicists and residents
- 2,573 para-technical, auxiliary services and trades employees
- 2,484 office workers, technicians and administrative professionals
- 2,048 health and social services technicians and professionals, other than physicians and nurses
- 383 managers
- 746 volunteers at the hospitals, plus board members of the facilities and foundations, as well as their fundraising offices

The Institute (RI-MUHC) employs more than 3,500 people, including:

- 723 researchers in basic, clinical and evaluative science, including 529 with funding
- 1,386 students, including 410 master's, 602 doctoral and 174 postdoctoral students, and approximately 200 clinical research trainees
- 1,420 research and administrative staff

Every year, more than 5,000 people are trained at the MUHC. This includes more than:

- 1,000 medical residents and surgical residents
- 2,500 nursing students
- 980 medical students
- 475 students in multidisciplinary services
- 150 pharmacy students
- 30 students in medical imaging and perioperative services
- 30 students in Optilab

The institution's mandate is to provide tertiary and quaternary care to the population of Montreal and Quebec. The extended network of regions and health service centres that the MUHC covers is known officially as the Réseau universitaire intégré de santé et de services sociaux McGill, or RUISSS McGill. The territory of the RUISSS McGill represents approximately 63% of Quebec's land area and measures almost 800,000 square kilometres.

The RUISSS McGill regions are:

- Montreal
- Outaouais
- Abitibi-Témiscamingue
- Nord-du-Québec
- Montérégie
- Nunavik
- James Bay-Cree Territories

The MUHC is the largest combined adult and children's hospital in the province, providing all aspects of specialized and complex care to both populations among its sites, with pediatric, adult, and cancer services being combined at the Glen site.

As a principal teaching site of the McGill University Faculty of Medicine, a key activity is medical education. In addition, The Institute (RI-MUHC) is an international research centre with a worldwide reputation in the field of biomedical sciences and health care.

The Institute has:

- ongoing research collaborations with 85 countries worldwide
- around 2,550 peer-reviewed scientific publications per year
- 1,600 ongoing projects (including clinical trials and others)
- over 180,000 research participants per year
- 744 fundamental, clinical and evaluative researchers
- 1490 research trainees
- 1476 staff in research and administration

== OPTILAB Montréal-CUSM ==
In 2020, the MUHC's multi-site laboratory OPTILAB Montréal-CUSM became the first of the 12 OPTILAB clusters in Quebec to receive ISO certification from the Bureau de normalisation du Québec and the Standards Council of Canada (SCC).

OPTILAB Montréal-CUSM's territory spans from Montreal to Abitibi. Its laboratories provide support to several healthcare establishments, ranging from large academic health centres to smaller rural ones.

More information on OPTILAB Montréal-CUSM.

== Hospitals and sites that make up the MUHC ==
- Glen site (1001 Boul. Decarie)
  - Royal Victoria Hospital
  - Montreal Children's Hospital
  - Montreal Chest Institute
  - Cedars Cancer Centre
  - MUHC Adult Ophthalmology Clinic (5252 Boul. de Maisonneuve West)
- Montreal General Hospital
  - Allan Memorial Institute (provides ambulatury (outpatient) psychiatry services at 1025 Pine Avenue)
- The Neuro (Montreal Neurological Institute-Hospital) (3801 University Street)
- Lachine Hospital and Camille Lefebvre Pavilion (650 16th Avenue, Lachine)
- MUHC Reproductive Centre (888 Boul. de Maisonneuve East)

== Affiliated hospitals ==
The following hospitals are affiliated with the McGill Faculty of Medicine but are not integral parts of the MUHC:

- Lakeshore General Hospital
- Jewish General Hospital
- St. Mary's Hospital
- Douglas Mental Health University Institute
- Shriners Hospital for Children

== Historical Controversies ==
The 2004–11 tenure of Arthur Porter, a politically active Montreal physician, as the hospital's CEO received $22.5 million in consulting fees from SNC-Lavalin and then awarded the firm with a $1.3 billion contract related to the construction of the hospital. These dealings were found to be in violation of the Quebec Health Act. Porter resigned on December 5, 2011. Porter left Canada and was apprehended by Interpol agents with his wife in Panama, where he was imprisoned and died from cancer in 2015 while awaiting his extradition to Quebec.

== See also ==
- Centre hospitalier de l'Université de Montréal, the other major hospital network in Montreal, affiliated with the Université de Montréal
