= Montreal Chest Institute =

Coordinates: 45.472891°N 73.600974°W

- McGill University Health Centre
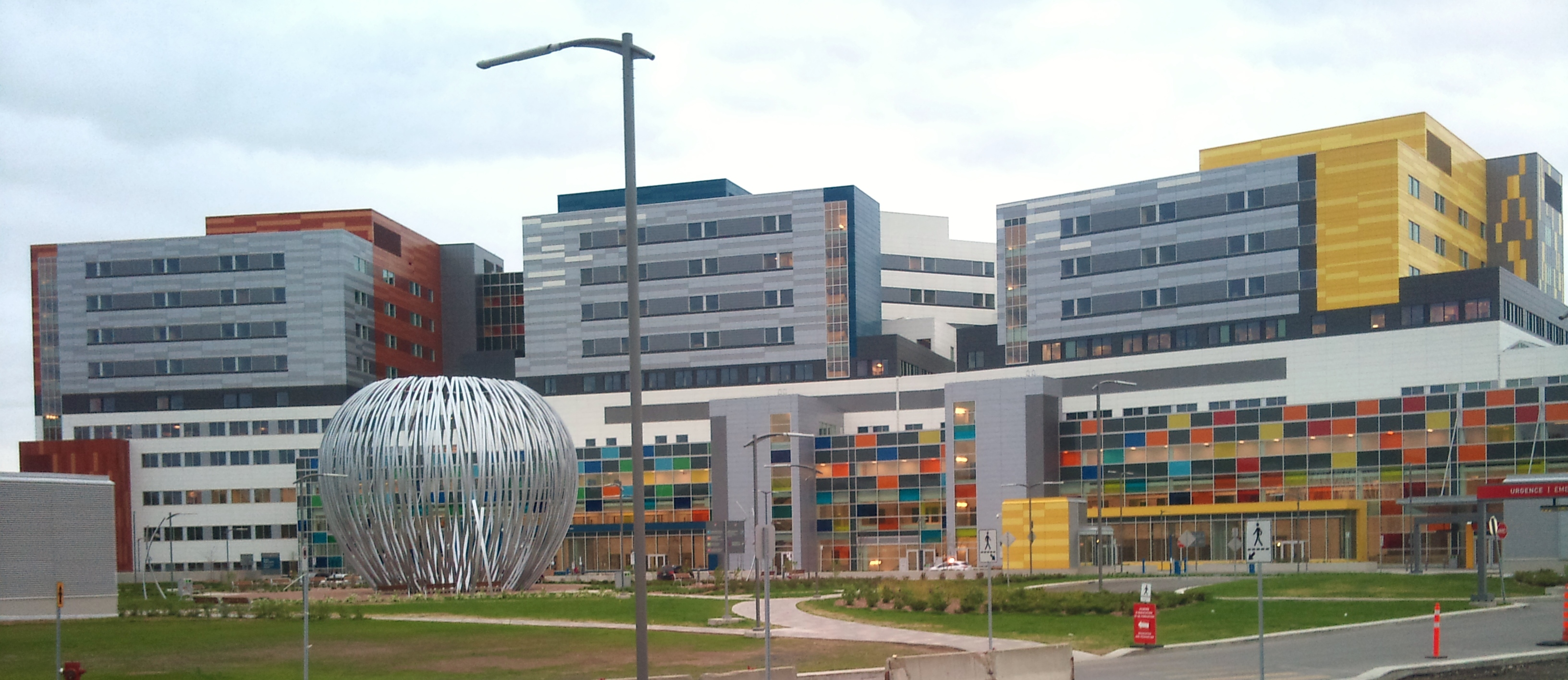
- Glen site of the MUHC

Geography
- Location: Montreal, Quebec, Canada

Organization
- Care system: RAMQ (Quebec medicare)
- Type: Teaching, Specialist
- Affiliated university: McGill University Faculty of Medicine
- Network: McGill University Health Centre

Links
- Website: http://www.royalvic.com/ Royal Victoria Hospital and Montreal Chest Institute
- Lists: Hospitals in Canada

Montreal Chest Institute (MCI) is part of the McGill University Health Centre (MUHC) and has been located at the MUHC's Glen Site since June 14, 2015.

The MCI specializes in respiratory medicine and is considered a centre of clinical, research, and teaching expertise in that field.

The MCI cares for patients with acute and chronic respiratory diseases.

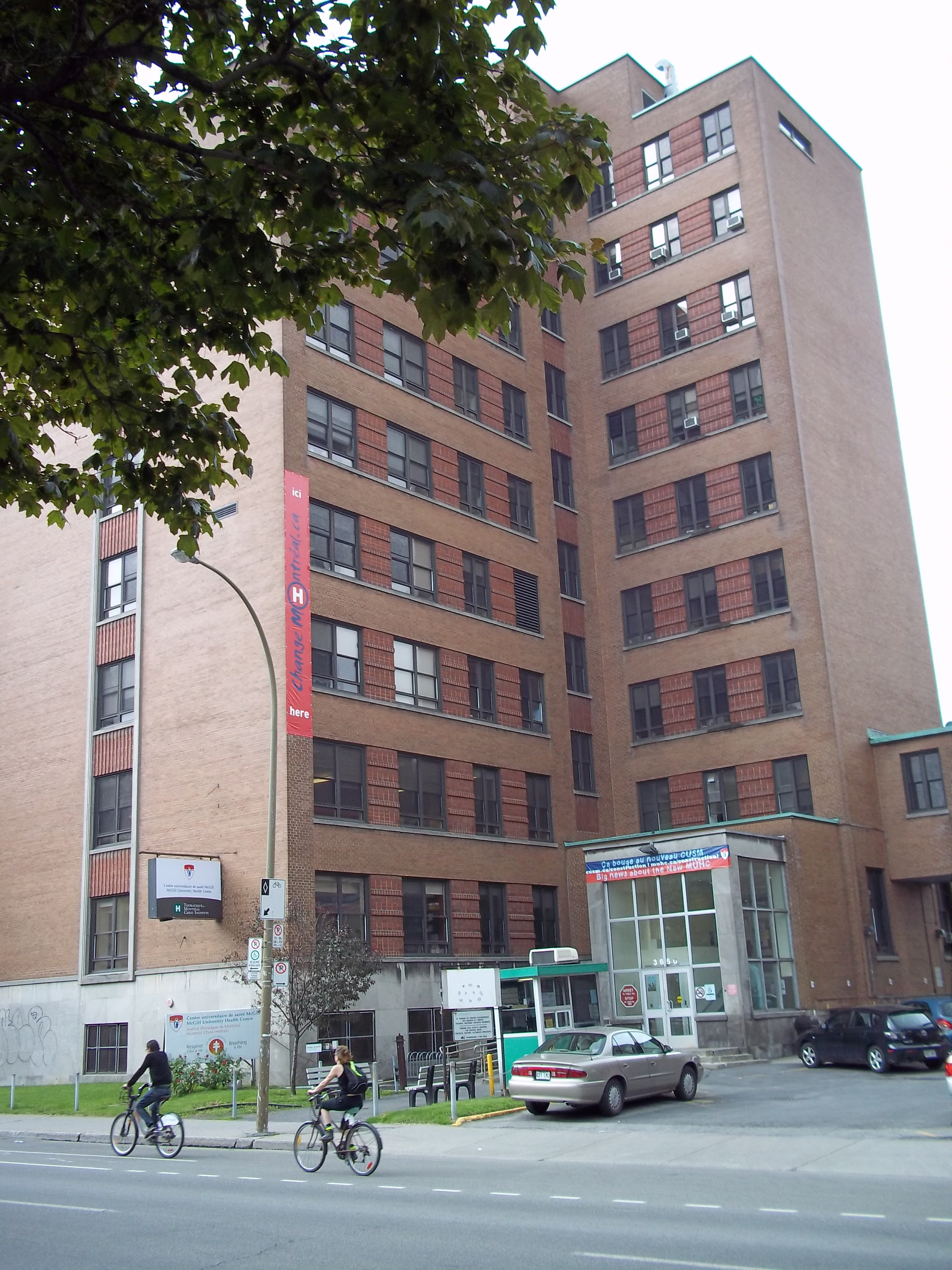
Previous site of the Montreal Chest Institute

== See also ==
- Montreal Heart Institute
