= Shriners Hospital for Children – Canada =

- Shriners Hospitals for Children
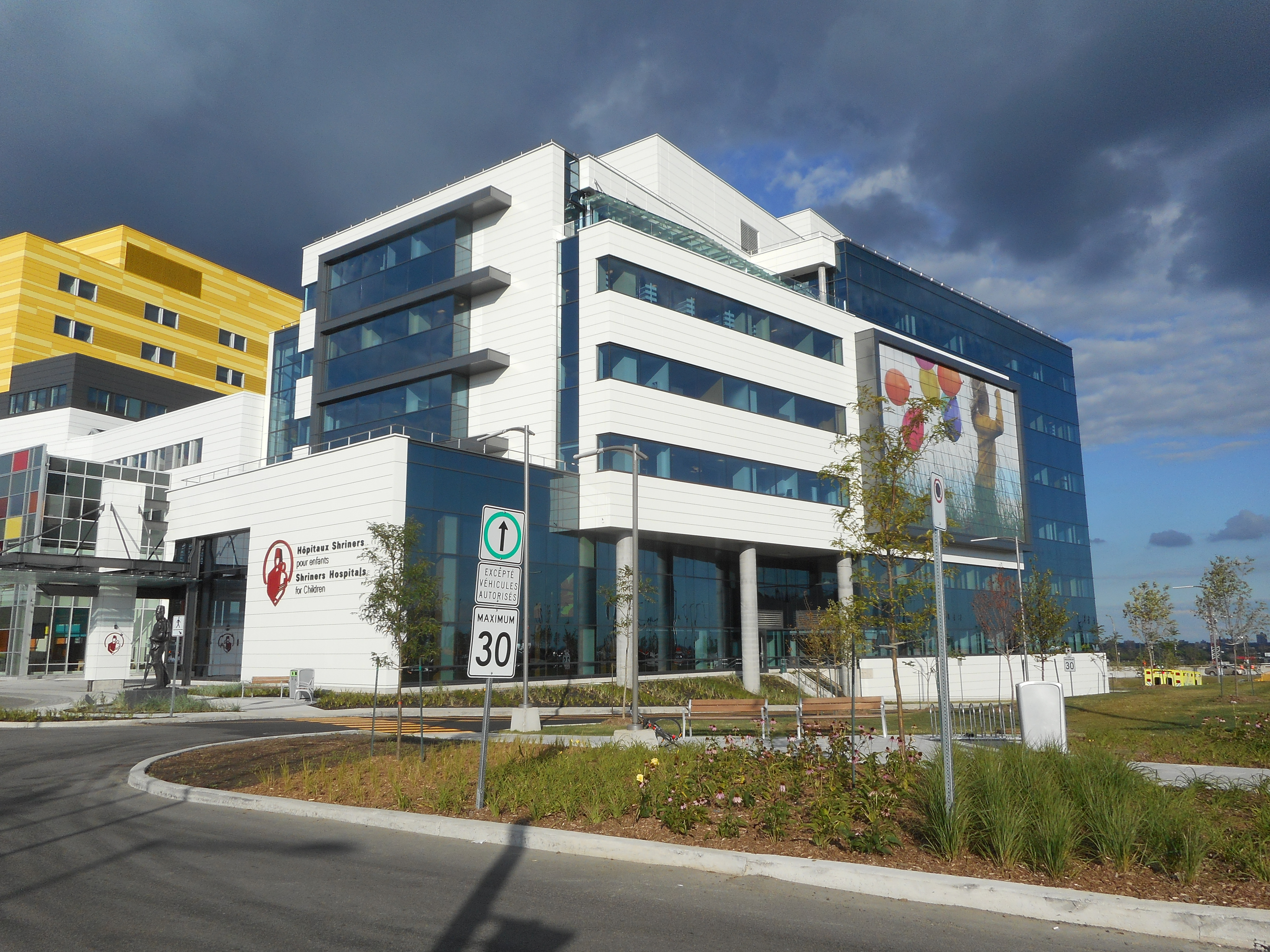

- Location in Montreal

Geography
- Location: Notre-Dame-de-Grâce, Montreal, Quebec, Canada
- Coordinates: 45.4719°N 73.6019°W

Organization
- Care system: Charity care
- Type: Specialist
- Affiliated university: McGill University Faculty of Medicine

Services
- Beds: 40
- Speciality: Pediatric hospital

History
- Founded: February 18, 1925; 101 years ago

Links
- Website: Official Website
- Lists: Hospitals in Canada

The Shriners Hospital for Children – Canada (French: Hôpital Shriners pour enfants – Canada; also known as Shriners Children's Canada and informally as the Montreal Shriner's Hospital) is the Canadian branch of the Shriners Hospitals for Children network. It is located in Notre-Dame-de-Grâce, Montreal, Quebec, at 1003 Decarie Boulevard. It overlooks downtown Montreal, and is close to Royal Victoria Hospital of the McGill University Health Centre (MUHC) hospital network, with which it is associated but not fully affiliated.

The hospital was previously located at 1529 Cedar Avenue, which had outgrown its facilities, and since it was surrounded by Mount Royal Park, it could not expand in that location before being moved to the new location in 2015.

The Shriner's Hospital for Children, along with McGill University was named number 1 in the world in expertise in Osteogenesis Imperfecta (OI) with researchers Frank Rauch ranked #1 and Francis H. Glorieux #3 in global expertise in OI.

== History ==
The hospital opened at its original location on February 10, 1925 when it received its first patient: 10 year old Harvey Jones from Haileybury Ontario.

=== Political uncertainty prior to relocation ===
Following years of wrangling within the Shriners and in Quebec, a general vote of the Shriners was planned that would decide the future of the Canadian hospital. Originally slated to move to the new MUHC superhospital site, the project had been delayed more than a decade. However the delay proved to be decisive with new Shriners president, who wanted the hospital moved out of Montreal. With the push for an alternate site, Ottawa and London, Ontario both pushed for the new facility. The Ottawa Children's Hospital of Eastern Ontario hospital supported Montreal first, but if it were to move, it wanted it in Ottawa. It was felt an Ottawa location would not greatly affect access to those in the US Northeast, or eastern Canada, only being about 200 km from Montreal. The president of the Shriners brought up the potential threat of Quebec separation to influence the move out of the province. The search committee found that it was preferable to move to London, Ontario. However, the Shriners of Ottawa, Quebec, eastern Canada, and northeast USA opposed this decision. A vote to decide was held by the Shriners members at the meeting in Baltimore on July 5, 2005. Of a total of 1214 votes, 608 voted in favour of staying in Montreal, 605 of moving to London and one vote was refused. Despite a near tie, London Shriners withdrew their resolution on April 12, 2006.

Two years following, unsatisfied with the prior decision, the London Shriners decided to invoke a last minute resolution to move the hospital once again, based on the fact the Quebec government still continued to delay the project or fully decontaminate the land where the hospital was to be built. The issue was decided with another vote that was held on July 3, 2007. Once again the vote swung in favour of staying in Montreal, with 75% of members voting against the move. Despite the decision, construction was still delayed and only 90% of the land had been decontaminated. By 2010, construction of the new super hospital had still been delayed, and with it yet again delayed the new Shriners hospital as well. With a failure for the project to move forward in a timely fashion, the London Shriners had vowed to re-attempt to move the hospital to Ontario.

=== Relocating ===
On October 13, 2011, the official ground breaking ceremony for the new Shriners hospital took place, on the site of the MUHC superhospital. Two years later, with construction well under way, a corner stone ceremony was held on September 22, 2013. The new Shriners building was completed in 2015. The new hospital, located at 1003 Decarie, belatedly opened in October 2015.
