= Université de Montréal Faculty of Medicine =

Medical school in Quebec, Canada

Coordinates: 45.5033°N 73.6188°W

- Faculté de médecine de l'Université de Montréal
- Former names: School of Medecine and Surgery of Montreal
- Type: School of Medicine
- Established: 1843
- Parent institution: Université de Montréal
- Dean: Hélene Boisjoly
- Location: 2900, boulevard Édouard-Montpetit, Montreal, Quebec, H3T 1J4, Canada
- Campus: Urban
- Language: French
- Website: Official website

The Faculty of Medicine (French: Faculté de médecine) is one of four medical schools in Quebec. The faculty is part of the Université de Montréal and is located in Montreal and Trois-Rivières.

It is frequently ranked as the top medical school in the francophone world and the top francophone medical school in Canada. In 2004, it received an endowment by Pfizer worth $1.8 million for a chair in atherosclerosis. It was awarded a million-dollar grant for the study of leukemia in 2008.

The Faculty offers a variety of undergraduate programs, graduate programs, the Doctor of Medicine, and several postgraduate medical programs.

In partnership with the Centre de pédagogie appliquée aux sciences de la santé (CPASS), the Faculty provides practicing physicians, trainers, students and researchers with colloquia, online tools and continuing professional development and health sciences education activities.
