= Régie de l'assurance maladie du Québec =

Health insurance board of Quebec, Canada

The Régie de l'assurance maladie du Québec (French pronunciation: [ʁeʒi də lasyʁɑ̃s maladi dy kebɛk], RAMQ, often pronounced "ram-q" by French and English speakers alike) is the government health insurance board in the province of Quebec, Canada. The no-longer-official English name is Quebec Health Insurance Board.

Under the system, most residents of Quebec have basic health coverage. There are a few exceptions, such as college or university students from other provinces who are covered by their home province plans, international college and university students who generally purchase private plans from their student unions, and certain foreign workers, who either purchase private insurance plans or go uninsured.

The Régie de l'assurance maladie du Québec was established in 1969 for the purpose of setting up the public health insurance plan. Ever since, the Régie has contributed to the development and smooth operation of Quebec's healthcare system.

Under Canadian federal law, all citizens and permanent residents are entitled to free basic health care, wherein each province administers their own system. Unlike most other provincial health plans, the Quebec health plan covers prescription medicines for many people. The annual cost varies depending upon each person's situation. People who are eligible for private prescription coverage are required to enroll in the private plan and are not eligible for the RAMQ prescription plan.

The only medical services that are not covered by the Régie are those considered not medically necessary, such as services requested on the basis of cosmetic reasons. A majority of physicians in Quebec participate in the plan, implying that they are remunerated directly by the board for the services they provide.

The Régie issues a health insurance card to persons eligible for the Quebec Health Insurance Plan. Because the card gives access to insured healthcare services, it is important for insured persons to carry their card with them at all times.

There are 8.2 million holders of this card issued by RAMQ. The card was first implemented by Quebec's Health Minister Claude Castonguay in 1970, considered one of the key persons in the establishment of public medical insurance and healthcare in Canada.

== See also ==
- Alberta Health Care Insurance Plan
- Ontario Health Insurance Plan
