= McGill Faculty of Medicine and Health Sciences =

Medical school of McGill University

Coordinates: 45.50835°N 73.58155°W

- Faculté de médecine et des sciences de la santé de l'Université McGill (French)
- Type: Public medical school
- Established: 1829; 197 years ago
- Parent institution: McGill University
- Dean: Lesley Fellows
- Students: 688 MDCM, 35 MD-PhD, 10 MD-MBA
- Location: Montreal, Quebec, Canada
- Campus: Urban
- Language: English
- Website: mcgill.ca/medhealthsci

The McGill Faculty of Medicine and Health Sciences is one of the constituent faculties of McGill University. It was established in 1829 after the Montreal Medical Institution was incorporated into McGill College as the college's first faculty; it was the first medical faculty to be established in Canada. The Faculty awarded McGill’s first degree, and Canada’s first medical degree, to William Leslie Logie in 1833.”

There have been at least two Nobel Prize laureates who have completed their entire education at McGill University including MD at the Faculty of Medicine and Health Sciences including Andrew Schally (Nobel Prize in Physiology or Medicine 1977) and David H. Hubel (Nobel Prize in Physiology or Medicine 1981).

== History ==
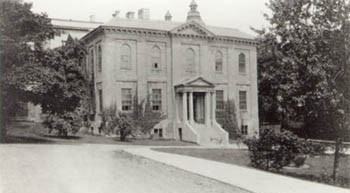
McGill's medical building 1872–1906

The Montreal Medical Institution was established in 1823 by four physicians, Andrew Fernando Holmes, John Stephenson, William Caldwell and William Robertson, all of whom had been trained at the University of Edinburgh Medical School, and were involved in the foundation of the Montreal General Hospital. In 1829 it was incorporated into McGill College as the new College's first faculty; it thus became the first Faculty of Medicine in Canada. A highly didactic approach to medical education called the "Edinburgh curriculum", which consisted of two six-month courses of basic science lectures followed by two years of "walking the wards" at The Montreal General Hospital, was instituted. From 1833 to 1877, the Faculty followed the pattern set by the University of Edinburgh and required graduating students to submit an "inaugural dissertation." A database of these is available.

Sir William Dawson, the principal of McGill, was instrumental in garnering resources for the faculty, and pioneering contributions from Thomas Roddick, Francis Shepherd, George Ross, and Sir William Osler helped transform the Victorian‑era medical school into a leader in modern medical education. Osler graduated from McGill’s MDCM program in 1872, and as one of the four founding professors, helped establish the Johns Hopkins School of Medicine when it opened in 1893.

In 1905, the Bishop's University Medical Faculty Montreal who established in Montreal in 1871 closed and amalgamated with McGill University to create the new McGill University Faculty of Medicine, where BU graduates such as Maude Abbott, one of the Canada's earliest female medical graduates transferred to work for McGill as the Curator of the McGill Medical Museum.

The McGill University Health Centre was part of a $2.355 billion Redevelopment Project on three sites – the Glen, the Montreal General and Lachine hospitals. A new $1.300 billion MUHC Glen site fully integrated super-hospital complex opened in 2015.

A new satellite campus for McGill Medicine for a French stream MD, CM program was established in 2020 for the Outaouais region with a graduating class size of 24 and total of 96 in the program. The establishment of the program is part of a $32.5-million construction project of the Groupe de médecine familiale universitaire (GMF-U) de Gatineau.

In September 2020, the Faculty of Medicine changed its name to the Faculty of Medicine and Health Sciences to reflect the growth of interprofessionalism and the diversity in the Faculty of Medicine.

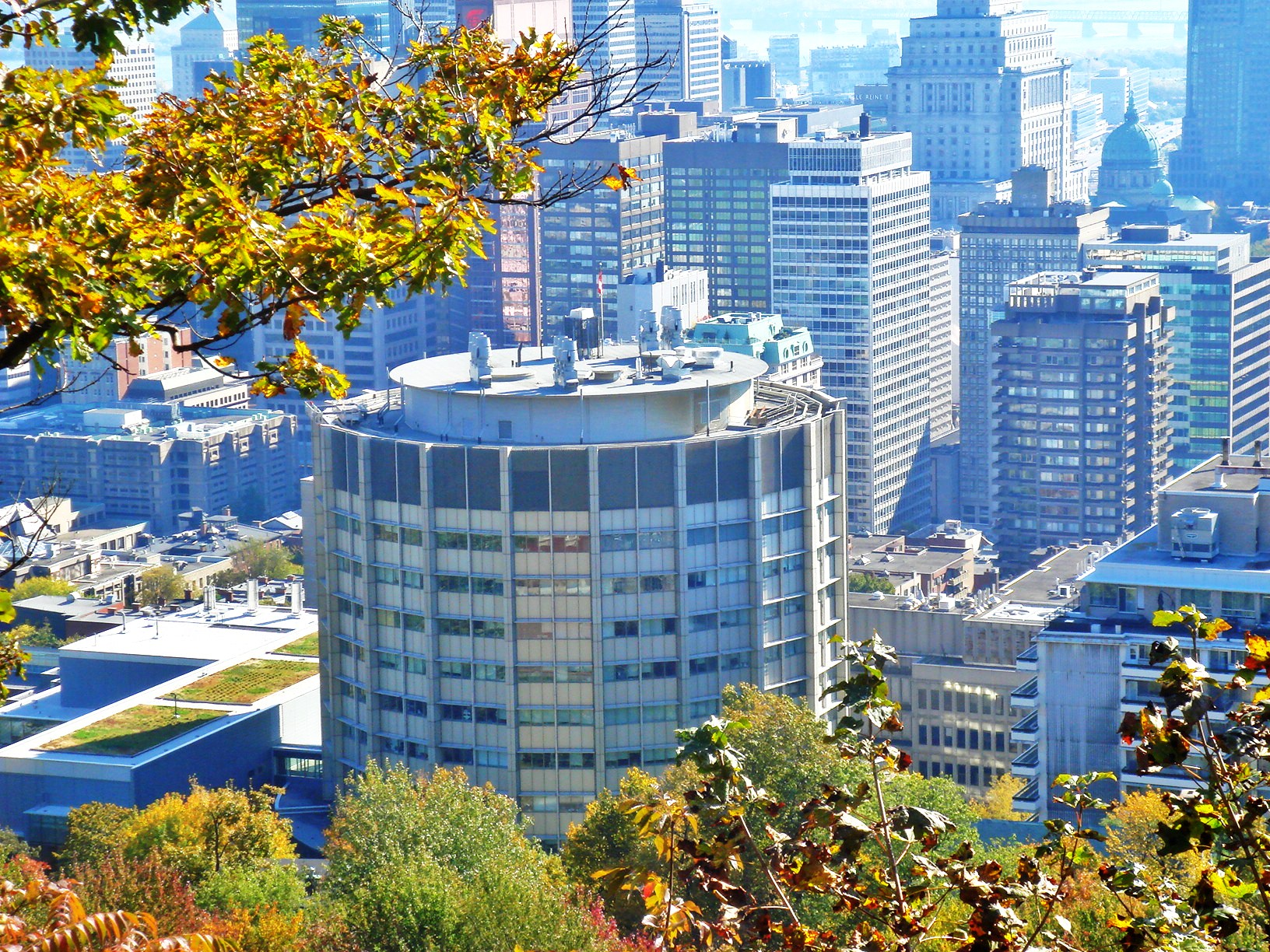
McIntyre Medical Building in the heart of McGill's downtown campus

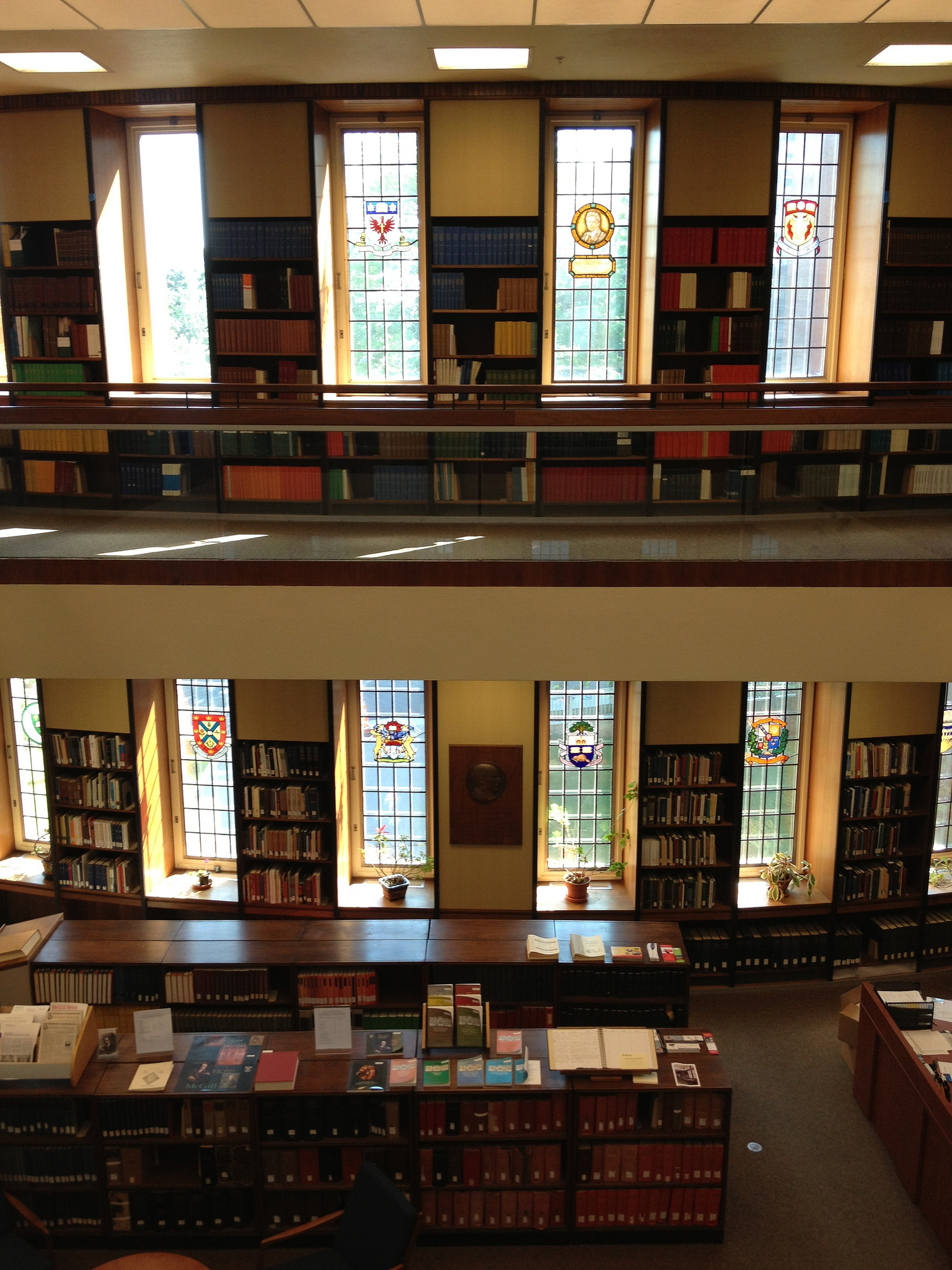
The Osler Library, Canada's foremost scholarly resource for the history of medicine, one of the most important libraries of its type in North America.

== Education ==
The faculty offers a four-year MDCM degree in medicine and surgery. The Faculty of Medicine and Health Sciences also offers joint degree programs with other disciplines including business (M.D.–M.B.A.) and science/engineering (M.D.–Ph.D.). There is also an accelerated program for selected graduates of the Quebec college system (PRE-MED-ADM or MED-P) that combines one year of science curriculum with the four-year M.D., C.M. degrees.

It is closely affiliated with the McGill University Faculty of Dentistry. Students of dentistry receive instruction together with their medical student colleagues for the first 18 months of their professional training.

The faculty includes six schools: the School of Medicine, the Ingram School of Nursing, the School of Physical and Occupational Therapy, the School of Communication Sciences and Disorders, the School of Population & Global Health and the School of Biomedical Sciences. It also includes several research centres involved in studies on, for example, pain, neuroscience, and aging. Most of the non-clinical parts of the faculty are housed in the McIntyre Medical Sciences Building ("The Beer Can", “McMed”), situated on McGill's downtown campus on the south side of Mount Royal between Avenue des Pins and Avenue Docteur-Penfield.

The McGill University Faculty of Medicine was the first medical school in Canada to institute a joint MD–MBA program in 1997 in collaboration with the Desautels Faculty of Management. This program allowed students to complete both degrees in five years.

== Affiliations ==
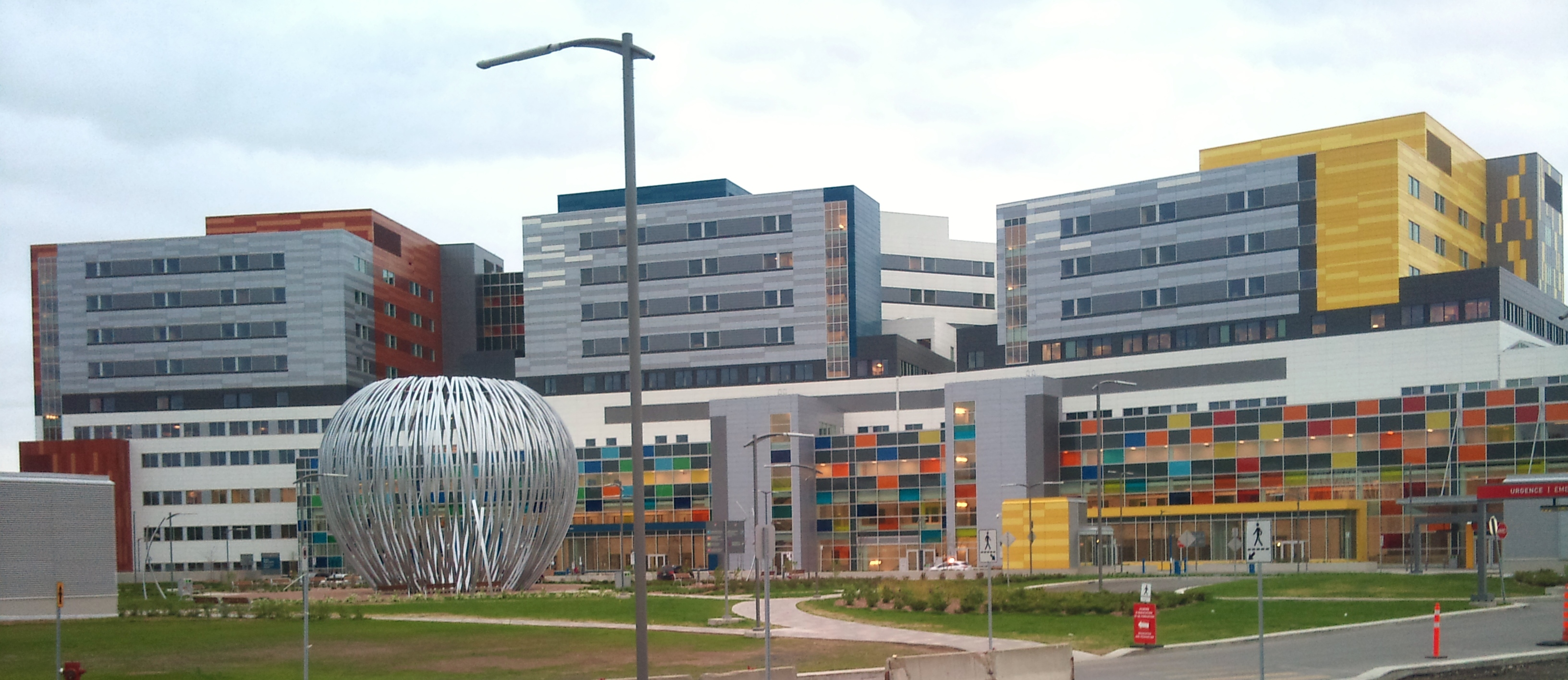
McGill University Health Centre's super hospital complex at the Glen Site opened in 2015

=== McGill University Health Centre ===
- Glen site
  - Royal Victoria Hospital
  - Montreal Children's Hospital
  - Montreal Chest Institute
- Montreal General Hospital
  - Allan Memorial Institute (contains MGH's outpatient psychiatry)
- Montreal Neurological Hospital
- Hôpital de Lachine

=== McGill affiliate hospitals ===
- Lakeshore General Hospital
- Jewish General Hospital
- St. Mary's Hospital
- Douglas Mental Health University Institute
- Shriners Hospital for Children
- Hôpital de Gatineau – Groupe de médecine de famille universitaire (GMF-U) de Gatineau
- Jewish Rehabilitation Hospital (JRH)
- Mount Sinai Hospital Montreal

== Reputation ==
McGill’s Faculty of Medicine and Health Sciences has produced faculty members and alumni who have contributed to developments in their respective fields. It is ranked as the number 1 medical school nationally in Canada by Maclean's for 20 straight years (including the most recent ranking for 2025). McGill's Medical School has also consistently ranked in the top medical schools worldwide and ranked 18th worldwide on the 2024 QS World University Ranking of top medical schools world-wide. McGill's Faculty of Medicine and Health Sciences has also produced a number of Rhodes Scholars (Cecil James Falconer Parsons, Munroe Bourne, Douglas George Cameron, Alan G. Kendall, Robert Murray Mundle, John Doehu Stubbs, Geoffrey E. Dougherty, Brian James Ward, Lesley Fellows, Anne Andermann, Astrid-Christoffersen-Deb, Aleksandra Leligdowicz, Benjamin Mappin-Kasirer, Alexander Lachapelle), including one in the 2018 cohort. For medical school students entering in fall 2020, the mean four-year undergraduate GPA was 3.87 (excluding graduate GPA), and the mean MCAT score was 32.1 (85th–88th percentile).

Admissions to the McGill Faculty of Medicine and Health Sciences M.D., C.M. program are highly competitive with an acceptance rate of 5.7% for the Class of 2026.

The Department of Anatomy and Physiology at McGill University ranked 3rd globally in the 2017 QS World University Rankings after Oxford University and Cambridge.

== The Flexner Report ==
The Flexner Report, published in 1910 and commissioned by the Carnegie Foundation, performed a critical evaluation of medical education in the US and Canada; it aimed to evaluate and reform the fragmented and substandard system of medical training by promoting rigorous scientific standards and closing poorly performing schools. In this landmark report, McGill University’s Faculty of Medicine was highly praised as one of the premier medical schools in North America. Flexner commended McGill for its rigorous academic standards, well-qualified faculty, and strong emphasis on scientific and clinical training. Unlike many institutions criticized in the report for low admission requirements and inadequate facilities, McGill was held up as a model of modern medical education, alongside Johns Hopkins School of Medicine, which was lauded as the archetypal model medical school (and founded by McGill alumnus Sir William Osler).

== Harry Houdini incident ==
In October 1926, renowned magician Harry Houdini was giving a lecture on exposed mediums and spiritualists at McGill University and had invited medical students to his dressing room at Montreal's Princess Theatre. J. Gordon Whitehead, a medical student and boxer, had asked Houdini if he could take a sudden punch to the stomach, as had rumoured to be the case; Houdini received several unexpected punches. Feeling ill later that evening and after refusing medical treatment, Houdini was diagnosed with acute appendicitis a couple of days later and died on October 31, 1926. It remains a controversy whether Houdini died as a result of the punches or was simply unaware of a current appendicitis prior, and Whitehead was never charged.

== Notable faculty and alumni ==
=== Alumni ===
Canadians unless otherwise noted.

- Maude Abbott — One of Canada's earliest female medical graduates, international expert on congenital heart disease, namesake of Maude Abbott Medical Museum Maude Abbott received her M.D. C.M. degree from Bishop's College in 1894 as McGill did not then admit females to study medicine. Bishop's College Medical School was absorbed by McGill in 1905.
- Bernard Nathanson M.D., C.M. 1949 — obstetrician/gynecologist
- Victor Dzau M.D., C.M. 1972 — president of the Institute of Medicine of the National Academy of Sciences, former president and CEO of Duke University Medical Center
- Daniel Borsuk O.Q., M.S.C., B.Sc. 2000, M.D., C.M. 2006, M.B.A. 2006 — performed first face transplant in Canada
- Thomas Chang O.C., M.D., C.M. (1961), Ph.D., FRCP(C), FRS(C) — pioneer in biomedical engineering, “Father of Artificial Cells”
- George Edward Bomberry M.D., C.M. 1875 First indigenous graduate of McGill University. Bomberry, a hereditary chief of the Cayuga (Gayogohó:nợ), was born on the Tuscarora Reserve on April 14, 1849. He died on January 29, 1879.
- Robert Thirsk O.C., O.B.C., M.D., C.M. (1982), M.S., M.B.A. — engineer and physician, astronaut, and chancellor emeritus University of Calgary.
- Joannie Rochette M.D., C.M. 2020 — medal-winning Olympic figure skater
- E. Fuller Torrey M.D., C.M. 1963 — psychiatrist and schizophrenia researcher, founder of the Treatment Advocacy Center
- Maurice Brodie M.D., C.M. 1928 — polio researcher, who developed the polio vaccine in 1935
- Jack Wright M.D., C.M. 1928, — internationally top-ranked tennis star, winner of three Canadian Open men's singles titles and four doubles titles
- Mark Cohen M.D., C.M. 1992 — ophthalmologist, laser eye surgeon and co-founder of LASIK MD
- Avi Wallerstein — ophthalmologist, laser eye surgeon and co-founder of LASIK MD
- Charles Scriver M.D., C.M. 1955 — pediatrician and biochemical geneticist
- Dafydd Williams O.C., O.Ont., M.D., C.M. 1983, M.S., M.B.A. — physician, public speaker, CEO, author and multi-mission astronaut.
- David R. Boyd M.D., C.M. 1963, — trauma surgeon, and developer of Regional Trauma Emergency Medical Services (EMS).
- Charles R. Drew M.D., C.M. 1933 — father of modern blood-banking; namesake of Charles R. Drew University of Medicine and Science; founding medical director of the Red Cross Blood Bank in the United States
- Richard Goldbloom O.C., O.N.S., M.D., C.M. 1949 — pediatrician, chancellor of Dalhousie University 1986–2004
- Paul Bruce Beeson M.D., C.M. 1933 — professor of medicine, specializing in infectious diseases; discoverer of interleukin-1
- Ian Stevenson M.D., C.M. 1943 — Canadian-born U.S. psychiatrist
- Ken Evoy M.D., C.M. 1979 — Emergency physician, entrepreneur, founder and chairman of the board of SiteSell
- William Wright - M.D., C.M. 1848 — first person of colour to earn a medical degree in Canada
- Laurent Duvernay-Tardif M.D., C.M. 2018 — former NFL offensive guard
- Phil Gold, B.Sc. 1957, M.Sc. 1961, M.D., C.M. 1961, Ph.D. 1965 — physician, scientist, and professor, discoverer of carcinoembryonic antigen (CEA), the first biomarker for cancer
- Thomas A. Ban Res. Psychiatry 1960 — founding director of the first Division of Psychopharmacology in a Department of Psychiatry in the world
- Haile Debas M.D., C.M. 1963 — Dean of the UCSF School of Medicine from 1993 to 2003
- Phil Edwards, M.D., C.M. 1936 — "Man of Bronze", Canada's most-decorated Olympian for many years, and expert in tropical diseases
- David Goltzman, B.Sc. 1966, M.D., C.M. 1968 — physician, scientist, and professor
- Noni MacDonald, pediatric infectious diseases expert, former Dean of Dalhousie University Faculty of Medicine 1999–2003 and first woman in Canada to be named Dean of a medical school
- Patricia Baird M.D., C.M. 1963 — British medical geneticist
- Vivek Goel, M.D., C.M. 1984 — president and vice-chancellor of the University of Waterloo
- Katherine O'Brien, M.D., C.M. 1988 — infectious disease expert; Director of the World Health Organization's Department of Immunization, Vaccines and Biologicals
- Frederick Lowy, M.D., C.M. 1959 — former President and Vice-Chancellor of Concordia University
- Andrew Fernando Holmes — first dean and co-founder of McGill College Medical Faculty. Holmes received his medical degree from Edinburgh University in 1819; McGill awarded him an (honorary) An Eundem M.D. in 1843.
- Chi-Ming Chow M.D., C.M. 1990 — – cardiologist and board member of the Heart and Stroke Foundation
- David Hunter Hubel B.Sc. 1947, M.D., C.M. 1951 — Nobel laureate in Physiology (1981)
- Joanne Liu M.D., C.M. — International President of Médecins Sans Frontières (Doctors Without Borders)
- Colin MacLeod M.D., C.M. 1932 — Canadian-American geneticist, identified DNA as hereditary material in the body, Avery–MacLeod–McCarty experiment
- Pavel Hamet Ph.D. Exp. Med. — Czech researcher and microbiologist
- John Lancelot Todd B.A. 1898, M.D., C.M. 1900 — parasitologist
- Claude Roy — one of the founding fathers of the field of paediatric gastroenterology
- Ronald Melzack Ph.D. 1954 — developed the McGill Pain Questionnaire
- Jack Wennberg M.D., C.M. 1961 — pioneer in public health of medicine and founder of The Dartmouth Institute for Health Policy and Clinical Practice
- Eric Berne BSc 1931, M.D., C.M. 1935 — psychiatrist who created the theory of transactional analysis
- William Reginald Morse M.D., C.M. 1902 — one four founders of the West China Union University in Chengdu, Sichuan, in 1914; went on to become dean of the medical faculty
- George F. Bond M.D., C.M. 1945 — United States Navy physician, leader in the field of undersea and hyperbaric medicine and the "Father of Saturation Diving
- Robert Murray – B.A., M.A., M.D., C.M. 1943 – British Bacteriologist
- Clarke Fraser Ph.D. 1945, M.D., C.M. 1950 — pioneer in medical genetics
- Bernard Zinman M.D., C.M., Res. Internal Med. — Canadian endocrinologist and highly-cited diabetes researcher
- Kami Kandola M.D., C.M. 1992 — Indo-Canadian physician and the Chief Public Health Officer for the Northwest Territories, Canada
- Robert McKechnie M.D., C.M. 1886 — chancellor of the University of British Columbia
- Robert Benjamin Greenblatt M.D., C.M. 1932 — prominent endocrinologist, pioneered endocrinology as a specialty in medicine, known for the development of the sequential oral contraceptive pill and the oral fertility pill
- Perry Rosenthal M.D., C.M. 1958 — professor of ophthalmology at Harvard Medical School and developer of the first gas-permeable scleral contact lens
- William Feindel M.D., C.M. 1945 — neurosurgeon and neuroscientist
- Anne Monique Nuyt Fellowship in Perinatal and Neonatal Medicine 1993 — Professor of Neonatology at Université de Montréal
- Francis Alexander Caron Scrimger M.D., C.M. 1905 — Lieutenant Colonel in the Canadian Army recipient of the Victoria Cross
- Cara Tannenbaum M.D., C.M. 1994 — geriatric medicine physician and researcher
- Arnold Johnson M.D., C.M. — cardiologist pioneer, performed first heart catherization in Canada
- T. Wesley Mills M.D., C.M. 1878 — physician, Canada's first professional physiologist
- Mark Wainberg O.C., O.Q., B.Sc. 1966 — HIV/AIDS researcher, discoverer of lamivudine, Director of the McGill University AIDS Centre,
- Santa J. Ono Ph.D. 1991 — immunologist and eye researcher, President & Vice-Chancellor University of British Columbia
- William Osler M.D., C.M. 1872 — professor, medical pioneer, developed bedside teaching, one of the four founders of the Johns Hopkins School of Medicine
- Betty Price M.D., C.M. 1980 — anesthesiologist and American politician/member of the Georgia House of Representatives
- Edward Llewellyn-Thomas M.D., C.M. 1955 — English scientist, university professor and science fiction author
- Rocke Robertson B.Sc. 1932, M.D., C.M. 1936 — physician
- Emil Skamene residency in allergy and immunology 1974 — immunologist
- William Henry Drummond — Irish-born Canadian poet, physician. Drummond actually failed his medical degree at McGill but received his M.D.C.M. from Bishop's College. When Bishop's merged with McGill he, like several other professors there, received an Ad Eundem M.D.C.M. degree from McGill in 1905.
- Albert Ernest Forsythe M.D., C.M. 1930 — physician and pioneer aviator
- Harold Griffith M.D., C.M. 1922 — anaesthesiologist, pioneered the use of curare as a muscle relaxant, formed and was first President of World Federation of Societies of Anaesthesiologists
- Alice Benjamin Res. OB/GYN 1978 — maternal-fetal medicine specialist and pioneer in the field; performed Canada's first successful diabetic renal transplant and pregnancy
- James Horace King M.D., C.M. 1895 — physician, Canadian senator, and governor and one of the leaders of the establishment of the American College of Surgeons
- Arnold Aberman O.C. B.Sc. 1965, M.D., C.M. 1967 — Dean of University of Toronto Faculty of Medicine 1992–1999, and instrumental founder/consulting dean of Northern Ontario School of Medicine
- Victor Goldbloom O.Q., O.C., M.D., C.M. 1945 — pediatrician, politician
- Doris Howell M.D., C.M. 1949 — pediatric oncologist, known for her pioneering work in palliative care, "mother of hospice"
- William B. Hutchinson M.D., C.M. 1935 — American surgeon, founder of both the Pacific Northwest Research Foundation and the Fred Hutchinson Cancer Center
- Franklin White M.D., C.M. 1969 — public health scientist
- Jon Gerrard M.D., C.M. 1971 — Canadian Member of Parliament, and secretary of state in the Jean Chrétien government
- Marc Baltzan M.D., C.M. 1953 — nephrologist, pioneer in the field of kidney research
- Michel Chrétien MSc. 1962 — pioneering neuroendocrinologist
- Martin Henry Dawson M.D., C.M. 1923 — infectious disease researcher, first person in history to inject penicillin into a patient, 1940
- Paul Polak Internship 1959 — psychiatrist, founder of International Development Enterprises (iDE) and D-Rev
- Walter Mackenzie — Canadian surgeon and academic, Dean of University of Alberta Faculty of Medicine and Dentistry 1959–1974
- John Thomas Finnie M.D., C.M. 1869 — physician and Quebec politician
- Kathryn Stephenson Res. Plastics — American plastic surgeon, first American woman to be board-certified plastic surgeon and first woman editor of the journal Plastic and Reconstructive Surgery
- Maurice Dongier Residency Psychiatry 1954 — Canadian neuropsychiatrist at the Douglas Hospital Research Centre
- David Leffell M.D., C.M. 1981 — internationally recognized dermatologic surgeon, founder and chief of the Dermatologic Surgery Program at Yale School of Medicine
- Philip Seeman M.D., C.M. 1960 — Canadian schizophrenia researcher and neuropharmacologist, known for his research on dopamine receptors
- Munroe Bourne M.D., C.M. 1940 — physician, Olympic medal-winning swimmer, Rhodes Scholar, Major in the Canadian Army
- George Genereux M.D., C.M. 1960 — diagnostic radiologist and Olympic gold medalist and inductee in the Canadian Sports Hall of Fame
- James John Edmund Guerin M.D., C.M. 1878 — politician, Mayor of Montreal
- Peter Macklem O.C., M.D., C.M. 1956 — cardio-pulmonary physician and researcher, founding director of the Meakins-Christie Laboratories
- Richard Margolese O.C., M.D., C.M. — surgeon, researcher and pioneer in treatment of breast cancers
- Cluny Macpherson M.D., C.M. 1901 — physician and inventor of the British Smoke Hood (an early gas mask)
- Aubrey Tingle Ph.D. 1973 — professor emeritus in the Department of Pediatrics at the University of British Columbia
- Thomas George Roddick M.D., C.M. 1868 — surgeon, politician and founder of the Medical Council of Canada
- Andrew Schally Ph.D. 1957 — Nobel laureate in Physiology (1977)
- Vincenzo Di Nicola BA, 1976; Res. Psychiatry 1986 — Italian-Canadian psychologist, psychiatrist and family therapist, and philosopher of mind
- Maurice LeClair M.D., C.M. 1951 — Canadian physician, businessman, civil servant, and academic; Dean of the Faculty of Medicine at the Université de Sherbrooke
- David Goldbloom M.D., C.M. 1981 — Canadian psychiatrist, Professor Emeritus of Psychiatry at the University of Toronto
- Arthur Vineberg B.Sc. 1924, M.D., C.M. 1928, Ph.D. 1933 — cardiac surgeon, pioneer of revascularization
- W. Webber Kelly M.D., C.M. 1903 — prominent American physician, president of the Green Bay Football Corporation
- George Siber M.D., C.M. 1970 — medical researcher and vaccine expert
- Esther Sternberg B.Sc. 1972, M.D., C.M. 1974, — director for the Andrew Weil Center for Integrative Medicine at the University of Arizona
- Antoine Hakim — Canadian engineer and physician, former CEO of the Canadian Stroke Network Neurology Residency at McGill.
- Sir Charles-Eugène-Napoléon Boucher de Boucherville M.D. 1843, Physician, politician, two-time Premier of Quebec
- R. Tait McKenzie M.D., C.M. 1892 — pioneer of modern physiotherapy
- David Saint-Jacques Res. FM 2007 — astronaut with the Canadian Space Agency (CSA), astrophysicist, engineer, and a physician
- C. Miller Fisher described lacunar strokes and identified transient ischemic attacks as stroke precursors. Miller received his M.D. from the University of Toronto but had a Residency at McGill
- John S. Meyer M.D., C.M., M.S. — renowned American neurologist, founding professor and Chairman of Neurology at Wayne State University School of Medicine
- Marla Shapiro M.D., C.M. 1979 — primary medical consultant for CTV News
- David Francis Clyde M.D., C.M. 1948 — British malariologist, former director of the Johns Hopkins School of Hygiene and Public Health
- Guy Breton Res. Diag. Rad. 1978 — radiologist, rector of the Université de Montréal
- Sherry Chou M.D., C.M. 2001 — neurologist and an Associate Professor of Neurology and Chief of Neurocritical Care at the Northwestern University Feinberg School of Medicine
- John C. Beck, M.D., C.M. 1952 — American physician and academic
- Yvette Bonny, Fellowship — Haitian-Canadian pediatrician.
- Sir Andrew Macphail M.D., C.M. 1891 – Canadian physician, intellectual, and prolific writer
- Helene Langevin, M.D., C.M. 1978 — Director of the National Center for Complementary and Integrative Health (NCCIH)
- Richard Maurice Bucke, M.D., C.M. 1862 — Canadian psychiatrist known for his work Cosmic Consciousness: A Study in the Evolution of the Human Mind
- Robert Bell M.D., C.M. 1878 – prominent Canadian geologist, explorer, named over 3,000 geographical features
- Meyer Balter M.D., C.M. 1981 — pulmonologist, medical researcher, and professor
- Courtney Howard Residency Emergency Medicine 2008 — politician, President of the Canadian Association of Physicians for the Environment
- Ken Croitoru, M.D., C.M. 1981 — gastroenterologist, medical researcher, and Crohn's disease expert
- Edward William Archibald M.D., C.M. 1896 Canada's first neurosurgeon, thoracic surgical pioneer
- Silver Quilty — football player, referee, coach and sport administrator
- Onye Nnorom M.D., C.M. 2007 — Associate Chief Medical Officer of Health for the province of Ontario
- Balfour Mount Res. Surg. 1973 — urologic-cancer surgeon, father of palliative care in North America
- Mary Runnells Bird M.D., C.M. 1900 — Canadian surgeon, "one of Canada's first women doctors"
- Barry A. Love Res. Peds. 1996 — American cardiologist
- Moussa B. H. Youdim PhD 1966 — Iranian-Israeli neuroscientist, discoverer of l-deprenyl (Selegiline) and rasagiline (Azilect)
- Stefanie Green M.D., C.M. 1993 — Canadian physician known for her contributions to the field of assisted dying
- Hilal bin Ali Al Sabti Res. Cardiac Surgery 2005, MS 2006 — cardiothoracic surgeon, Minister of Health, Oman
- Casey Albert Wood ophthalmologist and comparative zoologist. Casey Wood received his M.D.C.M. degree from Bishop's College. When Bishop's merged with McGill he, like several other professors there, received an Ad Eundem MD degree from McGill in 1906.

=== Current and past faculty members ===
- Madhukar Pai — expert on global health and epidemiology, specifically tuberculosis
- Nahum Sonenberg — Israeli-Canadian expert virologist, microbiologist, and biochemist, discoverer of mRNA 5' cap-binding protein
- Rolando Del Maestro — Italian-Canadian neurosurgeon and pioneer in "awake brain surgery"
- Jonathan Meakins B.Sc. 1962 — surgeon, immunologist
- Heinz Lehmann Canadian psychiatrist, expert in treatment of schizophrenia the "father of modern psychopharmacology."
- Maurice McGregor South-African cardiologist
- Phillip D. Zamore American molecular biologist and biochemist
- Morag Park Scottish-Canadian breast cancer and genomics researcher
- Alan Evans neuroscientist, prominent researcher, expert in brain mapping
- Pavel Hamet Ph.D. Exp. Med. — Czech researcher and microbiologist
- David S Rosenblatt, M.D., C.M. 1970 — prominent medical geneticist, pediatrician; expert in the field of inborn errors of folate and vitamin B12 metabolism
- Michael Meaney — researcher and expert in biological psychiatry, neurology, and neurosurgery
- Thomas J. Hudson — Canadian genome scientist known for his involvement in the International HapMap Project
- Brenda Milner Ph.D. 1952 — neuropsychologist, "founder of neuropsychology"
- Terence Coderre — researcher, pain expert, Harold Griffith Chair in Anaesthesia Research
- Judes Poirier — researcher, professor of Medicine and Psychiatry, director of the Molecular Neurobiology Unit at the Douglas Mental Health University Institute
- Wilder Penfield — neurosurgery pioneer, first director of the Montreal Neurological Institute and Montreal Neurological Hospital
- David Goltzman, B.Sc. 1966, M.D., C.M. 1968 — physician, scientist, and professor
- George Karpati, nenowned Canadian neurologist and neuroscientist
- Johannes Holtfreter, German-American developmental biologist
- John J. M. Bergeron, cell biologist and biochemist, known for discovery of calnexin, endosomal signalling and organellar proteomics
- Charles Philippe Leblond — pioneer of cell biology and stem cell research
- Jacques Genest — cardiovascular researcher
- Bernard Belleau — Canadian molecular pharmacologist best known for his role in the discovery of HIV drug Lamivudine
- Henry Friesen — Canadian endocrinologist, discoverer of human prolactin
- Hans Selye — Hungarian-Canadian endocrinologist
- James C. Hogg — expert in Chronic Obstructive Pulmonary Disease
- Augusto Claudio Cuello — Professor in the Department of Pharmacology and Therapeutics and Charles E. Frosst/Merck Chair in Pharmacology
- Theodore Sourkes — Canadian biochemist and neuropsychopharmacologist, expert in Parkinson's disease
- Jonathan Campbell Meakins — Physician and Dean of the Faculty of Medicine 1941–1948, first President and Founder of the Royal College of Physicians and Surgeons of Canada
- Albert Aguayo — Canadian neurologist and assistant professor in the department of Neurology and Neurosurgery, former president International Brain Research Organization
- Bartha Maria Knoppers — Dutch-Canadian medical ethics expert
- Abdul Rahman Al-Sumait — Kuwaiti humanitarian, physician, known for his philanthropic works in more than 29 African countries
- John J. R. Macleod — co-discoverer of insulin, Nobel Prize in Physiology or Medicine (1923) laureate
- Rémi Quirion — first Chief Scientist of Quebec
- Richard A. Murphy — American neuroscientist. Director of the Montreal Neurological Institute, president and CEO of the Salk Institute for Biological Studies, and president of the California Institute for Regenerative Medicine
- Gabriella Gobbi — Italo-Canadian psychiatrist and neuroscientist
- Lydia Giberson — Canadian-born psychiatrist and pioneering Metropolitan Life Insurance Company executive
- Marvin Kwitko — Canadian ophthalmologist who pioneered in cataract surgery and laser eye surgery
- Donald Ewen Cameron — Scottish-born psychiatrist known for his involvement in Project MKUltra
- Joseph B. Martin — Dean of the Harvard Medical School, former chair of neurology and neurosurgery
- Barbara E. Jones — Canadian neuroscientist, professor emerita in the McGill University Department of Neurology and Neurosurgery
- Gustavo Turecki — Canadian psychiatrist, suicidologist, neuroscientist
- Beverley Pearson Murphy — endocrinologist, developed a standard method for the measurement of thyroxine
- Frederick Andermann — neurologist and expert in epilepsy, namesake for Andermann syndrome
- Juda Hirsch Quastel — pioneer in neurochemistry and soil metabolism; Director of the McGill University-Montreal General Hospital Research Institute
- John Dossetor — Canadian physician and bioethicist who is notable for co–coordinating the first kidney transplant in Canada and the Commonwealth
- Ouida Ramón-Moliner — Canadian anaesthetist
- Joseph Morley Drake M.D., C.M. 1861 — British Physiologist
- Margaret Lock — British medical anthropologist
- Charles Hollenberg — Canadian diabetes researcher, founded Banting & Best Diabetes Centre, University of Toronto
- Allan Blair M.D., C.M. 1928 — professor, notorious for having purposely being bitten by Black Widow spider and developing its treatment protocol
- Shyamala Gopalan — breast cancer researcher in the Faculty of Medicine and McGill-affiliated Lady Davis Institute for Medical Research; mother of U.S. Vice President Kamala Harris

== See also ==
- Osler Library of the History of Medicine
- McIntyre Medical Sciences Building
- McGill University Health Centre
- McGill University
- McGill University Life Sciences Research Complex
- Montreal Neurological Institute
