= Palter =

Palter is a surname. Notable people with the surname include:

- Jesse Palter, American singer-songwriter
- Lew Palter (1928–2023), American actor
- Morris Palter, Canadian musician
- Scott Palter (died 2020), American game designer

== See also ==
- Balter
- Halter (surname)
- Paltering, a form of lying by using selective truths to mislead
