= Anderman =

Anderman is a surname. Notable people with the surname include:

- Maureen Anderman (born 1946), American actress
- Sig Anderman (born 1941), American businessman

== See also ==
- Frederick Andermann
- Heinz Rein (pseudonym: Reinhard Andermann)
