= Margolese =

Margolese is a surname. Notable people with the surname include:

- David Margolese (born 1957), Israeli entrepreneur and philanthropist
- Faranak Margolese (born 1972), American-Israeli writer
- Richard Margolese (born 1935), Canadian scientist
