= Arnold Johnson =

Arnold Johnson may refer to:

- Arnold Johnson (activist) (1904–1989), American communist activist
- Arnold Johnson (actor) (1921–2000), American actor
- Arnold Johnson (industrialist) (1906–1960), American industrialist, businessman and owner of the Kansas City Athletics baseball club
- Arnold Johnson (musician) (1893–1975), American big band pianist, arranger, composer and leader
- Arnold Johnson (physician) (1916–2006), Canadian cardiologist
