= David Leffell =

Canadian surgeon and academic

David J. Leffell (born 1956) is a Canadian surgeon who is founder and chief of the Dermatologic Surgery Program at Yale School of Medicine. Leffell is an expert in skin cancer and the Mohs technique, plastic reconstruction, and new technologies in dermatology. He specializes in the diagnosis, treatment, and prevention of melanoma and nonmelanoma skin cancer. He is the David Paige Smith Professor of Dermatology and Surgery, chief of Dermatologic Surgery and Cutaneous Oncology, and former Deputy Dean for Clinical Affairs at Yale University School of Medicine. He serves on the board of Validus Pharmaceuticals and is a trustee of The Hopkins School.

== Education ==
Leffell received his undergraduate degree in biology from Yale College. He returned to Montreal to attend McGill University Faculty of Medicine where he received his MD, CM degree in 1981. He completed residencies in internal medicine at Cornell Cooperating Hospitals and in dermatology at Yale New Haven Hospital. At Yale, he also completed a post-doctoral research year as a National Institutes of Health research fellow. Following his residencies, he completed a fellowship in advanced dermatologic surgery at the University of Michigan. Leffell founded the Dermatologic Surgery and Cutaneous Oncology program at Yale in 1988.

== Research ==
While in medical training, Leffell developed and patented a laser method for measuring the aging of skin. With Douglas Brash and others he has also published work that clarifies the genetic basis of the cancer-causing ultraviolet rays of the sun. Leffell was a member of the international team that discovered PTC1, a tumor suppressor gene that plays a critical role in the development of hereditary and sporadic basal cell cancer. He shares patents for the PTC gene and PTCH protein. In 2012, GenentechRoche introduced an oral medication based on the related hedgehog pathway Leffell also invented a simple office-based method for the treatment of vitiligo, a depigmenting disorder for which treatment is otherwise limited. In collaboration with Susan Mayne, PhD at the Yale School of Public Health, Leffell has researched the role of tanning parlors in the development of skin cancer in young women.

== Publications ==
Leffell is the author or co-author of more than 130 publications. He is an editor of textbook of dermatology, Fitzpatrick’s Dermatology in General Medicine. He is also author of Manual of Skin Surgery (English and Chinese editions), an illustrated textbook of fundamental skin surgery for medical students, residents, and specialties involved in skin surgery. A second English edition was published in 2012. Leffell also wrote Total Skin: The Definitive Guide to Whole Skin Care for Life, a "user-friendly" book intended to educate the general public about skin health. He has held editorial positions with many dermatology journals, including the Archives of Dermatology, The Journal of Dermatologic Surgery and Oncology, and Medical & Surgical Dermatology and is on the editorial board of Faculty of 1000. Leffell has appeared in The Enlightened Bracketologist with a chapter on Longevity and the Final Four of Everything writing on ways to enhance and preserve a youthful appearance. In 2011 Leffell published Connecticut Pastoral, a collection of photographs of the Connecticut Berkshires (Gaoh Press). In 2012, with colleagues Sumaira Aasi and Rossitza Lazova, Leffell published Atlas of Practical Mohs Histopathology.

== Yale Medical Group ==
Leffell has held leadership positions in the clinical practice at Yale since 1996. Leading a team of operations and strategic executives he focused on developing a patient-centered approach. In addition to overseeing a major branding initiative (converting the Yale faculty practice to the Yale Medical Group) and professionalizing the business operations of the organization, he spearheaded initiatives focused on enhanced patient service and integration of clinical research and clinical trials with the clinical practice. Leffell also oversaw the development of the medical billing compliance program and initiated the first program for faculty on the "Business of Medicine". Stephen Rimar who helped develop the program published one of the first textbooks of its kind based on the multidisciplinary lectures intended to provide practicing clinicians with fundamental knowledge of business. In 2010, with colleagues at Yale New Haven Hospital, he led the selection of Epic as the electronic medical record for Yale School of Medicine and the Yale New Haven Health System. Leffell reported on the effort in the CEO Newsletter of the Yale Medical Group. Leffell also believes that the cost/value paradox of academic medical centers is sustainable but requires thoughtful change. The centers, which represent huge capital investment, will always be the high cost providers of healthcare but will also be the source of cost-reducing innovation in medical care. The essay "The Ostrich and the Wolf" appeared in a communication to the faculty and staff of the Yale Medical Group.
