= Balter =

Balter may refer to:

== Companies ==
- Balter Brewing Company, Australian brewery
- Balter, Guth, Aloni & Co., Israeli law firm
- Mike Balter Mallet Company, a percussion mallet manufacturer owned by Avedis Zildjian Company

== People ==
- León Balter (1928–2025), Argentine journalist
- Marcos Balter (born 1974), Brazilian classical composer
- Meyer Balter (born 1954), Canadian physician
- Sam Balter (1909–1998), American basketball player and sportscaster
