= Stefanie Green =

Canadian physician

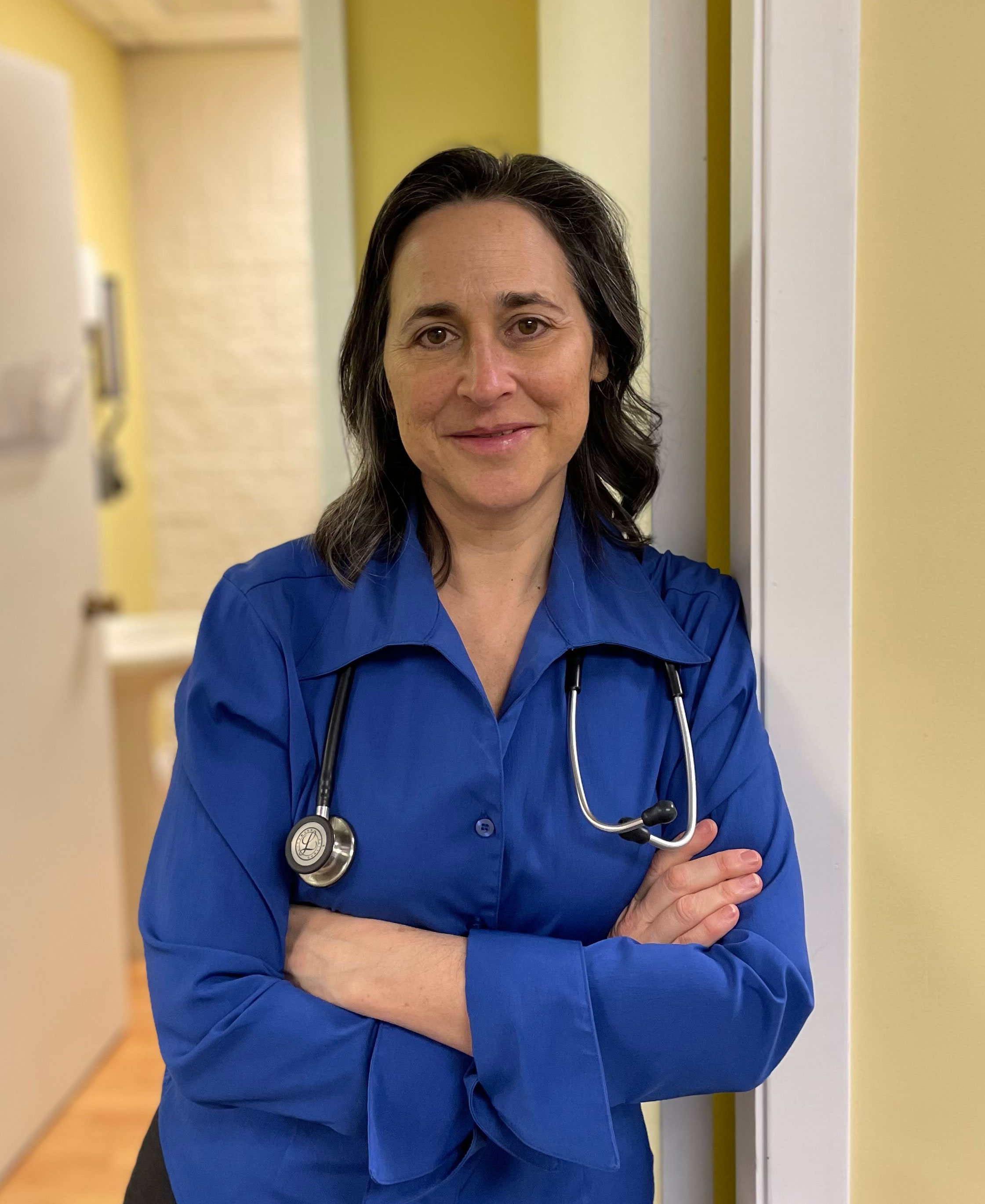
- Green in 2022
- Born: Nova Scotia, Canada
- Education: University of Toronto; McGill University
- Occupation: Physician
- Medical career
- Institutions: Herzl Family Practice Centre, Jewish General Hospital, Montreal; Wellesley Hospital; St. Michael's Hospital; McGill University; University of Toronto; University of British Columbia; University of Victoria
- Sub-specialties: Family Medicine; Palliative Care; Maternal and Neonatal Health; Assisted Dying
- Website: www.stefaniegreen.com

Stefanie Green is a Canadian physician known for her work in medical assistance in dying (MAiD). Green previously spent ten years in general practice and twelve in maternity care.

== Education and career ==
Green grew up in Nova Scotia, Canada, and pursued her education with undergraduate studies at the University of Toronto, followed by medical school at McGill University in Montreal. She completed her residency in Family Medicine at McGill University and further specialized through partial fellowships in palliative care and infant and maternal health. She joined the Clinical Faculty at McGill University, where she was based at the Herzl Family Practice Centre in the Jewish General Hospital in Montreal. She later relocated to Toronto, affiliating with the University of Toronto while working as a teaching clinician associated with Wellesley Hospital, followed by St. Michael's Hospital. In 2002, she relocated once more to Victoria, British Columbia and continued her work as an academic clinician associated with both the University of British Columbia and the University of Victoria. Green worked as a family practitioner with a particular focus on maternity and newborn care.

In 2016, Green shifted her primary focus to Medical Assistance in Dying (MAiD) in British Columbia, Canada. She co-founded the Canadian Association of MAiD Assessors and Providers (CAMAP), becoming its founding president, from 2016–2023. During her tenure, CAMAP grew to become a national professional organization which provides education, training, and peer support for MAiD practitioners. It achieved charitable status in 2021.

Green also serves on the Clinicians Advisory Council of Dying with Dignity Canada.

== Publications and recognition ==
Green has published multiple scholarly articles on assisted dying. Her work has been covered in The New York Times, the Vancouver Sun, and other publications. Since 2021, Green has also co-led the Canadian MAiD Curriculum Project, an ongoing, multi-year, federally-funded, bilingual national MAiD training program, the development of which is documented in a 2024 peer-reviewed study.

Green published her first book, This is Assisted Dying: A Doctor’s Story of Empowering Patients at the End of Life in 2022. It has been published in multiple countries and languages.

Green serves as a Medical Advisor to the BC MAiD Oversight and Advisory Committee. She has provided expert testimony to the Special Joint Committee on Medical Assistance in Dying of the Parliament of Canada. Green is a national and international speaker on the topic of assisted dying, and she has been featured on the TEDx platform with her talk "The Truth About Assisted Dying."
