= Ken Croitoru =

Canadian gastroenterologist

- Education: McGill University Faculty of Medicine and Health Sciences; McMaster University Medical School
- Known for: inflammatory bowel disease
- Scientific career
- Fields: Gastroenterology
- Workplaces: Mount Sinai Hospital, Toronto, Lunenfeld-Tanenbaum Research Institute, University of Toronto

Ken Croitoru is a Canadian gastroenterologist who works at Mount Sinai Hospital in Toronto, a scientist at the Lunenfeld-Tanenbaum Research Institute, and a professor in the Department of Medicine at the University of Toronto. He is best known for his leadership of the Genetic, Environmental, Microbial (GEM) Project, a comprehensive research initiative aiming to understand the triggers of Crohn's disease.

== Career ==
Croitoru is a 1981 graduate of McGill University Faculty of Medicine and Health Sciences. He did post-doctoral training with John Bienenstock at McMaster University Medical School.

Croitoru is a gastroenterologist at Mount Sinai Hospital, and also serves as a scientist at the Lunenfeld-Tanenbaum Research Institute.

Croitoru is the lead investigator and architect of the GEM Project, which was launched in 2008. The project's purpose is to uncover the potential triggers of Crohn's disease by monitoring first-degree relatives of Crohn's patients. These individuals do not have the disease themselves but are at a higher risk of developing it.

== Research findings ==
Under Croitoru's guidance, the GEM Project has made significant strides in Crohn's disease research. For instance, the team has discovered indications of barrier dysfunction, also known as "leaky gut," occurring before the onset of the disease. The researchers also identified specific bacteria that appear to be significantly different in people who develop the disease compared to those who do not.

The work of the GEM Project, under the leadership of Croitoru, has significantly advanced the understanding of Crohn's disease and has the potential to improve prevention and treatment strategies.

== Awards and recognition ==
Croitoru is a Tier 1 Canada Research Chair in Inflammatory bowel diseases.
