= Ouida Ramón-Moliner =

Irish-born Canadian anaesthetist (1929–2020)

- Born: Ouida d'Abreu; 23 December 1929; Waterford, Ireland
- Died: 21 February 2020 (aged 90); North Hatley, Quebec, Canada
- Education: Trinity College Dublin; Royal Victoria Hospital
- Occupation: Anaesthetist
- Spouse: Enrique Ramón-Moliner
- Children: 4

Ouida Ramón-Moliner (née d'Abreu; 23 December 1929 – 21 February 2020) was an Irish-born Canadian anaesthetist. She began working at Montreal General Hospital, helping Wilder Penfield perform awake craniotomies and the anaemia cure pioneer Harold Griffith. Ramón-Moliner also worked at Georgetown University Hospital in Washington, D.C, Université Laval and the Faculty of Medicine and Health Sciences at the Université de Sherbrooke. She received the Quebec Lieutenant Governor's Seniors Medal in 2012 and a scholarship issued by Champlain Regional College is named after her.

== Early life and education ==
On 23 December 1929, Ramón-Moliner was born in Waterford in Ireland. She was named after Maria Louise Ramé, the English author whose pen name was Ouida. Ramón-Moliner was one of five children of Indian immigrants from Mangalore to Ireland. She was inspired from an early age to be similar to a woman anaesthetist who was working with her father and she wanted to give birth to four offspring, two boys and two girls. Ramón-Moliner studied medicine at Trinity College Dublin, but she did not go to her intended destination of New Zealand. Rather, she remained in Montreal after meeting her husband Enrique Ramòn-Moliner in 1956. In Montreal, she finished her post-graduate training at the Royal Victoria Hospital.

== Career ==
She emigrated to Canada in 1956, and began her career at Montreal General Hospital and helped Wilder Penfield to perform awake crainotomies keeping patients awake to locate where exactly there were suffering from epilepsy. Ramón-Moliner prepared for awake craintonmies by constructing a small tent for her and the patient to talk directly with each other and using a light would show the patient a stack of word-picture cards. She also worked with the anaemia cure pioneer Harold Griffith. Ramón-Moliner went on to work at Georgetown University Hospital in Washington, D.C., and participated in the first mechanical surgeries for mechanical hear-valves. When First Lady Jacqueline Kennedy gave birth to John F. Kennedy Jr., she was the anaesthetist on call, and requested the head of department to do the delivery.

Ramón-Moliner was then appointed the first woman anaesthetist at Université Laval, and later joined the teaching staff of the Faculty of Medicine and Health Sciences (CHUS) at the Université de Sherbrooke in 1967. She worked in Sherbrooke until 1995. Ramón-Moliner did not make any official retirement following her no longer practising medicine. She served on CHUS' user committee, and assisted in the establishment of the Massawippi Water Protection group, of which she served as president. Ramón-Moliner assisted in her friends in getting around the medical system such as driving them to appointments. She earned the Quebec Lieutenant Governor's Seniors Medal in 2012.

== Personal life ==
She was married to the Spanish-born neuroscientist Enrique Ramón-Moliner. There were four children from the marriage. Ramón-Moliner was diagnosed with aggressive pancreatic cancer and died at her home in North Hatley, Quebec, on 21 February 2020. She was given a non-religious informal remembrance service in front of more than 200 individuals at the Unitarian Universalist Church eight days later.

== Character and legacy ==
Her children described her as "often the first woman among men. Ouida would respond with her trademark shrug to any suggestions that, as a woman, she might have been treated unfairly at work" and that she "was pragmatic and objective." Ramón-Moliner helped to pioneer environmentalism and was inclined to reduce, reuse and recycle before the practice became common. The $1200 Ouida Ramon-Moliner Scholarship for Science issued by Champlain Regional College was named after her. A male or female student citizen of Canada is eligible for the scholarship and it is awarded "to a graduate of a science program at Champlain College Lennoxville Campus, from the Eastern Townships who intends to pursue further scientific studies."
