= Joseph Morley Drake =

Joseph Morley Drake (1828-1886) was a British doctor and educator.

Drake studied chemistry at the London Polytechnic Institute, and graduated as an analytical chemist in 1845. That same year, he migrated to Canada, where he worked as a pharmacist. Deciding to retrain in medicine, he studied at McGill University Faculty of Medicine, graduating with honours in 1861 and finding immediate employment as House Surgeon at Montreal General Hospital. He became a Professor of Clinical Medicine at his alma mater in 1868, and was appointed Chair of Physiology there four years later. Resigning in 1874 due to heart trouble, Drake was appointed Emeritus Professor of Medicine, and after his death in 1886 his heirs established the Joseph Morley Drake Chair of Physiology in his honour. Thomas Wesley Mills became the first Drake Professor of Physiology when the position was created in 1897.
