= David S Rosenblatt =

Canadian medical geneticist and pediatrician

David S. Rosenblatt
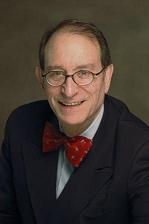
- Education: Faculty of Medicine at McGill University (doctorate 1970),
- Known for: Inborn errors of folate and vitamin B_{12} metabolism
- Scientific career
- Fields: Medical genetics, pediatrics
- Institutions: McGill University; Montreal Children's Hospital; Massachusetts General Hospital; Massachusetts Institute of Technology; Boston Children's Hospital
- Academic advisors: John Littlefield; Richard Erbe; Malcolm Gefter

David Rosenblatt is a Canadian medical geneticist, pediatrician, and professor in the departments of Human Genetics, Medicine, Pediatrics, and Biology at McGill University in Montreal, Quebec, where he was the chairman of the Department of Human Genetics from 2001 to 2013. He is known for his contributions to the field of inborn errors of folate and vitamin B_{12} metabolism.

== Education ==
Rosenblatt received a Bachelor of Science from McGill University in 1968 and a doctorate in medicine from the Faculty of Medicine at McGill University in 1970. After completing an internship in pediatrics at the Montreal Children's Hospital (1970–1971), he pursued postgraduate training in medical genetics and folate metabolism at the Massachusetts General Hospital under the supervision of John Littlefield and Richard Erbe (1971–1973), and in biology at the Massachusetts Institute of Technology under Malcolm Gefter (1973–1974), finishing with a residency in pediatric medicine at the Boston Children's Hospital (1974–1975).

== Career ==
Rosenblatt was first appointed in the Department of Pediatrics at McGill in 1975 and was the chairman of the Department of Human Genetics from 2001 to 2013. He holds the Dodd Q. Chu and Family Chair in Medical Genetics.

He is actively involved in research and patient care, as well as graduate and medical student teaching. He has acted as supervisor and mentor to more than 35 graduate students and post-doctoral fellows. He has authored over 200 publications in peer-reviewed journals.

In 1995, he was made a Correspondent étranger of the Académie Nationale de Médecine (France), and in 2005, he was elected as a Fellow of the Canadian Academy of Health Sciences. In 2013, he was named a Champion of Genetics by the Canadian Gene Cure Foundation. He has served as President of the Society for Inherited Metabolic Disorders, the Canadian Society for Clinical Investigation, and the Association of Medical Geneticists of Quebec.
