= Balter, Guth, Aloni & Co. =

Israeli law firm

Balter, Guth, Aloni & Co. Law Offices
- Type: Partnership (Israel)
- Industry: Law
- Founded: Tel Aviv, Israel (1974)
- Headquarters: Tel Aviv, Israel, Jerusalem, Israel, Haifa, Israel, Tiberias, Israel and Beer Sheva, Israel
- Key people: Senior Partners Moshe Balter, Ehud Guth, Shaul Aloni and Meir Rosenne
- Products: Legal advice
- Revenue: Unknown
- Number of employees: 144
- Website: www.bgalaw.co.il

Balter, Guth, Aloni & Co. ("BGA") is an Israeli law firm. The firm has offices in Tel Aviv, Jerusalem, Haifa, Tiberias and Beer Sheva. BGA is a member of Consulegis, an international network of law firms. It holds a cooperation agreement with the U.S law firm of Herzfeld & Rubin. Its insurance practice is ranked in the second tier of Israeli firms by The Legal 500.

== History ==
Balter, Guth, Aloni & Co. was founded in 1974 by Moshe Balter and Ehud Guth.

In December 2019 the firm carried out the first merger in its 46-year history, absorbing the Tel Aviv firm NTK (Naman, Kinan), which brought twelve lawyers and practices in mergers and acquisitions, international law, capital markets, commercial real estate, hospitality and competition law. The merged firm had about 100 lawyers in five offices, in Tel Aviv, Jerusalem, Haifa, Tiberias and Kiryat Shmona, and was led by managing partner Eyal Bar Eliezer.

In March 2020 BGA merged in part of the practice of Granot & Co., specialising in insolvency and the realisation of assets; the incoming team was headed by Shai Granot together with the partners Doron Dutan and Yehuda Ilok.

In February 2026 Shlomo "Momi" Lamberger, who had served as Deputy State Attorney for Criminal Affairs from 2017 to 2025, joined the firm as a partner and head of its regulation and white-collar crime practice.
