= Le Dain Commission of Inquiry into the Non-Medical Use of Drugs =

Canadian government commission

The Commission of Inquiry into the Non-Medical Use of Drugs, often referred to as the Le Dain Commission after its chair Dean Gerald Le Dain, was a Canadian government commission that was begun in 1969 and completed its work in 1972.

The recommendations of Gerald Le Dain, Heinz Lehmann and J. Peter Stein included legalization of the simple possession of cannabis and cultivation for personal use. Marie-Andrée Bertrand, writing for a minority view, recommended a policy of legal distribution of cannabis, that it be removed from the Narcotic Control Act (since replaced by the Controlled Drugs and Substances Act) and that the provinces implement controls on possession and cultivation, similar to those governing the use of alcohol. The fifth commissioner, Ian L. Campbell, recommended a policy of ticketing for smoking in public.

The report also recommended that the federal government conduct further research to monitor and evaluate changes in the extent and patterns of the use of cannabis and other drugs, and to explore possible consequences to health, and personal and social behaviour, resulting from the controlled legal distribution of cannabis.

A total of 365 submissions were presented at the hearings and an additional 50 were forwarded to the commission's office. About 12,000 people attended and participated in these hearings, which included testimony from a number of prominent individuals including John Lennon on 22 December 1969 in Montreal, Quebec.

Although the report was widely praised for its thoroughness and thoughtfulness, its conclusions were largely ignored by the Trudeau federal government. Pierre Trudeau's son, Justin Trudeau, became Prime Minister of Canada 45 years later, and the younger Trudeau completed the process to legalize cannabis in Canada in 2017. Until legislation was enacted, marijuana remained illegal (except with a physician's prescription for medical purposes). He insisted that police "enforce the law": criminally charge illegal storefront dispensaries. Trudeau also explained that the intent of the legislation was not to encourage recreational use of cannabis. The intent is "to better protect our kids from the easy access they have right now to marijuana [and] to remove the criminal elements that were profiting from marijuana," he told the Toronto Star on 2 December 2016. On June 20, 2018, the federal government announced that possession of marijuana (cannabis) would no longer be illegal in Canada effective October 17, 2018, almost 50 years since the establishment of the Le Dain Commission
