= Morag Park =

Cancer researcher

Morag Park CQ FRSC is a Scottish-Canadian breast cancer and genomics researcher at the McGill University Health Centre. She was the director of the Rosalind and Morris Goodman Cancer Institute (GCI) for 12 years. Park is known for her work on the combination of genetic and epigenetic alterations that result in breast cancer progression and receptor tyrosine kinases involved in cancer. More recently, she has worked in as primary co-researcher of a Quebec cancer biobank network that creates tumor models derived from patients, allowing for research into why individual patients respond well or poorly to cancer therapies. She is currently a professor in the Gerald Bronfman Department of Oncology and a member of the McGill University Faculty of Medicine and Health Sciences.

== Education ==
Park conducted her undergraduate studies at University of Glasgow and received a B.Sc. with first class honors. She received a PhD in viral carcinogenesis at the Medical Research Council Virology Institute in Scotland and conducted her post-doctoral research at the National Institutes for Cancer Research in Washington, DC.

== Awards and honors ==
2022 Woman of Distinction Award in Research and Innovation

Club de Recherches Cliniques du Québec Michel Sarrazin Award (2021)

Quebec Breast Cancer Foundation Grand Prix Scientifique (2019)

Canadian Cancer Society 2017 Robert L. Noble Prize

2015 Canadian Cancer Research Alliance Award for Exceptional Leadership in Cancer Research
