= Enid Johnson Macleod =

Canadian medical researcher

Enid Johnson Macleod (1909 – 17 May 2001) was a Canadian anaesthetist and medical doctor.

== Biography ==
Gladys Enid Johnson was born in Jacksonville, New Brunswick, Canada, 1909. She spent much of her early life in Nova Scotia. She graduated from Dalhousie Medical School in 1937.

At the urging of Harold Griffith, she became a specialist anaesthetist. Together they pioneered the use of curare as a muscle relaxant, the first occasion being in support of an appendectomy operation on 23 January 1942 at Montreal Homeopathic Hospital.

She married lawyer Innis Gordon Macleod in 1942, then practised in Sydney, Nova Scotia for six years. She joined Dalhousie University Faculty of Medicine in 1960 and retired in 1978 as emeritus professor. She was an active member of the Federation of Medical Women of Canada and its president from 1969 to 1970.

Macleod died 17 May 2001. The Enid Johnson Macleod Award, awarded annually to a physician or non-physician for promotion of women's health research and/or women's health education, is named for her.

== Selected works ==
- Petticoat Doctors: The First Forty Years in Dalhousie University (Pottersfield Press, 1990, 2001)
