= Terence Coderre =

Canadian scientist

Terence J. Coderre
- Education: McGill University
- Occupations: Professor, Researcher

Terence J. Coderre is Professor of Medicine and the Harold Griffith Chair in Anaesthesia Research at McGill University in Montreal, Quebec, Canada. He is an investigator at the Alan Edwards Centre for Research on Pain at McGill University and the McGill University Health Centre Research Institute in Brain Repair and Integrative Neuroscience (BRaIN) Program.

== Biography ==
He obtained a Doctor of Philosophy (Ph.D.) in Psychology, specializing in behavioural neuroscience from McGill University in 1985. He subsequently completed post-doctoral training first in neuro-anatomy at University College London and then in neuroscience at the University of California, San Francisco.

In 1990, he joined the Institut de recherches cliniques de Montréal as Director of the Pain Mechanisms Laboratory. He then joined McGill University in 2000.

He is a member of the Integrative Program in Neuroscience, and an associate member of the Departments of Psychology and Neurology & Neurosurgery and the Division of Experimental Medicine at McGill University.

He became the Harold Griffith Chair in Anaesthesia Research at McGill University in May 2013.

He is a former executive member of the Canadian Pain Society.

He is Director of the Anesthesia Research Unit and Director of Pain Research Laboratories in the Anesthesia Research Unit and at the McGill University Health Centre Research Institute.

== Research ==
His research mostly focuses on the mechanisms underlying neuroplasticity and its influence on the perception of pain.

== Honours ==
He has been awarded the Early Career Investigator Award from the Canadian Pain Society, as well as the Patrick D. Wall Young Investigator Award from the International Association for the Study of Pain.

== Internal link ==
- Harold Griffith
