= Perry Rosenthal =

American eye surgeon and academic

Perry Rosenthal (September 2, 1933 - March 3, 2018) was a Canadian-born American eye surgeon and professor of ophthalmology, known for his work in the development of the first gas-permeable scleral contact lens.

== Education ==
Following his graduation from McGill University Medical School in May 1958, Rosenthal completed his internship at Montreal General Hospital in 1959. From 1959 until April 1960, he completed a basic science course in ophthalmology at Harvard Medical School, Boston, Massachusetts. He was a resident in ophthalmology at the Massachusetts Eye and Ear Infirmary from 1960 to 1963, then joined the infirmary staff. From 1963 to 1998, he was in private practice, and a staff surgeon at the Massachusetts Eye and Ear Infirmary. He was then named to the infirmary's courtesy staff, and, since 2013, was an emeritus member. Rosenthal was a part-time Assistant Clinical Professor in Ophthalmology at Harvard Medical School since 1984.

== Academic work ==
As a resident at Massachusetts Eye and Ear Infirmary, Rosenthal founded the hospital's contact lens clinic. He subsequently became a co-founder of Polymer Technology Inc., which developed Boston Lens products, including a rigid gas-permeable plastic that allowed the corneas to breathe normally through the contact lenses. The firm was subsequently acquired by Bausch & Lomb, of which Rosenthal became a director. In 1986, he developed a practical, gas-permeable scleral contact lens to treat and restore vision of eyes with many corneal diseases, which ave been widely adopted in clinical practice, He has also published on oculofacial pain, and dry-eye disease.

In 1992, he created the non-profit Boston Foundation for Sight to provide these devices to those in need, regardless of their ability to pay. He remained president until 2012. In 2013, he founded the non-profit Boston EyePain Foundation, in Chestnut Hill, Massachusetts.

== Honors and awards ==
- 1987 – Trailblazer's Award, Contact Lens Manufacturers Association (CLMA)
- 1994 – Joseph Dallos Award (CLMA), "outstanding contribution to the development and advancement of the contact lens industry in memory of the Hungarian-born British ophthalmologist Josef Dallos, a pioneer in the development of the first contact lenses.
- 2002 – Tech Laureate, by the Tech Museum of Innovation, San Jose, California, for technology benefiting humanity.
- 2007 – Founders Award: American Academy of Optometry
- 2012 – Dr. Donald R. Korb Award for Excellence, annual meeting of the American Optometric Association

== Publications ==
His most cited publications are:

- Romero-Rangel, T., Stavrou, P., Cotter, J., Rosenthal, P., Foster, S. "Gas permeable scleral lens therapy in ocular surface disease." American Journal of Ophthalmology, 2000; 130: 25–32. Cited 153 times, according to Google Scholar.
- Rosenthal, P., Cotter, J.M, Baum, J. "Treatment of persistent epithelial defect with extended wear of a fluid-ventilated gas permeable scleral contact lens." American Journal of Ophthalmology, 2000; 130: 33-41 Cited 98 times, according to GoogleScholar. Online
- Rosenthal, P., Croteau, A. "Fluid-Ventilated, gas-permeable scleral contact lens is an effective option for managing severe ocular surface disease and many corneal disorders that would otherwise require penetrating keratoplasty." Eye & Contact Lens, 2005; 31 (3) (130-134).
