= LASIK MD =

Medical service provider in laser vision correction

LASIK MD is a North American provider of laser vision correction and the largest provider of laser vision correction in North America based on procedure volume. As of 2013, LASIK MD performs over sixty percent of all laser vision correction procedures in Canada.

LASIK MD was founded in 2001 by Mark Cohen and Avi Wallerstein with two initial clinics in Montreal, Quebec, Canada and Toronto, Ontario, Canada. As of 2025, there are 34 LASIK MD eye centres located across Canada. The clinics serve all major metropolitan areas throughout Canada. LASIK MD is a provider of vision correction procedures, performing LASIK, PRK, presbyopia and keratoconus treatments. The LASIK MD centre in Montreal is the largest private eye care centre in the province of Quebec and also performs cataract surgeries.

The LASIK MD Montreal location is a LASIK training centre for Canadian laser eye surgeons. It is a non-hospital based facility accredited by the College of Physicians of Quebec for the training of laser vision correction to ophthalmic surgery residents. This accreditation was obtained via the University of Sherbrooke.

== History ==
Wallerstein was the National Medical Director of LASIK Vision Corporation and oversaw medical standardization. By 2000, Lasik Vision Corporation, a publicly traded corporation, became the largest laser vision company in the world, as measured by procedure volume.

However, soon after its bankruptcy in 2001, Cohen and Wallerstein left LASIK Vision to implement a similar medical model in a group of privately owned facilities. These centres operate under the name LASIK MD. LASIK MD subsequently acquired the majority of the former Lasik Vision facilities in bankruptcy proceedings in Canada.

== Awards ==
In 2013, LASIK MD earned Platinum Club status in Canada's Best Managed Companies competition sponsored by Deloitte, CIBC, the National Post and Queen's School of Business. LASIK MD was presented with a Special National Citation in honour of Service Excellence at the Ernst & Young 2008 Entrepreneur of the Year Awards. LASIK MD has been voted as a Consumer Choice Award Canada winner in the Laser Vision Correction category for every year since 2008, including the 2025 awards for the Greater Toronto Area, Ottawa, and Barrie. It has also been honored in the Stars of Vancouver awards.
