= Anne Monique Nuyt =

Canadian paediatrician

- Education: Université de Sherbrooke
- Scientific career
- Workplaces: Université de Montréal; Collège de France; Iowa State University; McGill University

Anne Monique Nuyt is a Canadian paediatrician who is Professor of Neonatology and Canada Research Chair in Prematurity and Developmental Origins of Cardiovascular Health and Diseases at the Université de Montréal. Her research considers how perinatal oxidative stress can alter the structural development and function of the cardiovascular system.

== Early life and education ==
Nuyt trained in medicine at the Université de Sherbrooke. After earning her medical degree, she completed her residency in Sherbrooke, before moving to McGill University for a fellowship in perinatal and neonatal medicine. In 1993, Nuyt joined Iowa State University, where she focused on perinatal cardiovascular physiology. She continued investigating cardiovascular science, supported by the Canadian Institutes of Health Research, at the Collège de France.

== Research and career ==
Nuyt investigates how oxidative stress after birth impacts the structural development and function of cardiovascular systems. Alongside other ante- and neo-natal factors, these stresses can alter the onset of hypertension in adulthood. Her laboratory performs investigations by studying animal models. She has shown that it is possible to modify a rat's diet and trigger delayed growth in their offspring as well as hypertension in adulthood. Similarly, she has shown that if rats are exposed to high oxygen concentrations in the first days of their lives they experience vascular dysfunction and hypertension. Nuyt is interested in how the mechanisms that underpin the development of hypertension. To evaluate other factors, Nuyt performs clinical trials in mother-child cohorts. She is particularly interested in the development of screening strategies and targeted therapies.

Nuyt has demonstrated that babies born very prematurely (extreme preemies) are considerably more likely to suffer from high blood pressure as adults. She also showed that women who are born prematurely are more like to have their own babies prematurely.

During the COVID-19 pandemic, Canada experienced a surge in the number of young people with eating disorders and suicidal thoughts. Nuyt called for the prioritisation of adolescent mental health to limit the long-term consequences of the pandemic on young people. She was elected to the Canadian Academy of Health Sciences in 2021.

== Awards and honours ==
- 2013 Fonds de la Recherche en Santé du Québec Senior Scholar Award
- 2016 Hypertension Canada Certificate of Excellence
- 2021 Elected Fellow of the Canadian Academy of Health Sciences
- 2022 Canada Research Chair

== Selected publications ==
- Anne Monique Nuyt (1 January 2008). "Mechanisms underlying developmental programming of elevated blood pressure and vascular dysfunction: evidence from human studies and experimental animal models". Clinical Science. 114 (1): 1–17. doi:10.1042/cs20070113. ISSN 0143-5221. PMID 18047465. Wikidata Q37019112.
- Anne Monique Nuyt; Barbara T Alexander (1 March 2009). "Developmental programming and hypertension". Current Opinion in Nephrology and Hypertension. 18 (2): 144–152. doi:10.1097/mnh.0b013e328326092c. ISSN 1062-4821. PMC 2782679. PMID 19434052. Wikidata Q37435871.
- Gilles Cambonie; Blandine Comte; Catherine Yzydorczyk; et al. (30 November 2006). "Antenatal antioxidant prevents adult hypertension, vascular dysfunction, and microvascular rarefaction associated with in utero exposure to a low-protein diet". American Journal of Physiology - Regulatory, Integrative and Comparative Physiology. 292 (3): R1236-45. doi:10.1152/ajpregu.00227.2006. ISSN 0363-6119. PMID 17138729. Wikidata Q52000397.
