= Mark Cohen (surgeon) =

Canadian laser eye surgeon

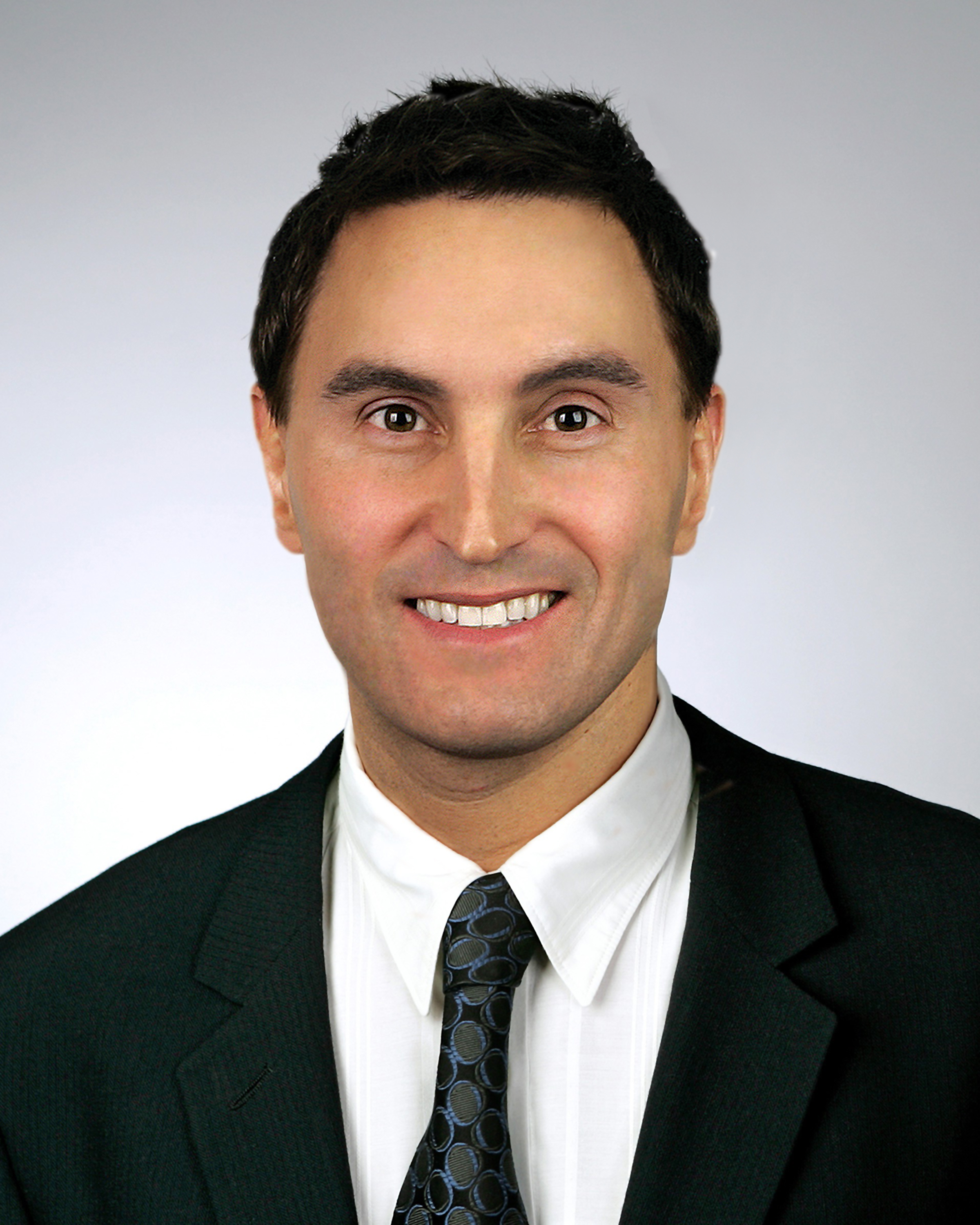

Mark Cohen is a Canadian laser eye surgeon who practices in Montreal and Toronto. He is CEO and Co-Founder of Vision Group. In 2001, he and Avi Wallerstein founded LASIK MD, Canada's largest provider of laser refractive surgery. In 2010 LASIK MD performed over sixty percent of all laser vision correction procedures in Canada.

== Education ==
Cohen completed his medical degree (MD, CM) in 1992 with a specialization in ophthalmology (FRCSC) at McGill University. At McGill, he was a recipient of the Holmes Gold Medal, awarded to the graduate with the highest aggregate academic standing upon completion of medical school. Following residency, he completed his training with a post-doctoral fellowship in corneal transplantation surgery and laser vision correction of the cornea at the Université de Montréal. He previously attended Vanier College in Montreal.

Cohen is clinical instructor and lecturer in refractive surgery at McGill University and the Université de Sherbrooke. This facility is a non-hospital based facility accredited site by the College of Physicians of Quebec for the training of laser vision correction to ophthalmic surgery residents.

== Career ==
Cohen is a certified C-LASIK instructor, Cohen was a clinical assessor for Bausch and Lomb for the zero compression Hansatome microkeratome, designed to allow for safer and thinner corneal flaps for LASIK surgery. He is one of two National Medical Directors for LASIK MD (2001–present).

Cohen served as president and CEO of LASIK MD since its inception. In 2017, the company merged with TLC Laser Eye Centres to form Vision Group, a network of laser vision correction and ophthalmology clinics across North America. Following the merger, Cohen became president, CEO, co-founder, and co-national medical director of Vision Group.

In 2016, concurrent with an investment by the Caisse de Dépôt (CDPQ) in LASIK MD, a board of directors was created and Cohen was named the chairman.

== Awards ==
In 2024, Cohen was named one of the EY Entrepreneur Of The Year 2024 Québec Award Winner. In 2007, Cohen was awarded the Bank of Montreal Arista award organized by the Young Chamber of Commerce of Montreal as Quebec's leading Young Professional for the year. In 2006, he received the Howard Stotland Technology Award for Young Technology Entrepreneur of the Year. In 2008, Cohen was named one of Canada's Top 40 Under 40. He is a Quebec recipient of the Ernst & Young 2008 Entrepreneur of the Year Award in the professional/financial services category and received a National Citation in honour of Service Excellence.
