= Richard Margolese =

Canadian scientist (born 1935)

- Born: 30 July 1935 (age 91)
- Education: Medical Degree
- Alma mater: Westmount High School; Dartmouth College; McGill University Faculty of Medicine
- Occupation: scientist

Richard Margolese, MD, CM FRCS (C), (born 30 July 1935) is a Canadian scientist and has been a leader of multiple research studies that have changed the standard treatment for early-stage breast cancer. He is a native of Montreal, Canada.

He was a principal investigator and member of the Executive Committee of the National Surgical Adjuvant Breast Project, which, in a series of studies demonstrated the effectiveness of lumpectomy, in combination with radiation therapy, chemotherapy, and/or hormonal therapy, over radical mastectomy as an effective treatment for many breast cancer patients. He is a past President of the National Cancer Institute of Canada, was National Director of the Canadian Cancer Society and was awarded the Order of Canada as one of Canada's premier oncologists.

Margolese also authored studies which compared the effectiveness of treatment options demonstrating their benefits over previous options.

== Education ==
Margolese attended Westmount High School, in Westmount, Quebec. He then earned an AB at Dartmouth College in Hanover, NH. He returned to Montreal to complete his medical degree at the McGill University Faculty of Medicine.

== Career ==
Margolese has been a professor at McGill University where he has held the Herbert Black Chair in Surgical Oncology. and was the original director of the department of Surgical Oncology at McGill University's Jewish General Hospital.

He has contributed to several medical reference books and journals. Early in his career, he authored a low-fat cookbook "A Doctor's Eat Heart-y Guide for Good Health and Long Life."

== Honours ==
- The Order of Canada in 1997
- The O. Harold Warwick Prize in 1994
- The R.M. Taylor Medal and Award from the Canadian Cancer Society in 2000
- The Distinguished Lifetime Achievement Award of the National Surgical Breast and Bowel Project in 2006
- 45th Annual André Aisenstadt Memorial Clinical Day held in honor of Richard Margolese
