= Avi Wallerstein =

Canadian ophthalmologist and laser eye surgeon

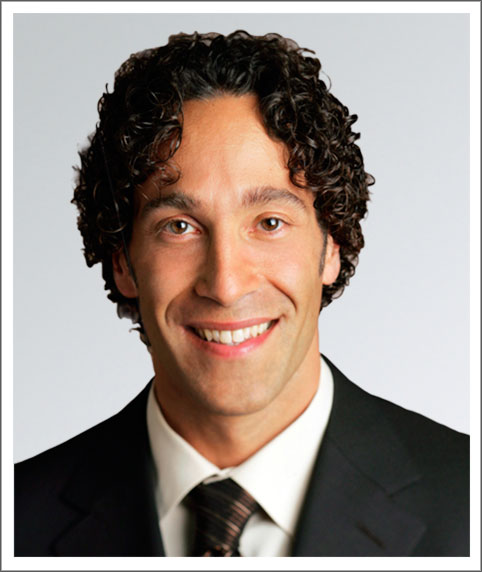

Avi Wallerstein is a Canadian ophthalmologist and laser eye surgeon who specializes in surgical vision correction, also termed refractive eye surgery. He practises in Montreal and Toronto. In 2001, he co-founded Lasik MD with Mark Cohen. Lasik MD is Canada's largest provider of laser refractive surgery, performing over 60,000 procedures a year. He is one of 14 certified CLasik instructors in North America.

== Education ==
Wallerstein studied physiology at McGill University in Montreal, Quebec and completed his Doctor of Medicine degree (MD) at Queen's University in Kingston, Ontario, Canada. He then specialized in ophthalmology (FCRSC) at McGill University in Montreal where he received his Royal College of Canada certification. He went on to complete his post-doctoral fellowship training in corneal transplantation, cataract surgery and laser refractive surgery from Cornell, North Shore University Hospital and New York University, in New York City, USA. Wallerstein is a fellow of the Royal College of Physicians and Surgeons of Canada (FRCSC) and is a member of the American, European and International Societies of Refractive Surgery as well as the American Academy of Ophthalmology.

== Career ==
Wallerstein was the LASIK specialist at Focus Eye Centre in Ottawa and Montreal's Ophthalmolaser Clinic. During this time, Wallerstein was the first Montreal surgeon to introduce the vertical flap technique with a scanning spot laser, a method that was ultimately adopted as the standard of care in laser refractive surgeries across North America. He later assumed the role of International Medical Director at LASIK Vision Corporation. There, he oversaw medical protocol in 28 clinics with 58 surgeons across North America, and became the co-chairman of their medical advisory committee and sat on the board of directors for LASIK Vision Corporation.

Wallerstein has clinical experience and has conducted over 60,000 laser ocular surgery procedures. He has devoted the last eighteen years of his career to laser refractive care, focusing his medical practice exclusively on laser vision correction. He performs complex corneal collagen and cross-linking (CXL) procedures for keratoconus patients, combined with excimer laser and topography-guided treatments for challenging corneas.

In 2001, Wallerstein founded Lasik MD with Mark Cohen, and sits as the company's executive vice-president. He is one of two of the company's national medical directors. Wallerstein heads the research & development department. He has developed and implemented the only commercial multi-clinic electronic medical records software solely specialized for laser vision correction. He has also worked as the principal investigator with pharmaceutical companies and manufacturers on multi-centre clinic trials in laser vision correction. He has more than 90 peer-reviewed, published and presented scientific abstracts to his credit. Wallerstein teaches residents and ophthalmologists-in-training in his role as director of optics and refractive surgery teaching at McGill University and is an assistant professor of ophthalmology and attending staff at the McGill University Health Centre (MUHC). Additionally, he has trained over 200 Canadian ophthalmologists in laser refractive surgery.

In 2015, Wallerstein and Cohen launched a new laser vision procedure called Laser PresbyVision™, a corneal-based treatment designed to correct blurred near vision and reduce patients' need for reading glasses, a condition known as presbyopia.

== Awards ==
In 2006, he and Cohen both received the Howard Stotland Technology Award for Young Entrepreneur of the Year. Wallerstein is a Quebec recipient of the Ernst and Young 2008 Entrepreneur of the Year Award in the Professional/Financial Services category and received a National Citation in honour of Service Excellence. Wallerstein has also spoken at schools and colleges, discussing his professional and educational experiences.

In 2014, under Wallerstein's and Cohen's direction, LASIK MD earned Platinum Club status in the Canada's Best Managed Companies program, sponsored by Deloitte, CIBC, the National Post and the Stephen J. R Smith School of Business at Queen's University.

The website RateMDs.com lists Wallerstein as the top ophthalmologist in Montreal, out of 307.

== Media interviews ==
Wallerstein has been interviewed by several media outlets and has been featured on Discovery Health Channel's Medical Hotseat. CTV News Canada AM, the Business News Network, and EyeWorld Video reporter. Furthermore, LASIK MD has been featured in a number of publications, including the Montreal Gazette, the Globe & Mail, the National Post and more.
