= Thomas A. Ban =

Hungarian born Canadian psychiatrist (1929–2022)

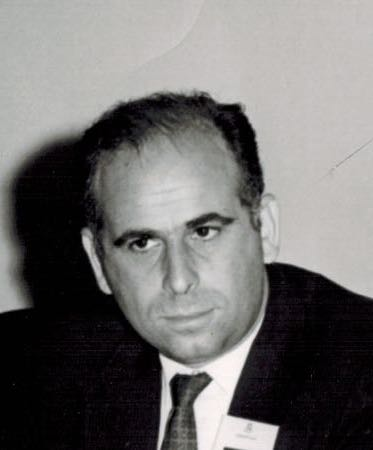
- Ban, circa 1962
- Born: Thomas Arthur Ban; November 16, 1929; Budapest, Hungary
- Died: February 4, 2022 (aged 92)
- Education: Semmelweis Medical University; McGill University
- Occupations: Psychiatrist psychopharmacologist
- Known for: First textbook: Psychopharmacology (Williams and Wilkins, 1969)
- Awards: Canadian Psychiatric Association; McNeil Award; 1969, 1970, 1973 Clarke Institute of Psychiatry; Annual Research Fund Award; 1970 State of New York Office of Mental Health; Heinz E. Lehmann Research Award for Outstanding Contribution to Research; 1996 ACNP; Paul Hoch Distinguished Service Award; 2003
- Scientific career
- Fields: Psychopharmacology
- Workplaces: McGill University; Vanderbilt University

Thomas A. Ban (November 16, 1929 – February 4, 2022) was a Hungarian-born Canadian psychiatrist, psychopharmacologist, academic, researcher and theorist.

He was author of more than 60 books and more than 800 scientific papers.

== Career ==
Due to the Hungarian uprising he emigrated to Canada and served as a rotating intern in 1957–58 at the Victoria General Hospital in Halifax, and as a resident psychiatrist in Montreal under Heinz Lehmann at the Verdun Protestant Hospital in 1958–59, and under Donald Ewen Cameron at the Allan Memorial Institute in 1959–60. In 1960 Tom joined the staff at VPH as Senior Psychiatrist and Chief of the Clinical Research Service. He received his Diploma in Psychiatry from McGill University in 1960 with a thesis on “Conditioning and Psychiatry”, published in 1964.

In 1969, he published the first textbook in the emerging field, Psychopharmacology. It covered the history and development of this new discipline and described therapeutic techniques and the limitations and advantages of the many drugs then available. For this contribution, Ban was awarded the Clarke Institute of Psychiatry Annual Research Fund Award in 1970.

In 1971 at McGill University in Montreal, Quebec, he was the founding director of the first Division of Psychopharmacology in a Department of Psychiatry in the world. It slowly affiliated with the various psychiatric hospital units connected to McGill with the goals of practice, teaching and research. One of the foci for the Division was to develop a new vocabulary for the description of patients which “speaks the same language used to describe the drugs”. This classification or drug-patient portrait would describe the effects of certain drugs in relation to characteristic mental conditions responsive to these agents.

Ban was a critic of psychiatric practice, accusing the discipline of lacking a coordinated body of knowledge. Beginning in the 1960s, he was at the vanguard for a biologically based psychiatry at odds with the then dominant Freudian psychoanalytic approach to treatment. As he concluded from the impact of drugs: “Today we have all the means necessary to practice psychiatry on medical grounds. We can approach schizophrenia and treat the manic depressive and those with mood swings."

The classification of mental illness was a lifelong pursuit. He was inspired by the German psychiatrist Karl Leonhard and became an honorary member of the International Wernicke-Kleist-Leonard Society. He found their distinctive classification more precise than the American Psychiatric Association’s Diagnostic and Statistical Manual of Mental Disorders (DSM).

He received the first annual Canadian Psychiatric Association’s McNeil Award in 1969. He won the award again in 1970 and 1973.

He was on the boards of two Hungarian neuropsychiatric journals, in addition to journals in Argentina, Brazil, Italy and the United States.

== Early life and education ==
Thomas Arthur Ban was born on November 16, 1929, in Budapest, Hungary. In 1954 he graduated from the Medical School in Budapest, which was formerly and currently known as Semmelweis University and then became Resident Psychiatrist at the National Institute of Psychiatry and Neurology from 1954 to 1956. It was here he had his first exposure to the effectiveness of some of the new psychotropic drugs of the time like chlorpromazine (CPZ) and lithium. In 2019 he gave an eyewitness account of this development on an episode of BBC Witness, "The first anti-psychotic drug".

Ban received his Diploma in Psychiatry with Distinction from McGill University, Montreal in 1960. His thesis Conditioning and Psychiatry was published in 1964 with a foreword by W. Horsley Gantt, at the time one of the last living pupils of physiologist Ivan Pavlov. It went on to receive an Honorary Mention in the 1965 Quebec Literary and Scientific Competition.

In 1960 Ban joined the staff at VPH as Senior Psychiatrist and Chief of the Clinical Research Service. His abilities were quickly noted; by 1961 Ban became the co-principal investigator with Heinz Lehmann in the Early Clinical Drug Evaluation Unit (ECDEU), a clinical drug evaluation program sponsored by the US Public Health Service, which met to exchange observations and findings on new psychotropics. As one of the first units in the network, they were involved in the systematic study of most of the psychotropic drugs marketed in North America during the 1960s and 70s. This led to the development of a methodology acceptable to both the drug companies and drug regulatory agencies for demonstrating their therapeutic efficacy. Many side effects were observed and described, some for the very first time. Over an 18-year period their output of ideas and research was documented in 211 articles and shared at conferences. This vital fresh knowledge had an immeasurable impact on psychiatrists worldwide.

This work led to his becoming the inaugural director of McGill's Division of Psychopharmacology in 1971, and consequently his appointment in 1972 as the Director of the World Health Organization (WHO) Training Program in Biological Psychiatry.

== Full professor ==
In 1976 he became a full professor of psychiatry at Vanderbilt University in Nashville, Tennessee and director of the clinical research division of the Tennessee Neuropsychiatric Institute, a research facility on the grounds of an old state hospital.

In the mid-1980s he recognized that none of the newer drugs were better in their therapeutic efficacy than the original breakthroughs such as chlorpromazine for schizophrenia or imipramine for depression. Even by the late 1960s he was certain that a decision must be reached about whether there is a particular population which responds to a particular drug. If such a population exists, how does one identify it? In response he wrote The Prolegomenon to the Clinical Prerequisite: Psychopharmacology and the Classification of Mental Disorders (1987) which was summarized in the foreword by C. Raduoco-Thomas: “In contrast to some of the recently proposed classifications, which are based on the consensus of experts, Ban’s classification is based on the historical development of diagnostic concepts. Similarly, and in contradistinction to some of the recent “atheoretical” classifications, Ban’s “composite system” is based on the theory that each psychiatric illness unfolds in its “dynamic totality” (from onset to outcome) within a structure determined by the disease.”

== Mid-career ==
In 1995 Vanderbilt University appointed him professor of psychiatry, emeritus. In his remaining years he passionately devoted himself to the history of neuropsychopharmacology, including co-editing with Edward Shorter and David Healy a four-volume autobiographical account series for the Collegium Internationale Neuro-Psychopharmacologicum (CINP), and as editor-in-chief of a ten-volume oral history psychopharmacology series for the American College of Neuropsychopharmacology (ACNP). He was a founder and the first executive editor of The International Network for the History of Neuropsychopharmacology (INHN) website from its inception in 2013 until his death. It came about from discussions with several editors involved in previous efforts to document the history of the discipline. As he clearly articulated: “It is difficult for me to see how research could contribute to the development of a field if it is not done in a historical context.”

== Late honors and death ==
He was honoured with the State of New York Office of Mental Health Heinz E. Lehmann Research Award for Outstanding Contributions to Research in 1996. In 2003 he was bestowed with the Paul Hoch Distinguished Service Award of the American College of Neuropsychopharmacology.

He died following a massive stroke on February 4, 2022, at age 92.
