= David Goltzman =

Canadian endocrinologist, Professor

David Goltzman OC FRSC FRCPC
- Education: McGill University
- Occupations: Physician; Professor; Researcher

David Goltzman is a Canadian endocrinologist, Professor of Medicine and Physiology, and A.G. Massabki Chair in Medicine at McGill University in Montreal, Quebec. He has been the Director of the Centre for Bone and Periodontal Research and also holds the position of Senior Scientist at the McGill University Health Centre Research Institute in the Metabolic Disorders and Complications Program.

== Biography ==
He obtained a Bachelor of Science in biochemistry from McGill University in 1966, followed by a Doctor of Medicine from that same institution in 1968, graduating as the Holmes Gold Medalist. He obtained clinical training as a resident in Internal Medicine at Columbia University in New York, and clinical and research training in Endocrinology at Mass General Hospital in Boston.

He has been actively registered as a member of the Collège des médecins du Québec since 1968 in the specialty of endocrinology and metabolism. He obtained his Royal College of Physicians and Surgeons of Canada fellowship certification in Internal Medicine in March 1974.

He joined McGill University as assistant professor in 1975. From 1978 to 1983, he was associate professor in the Department of Medicine. and became full professor. in 1983. He then joined the Department of Physiology, and served as Chair of the Department of Physiology from 1988 to 1993. From 1994 to 2004, he was Chair of the Department of Medicine. He was also Physician-in-Chief at the Royal Victoria Hospital from 1994 to 1998 and of the McGill University Health Centre from 1998 to 2004.

In June 1994 he was named the A.G. Massabki Chair in Medicine at McGill University.

He has been Director of the Centre for Advanced Bone and Periodontal Research, as well as Director of the Calcium Research Laboratory, and from 2004 lead the Canadian Multicentre Osteoporosis Study(CaMos).

== Research ==
His research mostly focuses on the hormonal regulation of mineral and skeletal homeostasis, including the function of parathyroid hormone, parathyroid hormone-related protein, and vitamin D. He has also made major contributions to our understanding of osteoporosis. and other metabolic bone diseases.

== Publications and scholarly activities ==
He has published over 400 scholarly articles and has delivered numerous prestigious lectureships including the John T Haddad Memorial Lecture of the University of Pennsylvania, Division of Endocrinology in 2004, the Distinguished Lecturer in Nutritional Sciences, Columbia University College of Physicians and Surgeons, New York in 2005, the 1st Samuel York Lecture, Dalhousie Medical School, Halifax, Nova Scotia in 2008, the Gerald D Aurbach Lecture of the US Endocrine Society in 2009, the Wood lecturer, University of Calgary, Calgary, Alberta, and the David Hawkins lecture, Memorial University, Newfoundland in 2012, and the Henry Friesen Award and Lecture of the Canadian Society for Clinical Investigation and the Royal College of Physicians and Surgeons of Canada in 2017. He presided over many scientific societies and was President of the American Society for Bone and Mineral Research in 1999-2000. He has also trained numerous students, residents and fellows.

== Honours and awards ==
His contributions have been recognized by election to the American Society for Clinical Investigation in 1981, and election as a fellow of both the Royal Society of Canada in 1995 and the Canadian Academy of Health Sciences. in 2005. He was named an officer of the Order of Canada in 2000 and received the Queen Elizabeth II Golden Jubilee Medal in 2002. He has also received an Honorary Professorship from Nanjing Medical University, as well as a Doctor Honoris Causa from the University of Athens. He received the Lawrence G. Raisz Award (inaugural) of the American Society for Bone and Mineral Research (ASBMR) in 2010, the Gold Medal of the Hellenic Physiological Society (Greece) and the Lindy Fraser Memorial Award of Osteoporosis Canada in 2012, the CP Leblond Award of the Réseau de recherche en santé buccodentaire et osseuse of the Fonds de recherche du Quebec in 2014. In 2022 he became a Fellow of the ASBMR (“in recognition of distinguished accomplishments and contributions to bone and mineral science, to the musculoskeletal field, and to the ASBMR”).
