= Gabriella Gobbi =

Neuroscientist and psychiatrist exploring effects of cannabis use

Gabriella Gobbi is an Italo-Canadian psychiatrist and neuroscientist whose research explores novel treatments for mental health disorders. Gobbi is a professor at McGill University's Department of Psychiatry and a Canada Research Chair (Tier 1) in Therapeutics for Mental Health.

== Research career ==
In 1991, Gobbi completed a Doctor of Medicine degree, and specialized in Psychiatry and Psychotherapy (1995) at the Catholic University of Rome in Italy and later obtained a PhD in neuroscience under the supervision of Gianluigi Gessa.

== Scientific contributions ==
=== Psychedelics for anxiety ===
Gobbi's research has shown that regular administration of low doses of LSD (lysergic acid diethylamide) reduces anxiety, through mechanisms similar commonly prescribed classes of antidepressants and selective serotonin reuptake inhibitors (SSRIs), and that LSD signaling also activates the mTOR signalling pathway.

=== Cannabis and association with depression in adolescence ===
Dr. Gobbi's lab discovered that adolescent cannabis consumption induces depression-like behavior in animals. Upon finding that there is a link between depression and long-term cannabis consumption in young people, Gobbi engaged widely with stakeholders and the media, ultimately resulting in a change in the legal age of cannabis consumption in Quebec from 18 to 21, and her receiving the 2020 Principal's Prize for Public Engagement through Media (Established Academics category) from McGill University.

=== Melatonin MT2 receptor agonists for pain and insomnia ===
Even if melatonin was isolated more than 60 years ago, the roles of GPCR melatonin receptors (named MT1 and MT2) remained unknown. Her lab discovered that the MT1 and MT2 receptors have very specialized functions: while the MT1 activates REM sleep, the MT2 receptor acts on NREM sleep. Her lab also synthesized and developed novel selective MT2 receptors partial agonists for the treatment of insomnia and neuropathic pain.

== Honors and awards ==
Dr Gobbi is a fellow of the American College of Neuropsychopharmacology and President-elect of the International College of Neuropsychopharmacology

- 2022 Canadian College of Neuropsychopharmacology (CCNP), Innovation in Neuropsychopharmacology
- 2022 International College of Neuropsychopharmacology (CINP) - Sumimoto/Sunovion Brain Health Basic Research Award
- 2020 McGill Principal's prize for public engagement through media
- 2017 Dr. Samarthji Lal award for Mental Health Research, Graham Boeckh Foundation
- 2015 Premio Venezia - Italian Chamber of Commerce in Canada
- 2014 American College Neuropsychopharmacology (ACNP), Associate Member
- 2013 Gold Medal for Merit- City of Osimo (An), Italy
- 2012 Canadian College of Neuropsychopharmacology (CCNP), Award for a young investigator
- 2007 Canadian Psychiatric Research Foundation (CPRF), Award for a young investigator
- 2006 Canadian Psychiatric Research Foundation (CPRF), Award for a young investigator
- 1998 Award for young researcher, World Federation of Societies of Biological Psychiatry
- 1998 Recipient of the Wyeth-Ayerst Canada Fellowship
- 1996 Award for research in Adolescent Psychiatry and Psychotherapy, Pio Sodalizio dei Piceni

== Selected academic publications ==
- Gobbi, G., Bambico, F. R., Mangieri, R., Bortolato, M., Campolongo, P., Solinas, M., ... & Piomelli, D. (2005). Antidepressant-like activity and modulation of brain monoaminergic transmission by blockade of anandamide hydrolysis. Proceedings of the National Academy of Sciences, 102(51), 18620-18625.
- Gobbi, G., Atkin, T., Zytynski, T., Wang, S., Askari, S., Boruff, J., ... & Mayo, N. (2019). Association of cannabis use in adolescence and risk of depression, anxiety, and suicidality in young adulthood: a systematic review and meta-analysis. JAMA psychiatry, 76(4), 426-434.
- Comai, S., & Gobbi, G. (2014). CCNP Award Paper: Unveiling the role of melatonin MT2 receptors in sleep, anxiety and other neuropsychiatric diseases: a novel target in psychopharmacology. Journal of Psychiatry and Neuroscience, 39(1), 6-21.
- Posa, Luca, Danilo De Gregorio, Gabriella Gobbi, and Stefano Comai. "Targeting melatonin MT2 receptors: a novel pharmacological avenue for inflammatory and neuropathic pain." Current medicinal chemistry 25, no. 32 (2018): 3866-3882.
- Lopez-Canul, M., Palazzo, E., Dominguez-Lopez, S., Luongo, L., Lacoste, B., Comai, S., ... & Gobbi, G. (2015). Selective melatonin MT2 receptor ligands relieve neuropathic pain through modulation of brainstem descending antinociceptive pathways. Pain, 156(2), 305-317.
- De Gregorio, D., Popic, J., Enns, J. P., Inserra, A., Skalecka, A., Markopoulos, A., ... & Gobbi, G. (2021). Lysergic acid diethylamide (LSD) promotes social behavior through mTORC1 in the excitatory neurotransmission. Proceedings of the National Academy of Sciences, 118(5), e2020705118.
- De Gregorio, D., Inserra, A., Enns, J. P., Markopoulos, A., Pileggi, M., El Rahimy, Y., ... & Gobbi, G. (2022). Repeated lysergic acid diethylamide (LSD) reverses stress-induced anxiety-like behavior, cortical synaptogenesis deficits and serotonergic neurotransmission decline. Neuropsychopharmacology, 47(6), 1188-1198.
- Aguilar-Valles, A., De Gregorio, D., Matta-Camacho, E., Eslamizade, M. J., Khlaifia, A., Skaleka, A., ... & Sonenberg, N. (2021). Antidepressant actions of ketamine engage cell-specific translation via eIF4E. Nature, 590(7845), 315-319.
