= Beverley Pearson Murphy =

Canadian endocrinologist and professor (1929–2020)

- Born: March 15, 1929; Toronto, Ontario, Canada
- Died: April 27, 2020 (aged 91); Montreal, Quebec, Canada
- Education: University of Toronto; McGill University
- Known for: Clinical chemistry; Endocrinology
- Spouse: David Raymond Murphy
- Children: 2
- Awards: Fellow of the American College of Physicians (1977); Fellow of the Royal Society of Canada (1989)
- Scientific career
- Workplaces: McGill University

Beverley E. Pearson Murphy, MD, FRSC (1929 – 2020) was a Canadian endocrinologist and professor emeritus at McGill University.

Born in Toronto, she earned a B.A. in science from the University of Toronto in 1952, followed by an M.D. in 1956. She earned a master's degree in experimental medicine at McGill University in 1960, completing her residency at the Royal Victoria Hospital, and was awarded a PhD in Investigative Medicine from McGill in 1964.

In the 1950s, she discovered new methods for measuring steroid hormones such as cortisol. This work continued to be cited for decades.

She taught at McGill from 1964, and later was senior obstetrician and gynecologist at Montreal General Hospital, where she also served as director of the Reproductive Physiology Unit from 1972 to 1994.

She developed a standard method for the measurement of thyroxine, a technique which was in use for many years. Her paper on this topic was one of the 100 most-cited papers in 1980, making her one of the few women scientists routinely being cited at the time.

She was elected to the American Society for Clinical Investigation in 1969. She was elected as a Fellow of the Royal Society of Canada in 1989. She was the recipient of the Distinguished Service Award from the Canadian Society of Endocrinology and Metabolism and the Distinguished Investigator Award from the National Alliance for Research on Schizophrenia and Depression.

== Selected works ==
- Pattee, Chauncey J.; Engelberg, William; Murphy, Beverley Pearson (1 March 1963). "Simple Method for the Determination of Plasma Corticoids". The Journal of Clinical Endocrinology & Metabolism. 23 (3): 293–300.
- Murphy, Beverley Pearson (1 July 1965). "The determination of thyroxine by competitive protein-binding analysis employing an anion-exchange resin and radiothyroxine". The Journal of Laboratory and Clinical Medicine. 66 (1): 161–167.
- Murphy, Beverley E. Pearson (1 July 1967). "Some Studies of the Protein-Binding of Steroids and Their Application to the Routine Micro and Ultramicro Measurement of Various Steroids in Body Fluids by Competitive Protein-Binding Radioassay". The Journal of Clinical Endocrinology & Metabolism. 27 (7): 973–990.
- Diez D'aux, Robert C.; Pearson Murphy, Beverley E. (1 November 1972). "Steroid Levels in the Human Fetus: Cortisol and Cortisone". The Journal of Clinical Endocrinology & Metabolism. 35 (5): 678–683.
- Pearson Murphy, B. E., Dhar, V., Ghadirian, A. M., Chouinard, G., & Keller, R. (1991). Response to steroid suppression in major depression resistant to antidepressant therapy. Journal of Clinical Psychopharmacology, 11(2), 121–126.
- Allison, Cyndie M.; Hu, Fen-Yun; Steinberg, Susanne I.; Pearson Murphy, Beverley E. (1 December 2001). "Neuroactive Ring A-Reduced Metabolites of Progesterone in Human Plasma during Pregnancy: Elevated Levels of 5α-Dihydroprogesterone in Depressed Patients during the Latter Half of Pregnancy". The Journal of Clinical Endocrinology & Metabolism. 86 (12): 5981–5987.
