= Sig Anderman =

American businessman, attorney and philanthropist

- Born: Sigmund Anderman; 1941 (age 84–85); New York City, New York, U.S.
- Education: City College of New York (BS); New York University (LLB)
- Occupations: Businessman, attorney, and philanthropist

Sigmund "Sig" Anderman (born 1941) is an American businessman, attorney, and philanthropist.

== Education ==
Anderman was born in New York City in 1941 and attended New York public schools, graduating from City College of New York with a B.S. in education in 1962. He earned a Bachelor of Laws degree from New York University in 1965.

== Career ==
After graduating, Anderman worked for the law firm of Winer, Neuburger and Sive (now Sive, Paget and Reisel), a New York law firm specializing in corporate and environmental law. For many years, he along with partner, David Sive, was part of the legal team handling lawsuits that defined the environmental movement in America.

Anderman's wrote several books and articles relating to entrepreneurship, including The Eight Patterns of Highly Effective Entrepreneurs by New York Times writer Brent Bowers, Small Business Growth Strategies, and Leadership Plans for CEOs: Top CEOs on Building a Team, Achieving Goals and Delivering Value by Aspatore, and Tom Peters’ Re-Imagine!: Business Excellence in a Disruptive Age, and the 2005 Tom Peters’ PBS Special on Business Excellence and Innovation.
