= Andermann syndrome =

- Other names: KCC3 axonopathy, agenesis of corpus callosum with neuronopathy, Charlevoix disease
- This condition is inherited in an autosomal recessive manner.
- Specialty: Medical genetics, neurology

Andermann syndrome, also known as agenesis of corpus callosum with neuronopathy (ACCPN), Charlevoix disease and KCC3 axonopathy among other names, is a very rare neurodegenerative genetic disorder that damages the nerves used to control muscles and related to sensation and is often associated with agenesis of the corpus callosum.

It was first described in 1972 by Frederick and Eva Andermann et al.

== Symptoms and signs ==
Symptoms and signs involve both the central and peripheral nervous systems starting in infancy:

- hypotonia
- areflexia
- amyotrophy
- variable degrees of dysgenesis of the corpus callosum
- mild to severe intellectual and developmental delay
- psychiatric problems including paranoid delusions, depression, hallucinations and autistic-like behavior

== Genetics ==
The inheritance pattern is autosomal recessive and involves nonsense and missense mutations of the SLC12A6 gene which codes for an axonal cell membrane protein of the same name, that functions as a co-transporter of potassium ions and chloride ions. The normal presence of these channels in axons of both the central nervous system and peripheral nervous system accounts for the symptoms and signs arising from brain and nerves.

The disease has been modelled in transgenic mice. Dogs show a different phenotype from humans, with predominantly spinocerebellar ataxia.

== Neuropathology ==
Autopsy examination of eight cases has shown both developmental and degenerative neuropathologic features in this disease, consistent with clinical duality as both a neurodevelopmental and neurodegenerative disorder.

In the central nervous system, accompanying the hypotonia at birth is hypoplasia of the corticospinal tracts. Another developmental feature is seen in the corpus callosum, which varies from absent to hypoplastic. The anterior commissure is almost always absent, but occasionally hypoplastic. A bundle of Probst can be found running anteroposterior rather than crossing the midline. The axonal damage due to the channel deficiency can cause a reactive axonal overgrowth leading to small, tumor-like growths, or tumorlets, called axonomas, or balls of aberrant axons attempting regrowth. Damaged axons can also show a sign of inhibition of axonal transport, forming axonal spheroids. These spheroids can occur throughout the cerebral hemispheres, explaining the psychotic symptoms by disconnection of the brain from itself by axonal functional disruption.

In the peripheral nervous system (PNS), the disease is more severe. While most nervous system diseases affect either central nervous system (CNS) or PNS, this disease affects both, but the changes in the PNS lead to death. This occurs by axonal disease paralyzing the skeletal muscles, including the respiratory muscles, as a result of axonal damage in peripheral nerves. Changes in the axons are more severe in the PNS than CNS, and under the electron microscope, some axons look necrotic, by virtue of containing mitochondrial flocculent densities and other irreversible changes. The lack of innervation of the body musculature during development gives rise to small body weights, often below 40 kg (88 lb), remarkable in view of the preserved brain weights.

== Diagnosis ==
A typical diagnostic workup includes:

- Clinical features
- Electrophysiologic testing
- Molecular genetic testing (SLC12A6)
- Magnetic resonance imaging of the brain (revealing in 60% of the patients callosal agenesis and in 10% partial callosal agenesis)

== Treatment ==
Currently, no cure is known, but some symptoms may be treated, such as neuroleptics for the psychiatric problems.

== Prognosis ==
The prognosis is poor. Patients usually begin using wheelchairs by their 20s and die by their 30s.

== Prevalence ==
The prevalence rate has been estimated to be less than one per 1,000,000 worldwide, and is much more common in the French-Canadian population of the Saguenay and Lac-St-Jean regions of Quebec, Canada, where it has a frequency of about one in 2100 in live births, and a carrier rate of one in 23. This genetic disease, along with the SLC12A6 mutation, has also been described in Turkey, Algeria, Tanzania, Bulgaria and Norway.
