= Halter (surname) =

Halter is a surname. Notable people with the surname include:

- Bill Halter, Lieutenant Governor of Arkansas
- Ed Halter, film programmer, writer, and founder of Light Industry
- Lars Halter, German-American journalist and currently General Chairman of the Steuben Parade
- Marek Halter, French novelist
- Paul Halter, French novelist
- Shane Halter, American baseball player
- Sydney Halter, Canadian lawyer and the first commissioner of the Canadian Football League
