= David Paige Smith =

American educator

David Paige Smith (October 1, 1830 – December 26, 1880) was a professor at Yale Medical School and is the namesake of the David Paige Smith professorship at the school.

Smith, eldest son of James M. Smith, M. D., and grandson of Nathan Smith, M.D., the first Professor of Theory and Practice in the Yale Medical Institution, was born in Westfield, Mass, October 1, 1830. His father moved to Baltimore, Md., in 1838, and returned to Springfield, Mass., about 1841, from which place the son entered Yale College, where he graduated in 1851.

Smith studied medicine in the Jefferson Medical College, Philadelphia, and also with his father, who was killed in the railroad disaster at Norwalk, Conn., in 1853. Upon graduation at Philadelphia, in March, 1854, he succeeded to his father's practice in Springfield. The sane year married Eunice S. Brewer. In 1860 he went to Europe and spent a year in medical and surgical study. On his return he entered the Union Army as Surgeon of the 18th Massachusetts Infantry, but was soon made Medical Director of General George H. Thomas' division. After the Peninsula campaign, he was placed in charge of the hospital at Fairfax Seminary, near Alexandria, Virginia, and while there rendered most valuable and conspicuous service, and laid the foundation for his subsequent eminence and success in difficult surgical operations.

After resuming practice in Springfield at the close of the American Civil War, he rapidly advanced in professional standing, and when in 1873 he was elected to the chair originally held by his grandfather in the Yale Medical School, he was the acknowledged head of his profession in the region of his residence. In 1877 he was transferred to the more congenial chair of surgery, and his services were of great value to the school, though he continued to reside in Springfield until his death. His laborious practice and the intense energy with which he gave himself to it, had unfitted him for resisting disease, and death resulted from a chill contracted in a drive to a neighboring town and neglected until too late. He died in Springfield, December 26, 1880, at the age of 50 years. His wife survived him. Their only child, a son, died in 1873. By his will his professional library and his valuable collections of medical and surgical instruments were given to Yale College, and the proceeds of two-fifths of his estate were used for the endowment of the chair of the Theory and Practice of Medicine.
