= Meyer Balter =

Canadian physician

Meyer Balter FRCPC
- Born: December 26, 1954 (age 71); Montreal, Quebec
- Education: McGill University Faculty of Medicine
- Occupation: Physician
- Known for: Expert on COPD
- Scientific career
- Fields: Pulmonology
- Workplaces: University of Toronto

Meyer Stanley Balter (born December 26, 1954) is a Canadian physician specializing in asthma, sarcoidosis and chronic obstructive pulmonary disease (COPD).

He earned an M.D. from McGill University Faculty of Medicine (1981). He became a Fellow of the Royal College of Physicians and Surgeons of Canada in 1989. He currently is Director, Asthma Education Clinic and Director, Internal Medicine Residency Training Program at Mount Sinai Hospital (Toronto), and Professor of Medicine, University of Toronto.

== Clinical activities ==
- Asthma (Education Clinic at Mount Sinai Hospital, co-author of Canadian Guidelines)
- COPD (principal author, Canadian AECB Guidelines, co-author of Canadian COPD Guidelines)
- Sarcoidosis Clinic

== Current local, provincial, national and international activities ==
- CTS COPD Guidelines Committee
- CTS Canadian Respiratory Guidelines Committee (CRGC)
- CTS Honorary Lecture 2024 CHEST Conference
