= Consulegis =

CONSULEGIS
- Website: http://www.consulegis.com/

CONSULEGIS is an international network of independent law firms, in-house lawyers and related professional advisors.

== Operations ==
The principal objective of CONSULEGIS is to provide its members with legal resources for their clients throughout the world, with a particular emphasis on professionalism, mutual trust and reliability, i.e., to arm its members, whose clients have commercial and litigation requirements extending beyond their own borders, with the ability to refer clients to known and trusted colleagues in all corners of the commercial world. A basic principle of CONSULEGIS, emphasizing independence and integrity, is that it is not exclusive as its members are at liberty to refer their clients to any law firm that might best serve the needs of its clients, whether within or outside the network. CONSULEGIS seeks to attract and include members in most cities across the world that it considers to be of strategic, commercial and economic importance in an effort to allow each firm to enhance its legal footprint based on personal international resources. English is the official language. Member firms, which are initially admitted on the basis of quality, reputation, size and volume of international work, as a basic tenet, have no formal association with each of the other member firms, i.e., each is independent, thus giving each firm access to firms all over the world to assist with its clients’ legal matters with little likelihood that there will be a conflict of interest. CONSULEGIS maintains its headquarters in Munich, Germany, with a Managing Director and staff responsible for coordination among firms, semi-annual conferences, member development and processing of applicants, marketing and all administrative activities.

== History ==
The network started with approximately a dozen local members and now includes members in more than 45 countries and 150 cities globally. CONSULEGIS was established in 1990 in Hamburg, Germany, as a European Economic Interest Group (EEIG), to enable lawyers in Germany to have access, through network colleagues, to the courts in other cities at a time when lawyers could not themselves practice outside their own jurisdictions. CONSULEGIS has since expanded into all of Western, Central and Eastern Europe, Scandinavia, the United Kingdom, North and South America, Australia, Asia, Japan, the Pacific Rim, the Middle East and Africa.
