= Alice Benjamin =

Canadian physician

Alice Benjamin OC OQ (born 9 September 1945, Piravom, India) is a Canadian specialist in fetal and maternal medicine.

== Education ==
She earned a Bachelor of Science degree from the University of Kerala (1964) and a doctorate in medicine from the University of Delhi (1971). She completed her internship at the Lady Harding Medical College Hospital in New Delhi in 1970-71 and completed her residency in ob/gyn at McGill University at the Jewish General Hospital and the Royal Victoria Hospital in Montreal including fellowship in maternal-fetal medicine in 1978.

== Career and research ==
Benjamin holds a certificate in obstetrics and gynecology from the Royal College of Physicians and Surgeons of Canada (1977) and a certificate from the College of Physicians and Surgeons of Quebec. She became a Fellow of the American College of Obstetrics and Gynecology in 1981.

A consultant with Prince Edward County Memorial Hospital in Ontario from 1978 to 1979, Benjamin joined the Department of Gynecology and Obstetrics at the Royal Victoria Hospital in Montreal in 1979. She belongs to the perinatal unit and is associate professor at McGill University. Benjamin established and became director of the Royal Victoria Hospital's Antenatal Day Center in 1979. She focuses on high-risk pregnancies and works with a multidisciplinary team that supports treatment that avoids hospitalization, so that patients can remain with their families - a first in North America.

Benjamin was one of four specialists who sued McGill University Health Centre over medical quotas.

Benjamin pursues many philanthropic endeavours including supporting children through the World Vision child sponsorship programme, and The Salvation Army.

== Awards and honours ==
- Knight of the National Order of Quebec (January 1993).
- Distinguished Indo-Canadian award (October 2000).
- Alice Benjamin Award for Excellence in Obstetrics established by the Alexander family and awarded to McGill University residents yearly.
- Molson Award for Educational Excellence created in honour of Dr. Benjamin and awarded to McGill residents yearly.
- Dr. Alice Benjamin Leadership Award established by Chaya and Lorne Lieberman to recognize leadership in the Department of Obstetrics and Gynecology's residency program.
- Dr. Alice Benjamin Global Maternal and Child Health Awards established in 2018 in honour of Dr. Benjamin by friends, family, and patients whose lives she touched throughout her career. Provides support to students or trainees undertaking electives or research projects overseas in under-resourced areas of the world.
- Officer of the Order of Canada (November 2020).
