= RateMDs.com =

Healthcare provider review website

- Founded: 2004
- Founder: John Swapceinski
- Industry: Doctor ratings and reviews
- Services: Healthcare provider and medical facility search service
- Parent: VerticalScope Inc.
- Website: http://www.ratemds.com

RateMDs.com is a free website allowing users to submit and read reviews of doctors, dentists, psychologists, urgent care centers, group practices, hospitals and other healthcare facilities. Founded in 2004, it has gained popularity as a platform for patients to research and share their experiences about healthcare providers.

The site is free to use for both consumers and doctors.

== History ==
RateMDs.com was founded in 2004 by John Swapceinski in San Jose, California. The site was acquired by VerticalScope Inc. in 2014. The site has been featured in numerous publications, including The Wall Street Journal and BuzzFeed.

== Business model ==
The site generates revenues through two means:

- Online advertising
- Paid Plans for healthcare providers and clinics. Buying a subscription is optional, and includes:
  - Profile enhancements like photo galleries and appointment request forms
  - Advertising within RateMDs.com
  - Rating Concierge

RateMDs.com initially offered paid plans where healthcare providers could pay to manage their online reputation, including the ability to hide or suppress negative reviews. However, in August 2019, RateMDs.com announced a significant policy change, removing the “Rating Manager” feature from its promoted plans. This change effectively ended the practice of healthcare providers being able to pay to hide ratings

RateMDs does not work with reputation management or rating removal companies.

== Criticism & Controversies ==
While RateMDs has become a valuable resource for patients seeking information about new or existing healthcare providers, the website has faced criticism and controversy in the past.

RateMDs allows users to rate doctors anonymously. As a result, some doctors have expressed concerns about the accuracy and fairness of the ratings system, claiming that it is susceptible to manipulation and does not adequately represent the quality of care provided. Additionally, there have been instances of fake reviews and defamation on the site, leading to questions about the reliability of the information available.

RateMDs.com has also faced criticism for its earlier practice of allowing healthcare providers to pay to suppress negative ratings through the Rating Manager feature. However, with the removal of this feature in August 2019, the platform has taken steps to address concerns about the fairness and transparency of its rating system.

== Formal complaints ==
On 30 June 2020 a complaint against RateMDs by a dentist in British Columbia, Canada was upheld by the Office of the Privacy Commission of Canada. The OPC commented in their ruling that:

"Requiring health professionals to pay in order to remove reviews, and then requiring continued monthly payments to maintain their suppression, is a clear example of an inappropriate ‘pay-for-takedown’ practice, in contravention of subsection 5(3). RateMDs initially disagreed with our Office’s position but ultimately agreed to implement our Office’s recommendation to cease offering this service. In August 2019, RateMDs replaced its Ratings Manager service plan with a new plan called ‘Ratings Concierge’. This service eliminates the ability of subscribers to hide any reviews from the website."

On 23 September 2020 an award of $50,000 damages and $16,000 costs to an Ontario physician was upheld by the Court of Appeal for Ontario. The physician sued the brother of a patient he had treated, together with RateMDs, for derogatory comments which the patient's brother had posted on the RateMDs website. The action against RateMDs was discontinued, although it is not clear on what basis.

== Corporate structure ==
VerticalScope Inc. is the parent company of RateMDs, after its acquisition in 2014.

== Legal position ==
RateMDs is incorporated in the USA. The RateMDs website states:

"The Communications Decency Act (the “CDA”) is a complete bar to our liability for the statements of others on this website: "No provider or user of an interactive computer service shall be treated as the publisher or speaker of any information provided by another information content provider." 47 U.S.C. § 230 ... The United States has enacted strict laws protecting US companies from lawsuits brought in foreign jurisdictions. Even if you win a judgment under your local laws, it will not be enforceable in the United States. See, e.g. SPEECH Act of 2010."

Individual users can, however, be sued, as in the examples above, particularly if they are based in a non-USA jurisdiction. A large proportion of RateMDs users are Canadian.
