= Heinz Lehmann =

Canadian psychiatrist (1911–1999)

Heinz Edgar Lehmann
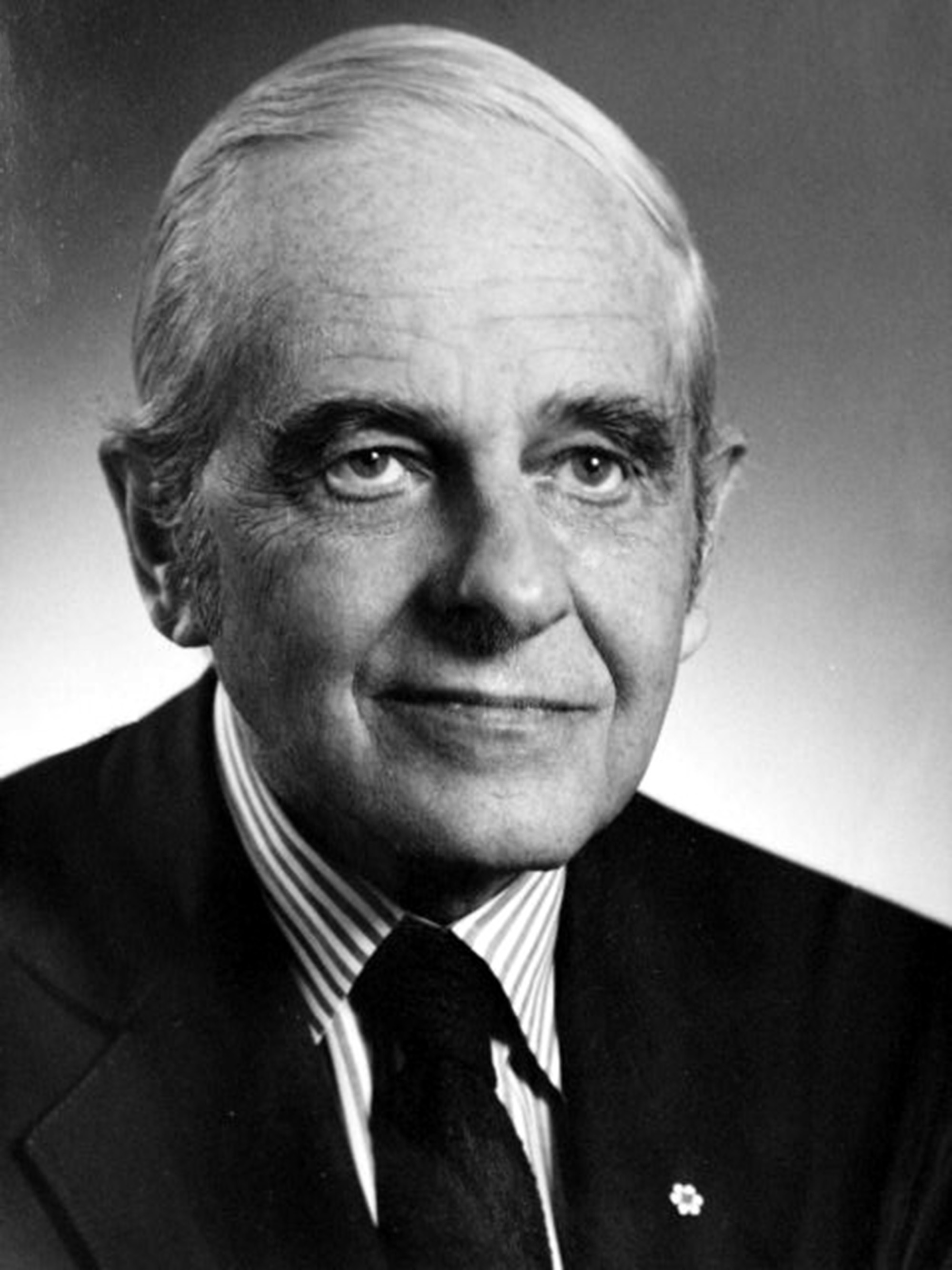
- Born: July 17, 1911; Berlin, German Empire
- Died: April 7, 1999 (aged 87)
- Awards: Lasker Award, Order of Canada
- Scientific career
- Fields: psychiatrist
- Workplaces: McGill University

Heinz Edgar Lehmann OC FRSC (July 17, 1911 – April 7, 1999) was a German-born Canadian psychiatrist best known for his use of chlorpromazine for the treatment of schizophrenia in 1950s and "truly the father of modern psychopharmacology."

== Early life ==
Born in Berlin, Germany, he was educated at the University of Freiburg, the University of Marburg, the University of Vienna, and the University of Berlin. He emigrated to Canada in 1937.

He worked at the Montreal Children's Hospital, where he improved his English. He was appointed junior psychiatrist at then Verdun Protestant Hospital, now called Douglas Mental Health University Institute, on the eve of the Second World War. He lived on the grounds of this hospital where he met his future wife Annette, a nurse, and their son François was born in 1944.

== Hospital work in Canada ==
In 1947, he was appointed the clinical director of Montreal's Douglas Hospital. From 1971 to 1975, he was the chair of the McGill University Department of Psychiatry. He was also a humane lecturer in psychiatry in 1952, giving empathetic lectures on topics like anxiety, depression, obsessions, and paranoia. When chlorpromazine (Largactil) arrived from France in 1953 and imipramine (Tofranil) arrived from Switzerland in 1958, Lehmann helped promote them in North America, which ignited the drug revolution. He was also an early supporter of research on the use of psilocybin to alleviate anxiety.

== Early Clinical Drug Evaluation Unit (ECDEU) ==
In 1961, Dr. Lehmann became involved in a new US Public Health Service Program initiative which met to exchange observations and findings on new psychotropics. Although based in Montreal, Canada, it became one of the first units in this network. He invited Thomas A. Ban, his senior psychiatrist and chief of the clinical research service at the hospital, to become his co-principal investigator. This began a close collaboration over an 18-year period that researched most of the psychotropic drugs marketed in North America during the 1960s and 70s. Their findings and observations were shared internationally in articles and at conferences and had a profound impact on the evolution of psychopharmacology as a discipline.

== Le Dain Commission ==
From 1969 to 1972, he was one of the five members of the Le Dain Commission, a royal commission appointed in Canada to study the non-medical use of drugs. He was an advocate for decriminalization of marijuana.

== DSM work ==
In 1973, he was a member of the Nomenclature Committee of the American Psychiatric Association that decided to drop homosexuality from the Diagnostic and Statistical Manual of Mental Disorders, i.e. to depathologize it.

== Honors and awards ==
In acknowledgment of his important contributions, he received the Lasker Award in 1957 and the Stratton Award of the American Psychopathological Association in 1962. In 1970 he was made a Fellow of the Royal Society of Canada and, in 1976, he was made an Officer of the Order of Canada. He was inducted into the Canadian Medical Hall of Fame in 1998.

== Heinz Lehmann Award ==
In 1999, the Canadian College of Neuropsychopharmacology established the Heinz Lehmann Award in his honor, given in recognition of outstanding contributions to research in neuropsychopharmacology in Canada. There are also several other awards including the Heinz Lehmann Award of Excellence of the Quebec Psychiatric Association; and the Heinz E. Lehmann Research Award, which was established by the New York State Office of Mental Health.
