= T. Wesley Mills =

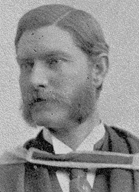
T. Wesley Mills

Thomas Wesley Mills (1847–1915), generally referred to as T. Wesley Mills in the scientific literature, was a Canadian physician and physiologist who worked as a professor at McGill University. Mills was Canada's first professional physiologist. He authored books and research articles on comparative physiology, animal behavior, and the physiology of voice production.

After graduating from the University of Toronto and teaching high school for two years, Mills began medical studies at McGill in 1876 and graduated with high honors in 1878. Mills was a close associate of William Osler, who influenced the direction of his career and introduced him to an international network of biomedical researchers. Mills traveled to London, where he worked with John Scott Burdon-Sanderson and Edward Albert Schafer, Baltimore where he worked with H. Newell Martin at Johns Hopkins University, Strasbourg with Felix Hoppe-Seyler and Friedrich Goltz, and Berlin with Hugo Kronecker.

Mills began teaching physiology at McGill in 1884, eventually becoming the first Joseph Morley Drake Chair professor of physiology in 1891. He founded the Society for the Study of Comparative Physiology in 1885, was elected to the Royal Society of Canada in 1890, and became president of the Natural History Society of Montreal in 1894.

== Selected publications ==
- A Text-Book of Animal Physiology (1889)
- The Nature and Development of Animal Intelligence (1898)
- Voice Production in Singing and Speaking, Based on Scientific Principles (1913)
