= Frederick Andermann =

Canadian neurologist and epileptologist (1930–2019)

Frederick Andermann OC OQ FRCPC
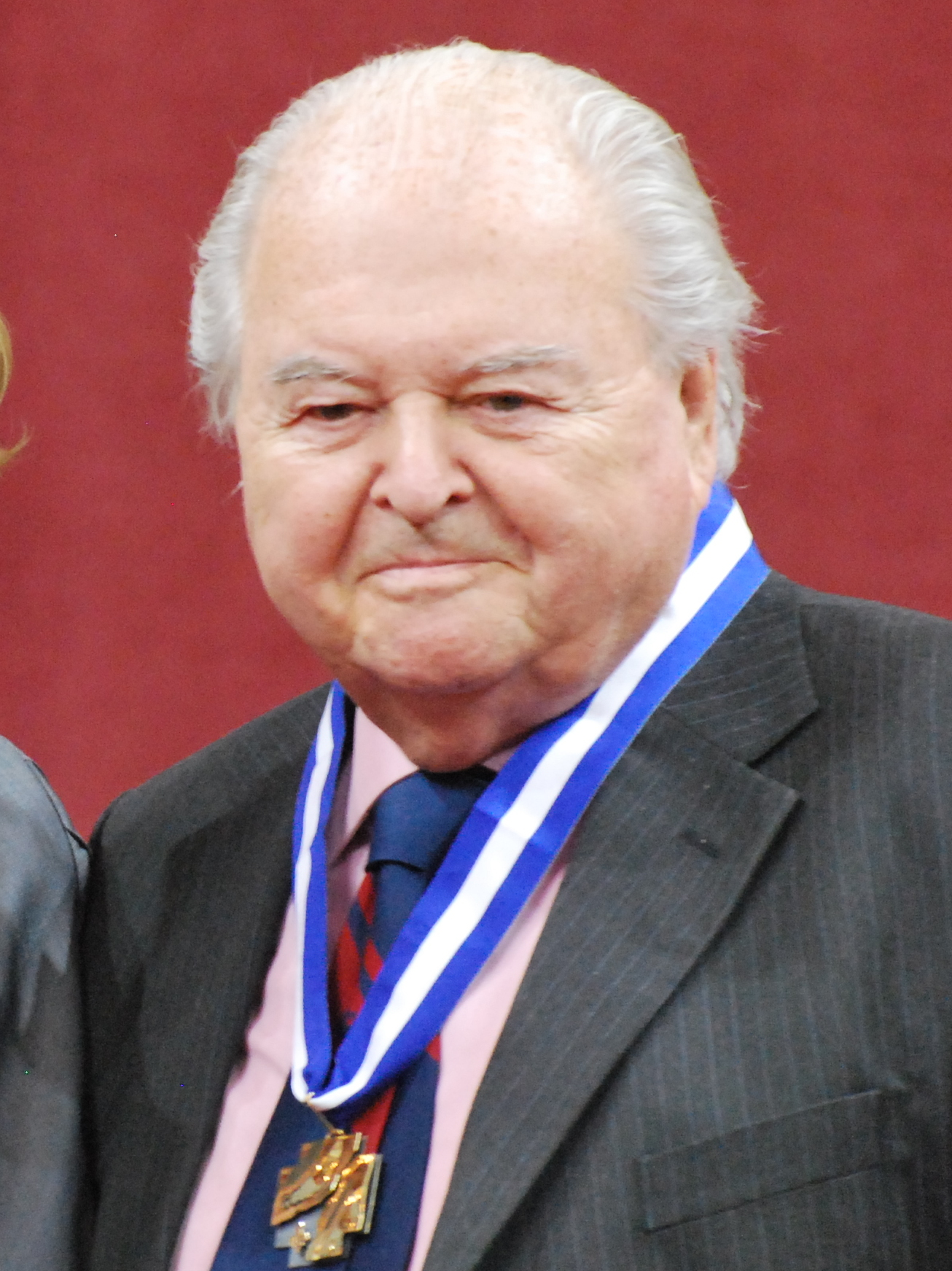
- Andermann in June 2013
- Born: September 26, 1930; Cernăuți, Kingdom of Romania (now Chernivtsi, Ukraine)
- Died: June 16, 2019 (aged 88); Montreal, Quebec, Canada
- Scientific career
- Fields: Neurology, Epileptology
- Institutions: Montreal Neurological Institute and Hospital, McGill University

Frederick Andermann (September 26, 1930 – June 16, 2019) was a Canadian neurologist and epileptologist.

== Biography ==
He was born and initially raised in Chernivtsi, belonging at that time to Romania, today Ukraine. When this area was annexed by the Soviet Union in 1940, his family first moved to Bucharest, then to Switzerland and France (Paris), before they immigrated to Canada in 1950, where he trained in medicine at the Université de Montréal and then neurology at the Montreal Neurological Institute and Hospital.

He was a professor at the Departments of Neurology and Neurosurgery and Pediatrics at McGill University in Montreal and was the director of the Epilepsy Unit and Clinic of the Montreal Neurological Institute and Hospital for many years. He was a founding member, president, and past president of the Canadian League Against Epilepsy, president of the Canadian Neurological Society, the Canadian Society for Clinical Neurophysiology, the Canadian Association of Child Neurologists and the Canadian Eastern EEG Society. In the International League Against Epilepsy, he was a chairman of the Task Force on Classification and of the Commission on Classification and Terminology from 1993 to 1997, first vice president from 2001 to 2005, and second vice president from 2005 to 2009.

His contributions to the field of epilepsy research are many. In 1972, he described Andermann syndrome, named after him together with his wife Eva Deutsch Andermann (also a neurologist and geneticist) and others.

== Awards ==
Andermann was the recipient of numerous awards in the course of his career for his dedication to epilepsy research and treatment.

Year	Award	Issuing body
2015	Lifetime Achievement Award	International League Against Epilepsy (ILAE) and International Bureau for Epilepsy(IBE)
2013	Officer of the Ordre national du Québec	Ordre national du Québec
2006	Order of Canada	Canada
2004	Alan Ross Prize	Canadian Paediatric Society
2003	Prix Wilder-Penfield	Prix du Québec
2000	William G. Lennox Award	American Epilepsy Society
1999	Penfield Award	League Against Epilepsy
1995	Distinguished Clinical Investigator Award	American Epilepsy Society and Milken Foundation
1989	Ambassador for Epilepsy	ILAE and IBE

== Books ==
- Andermann F, Lugaresi E, eds. Migraine and Epilepsy. Boston – London – Durban, et al., Butterworth 1987
- Andermann F, Rasmussen T, eds. Chronic Encephalitis and Epilepsy. Rasmussen's Syndrome. Boston – London – Oxford, Butterworth-Heinemann 1991
- Andermann F, Rasmussen T, eds. Chronic Encephalitis and Epilepsy. Rasmussen’s Syndrome"". Boston – London – Oxford, Butterworth-Heinemann 1991
- Andermann F, Beaumanoir A, Mira L, et al, eds. Occipital Seizures and Epilepsies in Children. Colloquium of the Pierfranco e Luisa Mariano Foundation. Mariana Foundation Pediatric Neurology Series: 1. London – Paris – Rome, J. Libbey 1993
- Shorvon SD, Fish DR, Andermann F, Bydder GM, Stefan H, eds. Magnetic Resonance Scanning and Epilepsy. Proceedings of a NATO Advanced Research Workshop on Advanced Magnetic Resonance and Epilepsy, held October 1–3, 1992, in Chalfont St. Peter, Buckinghamshire, United Kingdom (NATO ASI Series; Series A: Life Sciences, Vol 264). New York – London, Plenum Press (New York, Springer Science + Business Media) 1994
- Andermann F, Aicardi J, Vigevano F, eds. Alternating Hemiplegia of Childhood (International Review of Child Neurology Series). New York, Raven Press, 1994
- Guerrini R, Andermann F, Canapicchi R, et al, eds. "Dysplasias of Cerebral Cortex and Epilepsy". Philadelphia – New York, Lippincott – Raven 1996
- Beaumanoir A, Andermann F, Avanzini G, Mira L, eds. Falls in Epileptic and Non-epileptic Seizures During Childhood (Mariani Foundation Paediatric Neurology: 6). London – Paris – Rome – Sydney, J. Libbey 1997
- Gobbi G, Andermann F, Naccarato S, Banchini G, eds. Epilepsy and other Neurological Disorders in Coeliac Disease. London – Paris – Rome – Sydney, J. Libbey 1997
- Zifkin BG, Andermann F, Beaumanoir A, Rowan AJ, eds. Reflex Epilepsies and Reflex Seizures (Advances in Neurology, Vol 75). Philadelphia – New York Lippincott – Raven 1998
- Stefan H, Andermann F, Chauvel P, Shorvon SD, eds. "Plasticity in Epilepsy: Dynamic Aspects of Brain Function" (Advances in Neurology, Vol 81). Philadelphia – Baltimore – New York, et al, Lippincott Williams & Wilkins 1999
- Spreafico R, Avanzini G, Andermann F, eds. Abnormal Cortical Development and Epilepsy. From Basic to Clinical Science (Mariani Foundation Paediatric Neurology: 7). London, J. Libbey, 1999
- Guerrini R, Aicardi J, Andermann F, Hallett M, eds. Epilepsy and Movement Disorders. Cambridge – New York – Port Melbourne, et al, Cambridge University Press 2002
- Beaumanoir A, Andermann F, Chauvel P, et al, eds. Frontal Lobe Seizures and Epilepsies in Children (Mariani Foundation Paediatric Neurology: 11). Montrouge, J. Libbey Eurotext 2003
- Hirsch E, Andermann F, Chauvel P, et al, eds. Generalized Seizures: From Clinical Phenomenology to underlying Systems and Networks (Progress in Epileptic Disorders, Vol 2). Montrouge – Esher, J. Libbey Eurotext 2006
- Shorvon SD, Andermann F, Guerrini R, eds. "The Causes of Epilepsy. Common and Uncommon Causes in Adults and Children". Cambridge – New York – Melbourne, et al., Cambridge University Press 2011
