= Arnold Johnson (physician) =

Canadian cardiologist

Arnold Johnson CM FRCPC

Personal details
- Born: 1916
- Died: October 19, 2006 (aged 89–90)
- Occupation: Cardiologist

Arnold Johnson (1916 – October 19, 2006) was a Canadian cardiologist and founder of the Department of Cardiology at McMaster University. He is most well known for performing the first heart catheterization procedure in Canada in 1946.

== Education and career ==
Johnson completed his undergraduate medical education at McGill University. He subsequently served as a medical officer in the Royal Canadian Navy during World War II. In 1945, he completed a post-graduate fellowship at Harvard University with Paul Dudley White. Upon returning to Canada, he performed the first heart catheterization procedure at the Montreal Children's Hospital in 1946. The following year, in 1947, he was appointed Director of Cardiology at the Royal Victoria Hospital in Montreal. He pioneered the first cardiac pacemaker and also developed the first comprehensive cardiopulmonary resuscitation (CPR) program. In 1971, he completed a joint fellowship at Université Laval and University of North Carolina in clinical epidemiology. In 1974, he moved to McMaster University, helping in the founding of its Department of Cardiology.
