= Harold Griffith =

Canadian anesthesiologist

Harold Randall Griffith (July 25, 1894 – 1985) was a Canadian anesthesiologist and a leader in the fields of anesthesiology.

== History ==
Griffith was born in Montreal the son of Alexander Randall Griffith, a medical doctor and homeopathic practitioner. His medical studies at McGill University were interrupted by World War I, where he served in the No 6. Field Ambulance and was awarded the Military Medal for bravery at Vimy Ridge. He received his MDCM from McGill University in 1922, and an MD in homeopathic medicine from Hahnemann Medical College in Philadelphia in 1923.

He developed his interest in anaesthesia as a medical student during which time he administered many anaesthetics and developed an acute awareness of the subtleties essential for safe anaesthesia practice with the drugs and techniques available at that time. Anaesthesia became his professional career and he served as Anaesthetist-in-Chief at the Montreal Homeopathic Hospital, subsequently renamed the Queen Elizabeth Hospital, from 1923 to 1959, and remained active as an anaesthetist until 1966.

He introduced the use of ethylene (1923) and cyclopropane (1933) into Canadian anaesthetic practice. The outstanding achievement of his career was the introduction of muscle relaxants to the practice of anaesthesia on January 23, 1942, when he and resident Enid Johnson used curare for the first time during anesthesia to produce muscle relaxation. On that day, almost one hundred years after ether anesthesia had been demonstrated by William Morton, he revolutionized the practice of anesthesia by demonstrating that a substance, which until then had been considered a poison, could be safely used to produce muscle relaxation for surgery. The introduction of muscle relaxants reduced anesthetic requirements, increased the scope of surgery, improved operating conditions and decreased morbidity and probably mortality.

In 1943 Dr. Griffith established the first postoperative recovery room in Canada which he believed may have been his major contribution to patient care.

He organized the Society of Canadian Anaesthetists in Montreal, which in 1943 would become the Canadian Anaesthetists' Society, and was the Society's first President. He was Vice-President of the American Society of Anesthesiologists in 1946, elected President of the International Anesthesia Research Society in 1948 and from 1949 to 1952 served as Chairman of the Board of Trustees. From 1951 to 1955 he became involved in formation of the World Federation of Societies of Anaesthesiologists. He was elected President at the first meeting held in the Netherlands in 1955. From 1951 to 1956 he served as Professor and Chairman of the Department of Anaesthesia of McGill University. He published over seventy medical publications over the course of his career. His personal papers conserved at the Osler Library of the History of Medicine, McGill University, pertain to his introduction of curare into anesthesiology and contain correspondence, case records, and reprints in addition to the minute book of the Montreal Homeopathic Association.

== Recognition ==
Feltrinelli Prize of Academe dei Lincei, Rome, 1954.
Hickman Medal of Royal Society of Medicine, London, 1956.
Distinguished Service Award, American Society of Anesthesiologists, 1959. (Only non-American to receive this award.)
Founder-President, World Federation of Societies of Anesthesiologists, 1959.
Canadian Anaesthetists' Society Medal, 1962.
Ralph Waters Award, Illinois Society of Anesthesiology, 1970.
Officer, Order of Canada, 1974.
Honorary LLD, University of Saskatchewan, 1974.
Canada Post Commemorative Stamp, 1991.
McGill University established the Harold R Griffith Research Chair in Anesthesia in 1992.
