= Barbara Jones =

Barbara Jones may refer to:

- Barbara Jones (artist) (1912–1978), English artist, writer and mural painter
- Barbara Jones (astronomer), British and American infrared astronomer
- Barbara Jones (diplomat), Irish diplomat
- Barbara Jones (singer) (c. 1952–2014), Jamaican singer
- Barbara Jones (skier) (born 1977), American Olympic skier
- Barbara Jones (sprinter) (born 1937), American track and field sprinter
- Barbara A. Jones (1960–2024), American physicist
- Barbara Ann Posey Jones (born 1943), leader of the 1958 Katz Drug Store sit-in as a high school student
- Barbara E. Jones (1944–2022), American-Canadian neuroscientist
- Barbara O. Jones (1941–2024), American actress
- Barbara S. Jones (born 1947), federal judge for the US District Court for the Southern District of New York
- Barbara Jones-Gordon, Canadian curler
