= Luis de Rivera =

Spanish psychiatrist (born 1944)

José Luis Gonzalez de Rivera y Revuelta (commonly known as Luis de Rivera; born 1944) is a Spanish-Canadian psychiatrist, academic, author, and clinician. He is known for his work in psychosomatic medicine, psychotherapy, Autogenic training, workplace psychological abuse (mobbing), and stress-related psychopathology. He has held professorships in Canada and Spain and has authored numerous books and scientific articles in psychiatry. He is a numerary member of the Royal European Academy of Doctors.

== Early life and education ==
De Rivera was born in 1944 in Bilbao, Spain. He earned his medical degree (MD) from the University of Navarra and is a Licentiate of the Medical Council of Canada (LMCC). He specialized in internal medicine at the Universidad Complutense de Madrid under the supervision of Professor Arturo Fernández-Cruz.

During postgraduate training in Montreal, Canada, he completed an international PhD in medical science with Frederick Andermann at the Montreal Neurological Institute, McGill University, and with José Guimón at the Universidad de Bilbao in the Basque Country.

He subsequently specialized in psychiatry and psychotherapy as a resident physician at McGill University affiliated teaching hospitals in Montreal, including Montreal General Hospital, Douglas Psychiatric Hospital, Montreal Children’s Hospital, and Royal Victoria Hospital. He served as Chief Resident and Teaching Fellow at Douglas Hospital, working with Heinz Lehmann, who introduced neuroleptics in the treatment of schizophrenia.

While in Montreal, he trained in psychoanalysis at the Canadian Institute of Psychoanalysis and later at the American Academy of Psychoanalysis in New York. He obtained membership in the American Academy of Psychoanalysis with his thesis Learning to Free Associate: the tool Freud was looking for.

His interest in stress research developed following a stay with Hans Selye at the Stress Institute in Montreal. He subsequently collaborated closely with Wolfgang Luthe and became his successor as chairman of the International Committee of autogenic training (ICAT).

== Academic and clinical career ==
De Rivera began his academic career in Canada as a Lecturer in Psychiatry at McGill University and as a staff psychiatrist at Montreal General Hospital, where he founded the Psychosomatic Unit. He collaborated with Habib Davanloo in the Short-Term Dynamic Psychotherapy Unit and served as a consultant to the Montreal Neurological Institute.

He later moved to Ontario, where he became Full Professor of Psychiatry at McMaster University in Hamilton and Head of the Department of Psychiatry at Hamilton Civic Hospitals.

Returning to Spain, de Rivera served as Full Professor of Psychiatry, Chairman of the Department of Psychiatry, and Vice Dean of the Medical School at the Universidad de La Laguna in the Canary Islands, as well as Chief of the Department of Psychiatry at the Hospital Universitario de Canarias. He later held the position of Director of the Department of Psychiatry at Fundación Jiménez Díaz University Hospital in Madrid and Professor of Psychiatry at the Autonomous University of Madrid.

He holds tenure as a state-appointed full professor under Spain’s Ministry of Health and has participated regularly in national selection committees for public university professorships. He has overseen postgraduate psychiatry training programs at teaching hospitals affiliated with Universidad de La Laguna and the Autonomous University of Madrid, supervised approximately 30 doctoral theses, and directed multiple educational programs in psychosomatic medicine and psychotherapy.

== Research and clinical contributions ==
=== Clinical psychiatry and psychopathology ===
De Rivera’s research integrates clinical psychiatry, neurobiology, and psychophysiology, with a focus on the interaction between psychological processes and medical illness. He has explored the relationship between creativity, altered states of consciousness, and psychosis, describing a proposed nosological variant of manic-depressive illness referred to as creative psychoses.

He has directed epidemiological studies in psychiatry and co-coordinated the treatise The Epidemiological Method in Mental Health. He has also developed and adapted several psychopathological measurement instruments, including Spanish versions of Derogatis’ Symptom Checklist (SCL-90) the Brief Symptom Scale (LSB-50), the de Rivera Stress Reactivity Index, and the Computerized Memory Test (TMO), used in dementia rehabilitation and differential diagnosis.

While working in the Canary Islands, de Rivera conducted research on biometeorological influences on psychiatric symptoms, including weather, seasonal changes, and meteorotropism, contributing empirical data on environmental sensitivity in psychiatric populations. In recognition of his achievements, he became a corresponding member of the Royal Academy of Medicine of Canarias and of the Academy of Science and Humanities of Lanzarote.

=== Psychosomatic medicine and stress research ===
De Rivera is known for his work in psychosomatic medicine, focusing on stress-related syndromes, somatoform disorders, and psychosocial determinants of physical illness. He validated and adapted the Holmes and Rahe Stress Scale for Spanish populations and confirmed the role of life events as a factor contributing to vulnerability to psychiatric and medical disorders.

His research identified distinct emotional, vegetative, cognitive, and behavioral patterns of stress response in the general population, formalized in the de Rivera Stress Reactivity Index. He demonstrated that combined use of life event scales and stress reactivity measures improves prediction of illness vulnerability under stress.

=== Workplace psychological abuse and mobbing ===
De Rivera has extensively studied workplace psychological abuse (mobbing), conceptualizing it as a form of chronic stress resulting from cumulative micro-traumatic events. His work links mobbing to increased risk of medical and psychiatric disorders.

He has authored numerous publications on workplace harassment, developed prevention and intervention programs, and organized the lecture series Las Claves del Mobbing, later published as an influential book. He also developed the Harassment Strategies Questionnaire (LIPT-60), widely used in Spanish-speaking countries.

In this context, he identified psychological traits associated with abusive leadership, described as the Active Inoperative Mediocrity Syndrome (MIA syndrome), and proposed strategies to mitigate its impact.

Autogenic training and psychotherapy

A disciple of Wolfgang Luthe, de Rivera modernized autogenic training by integrating psychodynamic concepts and comparing the method with mindfulness and meditation practices. His textbook Autogenics 3.0 has been translated into multiple languages and discussed by British physician and author Ian R. F. Ross, who incorporated the Autogenics 3.0 format into his own teaching and published a series of articles examining its principles and exercises. The approach was also presented at a Grand Round of McGill University's Department of Psychiatry.

He developed an integrative therapeutic framework known as Sequential Integrative Psychotherapy (PSI), combining psychoanalytic, cognitive-behavioral, and autogenic methods. He founded and directed the Diploma Course in Psychotherapy at the Autonomous University of Madrid and has contributed to multiple postgraduate training programs.

He has emphasized common factors in psychotherapy, including therapist qualities such as tolerance for ambiguity and empathic capacity. He also introduced the concept of ecpathy as a complement to empathy, aimed at protecting clinicians from emotional contagion.

== Honors ==
De Rivera is a past president and honorary member of the Spanish Society of Psychosomatic Medicine and the Spanish Society of Psychotherapy. He is a member of the Royal Academy of Medicine of the Canary Islands and the Academy of Science, Engineering, and Humanities of Lanzarote. He currently serves as president of the International Society of Autogenic Training and Psychotherapy (ISATAP).

His awards include the American Psychosomatic Society Annual Award (2008), the Vallejo Award of the Madrid Medical College, the Silver Medal of the Royal Academy of Medicine of Spain, and additional national and international distinctions.

== Publications ==
De Rivera has authored numerous books and scientific articles in psychiatry, psychosomatic medicine, psychotherapy, stress research, and workplace mental health. His publications include El Test de Memoria por Ordenador, El Maltrato Psicológico, Medicina Psicosomática, Crisis Emocionales, Dependencias Afectivas, Autogenics 3.0, and Síndromes de Estrés.
