= Rolando Del Maestro =

Italian-born Canadian neurosurgeon (born 1949)

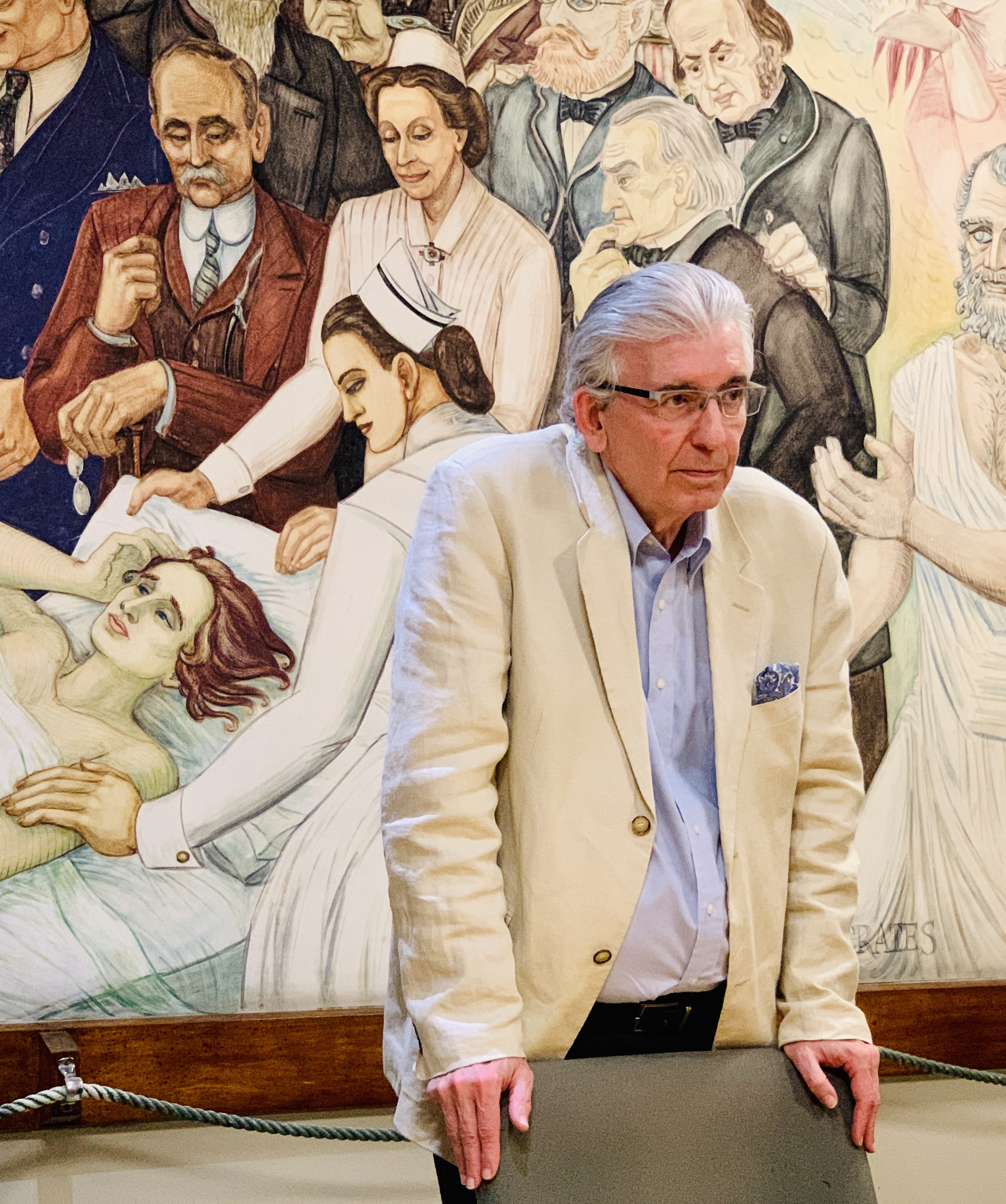
- Rolando Del Maestro, Montreal Neurological Hospital (2019). Sir William Osler is depicted in the background.
- Born: Rolando Fausto Del Maestro; 1949 (age 76–77); Borgotaro, Italy
- Education: University of Western Ontario; University of Uppsala
- Occupation: Surgeon
- Known for: “Awake” brain surgery; Virtual reality and artificial intelligence technology
- Medical career
- Profession: Neurosurgeon
- Institutions: University of Western Ontario; McGill University; McGill University Health Centre/Montreal Neurological Institute and Hospital

Rolando Fausto Del Maestro (born 1949) is an Italian-born Canadian neurosurgeon, the William Feindel Professor Emeritus in neuro-oncology and director of the Neurosurgical Simulation Research Center at the Montreal Neurological Institute and Hospital, where he has been involved in simulating real brain surgery by creating virtual setting scenarios, founded upon the principles of flight simulation.

From 1981 to 2000, as director of the Brain Research Laboratories at the University of Western Ontario, his main work and research focussed on brain tumours, tumour invasiveness and angiogenesis. He also made developments in “awake” brain surgery, where people can respond as the operation progresses. He is a co-founder of the Brain Research Fund Foundation of Canada.

Del Maestro possesses one of the largest private collections of materials related to Leonardo da Vinci, and in 1996 curated an exhibition titled "Leonardo da Vinci; The Search for the Soul".

== Early life and education ==
Rolando Del Maestro was born in Borgotaro, Italy, in 1949. In 1967 he gained admission to the University of Western Ontario, from where he received his MD in 1973.

== Career ==
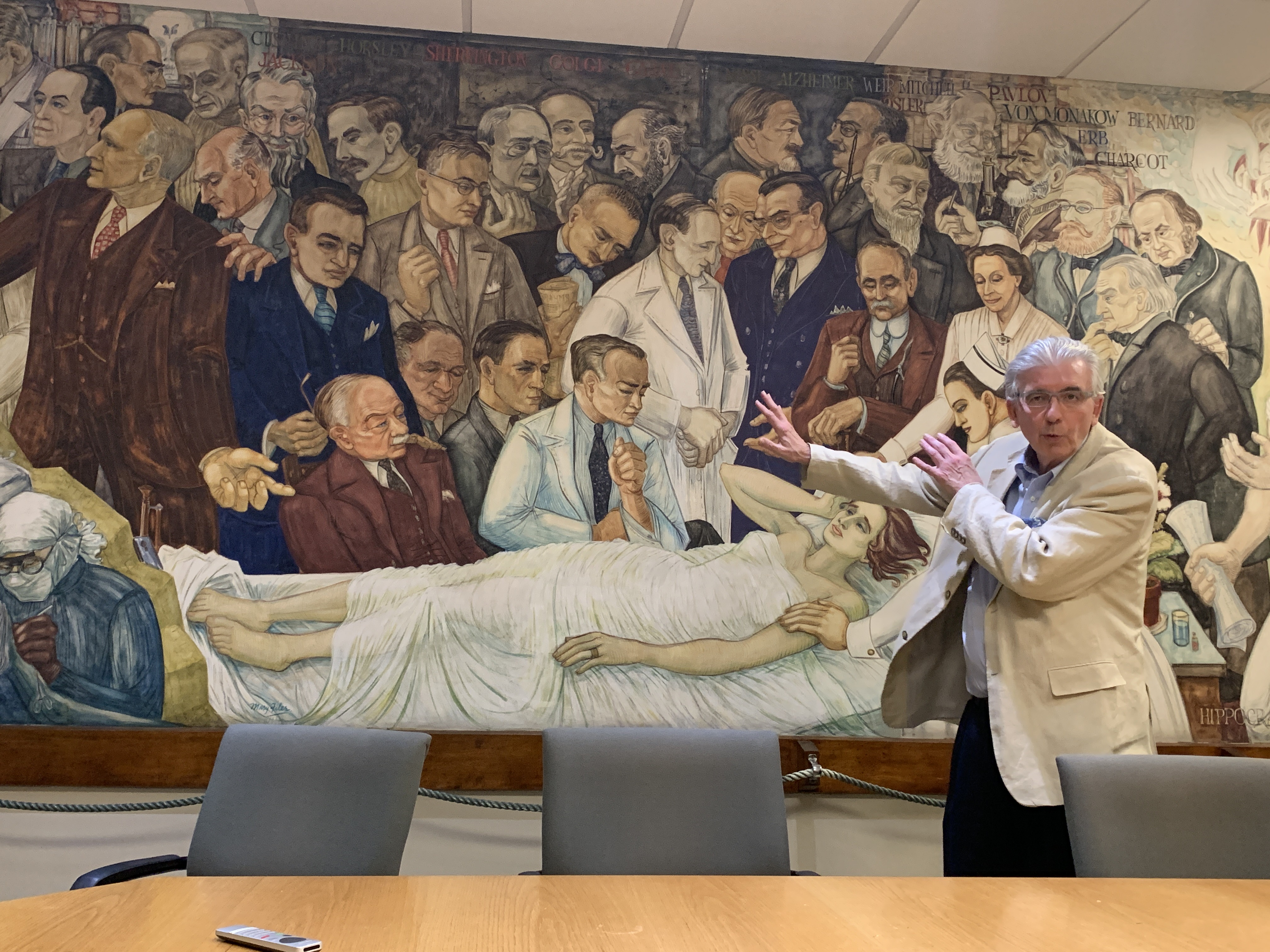
Rolando Del Maestro at the Montreal Neurological Hospital (MNH) at McGill University Health Centre (2019)

After graduation, Del Maestro completed five years of junior medical training and neurosurgical residency. In 1979, he received his Ph.D. in the subject of biochemistry from the University of Uppsala, Sweden, where he focused on mechanisms of free radical injury in the small blood vessels. The following year, he received a fellowship in neurosurgery from the Royal College of Physicians and Surgeons of Canada.

From 1981 to 2000, as director of the Brain Research Laboratories at the University of Western Ontario, his main work and research focussed on brain tumours, tumour invasiveness and angiogenesis. In 1991, he was appointed professor of neurosurgery. He moved to the Montreal Neurological Hospital (MNH) at McGill University Health Centre in 2000. Four years later he gained the William Feindel Professorship in neuro-oncology. He made developments in “awake” brain surgery, where people can respond as the operation progresses, and is the director of the Neurosurgical Simulation Research Center at the MNH at McGill. In 2006 he authored a book titled A History of Neuro-Oncology.

Del Maestro has been involved in simulating real brain surgery by creating virtual reality scenarios, founded upon the principles of flight simulation. In 2020, this was demonstrated in a study published in The Journal of the American Medical Association. The study evaluated how well medical students and surgeons performed in such a setting. The idea came after observing the reduction in fatal aircraft accidents following the global use of simulation in the aviation industry. The adapted simulator, "NeuroVR", developed with the National Research Council of Canada (NRC), allows neurosurgeons to practice brain surgery. He explained how his team “took tumours out and measured their density and then put all that information into the simulator” ... and ... “took colour and put that into the simulator, the way the blood vessels bleed”. The simulator is then able to determine whether the operator is junior or more of an expert, he stated in an interview about the research.

== Other roles ==
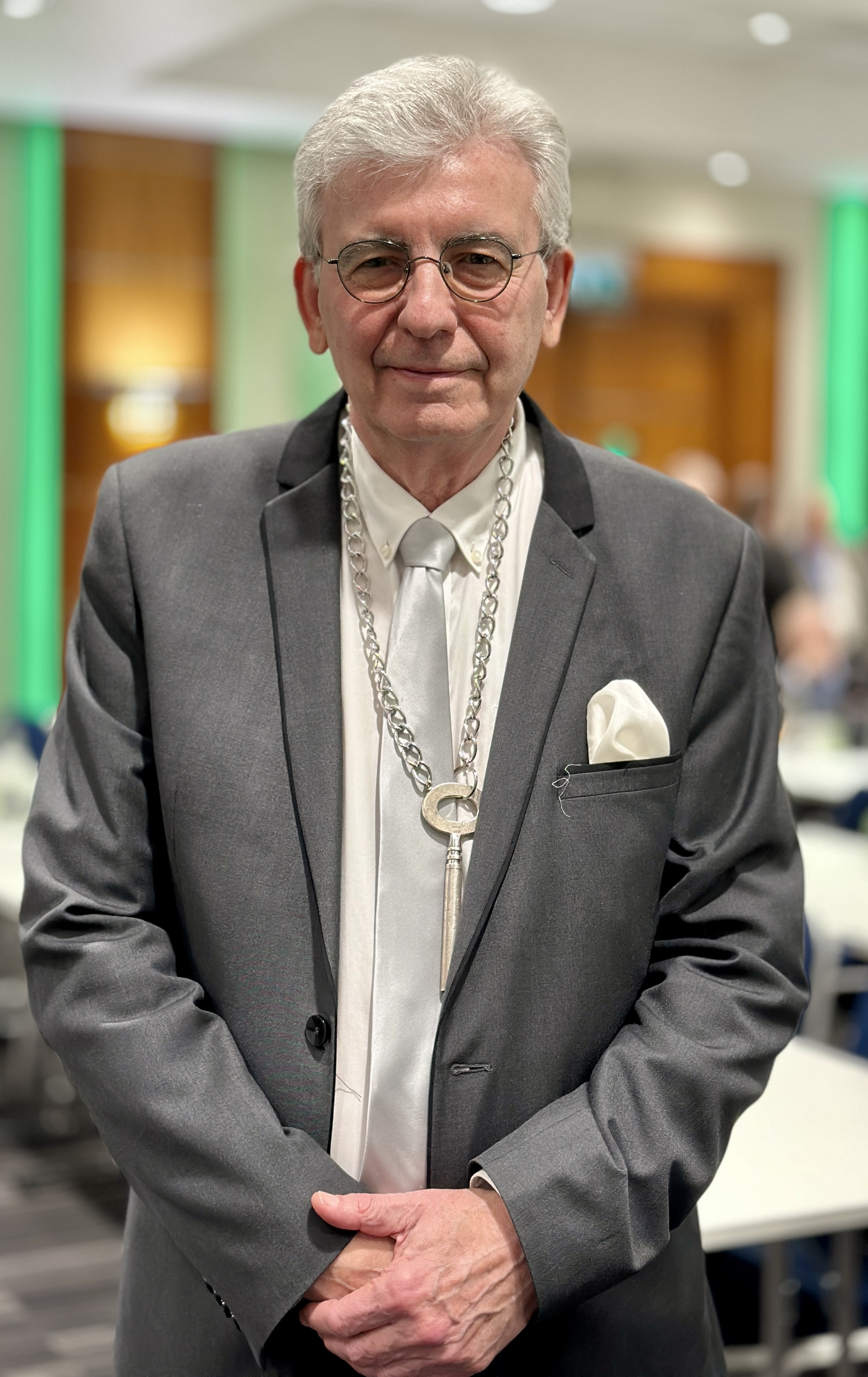
Del Maestro with latchkey chain, London (president AOS 2023)

In 1982, Del Maestro co-founded the Brain Research Fund Foundation of Canada, a charity inspired by Steve Northey whose daughter died from a brain tumour. The foundation later became the Brain Tumour Foundation of Canada, which organizes support groups and provides research funds.

Del Maestro and his wife Pam, helped finance "The Pam and Rolando Del Maestro Family William Osler Medical Student Essay Awards", established by the Medical Students’ Osler Society and the Board of Curators of the Osler Library of the History of Medicine. He retired in 2012. In 2023, he was appointed president of the American Osler Society (AOS).

He is a member and part of the board of directors of the Pan-American Academy of History of Medicine, created at the University of Costa Rica in 2015.

== Awards and honours ==
- Paul Harris Fellowship from Rotary International (1995).
- Heroes of Health Care by the National Post and Siemens (2000).
- Order of Merit, National Congress of Italian Canadians (2010)

== Leonardo da Vinci collection ==
Del Maestro possesses one of the largest private collections of materials related to Leonardo da Vinci. In 1996, he curated an exhibition titled 'Leonardo da Vinci; The Search for the Soul'.

== Personal and family ==
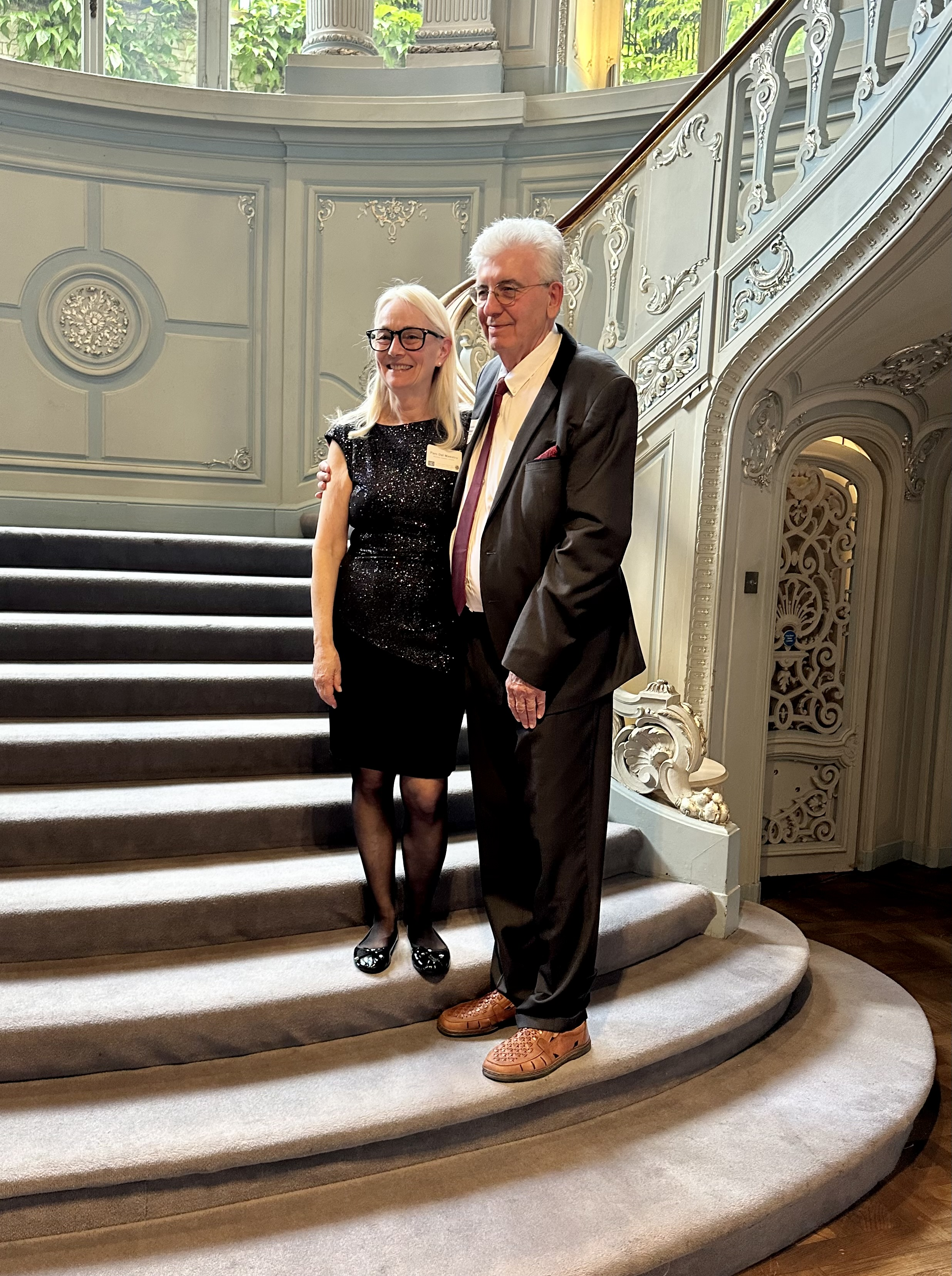
Rolando and wife Pamela, (Savile Club, 2023)

Del Maestro is married to Pamela. They have three children.

== Selected publications ==
=== Articles ===
- Del Maestro, R. F. (1980). "An approach to free radicals in medicine and biology". Acta Physiologica Scandinavica. Supplementum. 492: 153–168. ISSN 0302-2994. PMID 6261528.
- "Leonardo da Vinci: The search for the soul". Journal of Neurosurgery. 89 (5). December 1998.
- Mason, W. P.; Maestro, R. D.; Eisenstat, D.; Forsyth, P.; Fulton, D.; Laperrière, N.; MacDonald, D.; Perry, J.; Thiessen, B.; Canadian GBM Recommendations Committee (June 2007). "Canadian recommendations for the treatment of glioblastoma multiforme". Current Oncology. 14 (3): 110–117. doi:10.3747/co.2007.119. ISSN 1198-0052. PMC 1899357. PMID 17593983. (Joint author)
- Delorme, S.; Laroche, D.; Diraddo, R.; Del Maestro, R. F. (September 2012). "NeuroTouch: a physics-based virtual simulator for cranial microneurosurgery training". Neurosurgery. 71 (1 Suppl Operative): 32–42. doi:10.1227/NEU.0b013e318249c744. ISSN 1524-4040. PMID 22233921. S2CID 14079929. (Joint author)
- Winkler-Schwartz, Alexander; Yilmaz, Recai; Mirchi, Nykan; Bissonnette, Vincent; Ledwos, Nicole; Siyar, Samaneh; Azarnoush, Hamed; Karlik, Bekir; Del Maestro, Rolando (August 2, 2019). "Machine Learning Identification of Surgical and Operative Factors Associated With Surgical Expertise in Virtual Reality Simulation". JAMA Network Open. 2 (8): e198363. doi:10.1001/jamanetworkopen.2019.8363. PMID 31373651. (Joint author)

=== Books ===
- A History of Neuro-Oncology. DW Medical Consulting. 2008. ISBN 978-0771706356.
