= Kevin Petrecca =

Neurosurgical oncologist

Kevin Petrecca FRCSC
- Born: Niagara Falls
- Occupations: Neurosurgeon, Oncologist, Researcher
- Spouse: Myriam Douville
- Children: Sarah, Élodie, Loic

Kevin Petrecca FRCSC is a neurosurgical oncologist, currently chief of the Department of Neurosurgery at the McGill University Health Centre and appointed as the William Feindel Chair in Neuro-Oncology at McGill University in Montreal, Quebec, Canada.

== Biography ==
He is originally from Niagara Falls, Ontario.

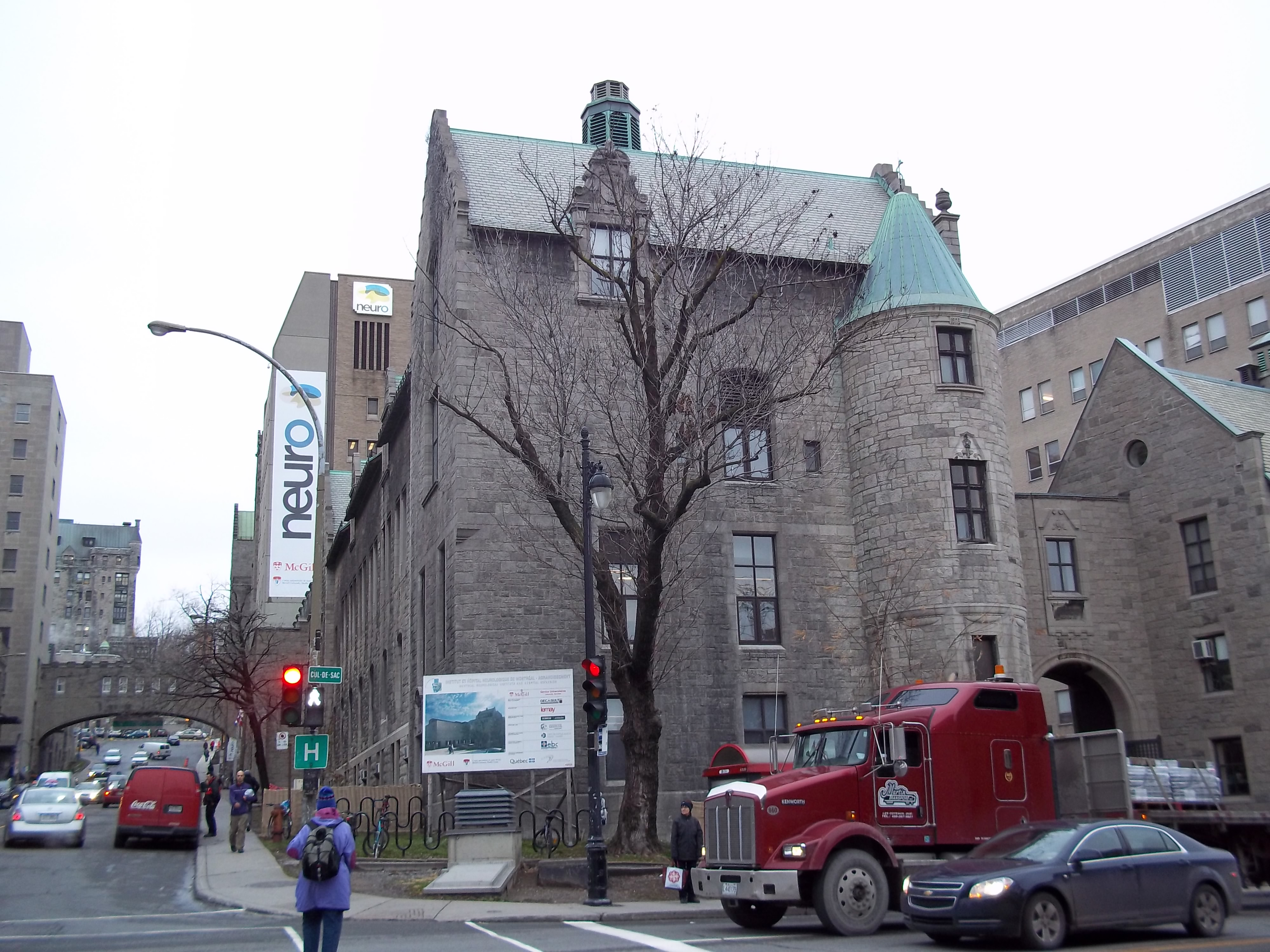
The Montreal Neurological Institute and Hospital

He holds both a Doctor of Medicine (M.D.) and a Doctor of Philosophy (Ph.D.), in addition to being certified as a fellow of the Royal College of Physicians and Surgeons of Canada in neurosurgery and oncology.

He is currently an attending neurosurgical oncologist at the Montreal Neurological Institute and Hospital within the McGill University Health Centre, in addition to being the chief of the Department of Neurosurgery. He dedicates his practice to treating brain cancer patients, particularly those with glioblastoma.

He also holds an appointment as associate professor in the Department of Neurology and Neurosurgery at McGill University.

== Research ==
His research focuses mostly on the treatment of brain cancers, particularly glioblastoma, which typically do not respond to conventional cancer treatments.

== Internal link ==
- William Feindel
