= Cathy Maguire =

- Born: 1981 (age 44–45); Dundalk, County Louth, Ireland
- Occupations: Singer, songwriter, model, TV presenter
- Website: www.cathymaguire.com

Cathy Maguire is an Irish singer, songwriter, model and TV presenter who was born in Dundalk, County Louth, Ireland, on 11 October 1981. At a young age Maguire became a child star, recording her first album at age twelve. At the request of several listeners, she was invited by Gerry Ryan to perform a live set on his radio program, an opportunity that sparked a career that included numerous TV appearances and production of three albums by the time she was 17.

== Education ==
Maguire attended Redeemer Girls Primary School in Dundalk, County Louth, the school which the three sisters of the internationally renowned band The Corrs attended. She then attended Dun Lughaidh Secondary School, an all-girls Catholic school also attended by The Corr sisters.

After her college education, Maguire moved to the United States and went to work in Nashville as a songwriter. She released an album entitled Portrait on 17 April 2009, which was reviewed favorably by critics with Hot Press magazine awarding the album four stars out of five. The album was released by Celtic Collections, the label behind the phenomenally successful Celtic Woman. Three of the album's songs were co-written with Roger Cook, of the well-known song writing duo Cook and Greenaway. Maguire toured extensively with The High Kings, who are also on the Celtic Collection label. She opened for Martina McBride on her Irish 2009 tour.

Maguire holds a BA Hons degree in Applied Music from Dundalk Institute of Technology, specialising in Ethnomusicology. In 2006, Maguire signed to Dublin modeling agency, Morgan, exiting in 2010.

== Cyber-bullying controversy ==
In 2006, Maguire became the victim of trolling by an anonymous blogger. The attacks attracted national media attention and sparked a national discussion on cyber-bullying spearheaded by The Times. Maguire took unprecedented legal action in previously uncharted legal waters and eventually the blog was shut down. Maguire declined to comment publicly when contacted by the Sunday Times and Irish Independent.

== Television and film projects ==
In 2010, Maguire moved to New York City, where she is now based. In 2013, she hosted a music TV presentation, Ireland in Song, which aired on PBS.

In 2016, Maguire created and hosted The Sunnyside Sessions for Irish TV. Filmed in her New York garden, the show featured performances from prominent local music artists. The program launched at a reception hosted by Consul General Barbara Jones at the Irish Consulate in New York City. The Sunnyside Sessions aired in Ireland and the UK in September 2016. The first live show of The Sunnyside Sessions was performed on 6 April 2017, at the Irish Arts Center, in Hells Kitchen, Manhattan.

== New Music ==
In December 2012, Maguire signed a deal with long-time mentor and friend, Hall of Fame inductee Cowboy Jack Clement. She recorded an album produced by Clement in his Nashville studios. The album was completed in May 2013 and was the last album Clement was to produce. The release date of this album is still unknown.

On 19 August 2013, Maguire also launched an Irish album entitled Ireland in Song in New York City. The album is a companion piece to her PBS TV program of the same name and explores the top ten most famous Irish ballads including unique interpretations of "Danny Boy", "Molly Malone", and "Carrickfergus". In February 2014, Ireland In Song was nominated for Best New Irish Album award by The Irish Music Awards USA.

On March 15, 2020, Maguire released a duet with Americana legend, Steve Earle. The song was entitled Ireland and was debuted across the USA on Sirius radio. Due to the unfolding Covid crisis, all planned interviews and related TV appearances were postponed.

== Awards and accolades ==
In Nov 2013, Maguire was honored by the Louth Society of New York for outstanding ambassadorship of County Louth, Ireland, where she was born. She was subsequently the guest of honor at the 107th Louth Society of New York Dinner, held in NYC and was the youngest recipient of the honor in its one hundred and seventh year history.

In 2014, Maguire was named by The Irish Echo in its Top 40 Under 40 Award. This widely popular event is a celebration of leading Irish and Irish Americans who have distinguished themselves in their respective fields of work before reaching the age of forty.

Maguire was also presented with the Irish Echo's People's Choice Award, which was voted on by members of the public, recording a record number of votes in the award's history.

In 2015, Maguire was inducted as a member of The Order of St.Patrick by Heritage Publishing upon the launch in Chicago's Irish Heritage Center of The Irish American Tradition.

On 17 March 2017, she was invited by Cardinal Timothy Dolan to sing at the official St. Patrick's Day Mass in St. Patrick.s Cathedral. The performance went viral and was viewed over 1 million times in the days following the performanc. The collective views of this performance now number in excess of seven million across social media platforms.

In 2017, Maguire curated the musical program for a Memorial Mass for Martin McGuinness, held in St. Patrick's Cathedral in New York City, drawing considerable praise for her rendition of "Only Her Rivers Run Free," which she sang in memory of McGuinness. During the Mass, she also debuted "I See His Blood Upon The Rose," a piece that she had composed to the words of a poem by Joseph Mary Plunkett. The piece was written for voice, uilleann pipes, organ and violin, and was arranged by Dr. Heather Martin Bixler.

== Controversies ==
On January 20, 2017 Maguire attended the inauguration of U.S. President Donald Trump in Washington, D.C. Maguire streamed the event live to a significant fan base on social media which caused enormous backlash from viewers. As a result, Maguire issued a statement clarifying her political position to The Irish Independent.

On April 30, 2023 Maguire sang Ireland's National Anthem in Madison Square Gardens, New York City at the history making boxing match between Katie Taylor and Amanda Serrano. In a post fight press conference, Serrano's manager Jake Paul stated that Maguire had conceded privately that the Serrano had won the fight. Maguire vehemently denied the allegation in an article published in the Sunday World the following Sunday.
