= Albert Aguayo =

Canadian neurologist (born 1934)

- Born: Albert Juan Aguayo; July 16, 1934 (age 92); Argentina
- Occupation: Neuroscientist
- Known for: Research in neural regeneration
- Awards: Order of Canada

Albert Juan Aguayo (born July 16, 1934) is an Argentine-Canadian neurologist at McGill University. Hailing from the Bahia Blanca in Argentina, Dr. Aguayo graduated in medicine from the National University of Córdoba. After graduating from Argentina, Aguayo continued to train in neurology, working as an assistant physician in Neurology University of Toronto and McGill University. In the year 1967, McGill University appointed Aguayo as assistant professor in the department of Neurology and Neurosurgery. From the years 2000 to 2005, Aguayo served as the Secretary General for the International Brain Research Organization and then proceeded to become the President of the International Brain Research Organization from the years 2006 to 2008

== Research and career ==
Dr. Aguayo is best known for his revolutionary research of the demonstration of nerve fibres and nerve function. Aguayo and his team were the first to demonstrate that nerve fibres that are located in the central nervous system and the brain of a mammal are capable of restoring themselves after considerable damage and/or injury. During this research, Aguayo used different techniques such as using lab animals. Aguayo's finding completely revolutionized the research of regenerative medicine. Even though Aguayo was highly skilled in clinical neurology, he decided to pursue his passion in experimental studies, focusing his research in neurobiology. In the beginning of his career at McGill University, Aguayo was recruited by Donald Baxter in the clinical neurosciences at McGill University. Recently, Aguayo implemented new types of policies in Neuroscience

== Other work ==
Aguayo's past organizational responsibilities also include the Presidency of the North-American Society for Neuroscience, the Canadian Association for Neuroscience and the Canadian Neurological Society. He also served for the Canadian Neuroscience Network of Centres of Excellence, working as the Scientific Director. As well as being a strong advocate of neuroscience, Aguayo has also given many lectures in Canadian, American and foreign universities that include McGill University and Harvard University. He strongly believes in the advancement of Neuroscience in Higher educational institutes. Aguayo is the author of more than 150 scientific publications and has received prestigious degrees from Lund University ad Queen's University. He has also taken part in the editorial board of 26 notable journals.

== Honours ==
From 2005 to 2008, Aguayo was the president of the International Brain Research Organization as well as being the former Director of McGill University's Centre of Research in Neuroscience. Aguayo is also the Chair of the Scientific Advisory Board of the Friedrich Miescher Institute located in the city of Basel, Switzerland and has also newly been appointed into the Consortium Advisory Panel. He has been the recipient of many awards and honorable mentions, including the Order of Canada. He was appointed fellow of the Royal Society in 1993. In 1988, Aguayo received the Canada Gairdner International Award For the discovery of the regrowth of neural connections being possible in injured mammalians' central nervous systems.
