= CernySmith Assessment =

Online questionnaire

The CernySmith Assessment (CSA) is a comprehensive online questionnaire developed by Leonard J. Cerny II and David S. Smith that inquires about the impact of change and stress on productivity and resilience.

This self-discovery assessment for personal growth, coaching, mentoring, and counseling helps answer three basic questions: 1) How am I doing? 2) What can I learn from how I am doing? and 3) What can I do about it?

== Description ==
The CernySmith Assessment consists of 68 objective questions and 10 subjective write-in questions that measure and describe the impact of change and stress as it relates to the adjustment and well-being of people in their own culture or living and working cross-culturally.

The CSA is online and is designed for people 14 years and older. The testing is self-managed, automated, and takes about 15 minutes to complete. After completion, the results are immediately generated for download in a personalized report. The self-discovery and coaching reports use nonjudgmental language and provide a balanced perspective of both strengths and challenges. The CSA includes strategies and tips on how to enhance transitions and adjustments.

The CSA provides a current stress-skills snapshot of adjustment during change and transition experiences. For overseas employees and/or family members, this assessment can be taken pre-field as a way to create baseline data that can be compared to any later CSA taken on-field/post-field. On-field and post-field assessments can be used for skill development tracking and re-entry assessing. It can be used once to assess adjustment, periodically (quarterly, annually), or whenever desired. It can also be used in debriefing settings including personal stresses, family stresses, and team stresses.

The assessment is available in 6 versions.

CSA-Standard (CSA-SD)	For Everyone and their families
CSA-Business (CSA-B)	For Business employees and their families
CSA-Diplomat (CSA-D)	For Diplomats and their families
CSA-Military (CSA-M)	For Military Personnel and their families
CSA-Non-Profit (CSA-N)	For NGO employees and their families
CSA-Student (CSA-S)	For Students

CSA Reports come in three versions: The CSA-Brief, the CSA-Feedback, and the CSA-Team.

The CSA-Brief is a concise 6 page, self-discovery and coaching report.

The CSA-Feedback is a 10-page report that provides personalized analysis of results for self-discovery and/or coaching by a certified CSA coach (mentor or counselor). The CSA-Feedback Report, when combined with performance based coaching can identify strengths and challenges and recommend practical steps in order to maximize performance and manage stress.

The CSA-Team (CSA-TR) is a 14-page report for teams and groups generated from 10 or more individualized reports. It can be used by companies, teams, and organizations to track company HR trends and progress. It provides data for analyzing group characteristics, tracking the impact of organizational policies, and assessing training needs.

=== CSA Domains and Scales with Cronbach's alpha Reliabilities ===
The CSA measures stress on 15 scales within 5 broad areas of adjustment: Organizational, Cultural, Relational, Resilience, and Foundational.

Organizational Domain (.85)
Organizational Relationship (.83)
Organizational Support (.76)
Workload (.77)
Cultural Domain (.83)
Adaptation (.76)
Transitions (.67)
Situational Crisis (.74)
Relational Domain (.80)
Effective Relationships (.78)
Family Adjustment (.78)
Extended Family/Friends (.65)
Resilience Domain (.83)
Well-being (.75)
Past Stresses (.69)
Focus (.66)
Foundational Domain (.83)
Spirituality (.85)
Health (.61)
Habits (.74)

== Development ==
In 1995, psychologist Leonard Cerny II saw the need to assess the stress and well-being of international teams in regards to their intercultural adjustment and attrition problems. Consulting with psychologist Kelly O'Donnell, Cerny developed a pilot 100 item Likert assessment in a conceptual format parallel to the Symptom Checklist 90 (SCL-90). The pilot questionnaire was called the CHOPS 100 and was made available to the missionary and humanitarian coaching community. For the next 5 years, improvements were made on the basis of coaching and clinical observations.

In 2000, Cerny and David Smith submitted the assessment to international norming research and renamed it the CernySmith Adjustment Index (CSAI). The revised assessment later became known as the CernySmith Assessment (CSA).

== Research ==
Starting in 2000 Cerny and Smith researched and normed the CHOPS 100 with major changes in item content and wording. They randomized the items and then developed four sector-oriented 100 item assessment versions of the CSAI: Business/Corporate (BC), Civil/Government (CG), Humanitarian/Relief (HR), and Military (M).[4]

From February 2003 to August 2004, a total of 1,133 expatriates participated in the validation of the assessment. The average age was 42 with the range encompassing ages 13 through 77. Collectively, participants lived and worked in 130 different countries representing 46 different passport countries.[4]

Emily Hervey of Regent University provided additional validity support for the CSA in her 2009 research focused on the cultural transitions and the adjustment to college of Third Culture students.[6] In 2010 Kathryn Rosenbush of George Washington University found the CSA to be a comprehensive measure of intercultural adjustment researching the impact of balanced family communication styles on the intercultural adjustment of employee families from a major multi-national corporation.[7] She and Maria Cseh of George Washington University published results of the study in Human Resource Development International (2012).

Keith Edwards of Rosemead Graduate School of Biola University along with Kathryn Rosenbush and Carley Dodd of Abilene Christian University conducted a 2014 analysis of CSA data. Following is the abstract from their yet unpublished research article titled Development of CSA Expatriate Adjustment Measures. The manuscript is in the submission process for peer review and publication. The abstract reads:

"This study reports a psychometric analysis of the CernySmithTM Adjustment Survey (CSA) developed for use with expatriate workers and family members. The CSA was designed to measure expatriate worker adjustment on 20 scales in 5 content domains (Organizational, Cultural, Relational, Resilience, and Foundational). The present study reports a revision of the CSA based on data from 1,133 employees of non-profit and business organizations in 130 host countries from 46 passport countries. The analyses were conducted in 3 phases. First, uni-dimensionality of each a priori content scale was established using Principle Components Analyses. Then, Cronbach’s alpha reliability coefficients were calculated for each scale. Second, Principle Components Analyses were conducted to examine the discriminate validity of the scale items within each of the 5 domains. Finally, a second-order principle components analysis of the 15 scales scores identified 3 broad domains of adjustment identified as Work Management, Relationship Management, and Self-Management. The content and psychometric structure of the CSA are discussed in light of the three primary scales of expatriate employee adjustment identified by Black et al. (1991) and the four couple and spouse adjustment scales identified by Brown (2008). The authors suggest that the CSA has the potential of increasing the robustness of expatriate adjustment assessment (Hippler et al., 2014) with the addition of the resilience (well-being, past stresses, and focus) and personal foundation (spirituality, health, and habits) domains."

== See also ==
- Holmes and Rahe Stress Scale
- Myers-Briggs Type Indicator
- Keirsey Temperament Sorter
- Strong Interest Inventory
- FIRO-B
- DISC assessment

== References and further reading ==
- Hervey, E. (2009). Cultural Transitions During Childhood and Adjustment to College. Journal of Psychology and Christianity, 28(1). Retrieved April 26, 2012.
- Rosenbusch, K. (2010). Cross-cultural Adjustment Process of Expatriate Families in a Multinational Organization: A Family System Theory Perspective (PDF) (Doctoral thesis).
- Gaining a Deeper Understanding of Cross-Cultural Adjustment Stresses Retrieved April 26, 2012.
- CSAI Codebook Retrieved April 26, 2012.
- Stevenson, G. (2008, August). August 2008 ICF-OC Insights. In International Coach Federation (ICF) Orange County Chapter. Retrieved May 8, 2012.
- Cerny, L., Smith, D., Ritschard, H., & Dodd, C. (2008). Development of the CernySmith Assessment (CSA) as an Integrative Cross-Cultural Adjustment Assessment. Retrieved April 26, 2012.
- Cerny, L., Smith, D., Ritschard, H., & Dodd, C. (2007, March 29). The CSAI: An Expatriate On-field Adjustment Index to Measure Intercultural Intelligence. Retrieved April 26, 2012.
- Cerny, L., Smith, D., Ritschard, H., & Dodd, C. (2007, October 31). The CSAI: Research and Development of an Intercultural Expatriate Coaching Assessment. Retrieved April 26, 2012.
