= Ramani Durvasula =

American psychologist, media expert, and author

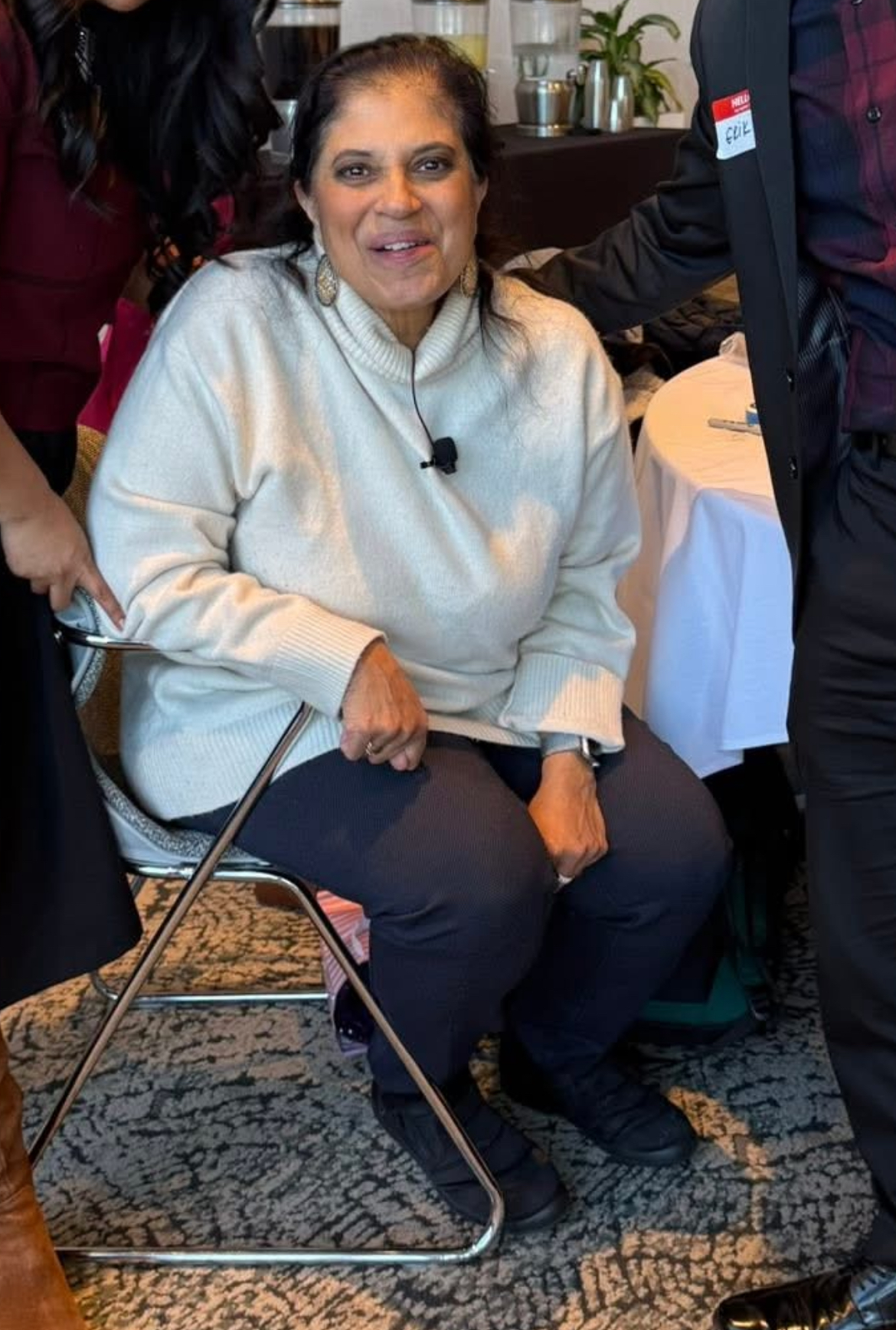
- Ramani Durvasula 2026
- Born: Ramani Suryakantham Durvasula; Englewood, New Jersey, U.S.
- Occupations: Psychologist; professor; author; public speaker

YouTube information
- Channel: DoctorRamani
- Years active: 2011–present
- Genres: Personal development, mainly topics involving narcissistic abuse
- Subscribers: 1.95 million
- Views: 277 million
- Last updated: 13 June 2025

Ramani Suryakantham Durvasula (born December 30, 1965) is an American clinical psychologist, author, and retired professor of psychology. She has appeared on media outlets discussing narcissistic personality disorder and narcissistic abuse, including Red Table Talk, Bravo, the Lifetime Movie Network, National Geographic, and the History Channel, as well as programs such as the TODAY show and Good Morning America.

== Early life ==
Ramani Suryakantham Durvasula was born in Englewood, New Jersey.

== Education ==
In 1989, Durvasula obtained a Bachelor of Science in Psychology from the University of Connecticut. She has also received a Master of Arts in Psychology and a Doctor of Philosophy (PhD) in Clinical Psychology from the University of California, Los Angeles (UCLA) in 1997.

== Career ==
Durvasula has a private practice in Santa Monica and another in Sherman Oaks, Los Angeles. She is also Professor of Psychology at California State University, Los Angeles, and a visiting professor of psychology at the University of Johannesburg. Her books include It's Not You: Identifying and Healing from NARCISSISTIC People, “Don’t You Know Who I Am”: How to Stay Sane in the Era of Narcissism, Entitlement and Incivility, Should I Stay or Should I Go: Surviving a Relationship With a Narcissist, and You Are WHY You Eat: Change Your Food Attitude, Change Your Life, as well as peer-reviewed journal articles, book chapters, and conference papers.

Durvasula first appeared on television on an episode of Remote Control. She was the co-host of the show My Shopping Addiction on the Oxygen network, and has provided commentary on the TODAY show and Good Morning America. Channels such as Bravo, the Lifetime Movie Network, National Geographic, the History Channel, Discovery Science, and Investigation Discovery have also featured her. In the Fall of 2010, she appeared in the Bravo series “Thintervention,” where she led group therapy sessions to help six participants find out the source of their overeating. She is co-host of the podcast Sexual Disorientation. She has been interviewed on internet media platforms as well, notably MedCircle and TONE Network. She has spoken at TEDx Sedona and South by Southwest. At the American Psychological Association, she was on the Committee on Socioeconomic Status from 2014 to 2017 (serving as president in 2016), and is a member of the advisory board of the Minority Fellowship Program. The National Institutes of Health has funded her research on personality disorders; they approved a $1.5 million grant for her to study the link between HIV and mental illness. The four-year study, that included 288 patients, determined that 92 percent of participants had experienced depression, substance use disorder, or another Axis-I disorder, and that nearly half met criteria for at least one Axis-II disorder (e.g. antisocial personality disorder, borderline personality disorder, or narcissistic personality disorder).

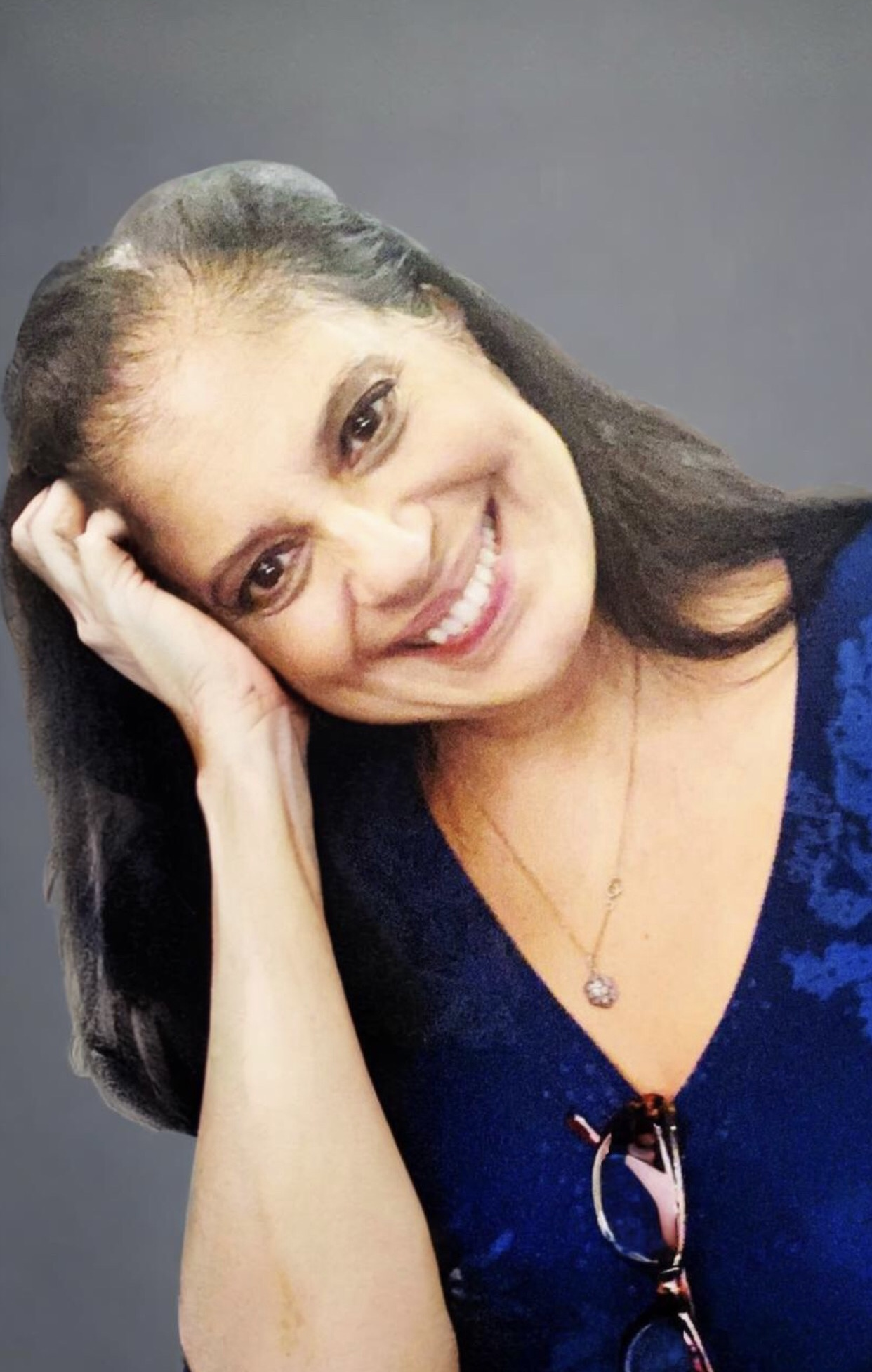
Ramani Durvasula

== Accolades ==
In 2003, Durvasula received the “Emerging Scholar” Award from the American Association of University Women and the “Distinguished Woman” Award from the CSULA. California State University named her Outstanding Professor of the year in 2012.

== Personal life ==
Dr. Ramani moved to Los Angeles in 1991. On August 31, 1996, she became a Professor-in-Residence in the Department of Psychiatry and Biobehavioral Sciences at UCLA School of Medicine. The couple had two daughters, but separated in 2008 and divorced the following year. After the divorce, Durvasula raised their daughters on her own. She is in a relationship with Richard Wearn.

In an interview discussing contraception, Durvasula said that she began struggling with her weight in her mid-20s. After having children, the pressure of juggling her career and personal life led her to find "comfort" in food. She faced unkindness from the other mothers at her daughters' school, who were mostly slim. When preparing for a wedding, she found that none of the saris her mother had brought from India fit her. Determined to lose weight, she began to go on daily walks and eat smaller portions. Within just over a year, she lost 32.5 kg.

In an interview with Steven Bartlett, she disclosed that she was sexually assaulted and later stalked while at university, an ordeal that ultimately led her to leave the university.

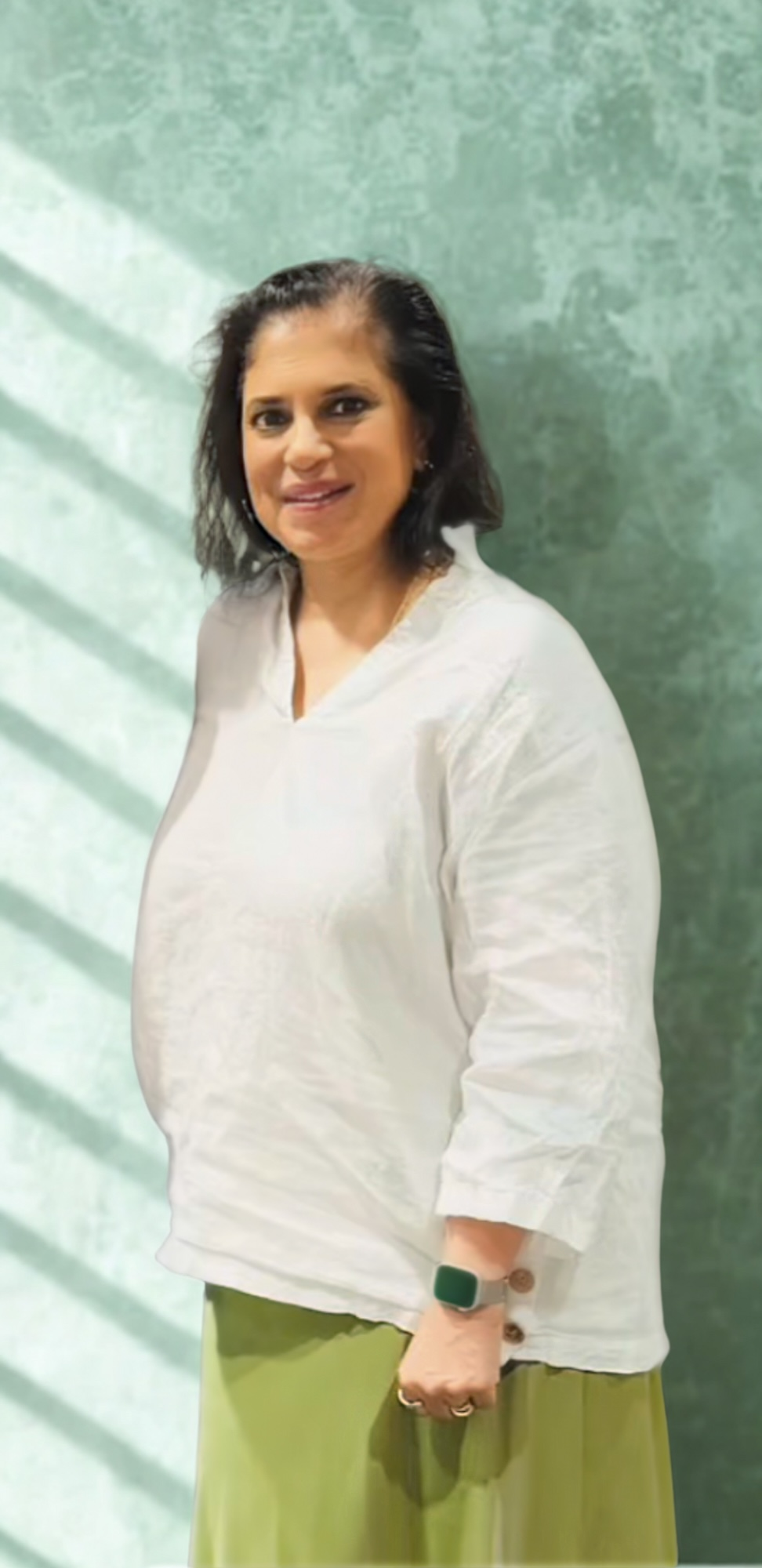
Ramani Durvasula

== Filmography ==
- Thintervention (2010)
- Ted Talk (2018) – "Narcissism and Its Discontents" (Guest)
- Red Table Talk (2019) – "The Narcissism Epidemic" (Guest)
- The Today Show (2020) – "How to Prepare for a Healthy Divorce" (Guest)
- The Today Show (2020) – "Relationship Expert Offers Advice to Couples in Quarantine" (Guest)
- Red Table Talk (2020) – "Managing Our Anxiety & Fear During COVID-19" (Guest)
- Oxygen's Snapped (2020) – "Notorious: Hollywood Ripper" (Guest)

== Podcasts ==
- Sexual Disorientation with Dr. Ramani (2017–present) (Host)
- The Psych Central Show – (2018) "Why Does the Narcissist Always Get the Girl?" (Guest)
- The Psych Central Show – (2018) "Help! My Coworker Is a Narcissist!" (Guest)
- LAHWF (2018) – "Chatting with an Expert on Narcissism"
- Being Well with Dr. Rick Hanson (2019) – "How to Deal with a Narcissist" (Guest)
- Speaking of Psychology (2019) – "Recognizing a Narcissist" (Guest)
- Progress Notes (2019) "Sharing Your Expertise in the Media" (Guest)
- Mental Illness Happy Hour with Paul Gilmartin (2019) "Narcissists and Psychopaths" (Guest)
- On Purpose with Jay Shetty (2020) – "How To Cope With Feelings Of Uncertainty & Grief During A Pandemic" (Guest)
- H.E.R. Space Podcast (2020) – "Raised By A Narcissist: Signs, Symptoms, and How to Recover" (Guest)
- Teddi Tea Pod With Teddi Mellencamp (2020) – "Don’t Fall In Love with a Narcissist" (Guest)
- Negotiate Your Best Life (2020) – "Do's and Don'ts of Negotiating with a Narcissist" (Guest)
- Cleaning Up the Mental Mess (2020) — "Navigating Narcissistic Relationships, How the Culture of Entitlement is Making the Pandemic Worse + Why We Are So Interested in Stories About Psychopaths with Psychologist Dr. Ramani Durvasula" (Guest)
- Zestology (2020) — "Dr. Ramani Durvasala on Narcissism #292" (Guest)

== Bibliography ==
=== Papers ===
- Durvasula, Ramani Suryakantham; Mylvaganam, Gaithri A. (April 1994). "Mental health of Asian Indians: Relevant issues and community implications". Journal of Community Psychology. 22 (2): 97–108. doi:10.1002/1520-6629(199404)22:2<97::AID-JCOP2290220206>3.0.CO;2-#.
- Durvasula, Ramani S.; Myers, Hector F.; Mason, Karen; Hinkin, Charles (February 16, 2007). "Relationship between Alcohol Use/Abuse, HIV Infection and Neuropsychological Performance in African American Men". Journal of Clinical and Experimental Neuropsychology. 28 (3): 383–404. doi:10.1080/13803390590935408. PMC 2891502. PMID 16618627.
- Regan, Pamela C.; Durvasula, Ramani S. (November 30, 2008). "Predictors of Breast Cancer Screening in Asian and Latina University Students". College Student Journal. 42 (4): 1152–1161. ISSN 0146-3934.
- Durvasula, Ramani S.; Miller, Eric N.; Myers, Hector F.; Wyatt, Gail E. (August 9, 2010). "Predictors of Neuropsychological Performance in HIV Positive Women". Journal of Clinical and Experimental Neuropsychology. 23 (2): 149–163. doi:10.1076/jcen.23.2.149.1211. PMID 11309669. S2CID 40914548.
- Durvasula, Ramani; Miller, Theodore R. (2014). "Substance Abuse Treatment in Persons with HIV/AIDS: Challenges in Managing Triple Diagnosis". Behavioral Medicine. 40 (2): 43–52. doi:10.1080/08964289.2013.866540. ISSN 0896-4289. PMC 3999248. PMID 24274175.
- Durvasula, R (August 4, 2014). "HIV/AIDS in older women: unique challenges, unmet needs". Behavioral Medicine. 40 (3): 85–98. doi:10.1080/08964289.2014.893983. PMC 4152459. PMID 25090361.
- Regan, Pamela C.; Durvasula, Ramani S. (December 18, 2015). "A Brief Review of Intimate Partner Violence in the United States: Nature, Correlates, and Proposed Preventative Measures". Interpersona: An International Journal on Personal Relationships. 9 (2): 127–134. doi:10.5964/ijpr.v9i2.186.
- Durvasula, Ramani S.; Regan, Pamela C.; Ureño, Oscar; Howell, Lisa (August 31, 2016). "Frequency of Cervical and Breast Cancer Screening Rates in a Multi-Ethnic Female College Sample". Psychological Reports. 99 (2): 418–420. doi:10.2466/pr0.99.2.418-420. PMID 17153810. S2CID 7260351.
- Durvasula, Ramani S.; Halkitis, Perry N. (July 3, 2017). "Delineating the Interplay of Personality Disorders and Health". Behavioral Medicine. 43 (3): 151–155. doi:10.1080/08964289.2017.1337400. ISSN 0896-4289. PMC 6134178. PMID 28767019.
- Durvasula, Ramani S. (August 2, 2017). "Personality Disorders and Health: Lessons Learned and Future Directions". Behavioral Medicine. 43 (3): 227–232. doi:10.1080/08964289.2017.1337403. PMC 6139668. PMID 28767011.
- Durvasula, R; Kelly, J; Schleyer, A; Anawalt, BD; Somani, S; Dellit, TH (April 2018). "Standardized Review and Approval Process for High-Cost Medication Use Promotes Value-Based Care in a Large Academic Medical System". American Health & Drug Benefits. 11 (2): 65–73. PMC 5973244. PMID 29915640.

=== Books ===
- You Are WHY You Eat: Change Your Food Attitude, Change Your Life (January 1, 2013)
- Should I Stay or Should I Go: Surviving A Relationship with a Narcissist (October 24, 2017)
- Mothers, Daughters, and Body Image: Learning to Love Ourselves as We Are (October 31, 2017) – with Hillary L. McBride
- Don’t You Know Who I Am: Staying Sane in an Era of Narcissism, Entitlement and Incivility (2019)
- It's Not You: Identifying and Healing from Narcissistic People (2024)
