= Autogenic training =

Relaxation technique

- MeSH: D001326

Autogenic training is a relaxation technique first published by the German psychiatrist Johannes Heinrich Schultz in 1932. The technique involves repetition of a set of visualisations accompanied by vocal suggestions that induce a state of relaxation and is based on passive concentration of bodily perceptions like heaviness and warmth of limbs, which are facilitated by self-suggestions. Autogenic training is used to alleviate many stress-induced psychosomatic disorders.

== History ==
Autogenic training (AT) was first presented by German psychiatrist Johannes Heinrich Schultz in 1926 to a medical society in Berlin. Disenchanted with psychoanalysis in the 1920s, Schultz began exploring new therapeutic methods. His search was heavily influenced by his experience with German neurologist Oscar Vogt, with whom he researched sleep and hypnosis. Collecting data about hypnosis in his research with Vogt, Schultz found that the hypnotized often felt a feeling of heaviness in the extremities, as well as a feeling of pleasant warmth. Interested in this relationship, Schultz investigated whether imagining such heaviness and warmth in the limbs could lead to self-hypnosis. Under his guidance, Schultz's patients were able to go into a hypnotic state for a self-determined period of time by simply imagining a state of heaviness and warmth in their limbs. These short-term mental exercises appeared to reduce stress or effects such as fatigue and tension while avoiding side effects such as headaches. Inspired by this research and Vogt's work, Schultz became interested in the phenomenon of autosuggestion. He wanted to explore an approach to relaxation that would avoid the undesirable passivity of the patients and dependency on the therapist. To this end, Schultz developed a set of six exercises called autogenic training.

Autogenic training was popularized in North America and the English-speaking world by Wolfgang Luthe, a German physician who worked under Schultz and investigated its effects on physical and mental health. Later on, when Luthe immigrated to Canada, he wrote about autogenic training in English, thereby introducing the English-speaking world to AT. With help from Schultz, Luthe published Autogenic Therapy, a multi-volume text that described AT in detail, in 1969. The publication of Autogenic Therapy brought AT to North America. Later on, his disciple Luis de Rivera, a McGill University-trained psychiatrist, introduced psychodynamic concepts into Luthe's approach, developing autogenic analysis as a new method for uncovering the unconscious.

More recently, in 2015, biofeedback practitioners have integrated basic elements of autogenic imagery and developed simplified versions of parallel techniques used in combination with biofeedback. This was done at the Menninger Foundation by Elmer Green, Steve Fahrion, Patricia Norris, Joe Sargent, Dale Walters and others. They incorporated the hand-warming imagery of autogenic training and used it as an aid in developing thermal biofeedback.

== Technique ==
Autogenic training can be practiced in any comfortable posture, while keeping eyes closed. In autogenic training, the trainees engage in passive concentration. Passive concentration refers to concentrating on inner sensations rather than environmental stimuli.

The technique consists of six standard exercises according to Schultz:

1. Muscular relaxation by repetition of a verbal formula, "My right arm is heavy", emphasizing heaviness. During the initial stages of the training, the feeling of heaviness in the trained arm is more expressed and occurs more rapidly. The same feeling can be experienced in the other extremities at the same time in the other arm. Within a week, a short concentration can trigger the sensation of heaviness in a trainee's arms and legs.
2. Passive concentration focuses on feeling warm, initiated by the instruction "My right arm is warm".
3. Initiation of cardiac activity using the formula "My heartbeat is calm and regular".
4. Passive concentration on the respiratory mechanism with the formula "It breathes me".
5. Concentration on the warmth in the abdominal region with "My solar plexus is warm" formula.
6. Passive concentration on coolness in the cranial region with the formula "My forehead is cool".

When a new exercise step is added in autogenic training, the trainee should always concentrate initially on the already learned exercises and then add a new exercise. In the beginning, a new exercise is added for only brief periods.

According to the specific clinical needs, the training can be modified to include fewer formulas, or include a slightly different formula.

== Benefits ==
The main benefit of autogenic training is the autonomic self-regulation achieved by removing environmental distraction, training imagery that accompanies autonomic self-regulation, and providing a facilitative set of exercises that are easy to learn and remember.

A study by Laci Spencer suggests that autogenic training restores the balance between the activity of the sympathetic (flight or fight) and the parasympathetic (rest and digest) branches of the autonomic nervous system. The author hypothesizes that this can have important health benefits, as the parasympathetic activity promotes digestion and bowel movements, lowers the blood pressure, slows the heart rate, and promotes the functions of the immune system.

A meta-analysis study by Friedhelm and Kupper found that autogenic training was effective in reducing symptoms of anxiety, depression, and insomnia. Additionally, autogenic training was found to have a positive effect on physical health outcomes, such as reducing pain and improving quality of life for individuals with chronic illnesses. They also found that AT was also effective in the following psychosomatic disorders: mild-to-moderate hypertension, coronary heart disease, Raynaud's disease, and tension headache and migraine.

== Biological aspects ==
There is a lack of neurophysiological investigations addressing this topic; however, one EEG study from 1963 suggested that the decrease in afferent stimulation induces a reduction in reticulo-cortical activity, decrease in thalamo-cortical activity, and functional changes in the structures connected to reticular system (hypothalamus, limbic system, red nucleus, globus pallidus). The same study suggested that EEG patterns obtained from subjects with different level of practice are not similar.

Another study from 1958 hypothesized that autogenic state is between the normal waking state and sleep. It suggests that EEG patterns occurring during autogenic training are similar to electrophysiological changes occurring during initial stages of sleep.

== Contraindications ==
Autogenic training is contra-indicated for children below the age of 5 and the individuals whose symptoms cannot be controlled.

== Applications ==
Autogenic training has different applications and is used in a variety of pathophysiological conditions, such as bronchial asthma or hypertension, as well as psychological disorders e.g. anxiety and depression. Autogenic training has been subject to clinical evaluation from its early days in Germany, and from the early 1980s worldwide. In 2002, a meta-analysis of 60 studies was published in Applied Psychophysiology and Biofeedback, finding significant positive effects of treatment when compared to normals over a number of diagnoses; finding these effects to be similar to best recommended rival therapies; and finding positive additional effects by patients, such as their perceived quality of life. Autogenic training is recommended in the 2016 European Society of Cardiology Guideline for prevention of cardiovascular disease in persons who experience psychosocial problems. The International Journal of Dermatology conducted a study and found that Autogenic Training was potentially helpful for improving aged skin in women experiencing menopause.

== Compared to other relaxation techniques ==
The principle of passive concentration in autogenic training makes this technique different from other relaxation techniques such as progressive muscle relaxation and biofeedback, in which trainees try to control physiological functions. As in biofeedback, bidirectional change in physiological activity is possible. Autogenic training is classified as a self-hypnotic technique. It is different from hetero-hypnosis, where trance is induced by another individual. Autogenic training emphasizes a trainee's independence and gives control from therapist to the trainee. By this, the need for physiological feedback devices or a hypnotherapist is eliminated.

== See also ==
- Affirmations – Practice of positive thinking and self-empowerment
- Autosuggestion – Psychological technique related to the placebo effect
- Progressive muscle relaxation – Muscle relaxation technique
- Qigong – Chinese system of coordinated posture and movement, breathing, and meditation
- Suggestion – Psychological process of guiding a person
- The Relaxation Response – 1975 book by Herbert Benson
- Yoga nidra – State of consciousness between waking and sleeping
