= Wolfgang Luthe =

German physician and psychotherapist

Wolfgang Luthe (1922-1985) was a German physician and psychotherapist, who brought autogenic training to the attention of the English-speaking world.

His contributions to autogenic training, and collaboration over several decades with JH Schultz, its founder, sometimes result in Luthe being credited as one of the originators of the method. Luthe's writing and training courses championed the method as a therapeutic modality in several diseases.

== Early career ==
Luthe was born in 1922 in Lübeck. He received his M.D. degree in Hamburg in 1947. As a junior trainee, he met JH Schultz, who was the founder of autogenic training (AT), a system of self-hypnosis, which was confined to Germany and Austria before and during World War Two. Luthe was impressed by the effects of AT in asthma and became Schultz's protégé. Their collaboration continued throughout Schultz's lifetime, despite Luthe emigrating to Canada in the late 1940s.

He was in clinical practice in Montreal. As a member of the International Institute of Stress, founded by Hans Selye, he demonstrated the stress-reduction effects of autogenic exercises. He taught at both Université de Montreal and McGill University, including the psychology and the psychiatry postgraduate training programs.

== Writing ==
His first book, Autogenic Training: A Psychophysiologic Approach in Psychotherapy, jointly authored with Schultz, appeared in 1959. This was based on Schulz's 1932 book, and its subsequent updates, available only in German. It was the first book-length presentation of autogenic training in English. A six-volume series, Autogenic Therapy followed; the first three volumes were coauthored with Schultz; the last three were written independently following Schultz's death. His numerous publications included journal articles and a training manual.

== Other ==
In Luthe's view, social conditioning interferes with what the body and mind do naturally when in distress; off-loading exercises enhance the autogenic process by using body and mind awareness to acknowledge and accept, and then to manage emotional release safely and constructively. Accordingly, natural homeostatic mechanisms regulate not only physiological processes, for example fluid and electrolyte balance and temperature, but functional disorders of a cognitive or emotional nature. He considered autogenic techniques a means of stimulating and better applying the natural homeostatic mechanisms of the brain.

He contributed a number of innovations of his own to autogenic therapy, such as techniques of autogenic neutralization, autogenic abreaction, autogenic verbalization, and intentional off-loading exercises. He encouraged autogenic training as a therapeutic modality in several diseases. In 1961, he described the therapeutic significance of "autogenic discharges", which had been considered to be mere "training symptoms" or side effects of basic autogenic training.

He assisted in the formation of the International Committee for Autogenic Training and Therapy (ICAT). His training center at Lac du Deux Montagnes, near Montreal, attracted international students like Malcolm Carruthers, founder of the British Autogenic Society, and José Luis González de Rivera, founder of the Asociacion Española de Psicoterapia. He frequently visited Japan, where he was scientific director of the Oskar Vogt Institute and visiting professor at the Kyushu University School of Medicine and Hospital.

== Late career ==
In the 1970s, he worked on methods to mobilize individual creativity, as described in his 1976 book, Creativity Mobilization Technique.

In 1979, Luthe moved to Vancouver, British Columbia. He continued clinical work and writing, and was associated with Simon Fraser University. He was involved in the application of autogenic methods to competitive athletics. At the time of his death, he was preparing a German edition of Autogenic Therapy, as well as writing a biography of Oskar Vogt, the Berlin neurologist and brain researcher, who, around the turn of the 20th century, had made observations on autohypnosis that were pivotal in Schultz's formulation of the autogenic standard exercises.
