= Holmes and Rahe Stress Scale =

Psychological scale

The Holmes and Rahe Stress Scale (/reɪ/), also known as the Social Readjustment Rating Scale, is a list of 43 stressful life events that can contribute to illness. The test works via a point accumulation score which then gives an assessment of risk. The American Institute of Stress, for instance, regards a score of 300 or more as an "80% chance of health breakdown within the next 2 years". While there is good evidence that chronic stress can lead to ill health, there is not much evidence to support the ranking of stressful life events in this manner.

== Development ==
In 1967, psychiatrists Thomas Holmes and Richard Rahe examined the medical records of over 5,000 medical patients as a way to determine whether stressful events might cause illnesses. Patients were asked to tally a list of 43 life events based on a relative score. A positive Correlation and dependence correlation of 0.118 was found between their life events and their illnesses.

Their results were published as the Social Readjustment Rating Scale (SRRS), known more commonly as the Holmes and Rahe Stress Scale. Subsequent validation has supported the links between stress and illness.

== Subsequent research ==
Rahe carried out a study in 1970 testing the validity of the stress scale as a predictor of illness. The scale was given to 2,500 US sailors and they were asked to rate scores of 'life events' over the previous six months. Over the next six months, detailed records were kept of the sailors' health. There was a +0.118 correlation between stress scale scores and illness, which was sufficient to support the hypothesis of a link between life events and illness.

In conjunction with the Cornell medical index assessing, the stress scale correlated with visits to medical dispensaries, and the H&R stress scale's scores also correlated independently with individuals dropping out of stressful underwater demolitions training due to medical problems. The scale was also assessed against different populations within the United States (with African, Mexican and White American groups). The scale was also tested cross-culturally, comparing Japanese and Malaysian groups with American populations.

A 1975 article in Journal of Human Stress (Behavioral Medicine) by psychologist David Mechanic noted the Holmes stress inventory had proved useful but also identified several limitations, including:

- Lack of differentiation between favorable versus adverse life events
- Ambiguity of life events described
- Confounding dependent and independent variables
- Lack of specificity in items listed

== Adults ==
The sum of the life change units of the applicable events in the past year of an individual's life gives a rough estimate of how stress affects health.

Life event	Life change units
Death of a spouse	100
Divorce	73
Marital separation	65
Imprisonment	63
Death of a close family member	63
Personal injury or illness	53
Marriage	50
Dismissal from work	47
Marital reconciliation	45
Retirement	45
Change in health of family member	44
Pregnancy	40
Sexual difficulties	39
Gain a new family member	39
Business readjustment	39
Change in financial state	38
Death of a close friend	37
Change to different line of work	36
Change in frequency of arguments	35
Major mortgage	32
Foreclosure of mortgage or loan	30
Change in responsibilities at work	29
Child leaving home	29
Trouble with in-laws	29
Outstanding personal achievement	28
Spouse starts or stops work	26
Beginning or end of school	26
Change in living conditions	25
Revision of personal habits	24
Trouble with boss	23
Change in working hours or conditions	20
Change in residence	20
Change in schools	20
Change in recreation	19
Change in church activities	19
Change in social activities	18
Minor mortgage or loan	17
Change in sleeping habits	16
Change in number of family reunions	15
Change in eating habits	15
Vacation	13
Major holiday	12
Minor violation of law	11

Score of 300+: At risk of illness.

Score of 150-299: Risk of illness is moderate (reduced by 30% from the above risk).

Score < 150: Slight risk of illness.

== Non-adults ==
A modified scale has also been developed for non-adults. Similar to the adult scale, stress points for life events in the past year are added and compared to the rough estimate of how stress affects health.

Life event	Life change Units
Death of parent	100
Unplanned pregnancy/abortion	100
Getting married	95
Divorce of parents	90
Acquiring a visible deformity	80
Fathering a child	70
Jail sentence of parent for over one year	70
Marital separation of parents	69
Death of a brother or sister	68
Change in acceptance by peers	67
Unplanned pregnancy of sister	64
Discovery of being an adopted child	63
Marriage of parent to stepparent	63
Death of a close friend	63
Having a visible congenital deformity	62
Serious illness requiring hospitalization	58
Failure of a grade in school	56
Not making an extracurricular activity	55
Hospitalization of a parent	55
Jail sentence of parent for over 30 days	53
Breaking up with boyfriend or girlfriend	53
Beginning to date	51
Suspension from school	50
Becoming involved with drugs or alcohol	50
Birth of a brother or sister	50
Increase in arguments between parents	47
Loss of job by parent	46
Outstanding personal achievement	46
Change in parent's financial status	45
Accepted at college of choice	43
Being a senior in high school	42
Hospitalization of a sibling	41
Increased absence of parent from home	38
Brother or sister leaving home	37
Addition of third adult to family	34
Becoming a full-fledged member of a church	31
Decrease in arguments between parents	27
Decrease in arguments with parents	26
Mother or father beginning work	26

Score of 300+: At risk of illness.

Score of 150-299: Risk of illness is moderate. (reduced by 30% from the above risk)

Score < 150: Slight risk of illness.

== See also ==
- Life-Events and Difficulties Schedule
- Diathesis–stress model
- CernySmith Assessment

Medical:

- Allostatic load
- Hypothalamic–pituitary–adrenal axis
- Psychoneuroimmunology
