= Richard A. Murphy =

American neuroscientist (1944–2022)

- Born: May 20, 1944; Revere, Massachusetts, U.S.
- Died: March 24, 2022 (aged 77); La Quinta, California, U.S.
- Education: College of the Holy Cross (BA); Northeastern University (MS); Rutgers University (PhD)
- Scientific career
- Fields: Neuroscience
- Workplaces: Harvard Medical School; University of Alberta; McGill University; Salk Institute; California Institute for Regenerative Medicine

Richard A. Murphy (May 20, 1944 – March 24, 2022) was an American neuroscientist. He was the director of the Montreal Neurological Institute (1992–2000), president and CEO of the Salk Institute for Biological Studies (2000–2007), and president of the California Institute for Regenerative Medicine (2007–2008).

== Early life and education ==
Murphy was born on May 20, 1944, in Revere, Massachusetts. He graduated from the College of the Holy Cross with a Bachelor of Arts degree in 1966. He then earned a Master of Science (M.S.) from Northeastern University in 1970 and his Ph.D. from Rutgers University in 1974.

== Career ==
Murphy began his career as a neuroscientist and professor at Harvard Medical School, where he taught from 1974 to 1986. He immigrated with his family in 1986 to Edmonton, Alberta, and became the chair of the Department of Anatomy and Cell Biology at the University of Alberta. In 1992, Murphy was named Director of the Montreal Neurological Institute at McGill University, where he expanded the faculty by 20 members and led an effort to establish the Brain Tumour Research Centre. The centre was eventually established in 1999, being the first Canadian centre devoted to researching the cause of brain tumors.

In 2000, Murphy became the president and CEO of the Salk Institute for Biological Studies, where he remained until 2007. He raised $160 million in funding for the organization and founded research in multiple fields there. Murphy was also the president of the California Institute for Regenerative Medicine from 2007–2008. His primary research was in neurotrophins, a protein produced by brain cells and the peripheral nervous system.

== Personal life and death ==
Murphy was known colloquially as "Rich". He was married to Elaine (née Finnegan) Murphy, with whom he had three children: Jane, Mark, and Alison. He died on March 24, 2022, at age 77.
