= Donald Baxter =

Canadian neurologist (1926–2012)

Donald W. Baxter (August 24, 1926 – July 24, 2012) was a Canadian neurologist Emeritus Professor in the Department of Neurology and Neurosurgery at McGill University and former Director of the Montreal Neurological Institute and Hospital. He graduated from Queen's University and trained at McGill University Health Centre, Kingston General Hospital and Boston City Hospital. In 1962, he became Associate Professor of Neurology at McGill University and was later chairman of the institute's Neurology and Neurosurgery Departments. Between 1984 and 1992 he was MNI Director; a role he continued in the capacity of Interim Director from 2000-2002. In 1996 he was named an Officer of the Order of Canada.

Baxter was President of the Canadian Neurological Association (1969–1970) and an Officer, Order of Canada (1995).
