= Barbara E. Jones =

Canadian neuroscientist

Barbara E. Jones FRSC (Dec 19, 1944 - July 22, 2022) was an American-Canadian neuroscientist whose research concerns the chemical and neurological basis for the circadian alternation between sleep and wakefulness. Jones has been described as "a central contributor to our understanding of the brain basis of REM sleep". She was a professor emerita in the McGill University Department of Neurology and Neurosurgery, associated with the Montreal Neurological Institute and Hospital.

== Education and career ==
Jones was a student at the University of Delaware, earning a bachelor's degree in psychology in 1966, a master's degree in physiological psychology in 1969, and a Ph.D. in physiological psychology in 1971.

She joined the McGill University faculty as a professor in the Department of Neurology and Neurosurgery at the Montreal Neurological Institute and Hospital in 1977. During her career, Jones studied how the brain generates waking and sleep states using immunohistochemical and neuroanatomical techniques combined with neurophysiological recording, and optogenetics. Amongst many important findings, Jones identified the modulatory action of cholinergic neurons on cortical activation, the influence of inhibitory GABA neurons on sleep states and the activity of hypocretins/orexins neurons as key regulators of waking and narcolepsy with cataplexy in humans and animals.

== Recognition ==
Jones was elected as a Fellow of the Royal Society of Canada in 2010.

The Montreal Neurological Institute and Hospital held a symposium on sleep in 2021, in honour of Jones's career and retirement.
