= David Colman =

American neuroscientist

David R. Colman (January 4, 1949 – June 1, 2011) was an American neuroscientist who served as Director of the Montreal Neurological Institute and Hospital at McGill University and McGill University Health Centre until his death in June 2011.

== Education ==
Colman graduated from Bronx High School of Science. He received a Bachelor of Science (Biology) with minors in English and Geology from New York University (1970) and a Ph.D. in Neuroscience from the State University of New York Downstate Medical Center (1977).
