= Johannes Heinrich Schultz =

German psychiatrist (1884–1970)

- Born: 20 June 1884
- Died: 19 September 1970 (aged 86)
- Occupations: Psychiatrist, psychotherapist

Johannes Heinrich Schultz (20 June 1884 – 19 September 1970) was a German psychiatrist and psychotherapist. Schultz is known for the development of autogenic training.

== Life ==
He studied medicine in Lausanne, Göttingen (where he met Karl Jaspers) and Breslau. He earned his doctorate from Göttingen in 1907. After receiving his medical license in 1908, he practiced at the polyclinic at the Medical University Clinic at Göttingen until 1911. Afterwards he worked at the Paul-Ehrlich Institute in Frankfurt, at the insane asylum at Chemnitz and finally at the Psychiatric University Clinic at Jena under Otto Binswanger, where he earned his habilitation in 1915.

During the First World War, he served as director of a sanitorium in Belgium. In 1919 he became a professor of Psychiatry and Neuropathology at Jena. In 1920 he became Chief Doctor and scientific leader at Dr. Heinrich Lahmann's sanatorium Weisser Hirsch in Dresden. In 1924, he established himself as a psychiatrist in Berlin.

From 1925-26 he was a member of the founding committee for the first General Doctors' Congress for Psychotherapy, board member of the General Medical Society for Psychotherapy (established in 1927). From 1928 he advised the organization's newsletter, and after 1930 he co-edited (with Arthur Kronfeld and Rudolf Allers) the journal, now named the Zentralblatt für Psychotherapie. In 1933 he became a board member of the renamed German Medical Society for Psychotherapy under Matthias Heinrich Göring and from 1936 under this vice-director a board member of the German Institute for Psychological Research and Psychotherapy (Deutsches Institut für psychologische Forschung und Psychotherapie) as well as director of the polyclinic.

== Nazi Period ==
In 1933 he began research on his guidebook on sexual education, Geschlecht, Liebe, Ehe, in which he focused on homosexuality and explored the topics of sterilization and euthanasia. In 1935 he published an essay titled Psychological consequences of sterilization and castration among men, which supported compulsory sterilization of men in order to eliminate hereditary illnesses. Soon after he was appointed deputy director of the Göring Institute in Berlin, which was the headquarters of the Deutsches Institut für psychologische Forschung und Psychotherapie (German institute for psychological research and psychotherapy).

Through this institute, he had an active role in the extermination of mentally handicapped individuals in the framework of the Aktion T4 program.

There he began to test many of his theories on homosexuality. Schultz strongly believed that homosexuality generally was not hereditary and that most homosexuals became so through perversion. He stated on numerous occasions that homosexuals displayed "scrubby and stunted forms of personality development". Consequently, he also believed that homosexuality was curable through intense psychotherapy. During his time at the Göring Institute, 510 homosexuals were recorded to have received numerous psychotherapeutic treatments and 341 were deemed to be cured by the end of the treatments. Most of his subjects were convicted homosexuals brought in from concentration camps. After treating his patients, Schultz tested the treatments' effectiveness by forcing them to have sex with prostitutes. In a case study he later released, in which he briefly discussed the process of determining whether a young SS soldier, who had been sentenced to death for homosexual acts, was 'cured', Schultz stated: "Those who were considered incurable were sent back to the concentration camps, but 'cured' homosexuals, such as the previously mentioned SS soldier, were pardoned and released into military service". In this way Schultz actually saved numerous accused homosexuals from the hellish life of a concentration camp but he stated later that "successfully treated subjects were sent to the front, where they most probably were killed in action".

After the war, the Göring Institute was disbanded but Schultz faced no repercussions for his more dubious research and methods during the past decade. In fact he released a case study on his work with homosexuals in 1952 titled Organstörungen und Perversionen im Liebesleben, in which he admitted to the inhumanity of some of his experiments but also still supported their results. In fact he continued to support his findings and even continued to advocate paragraph 175 for the rest of his life.

In 1956, he became editor of the journal Psychotherapie, and in 1959 founder of the German Society for Medical Hypnosis (Deutschen Gesellschaft für ärztliche Hypnose).

== Autogenic training ==
Schultz's most famous achievement was the development of autogenic training, that was based on the hypnosis research and self-experimentation. It was first publicly put forward in 1926 as "autogenic organ exercises", and received its current name in 1928. The program consists of a set of six mental exercises that target specific bodily reactions that are believed to underpin body-mind health. It is a myth that autogenic training is a technique based on creative visualisations. Rather, it is a technique that revolves around a set of sub-vocal instructions to different parts of the body with the trainee simply observing in a completely non-striving way the changes in the way the body feels. It is a passive process, unlike creative visualisations, which rely upon a more active cognitive state. Today, because of Schultz' contribution to body-mind health, autogenic training is practiced worldwide. NASA teaches AT to their astronauts to help them with the psychophysiological stressors of space travel. In Australia, UK, Italy and Spain AT is taught to assist with problems such as stress, anxiety, depression, anger management, insomnia, fatigue and for difficulties with concentration, memory, decision making amongst other things. In Japan and Germany, medical practices teach AT to assist with the treatment of a wide range of medical complaints. The Autogenic Training Institute of Australia teaches AT for occupational health and safety and has become well known for its work with the mining, oil and gas industry as well as police.

== Writings ==
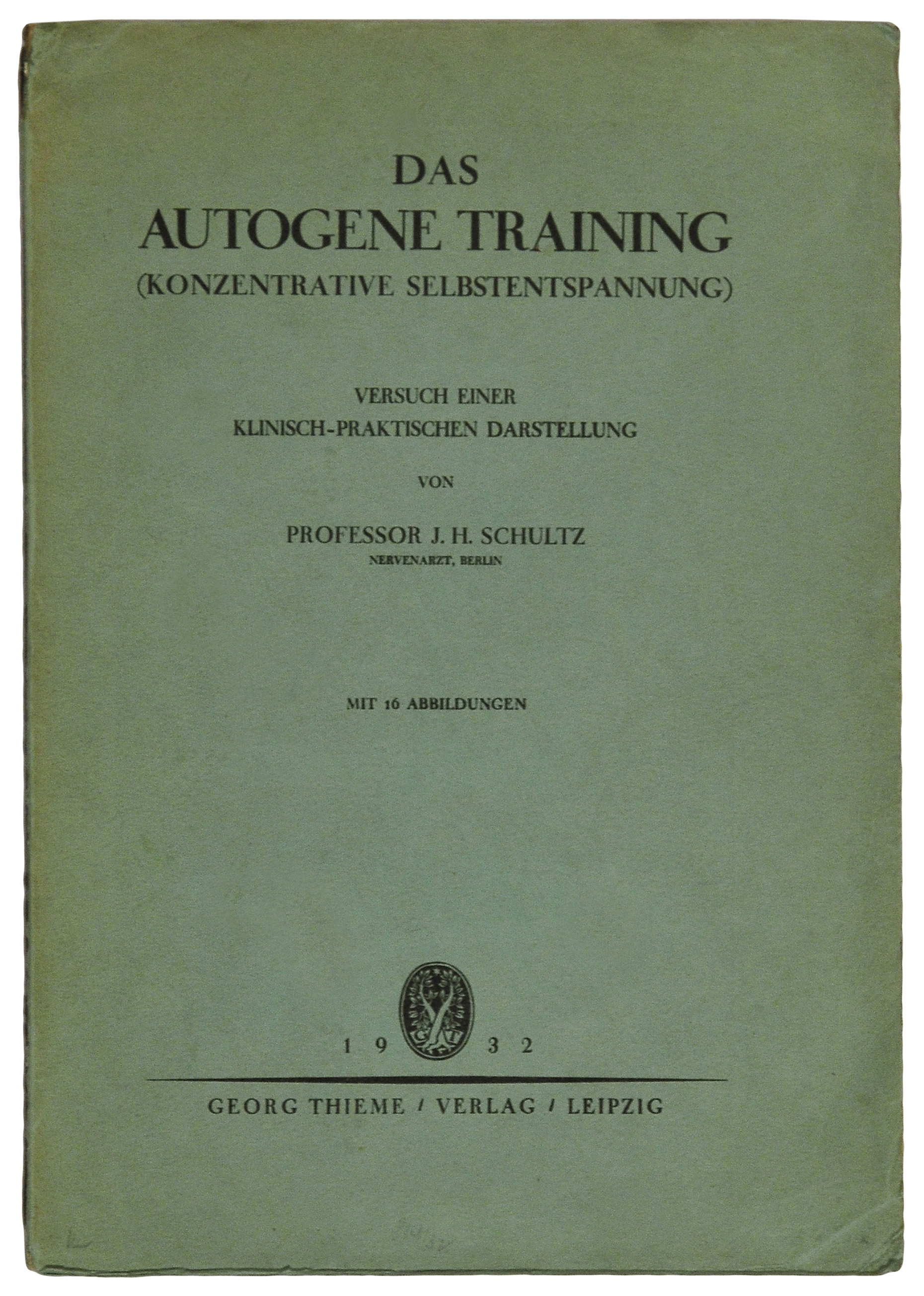
First edition of "Das Autogene Training (konzentrative Selbstentspannung)" (1932)

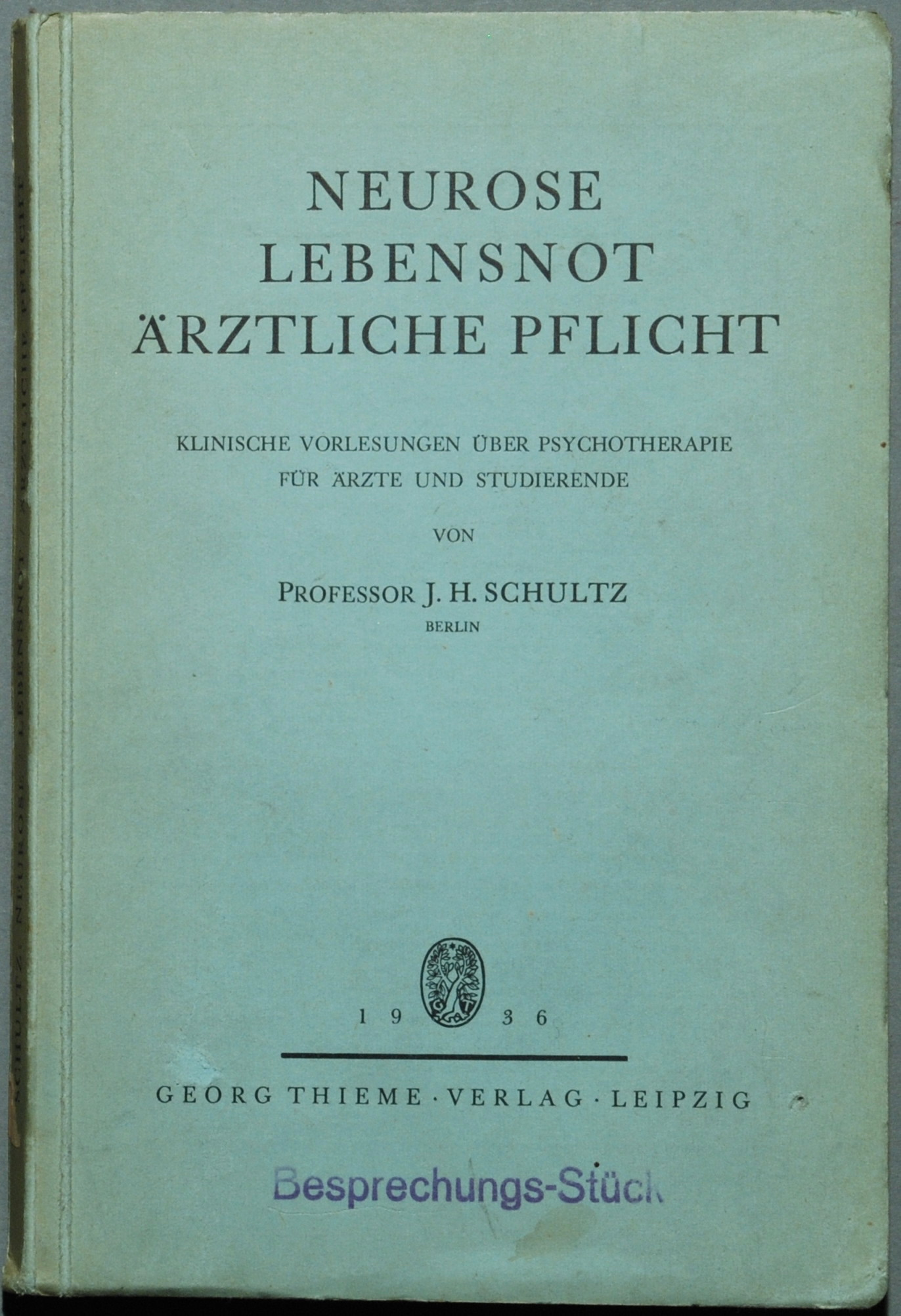
First edition of "Neurose Lebensnot ärztliche Pflicht" (1936)

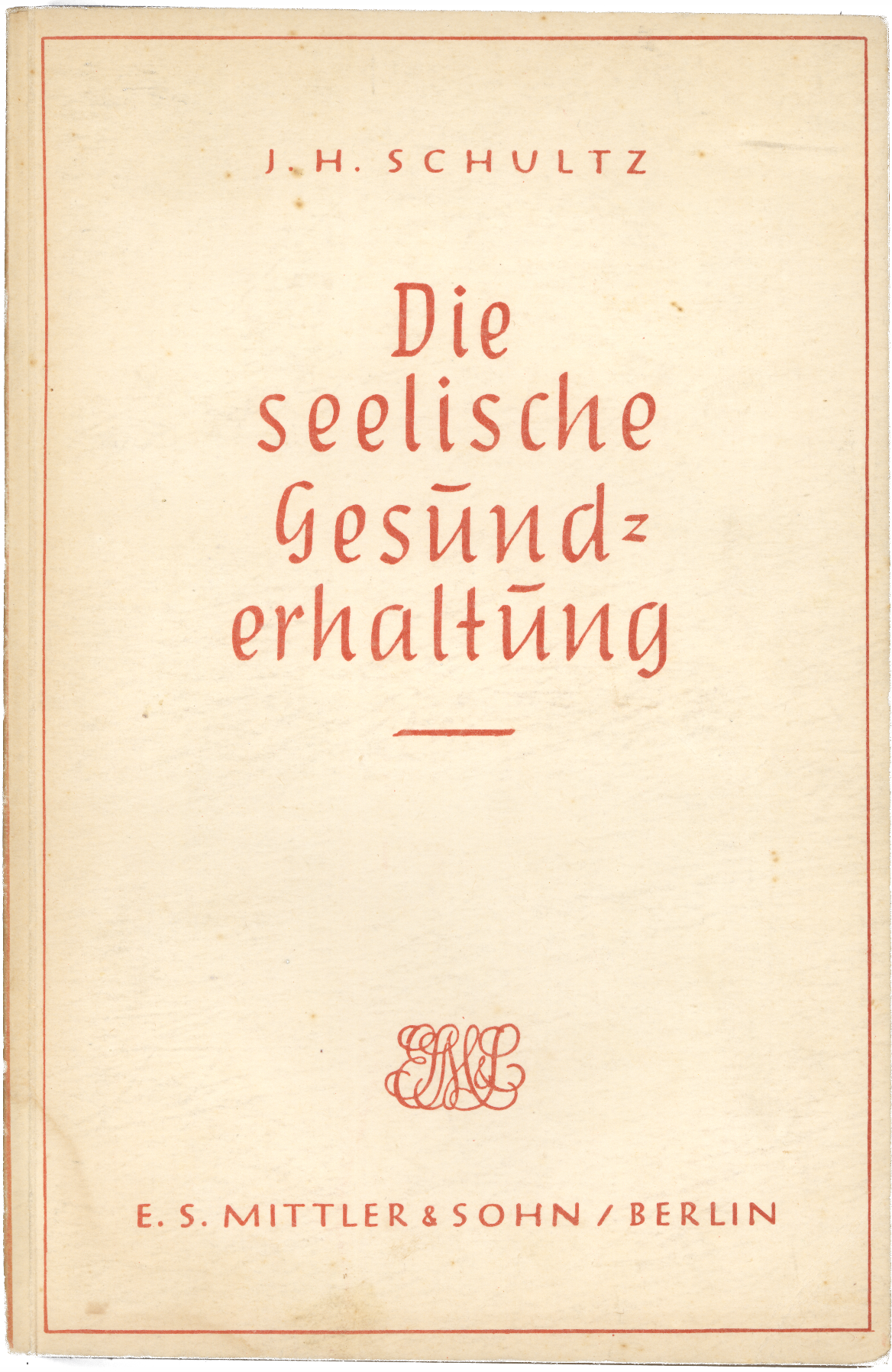
Die Seelische Gesunderhaltung, 1941

- (1915) "Neue Wege und Ziele der Psychotherapie" Ther. Monatshefte 29, pp. 443–450 (habilitation thesis).
- (1919) "Die seelische Krankenbehandlung (Psychotherapie)." Ein Grundriß für Fach- und Allgemeinpraxis. Jena: Fischer, seven editions. Stuttgart: Thieme, 1958.
- (1921) "Psychoanalyse und ihre Kritik." In: Adam, C. (ed.): Die Psychologie und ihre Bedeutung für die ärztliche Praxis. Eight editions. Jena: Fischer.
- (1925) "Schicksalsstunde der Psychotherapie." In: Moll, Albert (ed.): Abh. Gebiet. Psychother. med. Psychol. 1.
- (1927) "Die Einigungsbestrebungen in der Psychotherapie." In: Eliasberg, Wladimir (ed.): Bericht über den I. Allgemeinen Kongreß für Psychotherapie in Baden-Baden. 17.-19. April 1926. Halle: Carl Marhold Verlagsbuchhandlung, pp. 241–252.
- (1932) "Das Autogene Training (konzentrative Selbstentspannung)." Versuch einer klinisch-praktischen Darstellung. Leipzig: Thieme, many editions.
- (1935) "Hypnose-Technik." Praktische Anleitung zum Hypnotisieren für Ärzte. Jena: Fischer.
- (1935) Ubungsheft fur das Autogene Training (konzentrative Selbstentspannung). Leipzig: Thieme, many editions.
- (1936) "Neurose Lebensnot ärztliche Pflicht." Klinische Vorlesungen über Psychotherapie für Ärzte und Studierende. Leipzig: Thieme.
- (1940) "Geschlecht - Liebe - Ehe." Die Grundtatsachen des Liebes- und Geschlechtslebens in ihrer Bedeutung für Einzel- und Volksdasein. Munich: Reinhardt, seven editions.
- (1941) Die seelische Gesunderhaltung unter besonderer Berücksichtigung der Kriegsverhältnisse. E.S. Mittler & Sohn, Berlin
- (1951) Bionome Psychotherapie. Stuttgart: Thiema.
- (1952) "Organstörungen und Perversionen im Liebesleben." Bedeutung, Entstehung, Behandlung, Verhütung. Munich: Reinhardt.
- (1952) "Psychotherapie." Leben und Werk großer Ärzte. Stuttgart: Hippokrates.
- (1955) "Grundfragen der Neurosenlehre." Aufbau und Sinn-Bild. Propädeutik einer medizinischen Psychologie. Stuttgart: Thieme.
- (1964) Lebensbilderbuch eines Nervenarztes - Jahrzehnte in Dankbarkeit. Stuttgart: Thieme, second edition 1971.
