= Barbara Jones (astronomer) =

Infrared astronomer

Barbara Jones is an infrared astronomer. She is a professor emerita at the University of California, San Diego.

== Education and career ==
In the early 1970s, Jones worked with David Aitken at University College London in the Physics and Astronomy Department, formed in 1972 from the merger of two separate departments. She completed her Ph.D. there in 1977, under the supervision of Benjamin Michael Zuckerman, and was affiliated with the University of Minnesota before joining the University of California, San Diego in 1980.

== Research ==
Jones's early work included infrared astronomy of Jupiter, of planetary nebulae, and of the Galactic Center. Her dissertation was Infrared spectral observations of the galactic centre and other celestial objects. The research from later in her career included the development of a mid-infrared spectrometer for the W. M. Keck Observatory, and its use to observe the Einstein Cross, a gravitationally lensed quasar.

== Recognition ==
Jones was elected as a Fellow of the American Physical Society (APS) in 1994, after a nomination from the APS Division of Astrophysics, "for pioneering development of state-of-the-art infrared instrumentation, the design of the next generation of large telescopes, and their use to make forefront observations of infrared sources".
