= Symptom Checklist 90 =

- Purpose: measures progress of psychiatric treatment

The Symptom Checklist-90-R (SCL-90-R) is a relatively brief self-report psychometric instrument (questionnaire) published by the Clinical Assessment division of the Pearson Assessment & Information group. It is designed to evaluate a broad range of psychological problems and symptoms of psychopathology. It is also used in measuring the progress and outcome of psychiatric and psychological treatments or for research purposes.

According to the overview given by the publisher, the SCL-90-R is normed on individuals 13 years and older. It consists of 90 items and takes 12–15 minutes to administer, yielding nine scores along primary symptom dimensions and three scores among global distress indices. The primary symptom dimensions that are assessed are somatization, obsessive-compulsive, interpersonal sensitivity, depression, anxiety, hostility, phobic anxiety, paranoid ideation, psychoticism, and a category of "additional items" which helps clinicians assess other aspect of the clients symptoms (e.g. item 19, "poor appetite"). The three indices are global wellness index, hardiness, and symptom free. A high number of studies have been conducted demonstrating the reliability, validity, and utility of the instrument. It is one of the most widely used measures of psychological distress in clinical practice and research. The Spanish adaptation was made by Luis de Rivera, MD.
