= Barbara A. Jones =

American physicist

Barbara A. Jones Ph.D.
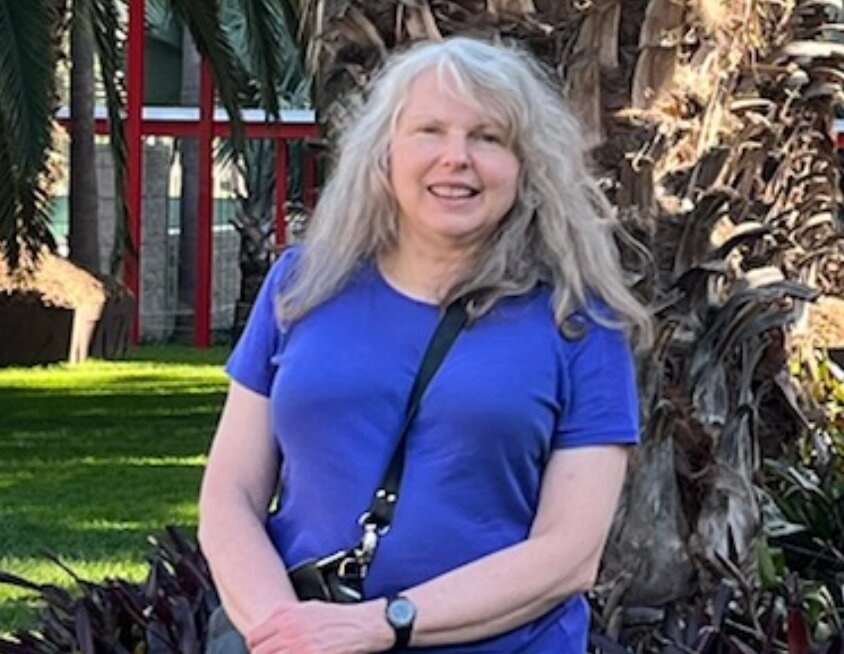
- Dr. Barbara A. Jones in 2023
- Born: May 28, 1960
- Died: September 24, 2024
- Citizenship: U.S.A.
- Education: Harvard University, Cornell University
- Known for: quantum dynamics, High-temperature superconductivity
- Scientific career
- Workplaces: IBM Research
- Thesis: (1988)
- Doctoral advisor: John Wilkins, Chandra Varma

Barbara A. Jones (May 28, 1960 – September 24, 2024) was an American physicist who worked for IBM Research in San Jose, California, in the Quantum Applications group of IBM Quantum. Her research involved the quantum dynamics of magnetic systems.

== Education and career ==
After graduating from Harvard College in 1982, Jones went to the University of Cambridge as a Churchill Scholar to study for Part III of the Mathematical Tripos, earning a master's degree there. She completed a Ph.D. at Cornell University in 1988, with research on the Kondo model of quantum impurities supervised by John Wilkins of Cornell and Chandra Varma of Bell Labs.

She became a postdoctoral researcher at Harvard with Bertrand Halperin, working on High-temperature superconductivity, before joining IBM Research in 1989.

== Recognition ==
Jones was elected as a Fellow of the American Physical Society (APS) in 2002, after a nomination from the APS Division of Condensed Matter Physics, "for outstanding contributions to theories of impurity magnetism and spin transport in magnetic nanostructures". She has chaired the APS Forum on Industrial Applications of Physics, the APS Division of Condensed Matter Physics, and the APS Committee on the Status of Women in Physics.

She was also a Fellow of the American Association for the Advancement of Science (AAAS), and had chaired the physics section of the AAAS.
