= William Feindel =

Canadian neurosurgeon (1918–2014)

- Born: William Howard Feindel; July 12, 1918; Bridgewater, Nova Scotia
- Died: January 12, 2014 (aged 95); Montreal, Quebec
- Education: Acadia University; Dalhousie University; McGill University; Merton College, Oxford
- Scientific career
- Fields: Neurosurgery
- Workplaces: Montreal Neurological Institute

William Howard Feindel OC GOQ FRSC (July 12, 1918 – January 12, 2014) was a Canadian neurosurgeon, scientist and professor.

Born in Bridgewater, Nova Scotia, he received a B.A. in Biology from Acadia University in 1939, a M.Sc. from Dalhousie University in 1942, and an M.D., C.M. from McGill University in 1945. Attending Merton College, Oxford as a Rhodes Scholar he received his D. Phil in 1949.

After completing his residency, Feindel was in neurosurgical practice for two years with Wilder Penfield at the Montreal Neurological Institute. In 1955 he founded the Neurosurgical Department at the University Hospital in Saskatoon.

In 1959 Feindel re-joined the Montreal Neurological Institute where he founded the William Cone Laboratory for Neurosurgical Research and became the first William Cone Professor of Neurosurgery and then Director of the MNI from 1972 to 1984. During this tenure he led a clinical neuroscience team to acquire the first CAT and combined MRI/S units in Canada and to develop the world's first PET system utilizing a prototype Japanese "Baby" cyclotron and the MNI-designed BGO crystal PET scanner for detecting brain tumours and stroke. He integrated these systems into a Brain Imaging Center (BIC), within a major extension of the MNI, opened in 1984 and since then recognized as a leading world center for clinical diagnosis, teaching and research in neuro-imaging.

In the early 1950s, during brain mapping studies with Penfield and Jasper, Feindel discovered the role of the amygdala in patients with temporal lobe seizures, which, with related studies at the MNI, led to the operation of antero-mesial temporal lobe resection often referred to as "the Montreal procedure", an operation adopted worldwide for the surgical cure of many thousands of patients with epilepsy.

Feindel was curator of the Wilder Penfield Archive. He was the Chancellor of Acadia University from 1991 to 1996 and then Honorary Governor. In 1998 he was elected Honorary Osler Librarian by the Board of Curators of the Osler Library of the History of Medicine at McGill University. At the 2005 Neuro Convocation, he was given a Lifetime Achievement Award of the Montreal Neurological Institute. He was Senior Consultant in Neurosurgery and Professor of Neurology and Neurosurgery, McGill University and Director of the Neuro-History Project at the Montreal Neurological Institute.

He died at the Montreal Neurological Institute after a brief illness.

== Honours ==
- In 1963 he received an honorary DSc from Acadia University.
- In 1973 he was elected Fellow of the Royal Society of Canada.
- In 1982 he was made an Officer of the Order of Canada.
- In 1983 he received an honorary LLD from Mt Allison University.
- In 1984 he received an honorary D.Sc from McGill University.
- In 1989 he was awarded an honorary Doctor of Laws from the University of Saskatchewan.
- In 2002 he was made a Grand Officer of the National Order of Quebec.
- In 2003 he was inducted into the Canadian Medical Hall of Fame.
- In 2004 he was inducted into L'Academie des Grand Montrealais.
