= Behavioral Medicine (journal) =

- Discipline: Behavioral sciences, medicine
- Language: English
- Edited by: Perry N. Halkitis

Publication details
- Former name(s): Journal of Human Stress
- History: 1975–present
- Publisher: Taylor & Francis
- Frequency: Quarterly
- Impact factor: 2.344 (2018)

Standard abbreviations
- ISO 4: Behav. Med.

Indexing
- ISSN: 0896-4289 (print); 1940-4026 (web)
- OCLC no.: 768946975

Links
- Journal homepage; Current Issue; Online Archives

Behavioral Medicine is an interdisciplinary medical journal published by Taylor & Francis, addressing the interactions of the behavioral sciences with other fields of medicine. Before Spring 1988 (Vol. 14, No. 1), the journal's previous title was Journal of Human Stress (ISSN 2374-9741), which was published from March 1975 (Vol. 1) through Winter 1987 (Vol. 13). As of 2020, the editor is Perry N. Halkitis (Rutgers University).

The journal is indexed in: Applied Social Science Index and Abstracts; Behavioral Medicine Abstracts; BIOMED; Current Contents/Clinical Medicine; Current Contents/Social & Behavioral Sciences; EMBASE/Excerpta Medica; Family Resources Database; Health Instrument File; Index Medicus / MEDLINE; International Bibliography of Book Reviews (IBR); International Bibliography of Periodical Literature; National AIDS Information Clearinghouse; NIOSHTIC; Psychological Abstracts / PsycINFO; Research Alert; Scisearch; and Social Sciences Citation Index / Journal Citation Reports.
