= Barbara Jones (diplomat) =

Irish diplomat

Ambassador of Ireland to Mexico
- Incumbent
- Assumed office September 2017

Personal details
- Born: Ireland
- Occupation: Diplomat

Barbara Jones is an Irish diplomat who, as of September 2017, serves as ambassador of Ireland to Mexico, in which capacity she is also the named ambassador to Cuba, El Salvador, Costa Rica, Nicaragua, Venezuela, Colombia, and Peru.
