= Montreal Neurological Institute and Hospital =

The Montreal Neurological Institute-Hospital
- McGill University Health Centre
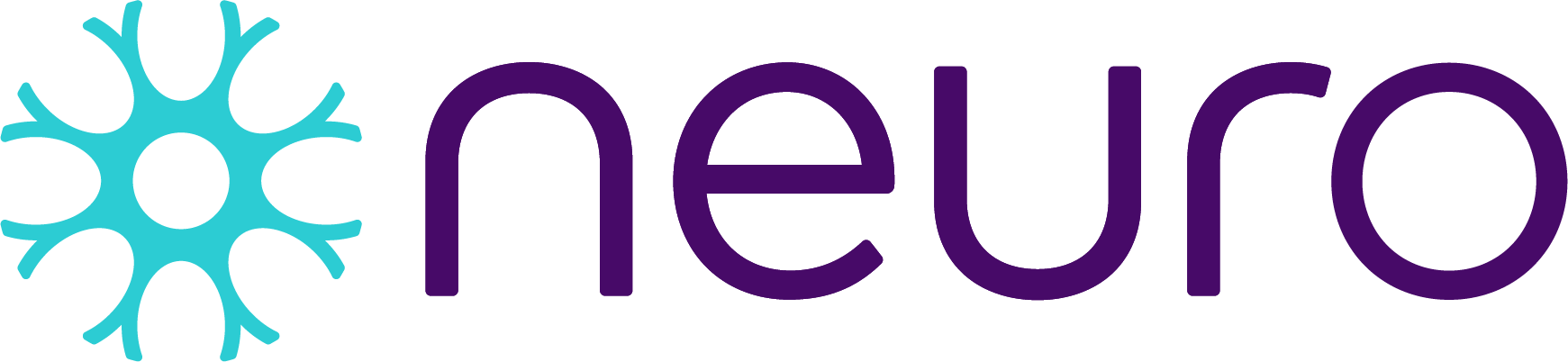

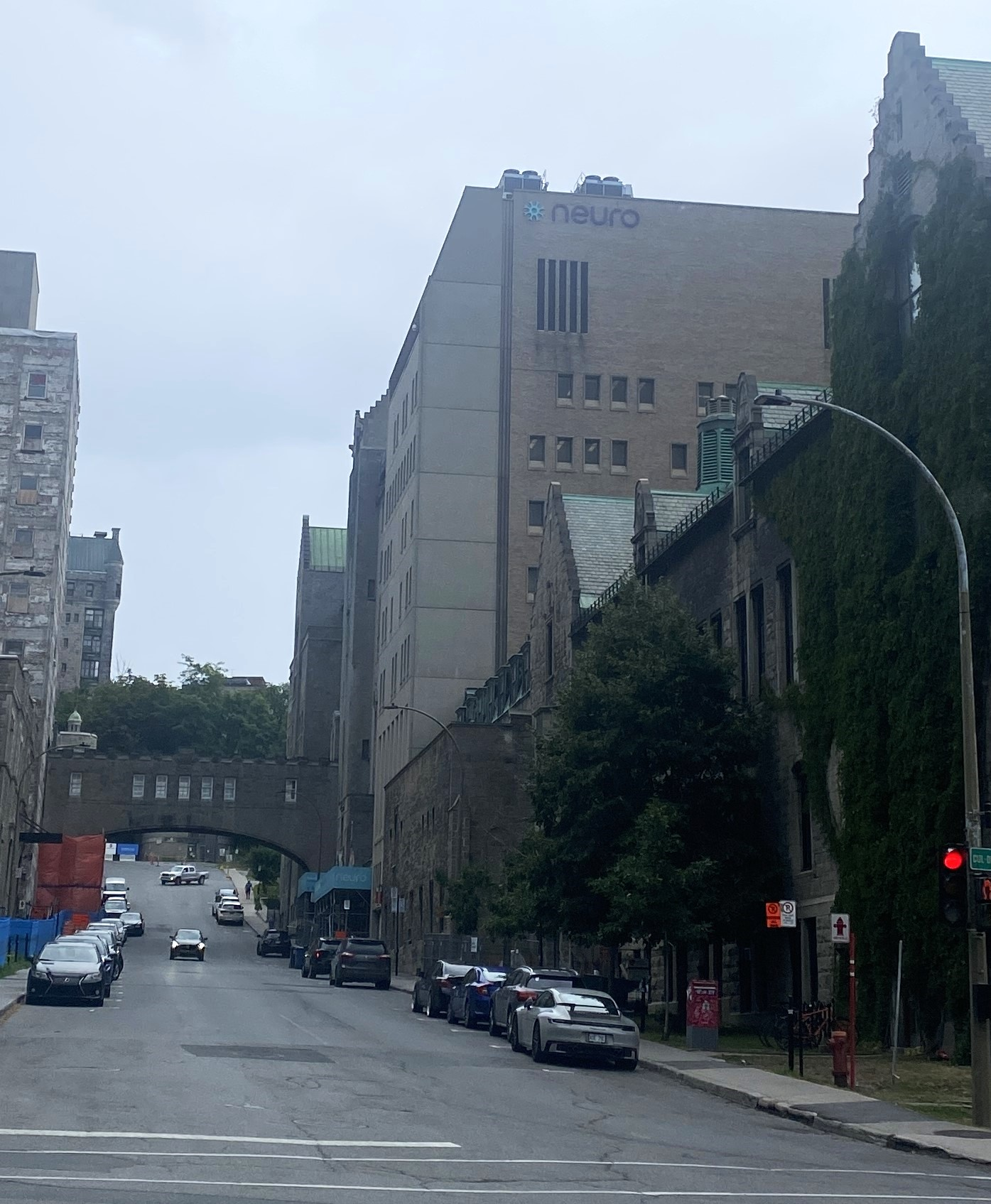
- View of The Neuro from the corner of Pine Avenue and University Street

Geography
- Location: 3801, rue University; Montreal, Quebec; H3A 2B4
- Coordinates: 45°30′32″N 73°34′52″W

Organisation
- Care system: Public (RAMQ)
- Type: Teaching, Research
- Affiliated university: McGill University
- Network: McGill University Health Centre

Services
- Beds: 85

History
- Founded: 1934

Links
- Website: www.mcgill.ca/neuro/

The Neuro (Montreal Neurological Institute-Hospital) is a bilingual academic healthcare institution in Montreal, Quebec, Canada. It is part of the McGill University Health Centre network. As a research and medical centre dedicated to neuroscience, The Neuro delivers high-quality patient care, advances research, and trains future healthcare professionals.

The Neuro is located on University Street, just north of Pine Avenue, on the southern slope of Mount Royal.

== History ==
The Neuro was founded in 1934 by neurosurgeon Wilder Penfield, who developed the Montreal treatment of epilepsy there. The Neuro originated from the sub-department of Neurosurgery at the Royal Victoria Hospital (RVH) and was originally located at what is now called the RVH Legacy Site. In 1933, construction began on a new building on University Street that would house The Neuro. On September 27, 1934 Sir Edward Beatty, chancellor of McGill University, declared the institute formally opened.

The Rockefeller Foundation provided funds to build and equip the laboratories of the institute and created an endowment fund of $1.2M in support of the scientific work of the Department of Neurology and Neurosurgery. The clinical, or hospital, part of the institute was built through donations from private individuals. The Province of Quebec and the City of Montreal agreed to be responsible for the hospital’s yearly operation.

At the end of Penfield’s foundation address, he expressed the hope that the institute would act as a catalyst for Canadian neurology: "We dare to hope that this is the inauguration of an institute of medicine that is characteristically Canadian, the birth of a Canadian School of Neurology."

The Neuro is a Killam Institution, supported by the Killam Trusts. In 1966, the Izaak Walton Killam Memorial Endowment Fund and Fund for Advanced Studies were established through the bequest of Dorothy Johnston Killam. These funds support the academic and training mission of The Neuro.

In 2007, The Neuro launched a five-year, $40-million fundraising campaign to build a 75,000 square foot addition known as the North Wing. The new wing added space for clinics, neuroimaging, and experimental therapeutics.

== Phased plan to move The Neuro ==
Today, The Neuro’s aging facilities on University Street face major space constraints and infrastructure challenges that limit the ability to modernize care. To ensure it can continue to meet growing clinical needs and shape neuroscience discovery, the MUHC launched a campaign in February 2026 to gather support for the relocation of The Neuro to the Glen site. The project, currently in the planning stage, would create a modern, integrated environment designed to support patient care, research and education for the future.

== Open science ==
In 2016, The Neuro became the first academic institution of its kind in the world to implement in practice the principles of open science, when The Larry & Judy Tanenbaum Family Foundation donated $20M to establish the Tanenbaum Open Science Institute.

Dr. Guy Rouleau, the former Director of The Neuro, was awarded the Canada Gairdner Wightman award in 2020, for identifying and elucidating the genetic architecture of neurological and psychiatric diseases, including ALS, autism and schizophrenia, and his leadership in the field of open science.

The Neuro's open science efforts are concentrated in four core platforms: an open biobank, an early drug discovery unit, neuroinformatics, and a peer support program.

== McConnell Brain Imaging Centre ==
The McConnell Brain Imaging Centre ("The BIC") is The Neuro's multimodal platform for neuroimaging and neuroinformatics research. Launched in 1984 by then Neuro director Dr. William Feindel with the support of the McConnell Family Foundation, The BIC has grown into the largest neuroimaging facility in Canada with 29 researchers, 30 staff and more than 300 trainees and research assistants. Julien Doyon is the director of the McConnell Brain Imaging Centre.

The BIC houses 3 core units: the magnetic resonance imaging (MRI) unit (jointly led by David Rudko and Christine Tardiff), the positron emission tomography (PET) unit (led by Jean-Paul Soucy) and the magnetoencephalography (MEG) unit (led by Sylvain Baillet). Researchers at the BIC have access to a 3.0 tesla (3T) MRI scanner (Siemens), the first full-body 7.0 tesla (7T) MRI scanner (Siemens) in Canada, a 275-channel CTF MEG system, electroencephalography (EEG), and transcranial magnetic stimulation (TMS), among others.

== Past and present directors ==
1. Wilder Graves Penfield, MD, 1934–1960
2. Theodore Brown Rasmussen, MD, 1960–1972
3. William Feindel, MD, 1972–1984
4. Donald Baxter, MD, 1984–1992 & 2000–2002
5. Richard A. Murphy, PhD, 1992–2000
6. David R. Colman, PhD, 2002–2011
7. Guy Rouleau, MD, PhD, 2013–2026
8. Edward Fon, MD, FRCP, 2026–present

== Research groups ==
- Cerebrovascular and Stroke
- Brain tumour
- Cognitive neuroscience
- Epilepsy
- Neuroimmunological diseases
- Neural circuits
- Neurodegenerative diseases
- Neuroimaging and neuroinformatics
- Rare neurological diseases
- Neurodevelopmental disorders

== See also ==
- Douglas Hospital
- Allen Institute
- Wilder Penfield
- Donald Hebb
- Brenda Milner
- Barbara E. Jones
