= Health technology =

Application of organized knowledge and skills to solve health problems

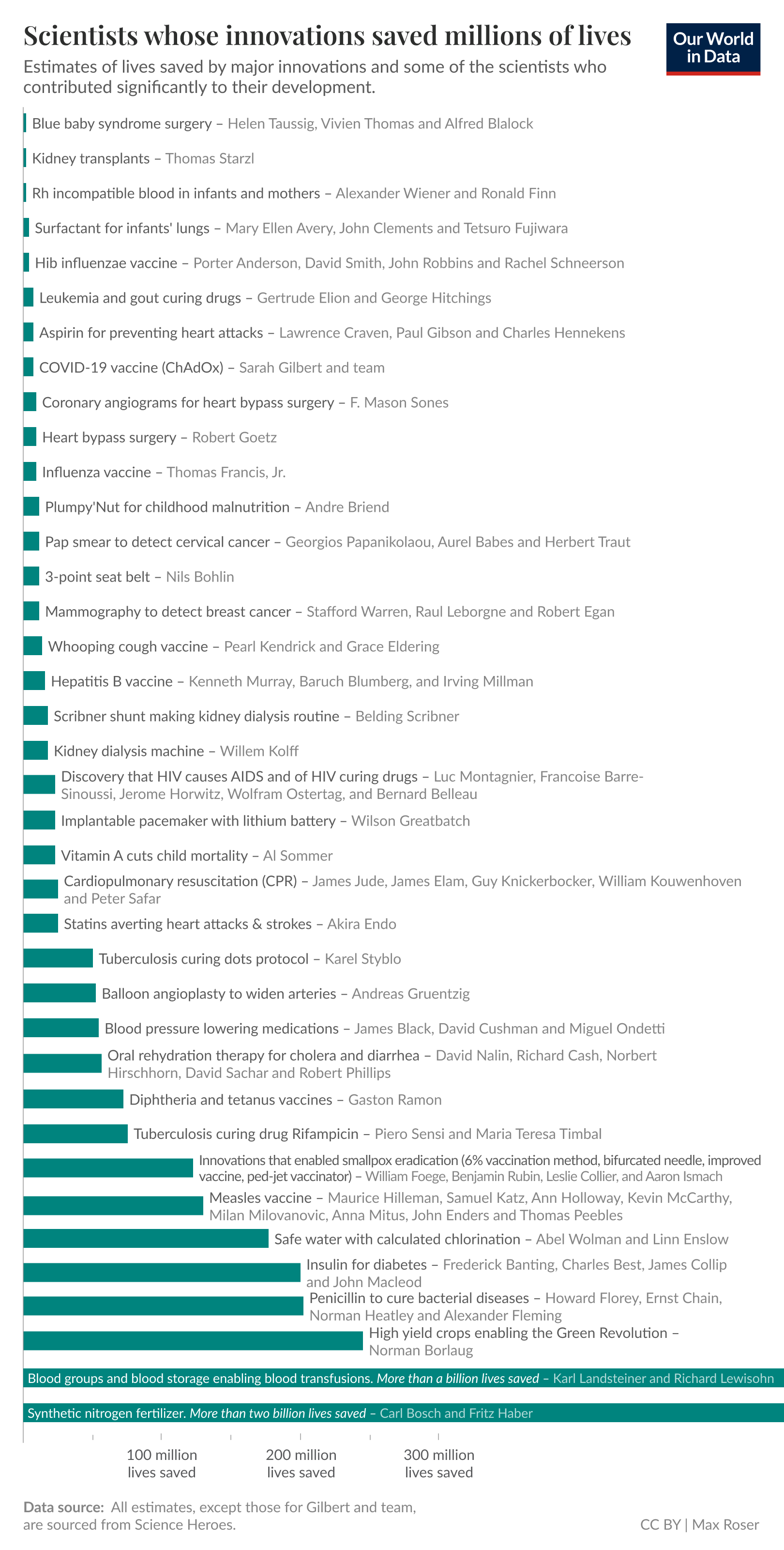
Number of lives saved by various (mostly medical) inventions

Health technology is defined by the World Health Organization as the "application of organized knowledge and skills in the form of devices, medicines, vaccines, procedures, and systems developed to solve a health problem and improve quality of lives". This includes pharmaceuticals, devices, procedures, and organizational systems used in the healthcare industry, as well as computer-supported information systems. In the United States, these technologies involve standardized physical objects, as well as traditional and designed social means and methods to treat or care for patients.

== Development ==
=== Pre-digital era ===
During the pre-digital era, patients suffered from inefficient and faulty clinical systems, processes, and conditions. Many medical errors happened in the past due to undeveloped health technologies. Some examples of these medical errors included adverse drug events and alarm fatigue. When many alarms are repeatedly triggered or activated, especially for unimportant events, workers may become desensitized to the alarms. Healthcare professionals who have alarm fatigue may ignore an alarm believing it to be insignificant, which could lead to death and dangerous situations. With technological development, an intelligent program of integration and physiologic sense-making was developed and helped reduce the number of false alarms.

Also, with greater investment in health technologies, fewer medical errors happened. Outdated paper records were replaced in many healthcare organizations by electronic health records (EHR), with adoption in the United States increasing rapidly from the late 2000s to near-universal use by the early 2020s. According to studies, this has brought many changes to healthcare. Drug administration has improved, healthcare providers can now access medical information easier, provide better treatments and faster results, and save more costs.

=== Improvement ===
To help promote and expand the adoption of health information technology, Congress passed the HITECH act as part of the American Recovery and Reinvestment Act of 2009. HITECH stands for Health Information Technology for Economic and Clinical Health Act. It gave the department of health and human services the authority to improve healthcare quality and efficiency through the promotion of health IT. The act provided financial incentives or penalties to organizations to motivate healthcare providers to improve healthcare. The purpose of the act was to improve quality, safety, efficiency, and ultimately to reduce health disparities.

One of the main parts of the HITECH act was setting the meaningful use requirement, which required EHRs to allow for the electronic exchange of health information and to submit clinical information. The purpose of HITECH is to ensure the sharing of electronic information with patients and other clinicians are secure. HITECH also aimed to help healthcare providers have more efficient operations and reduce medical errors. The program consisted of three phases. Phase one aimed to improve healthcare quality, safety and efficiency. Phase two expanded on phase one and focused on clinical processes and ensuring the meaningful use of EHRs. Lastly, phase three focused on using Certified Electronic Health Record Technology (CEHRT) to improve health outcomes.

In 2014, the implementation of electronic records in US hospitals rose from a low percentage of 10% to a high percentage of 70%.

At the beginning of 2018, healthcare providers who participated in the Medicare Promoting Interoperability Program needed to report on Quality Payment Program requirements. The program focused more on interoperability and aimed to improve patient access to health information.

=== Privacy of health data ===
Phones that can track one's whereabouts, steps and more can serve as medical devices, and medical devices have much the same effect as these phones. According to one study, people were willing to share personal data for scientific advancements, although they still expressed uncertainty about who would have access to their data. People are naturally cautious about giving out sensitive personal information. Phones add an extra level of threat. Mobile devices continue to increase in popularity each year. The addition of mobile devices serving as medical devices increases the chances for an attacker to gain unauthorized information.

In 2015 the Medical Access and CHIP Reauthorization Act (MACRA) was passed, pushing towards electronic health records. In the article "Health Information Technology: Integration, Patient Empowerment, and Security", K. Marvin provided multiple different polls based on people's views on different types of technology entering the medical field most answers were responded with somewhat likely and very few completely disagreed on the technology being used in medicine. Marvin discusses the maintenance required to protect medical data and technology against cyber attacks as well as providing a proper data backup system for the information.

Patient Protection and Affordable Care Act (ACA) also known as Obamacare and health information technology health care is in the digital era. Although this technology needs to be protected. Both health information and financial information now made digital within the health industry might become a target for cyber-crime. Even with multiple different types of safeguards, hackers may find their way in. The security needs to constantly be updated to prevent these breaches.

==== Policy ====
With the increased use of IT systems, privacy violations were increasing rapidly due to the easier access and poor management. As such, the concern of privacy has become an important topic in healthcare. Privacy breaches happen when organizations do not protect the privacy of people's data. There are four types of privacy breaches, which include unintended disclosure by authorized personnel, intended disclosure by authorized personnel, privacy data loss or theft, and virtual hacking. It became more important to protect the privacy and security of patients' data because of the high negative impact on both individuals and organizations. Stolen personal information can be used to open credit cards or other unethical behaviors. Also, individuals have to spend a large amount of money to rectify the issue. The exposure of sensitive health information also can have negative impacts on individuals' relationships, jobs, or other personal areas. For the organization, the privacy breach can cause loss of trust, customers, legal actions, and monetary fines.

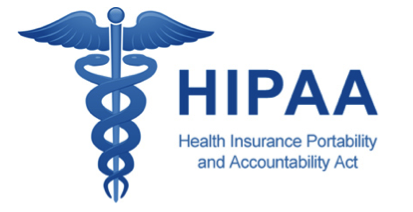
Health Insurance Portability and Accountability Act of 1996

HIPAA stands for the Health Insurance Portability and Accountability Act of 1996. It is a U.S. healthcare legislation to direct how patient data is used and includes two major rules which are privacy and security of data. The privacy rule protects people's rights to privacy and security rule determines how to protect people's privacy.

According to the HIPAA Security Rule, it ensures that protected health information has three characteristics: confidentiality, availability, and integrity. Confidentiality indicates keeping the data confidential to prevent data loss or individuals who are unauthorized to access that protected health information. Availability allows people who are authorized to access the systems and networks when and where that information is in fact needed, such as natural disasters. In cases like this, protected health information is mostly backed up on to a separate server or printed out in paper copies, so people can access it. Lastly, integrity ensures not using inaccurate information and improperly modified data due to a bad design system or process to protect the permanence of the patient data. The consequences of using inaccurate or improperly modified data could become useless or even dangerous.

Health Organizations of HIPAA also created administrative safeguards, physical safeguards, technical safeguards, to help protect the privacy of patients. Administrative safeguards typically include security management process, security personnel, information access management, workforce training and management, and evaluation of security policies and procedures. Security management processes are one of the important administrative safeguards' examples. It is essential to reduce the risks and vulnerabilities of the system. The processes are mostly the standard operating procedures written out as training manuals. The purpose is to educate people on how to handle protected health information in proper behavior.

Physical safeguards include lock and key, card swipe, positioning of screens, confidential envelopes, and shredding of paper copies. Lock and key are common examples of physical safeguards. They can limit physical access to facilities. Lock and key are simple, but they can prevent individuals from stealing medical records. Individuals must have an actual key to access to the lock.

Lastly, technical safeguards include access control, audit controls, integrity controls, and transmission security. The access control mechanism is a common example of technical safeguards. It allows the access of authorized personnel. The technology includes authentication and authorization. Authentication is the proof of identity that handles confidential information like username and password, while authorization is the act of determining whether a particular user is allowed to access certain data and perform activities in a system like add and delete.

=== Assessment ===
The concept of health technology assessment (HTA) was first coined in 1967 by the U.S. Congress in response to the increasing need to address the unintended and potential consequences of health technology, along with its prominent role in society. It was further institutionalized with the establishment of the congressional Office of Technology Assessment (OTA) in 1972–1973. HTA is defined as a comprehensive form of policy research that examines short- and long-term consequences of the application of technology, including benefits, costs, and risks. Due to the broad scope of technology assessment, it requires the participation of individuals besides scientists and health care practitioners such as managers and even the consumers.

Several American organizations provide health technology assessments and these include the Centers for Medicare and Medicaid Services (CMS) and the Veterans Administration through its VA Technology Assessment Program (VATAP). The models adopted by these institutions vary, although they focus on whether a medical technology being offered is therapeutically relevant. A study conducted in 2007 noted that the assessments still did not use formal economic analyses.

Aside from its development, however, assessment in the health technology industry has been viewed as sporadic and fragmented Issues such as the determination of products that needed to be developed, cost, and access, among others, also emerged. These, some argue, need to be included in the assessment since health technology is never purely a matter of science but also of beliefs, values, and ideologies. One of the mechanisms being suggested either as an element of or an alternative to the current TAs is bioethics, which is also referred to as the "fourth-generation" evaluation framework. There are at least two dimensions to an ethical HTA. The first involves the incorporation of ethics in the methodological standards employed to assess technologies while the second is concerned with the use of ethical framework in research and judgment on the part of the researchers who produce information used in the industry.

=== In the future ===
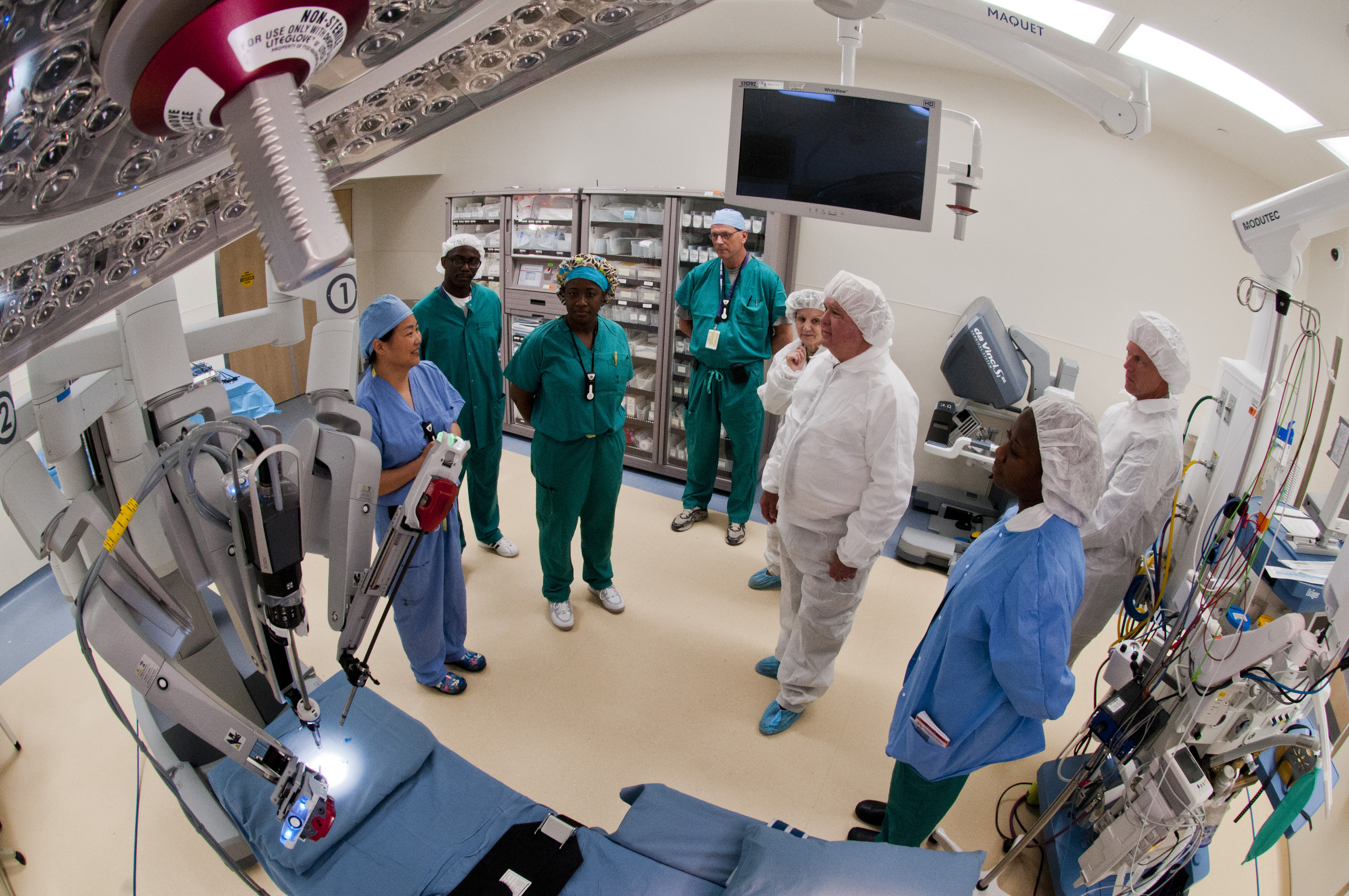
Fort Belvoir Community Hospital astounds with groundbreaking technology and devotion to patient care.

The practice of medicine in the United States is currently in a major transition. This transition is due to many factors, but primarily because of the implementation and integration of health technologies into healthcare. In recent years, the widespread adoption of electronic health records (EHR) has greatly impacted healthcare. In his book The Digital Doctor: Hope, Hype, and Harm at the Dawn of Medicine's Computer Age, Robert Wachter aims to inform readers about this transition. Wachter states that there will be fewer hospitals in the future, and due to the advancement of technologies, people will be more likely to go to hospitals for major surgeries or critical illness. In the future, nurse call buttons will not be needed in hospitals. Instead, robots will deliver medication, take care of patients, and administer the system. In addition, the electronic health record will look different. Healthcare providers will be able to enter the notes via speech-to-text transcriptions in real-time.

Wachter stated that information will be edited collaboratively across the patient-care team to improve the quality. Also, natural language processing will be more developed to help parse out keywords. In the future, patient data will reside in the cloud, and patients as well as authorized providers and individuals will be able to access their data from any device or location. Big data analysis will constantly be improving. Artificial intelligence and machine learning will be constantly improving and developing as it receives new data. Alerts will also be more intelligent and efficient than the current systems.

== Medical technology ==
Medical technology, or "medtech", encompasses a wide range of healthcare products and is used to treat diseases and medical conditions affecting humans. Such technologies are intended to improve the quality of healthcare delivered through earlier diagnosis, less invasive treatment options and reduction in hospital stays and rehabilitation times. Recent advances in medical technology have also focused on cost reduction. Medical technology may broadly include medical devices, information technology, biotech, and healthcare services.

The impacts of medical technology involve social and ethical issues. For example, physicians can seek objective information from technology rather than read subjective patient reports.

A major driver of the sector's growth is the consumerization of medtech. Supported by the widespread availability of smartphones and tablets, providers can reach a large audience at low cost, a trend that stands to be consolidated as wearable technologies spread throughout the market.

In the years 2010–2015, venture funding has grown 200%, allowing US$11.7 billion to flow into health tech businesses from over 30,000 investors in the space.

=== Types of technology ===
Medical technology has evolved into smaller portable devices, for instance, smartphones, touchscreens, tablets, laptops, digital ink, voice and face recognition and more. With this technology, innovations like electronic health records (EHR), health information exchange (HIE), Nationwide Health Information Network (NwHIN), personal health records (PHRs), patient portals, nanomedicine, genome-based personalized medicine, Geographical Positioning System (GPS), radio frequency identification (RFID), telemedicine, clinical decision support (CDS), mobile home health care and cloud computing came to exist.

Medical imaging and magnetic resonance imaging (MRI) have been long used and proven medical technologies for medical research, patient reviewing, and treatment analyzing. With the advancement of imagining technologies, including the use of faster and more data, higher resolution images, and specialist automation software, the capabilities of medical imaging technology are growing and yielding better results. As the imaging hardware and software evolve this means that patients will need to use less contrasting agents, and also spend less time and money.

Further advancement in healthcare is electromagnetic (EM) technology guidance systems, used in medical procedures, allowing real-time visualization and navigation for the placement of medical devices inside the human body. For example, a neuro-navigated catheter is inserted into the brain, or a feeding tube placement in the stomach or small intestine, as demonstrated by the ENvue System. ENvue is an advanced electromagnetic navigation system for enteral feeding tube placement. The system uses a field generator and several EM sensors enabling proper scaling of the display to the patient's body contour, and real-time view of the feeding tube tip location and direction, which helps the medical staff ensure correct placement and avoid placement of the tube in the lungs.

3D printing is another major development in healthcare. It can be used to produce specialized splints, prostheses, parts for medical devices and inert implants. The end goal of 3D printing for some individuals is being able to print out customized replaceable body parts. In the following section, it will explain more about 3D printing in healthcare. New types of technologies also include artificial intelligence and robots.

==== 3D printing ====
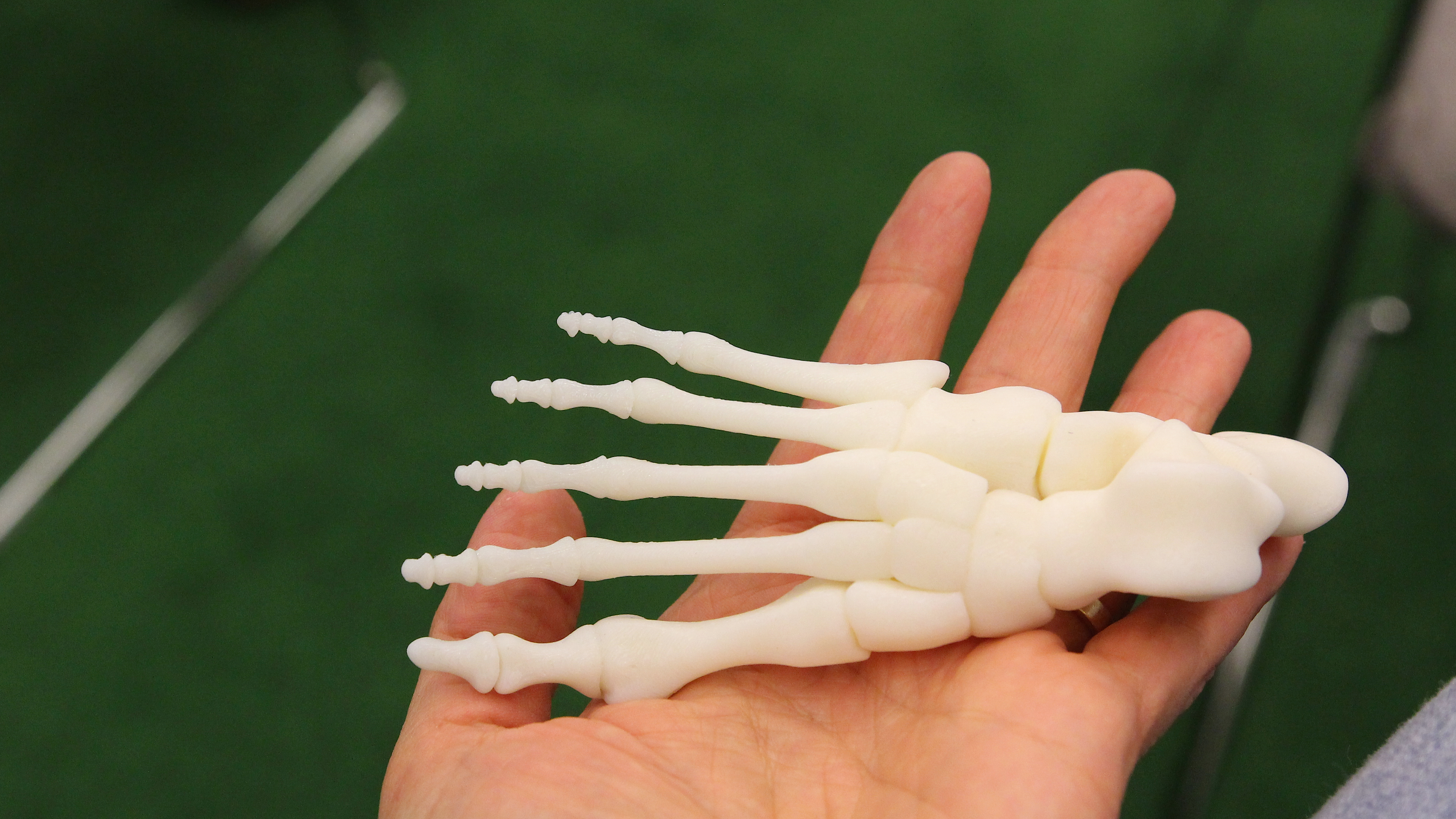
3D-printing Sliperiet

3D printing is the use of specialized machines, software programs and materials to automate the process of building certain objects. It is having a rapid growth in the prosthesis, medical implants, novel drug formulations and the bioprinting of human tissues and organs.

Companies such as Surgical Theater provide new technology that is capable of capturing 3D virtual images of patients' brains to use as practice for operations.

3D printing allows medical companies to produce prototypes to practice before an operation created with artificial tissue.

3D printing technologies are great for bio-medicine because the materials that are used to make allow the fabrication with control over many design features.

3D printing also has the benefits of affordable customization, more efficient designs, and saving more time. 3D printing could be a precise tool in designing pills to house several drugs, because the control over the structure of pills that 3D Printing provides could in theory help make better pills for drugs that have specific release times. The technology allows the pills to transport to the targeted area and degrade safely in the body. As such, pills could be designed more efficiently and conveniently. In the future, doctors might be giving a digital file of printing instructions instead of a prescription for medicine.

3D printing also may have the benefits of affordable customization, more efficient designs, and saving more time. 3D printing could be a precise tool in designing pills to house several drugs, because the control over the structure of pills that 3D Printing provides could in theory help make better pills for drugs that have specific release times. The technology allows the pills to transport to the targeted area and degrade safely in the body.

Besides, 3D printing might become more useful in medical implants. An example includes a surgical team that has designed a tracheal splint made by 3D printing to improve the respiration of a patient. This example shows the potential of 3D printing, which allows physicians to develop new implant and instrument designs easily.

Overall, in the future of medicine, 3D printing will likely be crucial as it can be used in surgical planning, artificial and prosthetic devices, drugs, medical implants, and more.

==== Artificial intelligence ====
The scale and capabilities of generative artificial intelligence (AI) systems are growing rapidly, notably due to advances in big data. In healthcare, it is expected to provide easier accessibility of information, and to improve treatments while reducing cost. The integration of AI in healthcare tends to improve the quality and efficiency of complex tasks.

Risks related to AI include the potential lack of accuracy, and privacy concerns related to the collected data. Delegating decisions to AI systems may also undermine accountability. Moreover, AI systems sometimes learn undesired behaviors from their training data. For example, an AI trained to detect skin diseases was found to have a strong tendency to classify images containing a ruler as cancerous, since pictures of malignancies typically include a ruler to show the scale.

===== Applications =====
Generative AI brings many benefits to the healthcare industry. AI can help to detect diseases, administer chronic conditions, deliver health services, and discover new drugs. Furthermore, AI has the potential to address important health challenges. In healthcare organizations, AI is able to plan and relocate resources. AI is able to match patients with healthcare providers that meet their needs. AI can also help improve the healthcare experience by creating apps to identify patients' anxieties.

In medical research, AI helps to analyze and evaluate the patterns and complex data. For instance, AI is important in drug discovery because it can search relevant studies and analyze different kinds of data. In clinical care, AI helps to detect diseases, analyze clinical data, publications, and guidelines. As such, AI can aid to find the best treatments for the patients. Other uses of AI in clinical care include medical imaging, echocardiography, screening, and surgery. The ability of AlphaFold to predict how proteins fold also significantly accelerated medical research.

===== Education =====
Medical virtual reality provides doctors multiple surgical scenarios that could happen and allows them to practice and prepare themselves for these situations. It also permits medical students a hands-on experience of different procedures without the consequences of making potential mistakes. ORamaVR is one of the leading companies that employ such medical virtual reality technologies to transform medical education (knowledge) and training (skills) to improve patient outcomes, reduce surgical errors and training time and democratize medical education and training.

==== Robots ====
Modern robotics have made huge progress and contribution to healthcare. Robots can help doctors in performing variety tasks. Robotics adoption is increasing tremendously in hospitals. The following are different ways to improve healthcare by using robots:

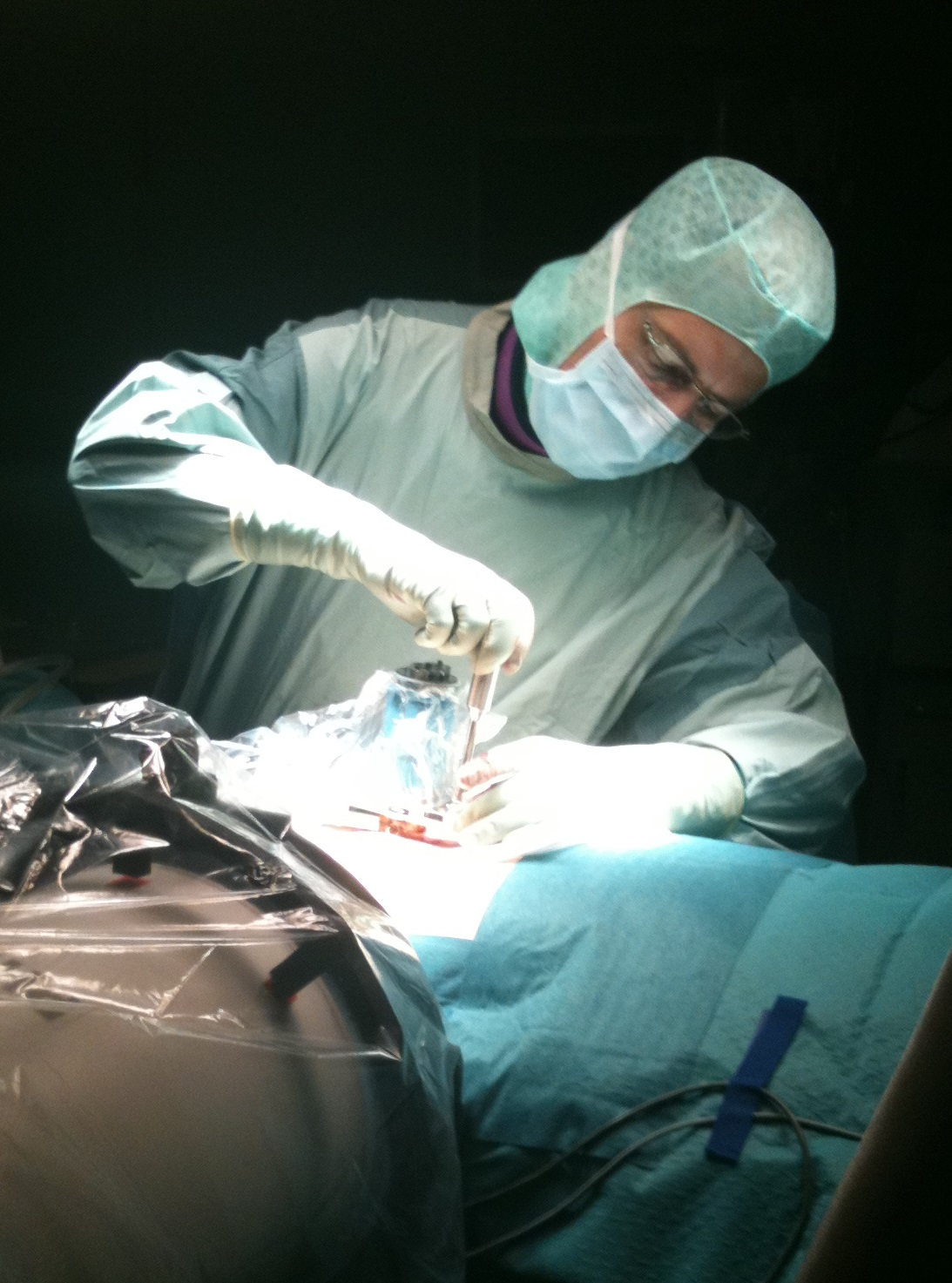
Robotic Spinal Surgery

Surgical robots are one of the robotic systems, which allows a surgeon to bend and rotate tissues in a more flexible and efficient way. The system is equipped with a3D magnification vision system that can translate the hand movements of the surgeon to be precise in-order to perform a surgery with minimal incisions. Other robotics systems include the ability to diagnose and treat cancers. Many scientists began working on creating a next-generation robot system to assist the surgeon in performing knee and other bone replacement surgeries.

Assistant robots could also be important to help reduce the workload for regular medical staff. They can help nurses with simple and time-consuming tasks like carrying multiple racks of medicines, lab specimen or other sensitive materials.

Shortly, robotic pills are expected to reduce the number of surgeries. They can be moved inside a patient and delivered to the desired area. In addition, they could conduct biopsies, film the area and clear clogged arteries.

Overall, medical robots are extremely useful in assisting physicians; however, it might take time to be professionally trained working with medical robots and for the robots to respond to a clinician's instructions. As such, many researchers and startups were working constantly to provide solutions to these challenges.

=== Assistive technologies ===
Assistive technologies are products designed to provide accessibility to individuals who have physical or cognitive problems or disabilities. They aim to improve the quality of life with assistive technologies. The range of assistive technologies is broad, ranging from low-tech solutions to physical hardware, to technical devices. There are four areas of assistive technologies, which include visual impairment, hearing impairment, physical limitations, cognitive limitations. There are many benefits of assistive technologies. They enable individuals to care for themselves, work, study, access information easily, improve independence and communication, and lastly participate fully in community life.

=== Consumer-driven healthcare software ===
As part of an ongoing trend towards consumer-driven healthcare, websites or apps which provide more information on health care quality and price to help patients choose their providers have grown. As of 2017, the sites with the most number of reviews in descending order included Healthgrades, Vitals.com, and RateMDs.com. Yelp, Google, and Facebook also host reviews with a large amount of traffic, although as of 2017 they had fewer medical reviews per doctor. Disputes around online reviews can lead to websites by health professionals alleging defamation. In 2018 Vitals.com was purchased by WebMD which is owned by Internet Brands.

Patient safety organizations and government programs which have historically assessed quality have made their data more accessible over the internet; notable examples include the HospitalCompare by CMS and the LeapFrog Group's hospitalsafetygrade.org.

Patient-oriented software may also help in other ways, including general education and appointments.

Disclosure of legal disputes including medical license complaints or malpractice lawsuits has also been made easier. Every state discloses license status and at least some disciplinary action to the public, but as of 2018, this was not accessible via the internet for a few states. Consumers can look up medical licenses in a national database, DocInfo.org, maintained by the medical licensing organizations which contains limited details. Other tools include DocFinder at docfinder.docboard.org and certificationmatters.org from the American Board of Medical Specialties. In some cases more information is available from a mailed or walk-in request than the internet; for example, the Medical Board of California removes dismissed accusations from website profiles, but these are still available from a written or walk-in request, or a lookup in a separate database. The trend to disclosure is controversial and generate significant public debate, particularly about opening up the National Practitioner Data Bank. In 1996, Massachusetts became the first state to require detailed disclosure of malpractice claims.

=== Self-monitoring ===
Smartphones, tablets, and wearable computers have allowed people to monitor their health. These devices run numerous applications that are designed to provide simple health services and the monitoring of one's health with finding as critical problems to health as possible. An example of this is Fitbit, a fitness tracker that is worn on the user's wrist. This wearable technology allows people to track their steps, heart rate, floors climbed, miles walked, active minutes, and even sleep patterns. The data collected and analyzed allow users not just to keep track of their health but also help manage it, particularly through its capability to identify health risk factors.

There is also the case of the Internet, which serves as a repository of information and expert content that can be used to "self-diagnose" instead of going to their doctor. For instance, one need only enumerate symptoms as search parameters at Google and the search engine could identify the illness from the list of contents uploaded to the World Wide Web, particularly those provided by expert/medical sources. These advances may eventually have some effect on doctor visits from patients and change the role of the health professionals from "gatekeeper to secondary care to facilitator of information interpretation and decision-making." Apart from basic services provided by Google in Search, there are also companies such as WebMD that already offer dedicated symptom-checking apps.

=== Technology testing ===
All medical equipment introduced commercially must meet both United States and international regulations. The devices are tested on their material, effects on the human body, all components including devices that have other devices included with them, and the mechanical aspects.

The Medical Device User Fee and Modernization Act of 2002 was created to speed up the FDA's approval process of medical technology by introducing sponsor user fees for a faster review time with predetermined performance targets for review time. In addition, 36 devices and apps were approved by the FDA in 2016.

== Careers ==
There are numerous careers in health technology in the US. Listed below are some job titles and average salaries.

- Athletic trainer, mean salary: $41,340. Athletic trainers treat athletes and other individuals who have sustained injuries. They also teach people how to prevent injuries. They perform their job under the supervision of physicians.
- Dental hygienist, mean salary: $67,340. Dental hygienists provide preventive dental care and teach patients how to maintain good oral health. They usually work under dentists' supervision.
- Clinical laboratory scientists, technicians, and technologists, mean salary: $51,770. Lab technicians and technologists perform laboratory tests and procedures. Technicians work under the supervision of a laboratory technologist or laboratory manager.
- Nuclear medicine technologist, mean salary: $67,910. Nuclear medicine technologists prepare and administer radiopharmaceuticals, radioactive drugs, to patients to treat or diagnose diseases.
- Pharmacy technician, mean salary: $28,070. Pharmacy technicians assist pharmacists with the preparation of prescription medications for customers.

=== Allied professions ===
The term medical technology may also refer to the duties performed by clinical laboratory professionals or medical technologists in various settings within the public and private sectors. The work of these professionals encompasses clinical applications of chemistry, genetics, hematology, immunohematology (blood banking), immunology, microbiology, serology, urinalysis, and miscellaneous body fluid analysis. Depending on location, educational level, and certifying body, these professionals may be referred to as biomedical scientists, medical laboratory scientists (MLS), medical technologists (MT), medical laboratory technologists and medical laboratory technicians.
