= Ioannis Anastasopoulos =

Greek geotechnical engineer (1976-)

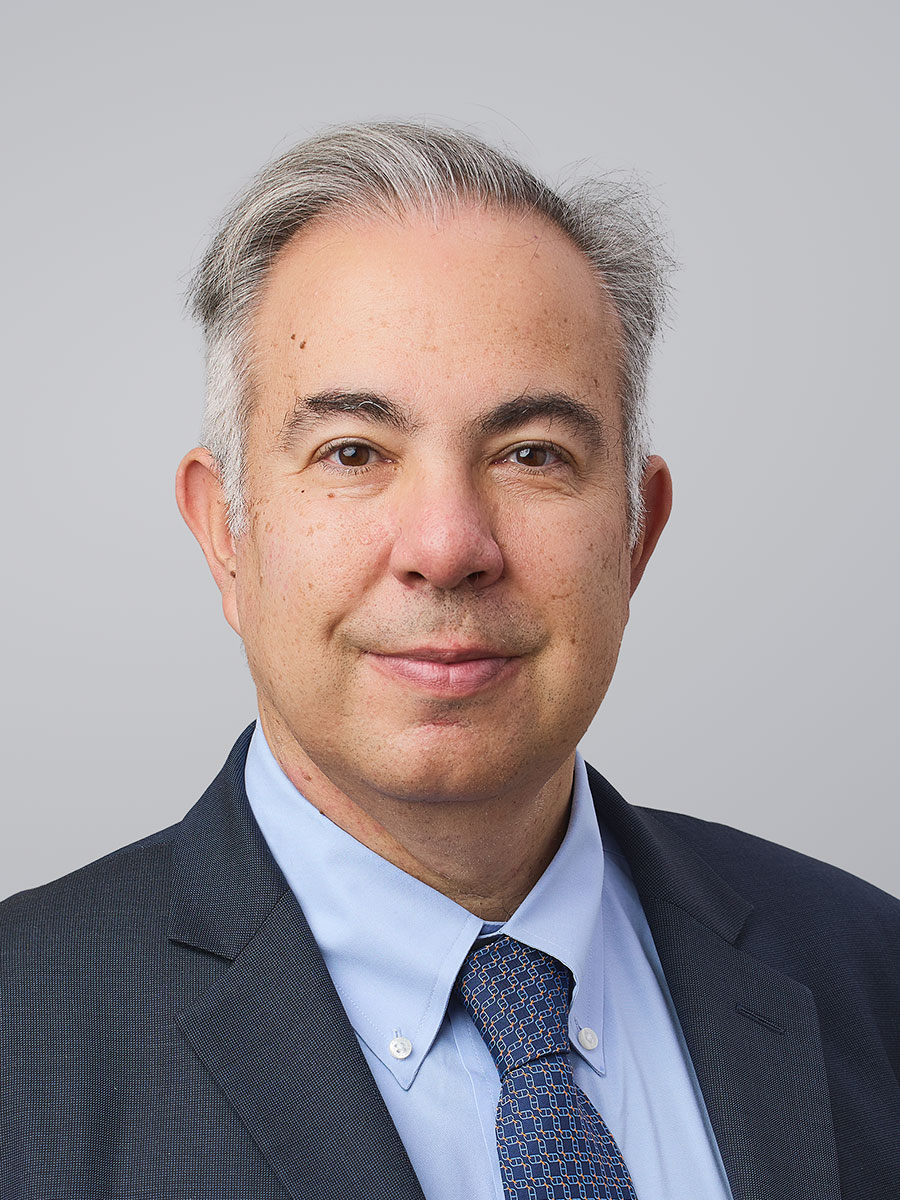
- Ioannis Anastasopoulos (2025)
- Born: 2 March 1976 (age 50); Athens
- Education: National Technical University of Athens (PhD), Purdue University (MSc)
- Scientific career
- Fields: Geotechnical engineering, earthquake engineering
- Workplaces: ETH Zurich
- Thesis: Fault Rupture-Soil-Foundation-Structure Interaction (2005)
- Doctoral advisor: George Gazetas

Ioannis Anastasopoulos (born 2 March 1976) is professor of Geotechnical engineering at ETH Zurich and Head of the Department of Civil, Environmental and Geomatic Engineering (Dean of Faculty) at ETH Zurich.

== Biography ==
Ioannis Anastasopoulos graduated in Civil Engineering from the National Technical University of Athens in 1999 and completed his Master's degree at Purdue University in the USA in 2000. In 2005, he received his doctorate in geotechnical earthquake engineering from the National Technical University of Athens. From 2005 to 2013, he was laboratory manager, postdoctoral researcher, lecturer and finally assistant professor. Anastasopoulos was a full professor at the School of Science and Engineering at the University of Dundee from 2013 to 2016. He has been a full professor of geotechnical engineering at ETH Zurich since 2016 and Head of the Department of Civil, Environmental and Geomatic Engineering (D-BAUG) since 2023. In various articles, Anastasopoulos states that the 1995 Great Hanshin earthquake (Kobe) sparked his interest in geotechnical earthquake engineering.

== Research ==
His research interests include the seismic design of pile groups, the design of structures against tectonic deformations, tsunamis and floods and their effects on infrastructure, and soil liquefaction. He specializes in geotechnical earthquake engineering and soil-structure interaction, combining numerical and experimental methods. At the ETH Zürich Geotechnical Centrifuge Center (GCC), directed by Anastasopoulos, state-of-the-art experimental simulations can be carried out, as the center is equipped with the largest geotechnical centrifuge (500gton) in Europe with, among other things a bespoke art earthquake simulator and a large number of actuators, tool platforms and highly specialized devices and sensors. The centrifuge generates artificial gravity, which allows simulations of events such as earthquakes to be carried out with reduced-scale models, in a realistic manner, avoiding scale effects.

Anastasopoulos has been involved as a consultant in a large number of projects in Europe, as well as in the USA and the Middle East. His consulting work ranges from the design of foundations for tall buildings/towers, special seismic design for new and retrofitting of existing bridges, retaining walls, subway stations and tunnels, to harbor quay walls and special design for protection against faulting-induced deformation.

== Awards ==
Anastasopoulos is the winner of the 2012 Shamsher Prakash Research Award and the first recipient of the Young Researcher Award in Geotechnical Earthquake Engineering from the International Society for Soil Mechanics and Geotechnical Engineering. In 2021 he was elected to the Board of Directors of the International Association for Earthquake Engineering (IAEE) and since 2022 he has been the Chair of TC104 on Physical Modelling of the International Society for Soil Mechanics and Geotechnical Engineering (ISSMGE). Since 2024 he has been Editor-in-Chief of the international journal Soil Dynamics and Earthquake Engineering (SDEE).

== Publications (selection) ==
- Anastasopoulos I., Gazetas G., Loli M., Apostolou M, Gerolymos N. (2010). Soil Failure can be used for Earthquake Protection of Structures, Bulletin of Earthquake Engineering, 8(2), S. 309–326, DOI: 10.1007/s10518-009-9145-2.
- Agalianos A., Korre E., Abdoun T., Anastasopoulos I. (2021), Surface foundation subjected to strike-slip faulting on dense sand: centrifuge testing versus numerical analysis, Géotechnique, DOI: 10.1680/jgeot.21.00083.
- Ciancimino A., Jones L., Sakellariadis L., Anastasopoulos I., Foti S. (2021). Experimental assessment of the performance of a bridge pier subjected to flood induced Scour, Géotechnique DOI: 10.1680/jgeot.20.P.230.
- Kassas K., Adamidis O. and Anastasopoulos I. (2022). Structure-Soil-Structure Interaction (SSSI) of adjacent buildings with shallow foundations on liquefiable soil, Earthquake Engineering and Structural Dynamics, DOI: 10.1002/eqe.3665.
- Sakellariadis L., Anastasopoulos I. (2022) On the Mechanisms Governing the Response of Pile Groups Under Combined VHM Loading, Géotechnique DOI: 10.1680/jgeot.21.00236.
- Jones L., Anastasopoulos I. (2023). Bearing capacity of Breakwater subjected to Tsunami–induced scour, Journal of Geotechnical and Geoenvironmental Engineering, ASCE, DOI: 10.1061/JGGEFK.GTENG-11142.
- Kanellopoulos C., Rangelow P., Jeremic B., Anastasopoulos I., Stojadinovic B. (2023). Dynamic Structure-Soil-Structure Interaction for Nuclear Power Plant, Soil Dynamics and Earthquake Engineering, 181, 108631, DOI: 10.1016/j.soildyn.2024.108631.
- Antoniou M., Gelagoti F., Herzog R., Kourkoulis R., Anastasopoulos I. (2024). Offshore foundations in low-plasticity cohesive soils: Cyclic degradation experimental evidence and simplified numerical analysis, Ocean Engineering, 292, 116495, DOI: 10.1016/j.oceaneng.2023.116495.
