= Scientist =

Person who conducts scientific research

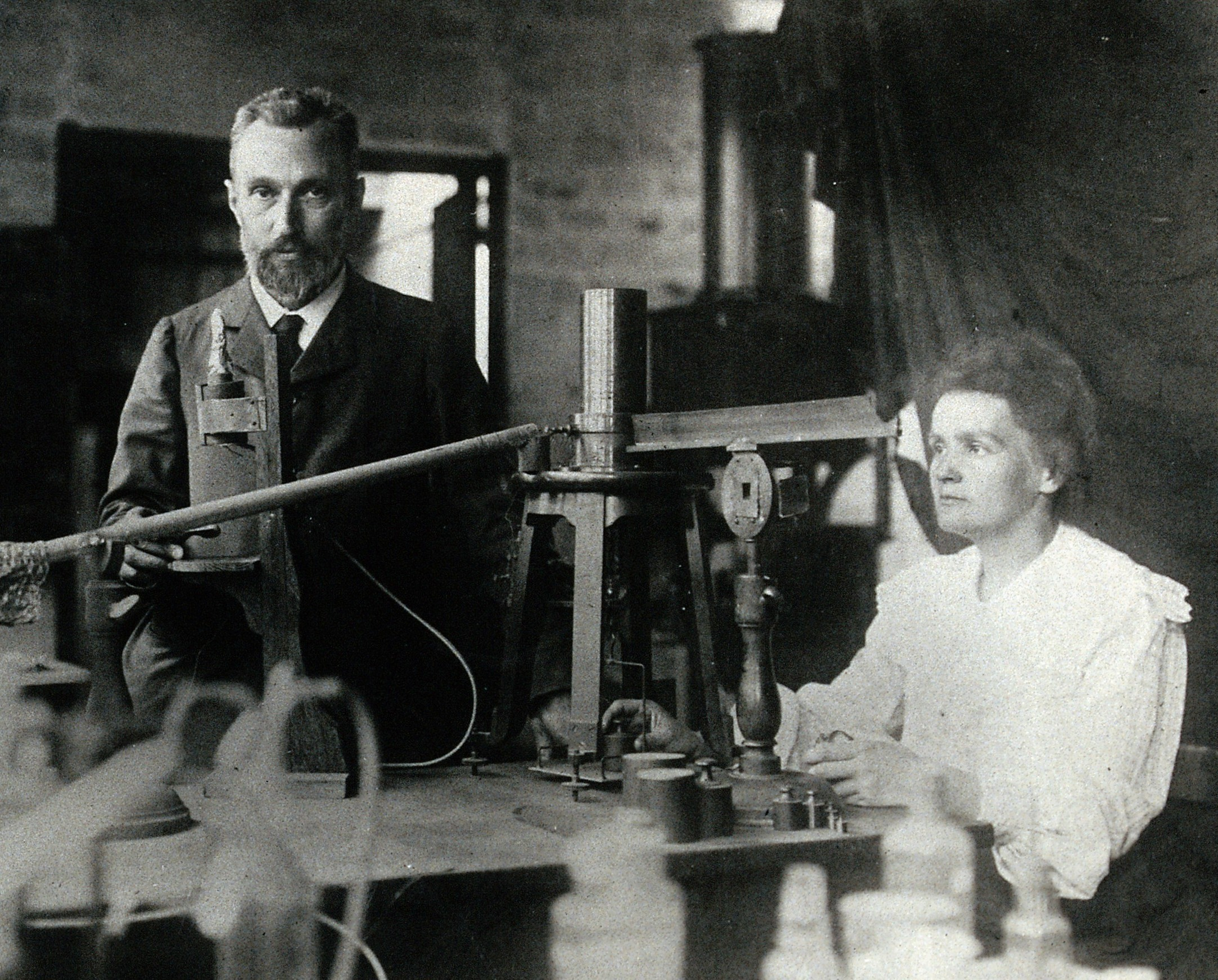
- Pierre Curie and Marie Skłodowska-Curie demonstrating an apparatus that detects radioactivity. They received the 1903 Nobel Prize in Physics for their scientific research; Marie also received the 1911 Nobel Prize in Chemistry.

Occupation
- Names: Scientist
- Occupation type: Profession
- Activity sectors: Laboratory, research university, field research

Description
- Competencies: Scientific research
- Education required: Science
- Fields of employment: Academia, industry, government, nonprofit
- Related jobs: Engineers, Mathematicians, Medical researcher

A scientist is an expert in one or more specific fields of science and who habitually uses scientific methods in carrying out scientific research to advance knowledge in science.

In classical antiquity, there was no real ancient analog of a modern scientist. Instead, philosophers engaged in the philosophical study of nature called natural philosophy. Though Thales (c. 624–545 BC) was arguably the first scientist for describing how cosmic events may be seen as natural, not necessarily caused by gods, it was not until the 19th century that the term scientist came into regular use: it was coined by the theologian, philosopher, and historian of science William Whewell to describe Mary Somerville.

== History ==
"No one in the history of civilization has shaped our understanding of science and natural philosophy more than the great Greek philosopher and scientist Aristotle (384–322 BC), who exerted a profound and pervasive influence for more than two thousand years" —Gary B. Ferngren

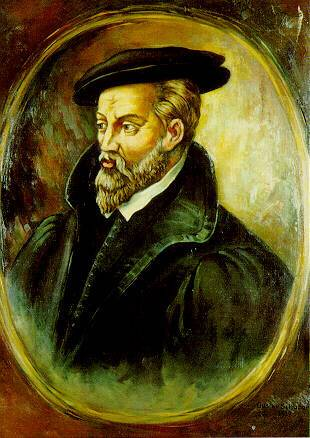
Georgius Agricola gave chemistry its modern name. Generally referred to as the father of mineralogy and the founder of geology as a scientific discipline.

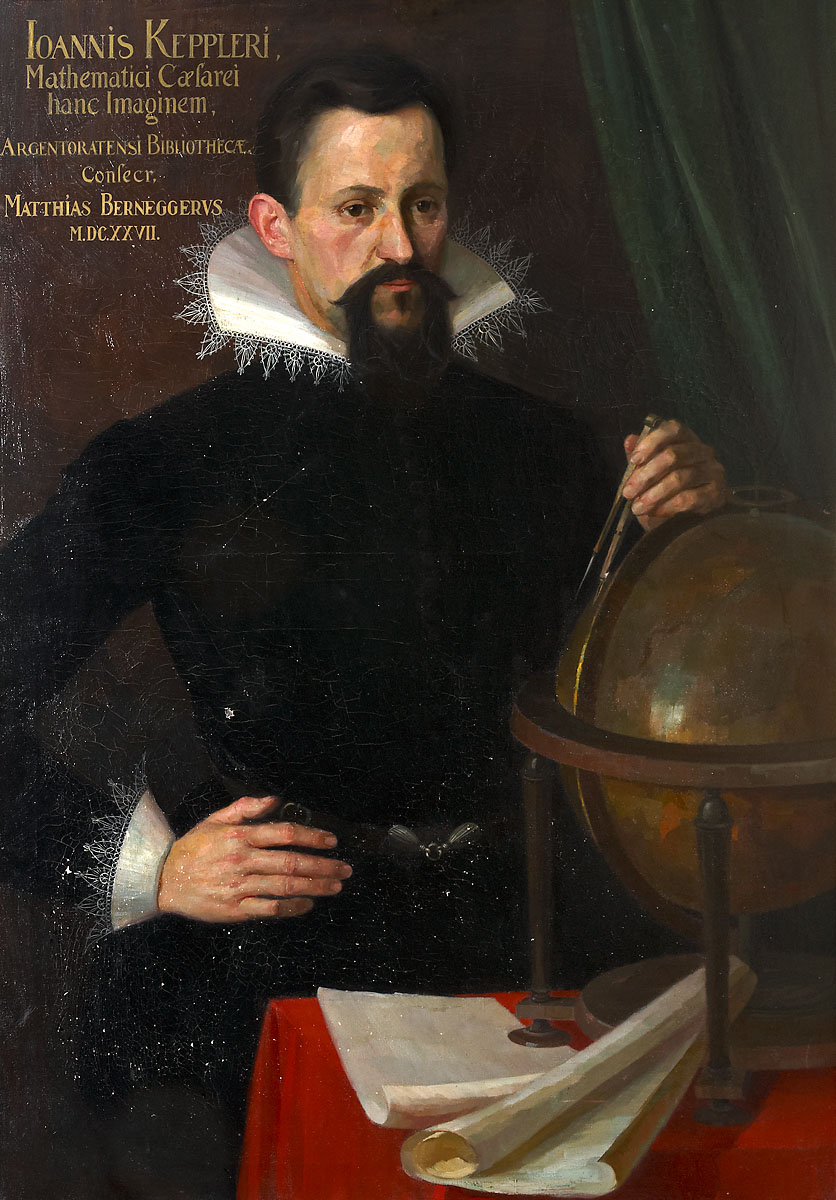
Johannes Kepler, one of the founders and fathers of modern astronomy, the scientific method, natural and modern science.

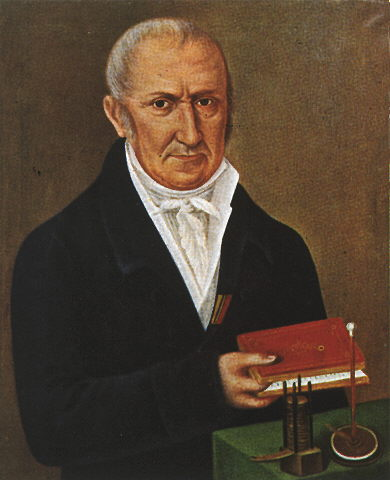
Alessandro Volta, the inventor of the electrical battery and discoverer of methane, is widely regarded as one of the greatest scientists in history.

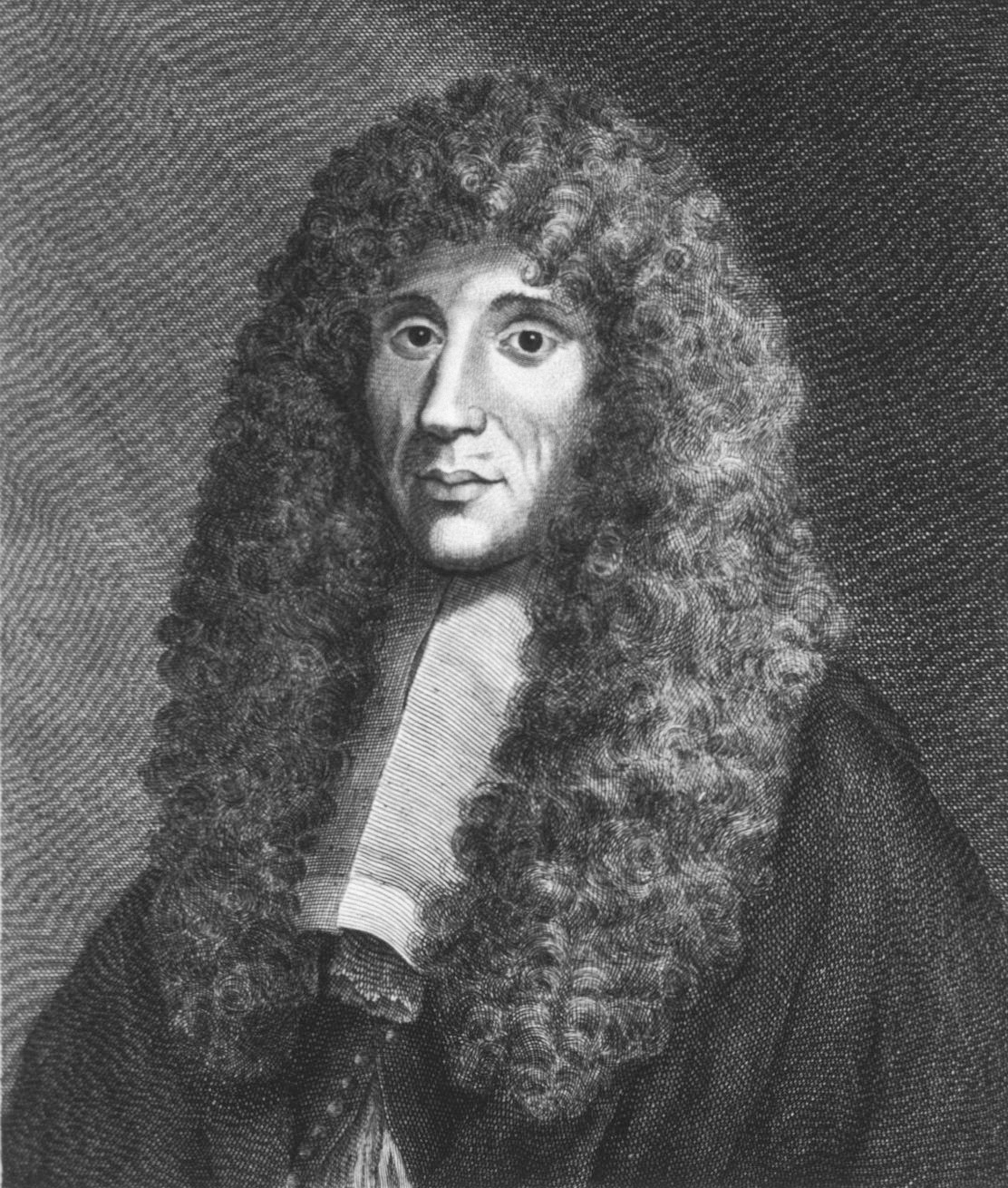
Francesco Redi, referred to as the "father of modern parasitology", is the founder of experimental biology.

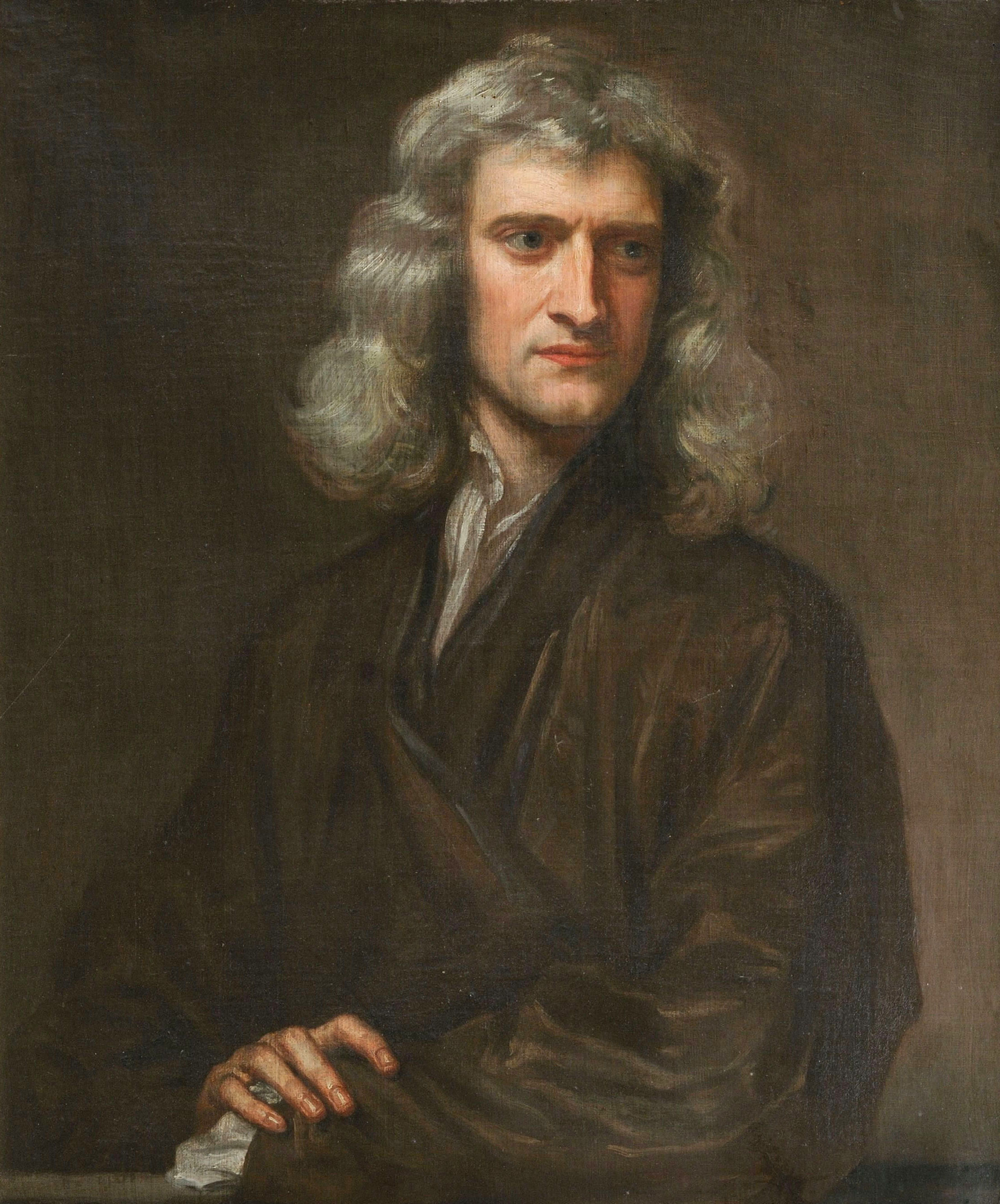
Isaac Newton, who is regarded as "the towering figure of the Scientific Revolution", and who achieved the first great unification in physics, created classical mechanics, calculus and refined the scientific method.

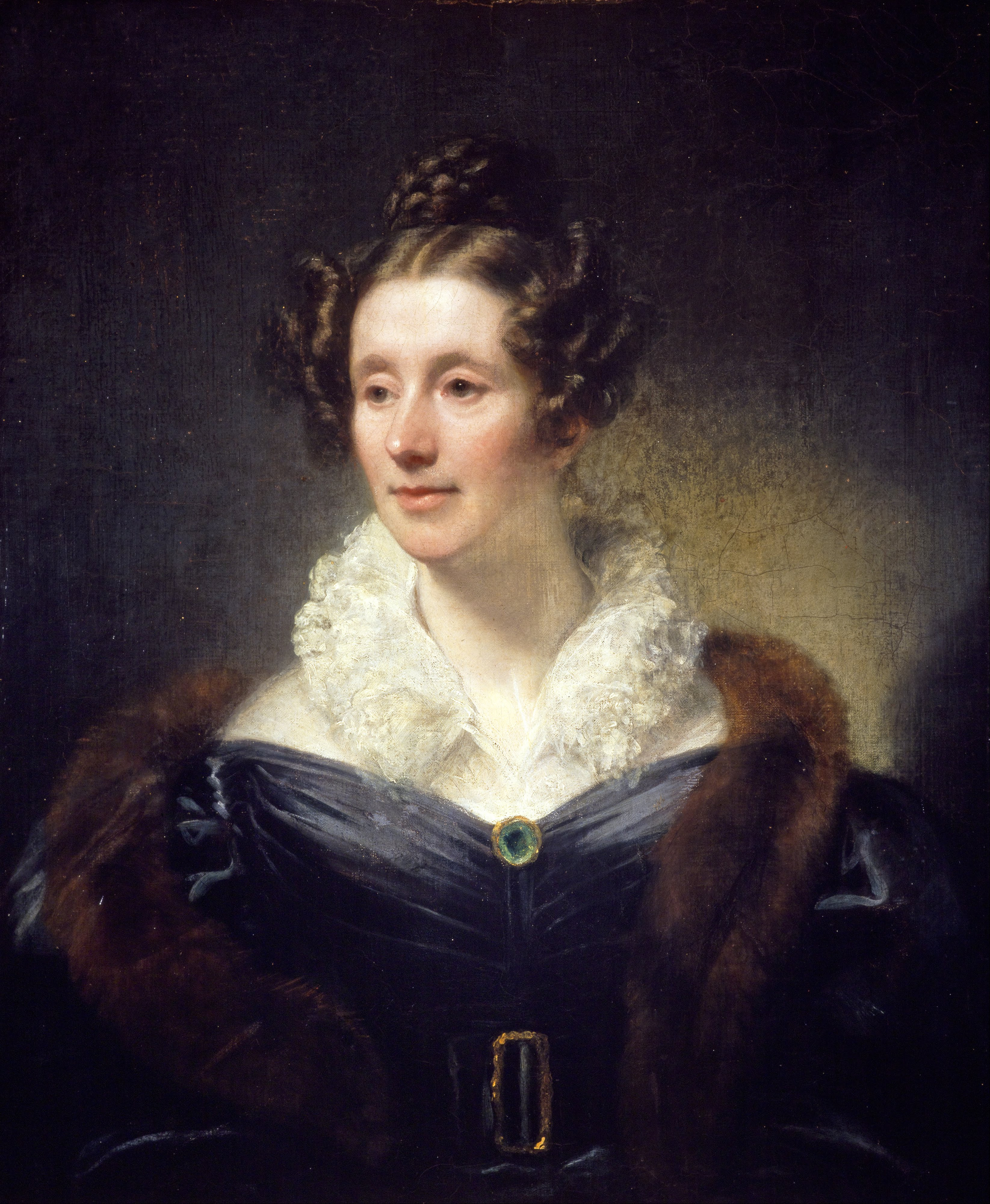
Mary Somerville, for whom the word "scientist" was coined.

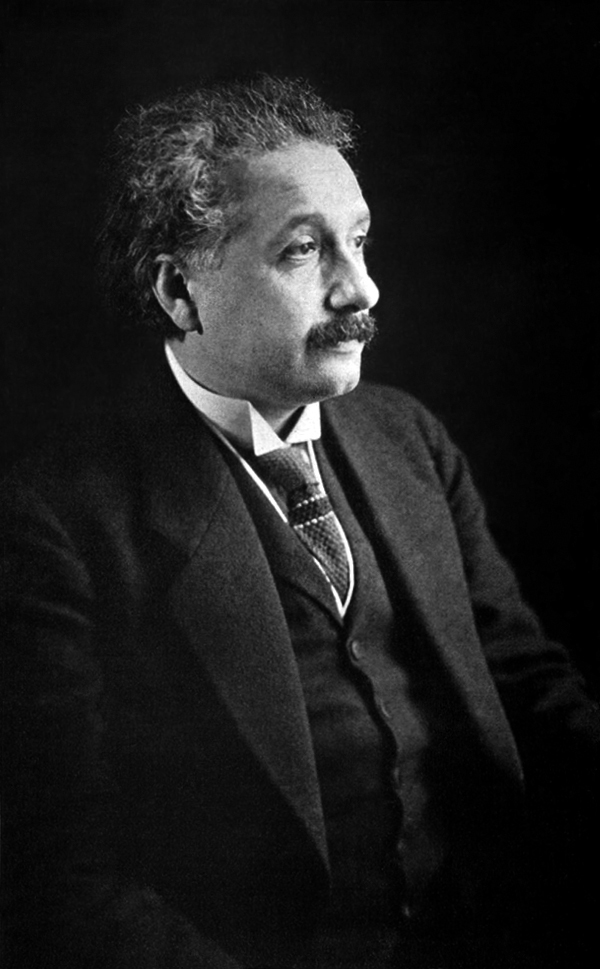
Physicist Albert Einstein developed the general theory of relativity and made many substantial contributions to physics.

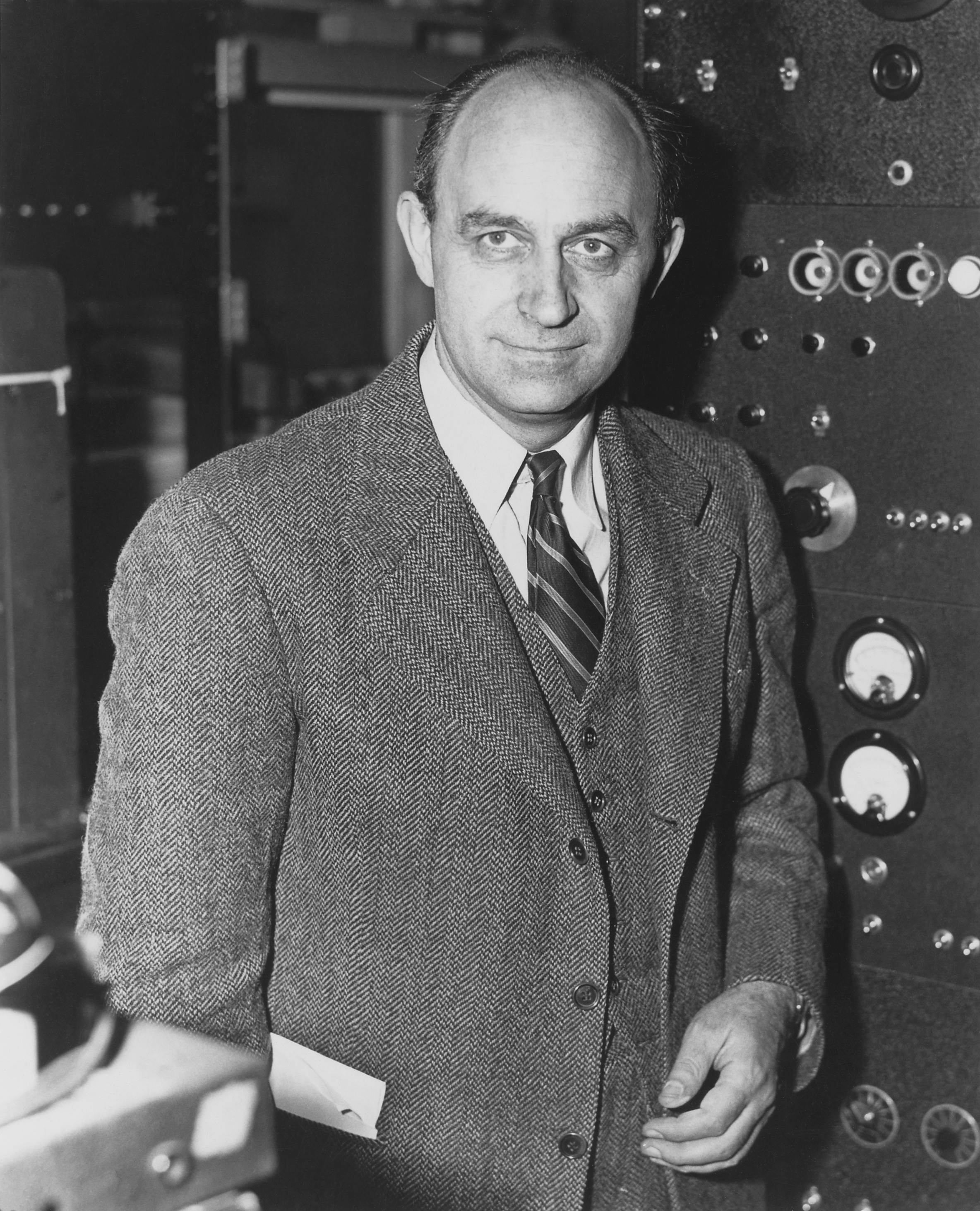
Physicist Enrico Fermi is credited with the creation of the world's first atomic bomb and nuclear reactor.

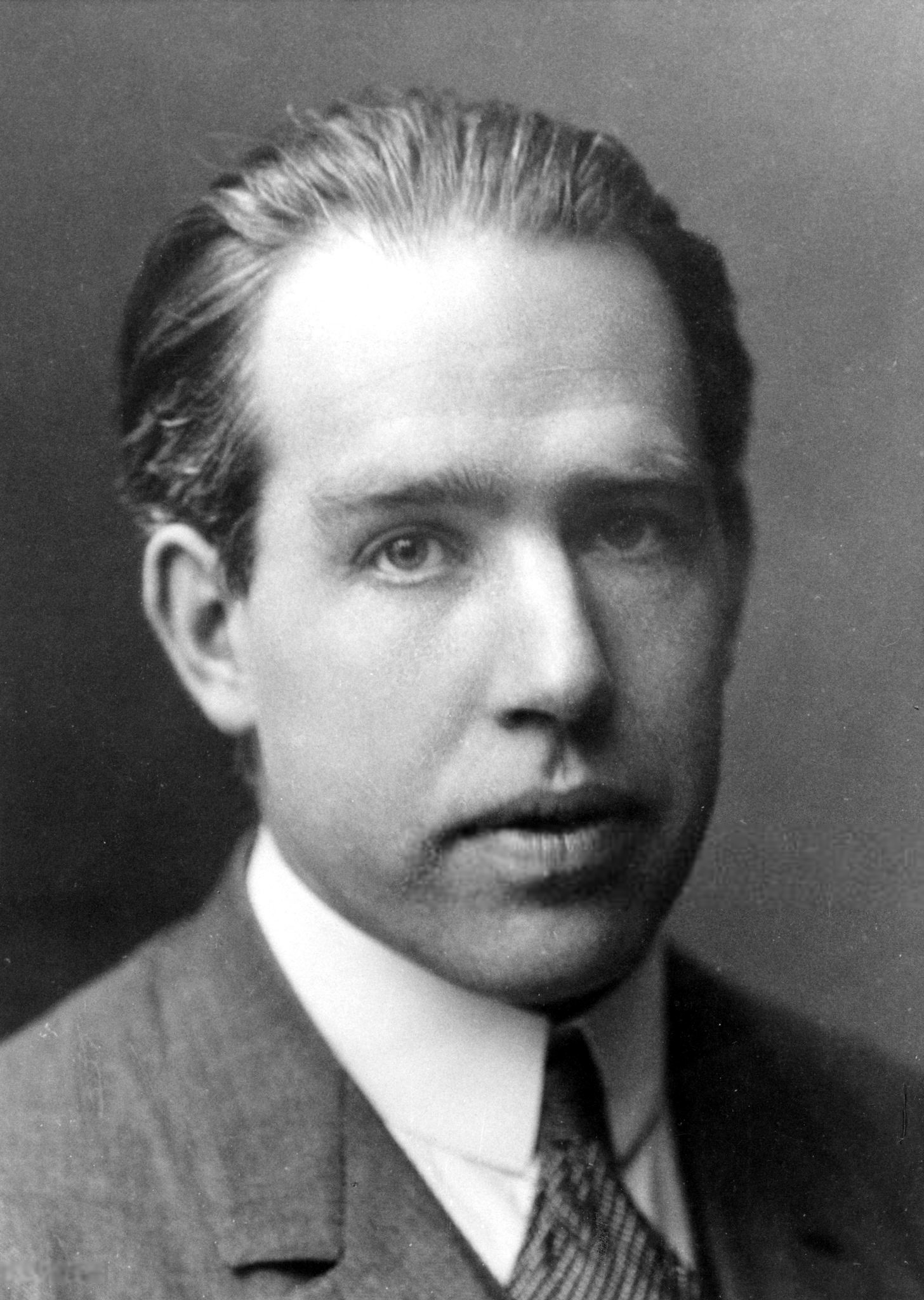
Atomic physicist Niels Bohr made fundamental contributions to understanding atomic structure and quantum theory.

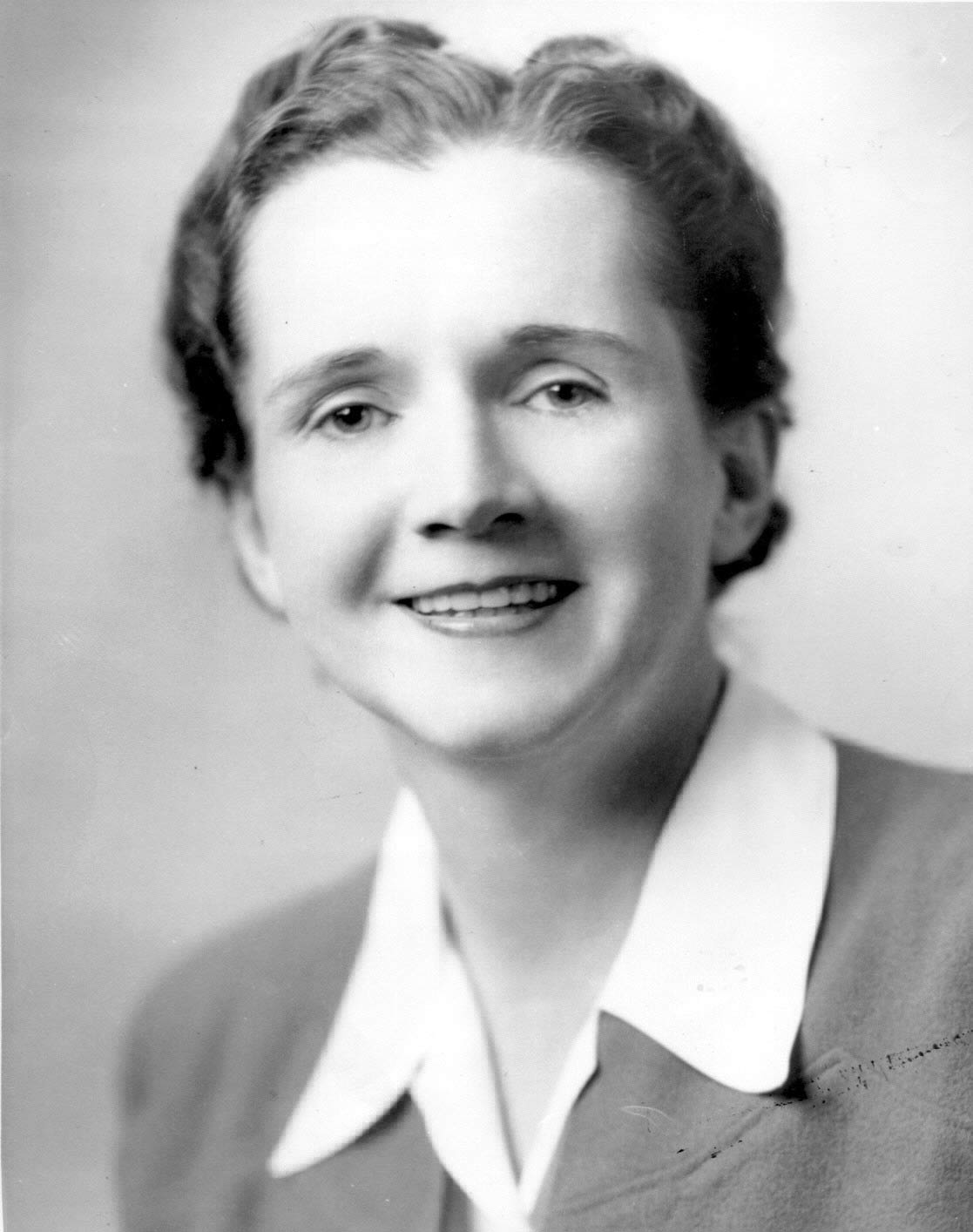
Marine Biologist Rachel Carson launched the 20th century environmental movement.

The roles of "scientists", and their predecessors before the emergence of modern scientific disciplines, have evolved considerably over time. Scientists of different eras (and before them, natural philosophers, mathematicians, natural historians, natural theologians, engineers, and others who contributed to the development of science) have had widely different places in society, and the social norms, ethical values, and epistemic virtues associated with scientists—and expected of them—have changed over time as well. Accordingly, many different historical figures can be identified as early scientists, depending on which characteristics of modern science are taken to be essential.

Some historians point to the Scientific Revolution that began in 16th century as the period when science in a recognizably modern form developed. It was not until the 19th century that sufficient socioeconomic changes had occurred for scientists to emerge as a major profession.

=== Classical antiquity ===
Knowledge about nature in classical antiquity was pursued by many kinds of scholars. Greek contributions to science—including works of geometry and mathematical astronomy, early accounts of biological processes and catalogs of plants and animals, and theories of knowledge and learning—were produced by philosophers and physicians, as well as practitioners of various trades. These roles, and their associations with scientific knowledge, spread with the Roman Empire and, with the spread of Christianity, became closely linked to religious institutions in most European countries. Astrology and astronomy became an important area of knowledge, and the role of astronomer/astrologer developed with the support of political and religious patronage. By the time of the medieval university system, knowledge was divided into the trivium—philosophy, including natural philosophy—and the quadrivium—mathematics, including astronomy. Hence, the medieval analogs of scientists were often either philosophers or mathematicians. Knowledge of plants and animals was broadly the province of physicians.

=== Middle Ages ===
Science in medieval Islam developed new approaches to acquiring natural knowledge, although these developments remained within existing social roles such as philosopher and mathematician. Many proto-scientists of the Islamic Golden Age are considered polymaths, partly because there were no clearly defined scientific disciplines as understood today.

Several of these early polymaths were also religious scholars. For example, Alhazen and al-Biruni were associated with mutakallimiin; the physician Avicenna was a hafiz; the physician Ibn al-Nafis was a hafiz, muhaddith, and ulema; the botanist Otto Brunfels was a theologian and historian of Protestantism; and the astronomer and physician Nicolaus Copernicus was a cleric.

During the Italian Renaissance, figures such as Leonardo da Vinci, Michelangelo, Galileo Galilei, and Gerolamo Cardano are often regarded as notable polymaths.

=== Renaissance ===
During the Renaissance, Italian scholars made significant contributions to science. Leonardo da Vinci made notable observations in paleontology and anatomy. Galileo Galilei, sometimes referred to as the father of modern science, improved the thermometer and telescope, enabling more detailed observations of the Solar System.

Descartes pioneered analytic geometry, formulated a theory of mechanics, and proposed ideas concerning animal movement and perception.

Research into vision engaged physicists such as Thomas Young and Hermann von Helmholtz, who also studied optics, hearing, and music. Isaac Newton expanded upon earlier mathematical developments by co-inventing calculus (independently of Leibniz). He formulated the principles of classical mechanics and conducted extensive investigations into light and optics.

Joseph Fourier developed the theory of infinite periodic series, studied heat transfer and infrared radiation, and described what later became known as the greenhouse effect. Mathematicians including Girolamo Cardano, Blaise Pascal, Pierre de Fermat, John von Neumann, Alan Turing, Aleksandr Khinchin, Andrey Markov, and Norbert Wiener made major contributions to mathematics and probability theory, including foundational work relevant to computer science, statistical mechanics, and quantum mechanics. Several mathematically inclined scientists, including Galileo, were also accomplished musicians.

Developments in medicine and biology included advances in understanding the circulation of blood, from Galen to Harvey. Some scholars and historians have argued that Christianity contributed to the rise of the Scientific Revolution.

=== Age of Enlightenment ===
During the Age of Enlightenment, Luigi Galvani, a pioneer of bioelectromagnetics, investigated what he termed "animal electricity." He observed that applying an electrical charge to the spinal cord of a frog could produce muscular spasms throughout its body. Even detached frog legs were seen to twitch when exposed to electrical stimulation. In one experiment, Galvani noted that a steel scalpel touching a brass hook holding a frog's leg caused the leg to contract.

Further experiments reinforced these observations, leading Galvani to conclude that he was witnessing a form of intrinsic electrical force within animal tissue. At the University of Pavia, his colleague Alessandro Volta replicated the results but questioned Galvani's interpretation.

Lazzaro Spallanzani was a prominent figure in experimental physiology and the natural sciences. His investigations had a lasting influence on medical science, particularly in the experimental study of bodily functions and animal reproduction.

Francesco Redi demonstrated that microorganisms could cause disease.

=== 19th century ===
Until the late 19th or early 20th century, scientists were commonly referred to as "natural philosophers" or "men of science".

English philosopher and historian of science William Whewell coined the term scientist in 1833. It first appeared in print in his anonymous 1834 review of Mary Somerville's On the Connexion of the Physical Sciences, published in the Quarterly Review.

In the review, Whewell discussed what he described as an increasing tendency toward specialization within the sciences. As highly specific terms such as chemist, mathematician, and naturalist became common, the broader term philosopher no longer adequately described those engaged in scientific study. Whewell contrasted this trend with Somerville's aim of demonstrating how distinct branches of science had historically been unified through general principles.

Whewell reported that members of the British Association for the Advancement of Science had expressed concern over the absence of a suitable collective term for "students of the knowledge of the material world." Referring indirectly to himself, he noted that "some ingenious gentleman" had proposed the word scientist by analogy with artist, arguing that similar formations such as economist and atheist were already in use. The suggestion, however, was not immediately well received.

Whewell later proposed the term again, more explicitly, in his 1840 work The Philosophy of the Inductive Sciences.

The terminations ize (rather than ise), ism, and ist, are applied to words of all origins: thus we have to pulverize, to colonize, Witticism, Heathenism, Journalist, Tobacconist. Hence we may make such words when they are wanted. As we cannot use physician for a cultivator of physics, I have called him a Physicist. We need very much a name to describe a cultivator of science in general. I should incline to call him a Scientist. Thus we might say, that as an Artist is a Musician, Painter, or Poet, a Scientist is a Mathematician, Physicist, or Naturalist.

He also proposed the term physicist as a counterpart to the French physicien. Neither term gained widespread acceptance immediately. Scientist became common in the late 19th century in the United States and around the turn of the 20th century in Great Britain.

By the twentieth century, the modern concept of science as a distinct body of knowledge, practiced by a specialized community and pursued through recognized methods, had become firmly established.

=== 20th century ===
Marie Skłodowska-Curie became the first woman to win the Nobel Prize and the first person to win it twice. Her efforts led to the development of nuclear energy and Radiotherapy for the treatment of cancer. In 1922, she was appointed a member of the International Commission on Intellectual Co-operation by the Council of the League of Nations. She campaigned for scientist's right to patent their discoveries and inventions. She also campaigned for free access to international scientific literature and for internationally recognized scientific symbols.

== Profession ==
As a profession, the scientist of today is widely recognized. However, there is no formal process to determine who is a scientist and who is not a scientist. Anyone can be a scientist in some sense. Some professions have legal requirements for their practice (e.g. licensure) and some scientists are independent scientists meaning that they practice science on their own, but to practice science there are no known licensure requirements.

=== Education ===
In modern times, many professional scientists are trained in an academic setting (e.g., universities and research institutes), mostly at the level of graduate schools. Upon completion, they would normally attain an academic degree, with the highest degree being a doctorate such as a Doctor of Philosophy (PhD). Although graduate education for scientists varies among institutions and countries, some common training requirements include specializing in an area of interest, publishing research findings in peer-reviewed scientific journals and presenting them at scientific conferences, giving lectures or teaching, and defending a thesis (or dissertation) during an oral examination. To aid them in this endeavor, graduate students often work under the guidance of a mentor, usually a senior scientist, which may continue after the completion of their doctorates whereby they work as postdoctoral researchers.

=== Career ===
After the completion of their training, many scientists pursue careers in a variety of work settings and conditions. In 2017, the British scientific journal Nature published the results of a large-scale survey of more than 5,700 doctoral students worldwide, asking them which sectors of the economy they would like to work in. A little over half of the respondents wanted to pursue a career in academia, with smaller proportions hoping to work in industry, government, and nonprofit environments.

Other motivations are recognition by their peers and prestige. The Nobel Prize, a widely regarded prestigious award, is awarded annually to those who have achieved scientific advances in the fields of medicine, physics, and chemistry.

==== Research interests ====
Scientists include experimentalists who mainly perform experiments to test hypotheses, and theoreticians who mainly develop models to explain existing data and predict new results. There is a continuum between the two activities and the division between them is not clear-cut, with many scientists performing both tasks.

Those considering science as a career often look to the frontiers. These include cosmology and biology, especially molecular biology and the human genome project. Other areas of active research include the exploration of matter at the scale of elementary particles as described by high-energy physics, and materials science, which seeks to discover and design new materials. Others choose to study brain function and neurotransmitters, which is considered by many to be the "final frontier". There are many important discoveries to make regarding the nature of the mind and human thought, much of which still remains unknown. Some scientists have a desire to apply scientific knowledge for the benefit of people's health, the nations, the world, nature, or industries (academic scientist and industrial scientist). A 2025 study found a fraction of scientists prioritize ideology over truth or report self-censorship in their work.

=== By specialization ===
==== Natural science ====
===== Physical science =====
Chemist; Agrochemist; Analytical chemist; Astrochemist; Atmospheric chemist; Biophysical chemist; Clinical chemist; Computational chemist; Electrochemist; Femtochemist; Geochemist; Green chemist; Chemical laboratory technician; Inorganic chemist; Medicinal chemist; Nuclear chemist; Organic chemist; Organometallic chemist; Pharmacologist; Physical chemist; Quantum chemist; Solid-state chemist; Stereochemist; Structural chemist; Supramolecular chemist; Theoretical chemist; Thermochemist	Earth scientist; Astrogeologist; Biogeochemist; Climatologist; Dendroarchaeologist; Dendrologist; Edaphologist; Gemologist; Geoarchaeologist; Geobiologist; Geographer; Geologist; Geomicrobiologist; Geomorphologist; Geophysicist; Glaciologist; Hydrogeologist; Hydrologist; Hydrometeorologist; Limnologist; Meteorologist; Mineralogist; Oceanographer; Paleoclimatologist; Paleoecologist; Paleogeologist; Paleoseismologist; Palynologist; Petrologist; Sedimentologist; Seismologist; Speleologist; Volcanologist	Physicist; Acoustician; Agrophysicist; Astrophysicist; Atmospheric physicist; Atomic physicist; Biological physicist; Chemical physicist; Computational physicist; Cosmologist; Condensed-matter physicist; Engineering physicist; Material physicist; Molecular physicist; Nuclear physicist; Particle physicist; Plasma physicist; Polymer physicist; Psychophysicist; Quantum physicist; Theoretical physicist	Astronomer; Planetary science; Space science; Cosmology

===== Life science =====
Biologist; Acarologist; Aerobiologist; Anatomist; Arachnologist; Astrobiologist; Bacteriologist; Bioclimatologist; Biogeographer; Bioinformatician; Biotechnologist; Bioarcheologist; Biochemist; Biolinguist; Biological anthropologist; Biophysicist; Biostatistician; Botanist; Cell biologist; Chronobiologist; Cognitive biologist; Computational biologist	Conservation biologist; Dendrochronologist; Developmental biologist; Ecologist; Electrophysiologist; Embryologist; Endocrinologist; Entomologist; Epidemiologist; Ethologist; Evolutionary biologist; Geneticist; Hematologist; Herbchronologist; Herpetologist; Histologist; Human behavioral ecologist; Human biologist	Ichnologist; Ichthyologist; Immunologist; Integrative biologist; Lepidopterist; Mammalogist; Marine biologist; Medical biologist; Microbiologist; Molecular biologist; Mycologist; Neuroendocrinologist; Neuroscientist; Neuropsychologist; Ornithologist; Osteologist; Paleoanthropologist; Paleobotanist; Paleobiologist; Paleontologist; Paleopathologist	Parasitologist; Pathologist; Physiologist; Phytopathologist; Population biologist; Primatologist; Quantum biologist; Radiobiologist; Sclerochronologist; Sociobiologist; Structural biologist; Theoretical biologist; Toxicologist; Virologist; Wildlife biologist; Zoologist

==== Social science ====
Anthropologist; Archaeologist; Cultural anthropologist; Linguistic anthropologist; Communication scientist; Criminologist; Demographer; Economist; Management scientist; Political economist; Political scientist; Linguists	Psychologist; Behavioral geneticist; Clinical psychologist; Cognitive psychologist; Developmental psychologist; Educational psychologist; Evolutionary psychologist; Experimental psychologist; Forensic psychologist; Health psychologist; Industrial and organizational psychologist; Medical psychologist; Social psychologist; Sport psychologist; Sociologist

==== Formal science ====
- Computer scientist
  - Computational scientist
  - Data scientist
- Mathematician
  - Algebraist
  - Analyst
  - Geometer
  - Logician
  - Probabilist
  - Statistician
  - Topologist
- Systems scientist

==== Applied ====
- Agriculturist
- Applied physics
  - Health physicist
  - Medical physicist
- Biomedical scientist
- Engineering scientist
- Environmental scientist
- Food scientist
- Kinesiologist
- Nutritionist
- Operations research and management analysts
- Physician scientist

==== Interdisciplinary ====
- Materials scientist
- Mathematical biologist
- Mathematical chemist
- Mathematical economist
- Mathematical physicist
- Mathematical sociologist

=== By employer ===
- Academic
- Independent scientist
- Industrial/applied scientist
- Citizen scientist
- Government scientist

== Demography ==
=== By country ===
The number of scientists is vastly different from country to country. For instance, there are only four full-time scientists per 10,000 workers in India, while this number is 79 for the United Kingdom, and 85 for the United States.

Scientists per 10,000 workers for selected countries
Nigeria: 1; Indonesia: 1; Malaysia: 2; Thailand: 2; Bangladesh: 2; Pakistan: 3	India: 4; Kenya: 6; Chile: 7; Brazil: 14; Egypt: 14	United Arab Emirates: 15; Saudi Arabia: 15; China: 18; South Africa: 20; New Zealand: 35	Spain: 54; Russia: 58; France: 68; Australia: 69; Germany: 70; Italy: 70	Canada: 73; United Kingdom: 79; Japan: 83; United States: 85; Israel: 140

==== United States ====
According to the National Science Foundation, 4.7 million people with science degrees worked in the United States in 2015, across all disciplines and employment sectors. The figure included twice as many men as women. Of that total, 17% worked in academia, that is, at universities and undergraduate institutions, and men held 53% of those positions. 5% of scientists worked for the federal government, and about 3.5% were self-employed. Of the latter two groups, two-thirds were men. 59% of scientists in the United States were employed in industry or business, and another 6% worked in non-profit positions.

== See also ==
- Engineers
- Inventor
- Researcher
- Fields Medal
- Hippocratic Oath for Scientists
- History of science
- Intellectual
- Independent scientist
- Licensure
- Mad scientist
- Natural science
- Nobel Prize
- Protoscience
- Normative science
- Pseudoscience
- Scholar
- Science
- Social science
- Women in science

Related lists

- List of engineers
- List of mathematicians
- List of Nobel laureates in Physics
- List of Nobel laureates in Chemistry
- List of Nobel laureates in Physiology or Medicine
- List of Russian scientists
- List of Roman Catholic cleric-scientists

== External articles ==
Further reading

- Alison Gopnik, "Finding Our Inner Scientist", Daedalus, Winter 2004.
- Charles George Herbermann, The Catholic Encyclopedia. Science and the Church. The Encyclopedia press, 1913. v.13. Page 598.
- Thomas Kuhn, The Structure of Scientific Revolutions, 1962.
- Arthur Jack Meadows. The Victorian Scientist: The Growth of a Profession, 2004. ISBN 0-7123-0894-6.
- Science, The Relation of Pure Science to Industrial Research. American Association for the Advancement of Science. Page 511 onwards.

Websites

- For best results, add a little inspiration – The Telegraph about What Inspired You?, a survey of key thinkers in science, technology and medicine
- Peer Review Journal Science on amateur scientists
- The philosophy of the inductive sciences, founded upon their history (1847) – Complete Text

Audio-Visual

- "The Scientist", BBC Radio 4 discussion with John Gribbin, Patricia Fara and Hugh Pennington (In Our Time, Oct. 24, 2002)
