= Laboratory manager =

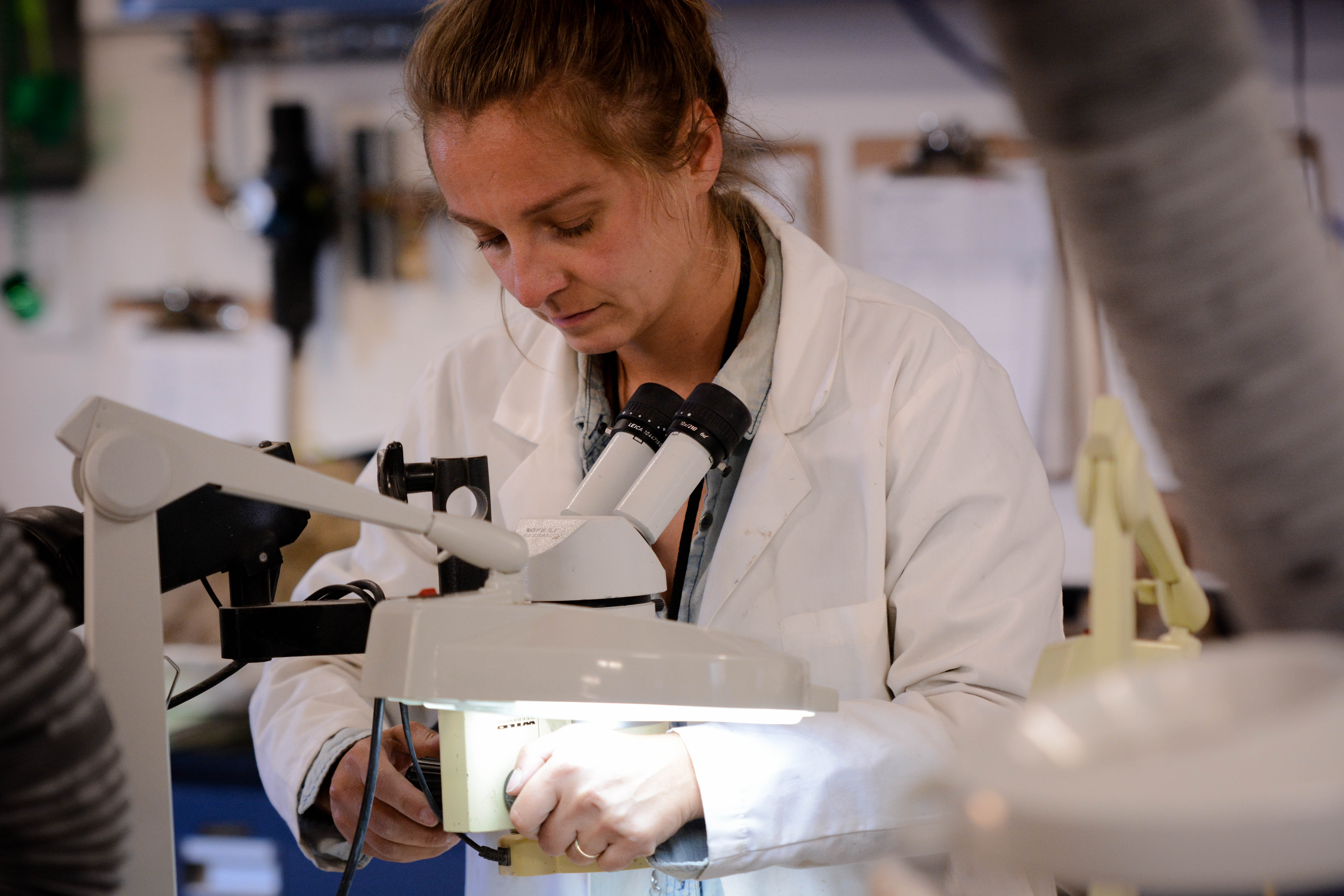
- Katja Knoll, lab manager at the Grand Staircase-Escalante National Monument Paleontology Laboratory.

Occupation
- Synonyms: Laboratory supervisor Laboratory coordinator Staff scientist
- Occupation type: Profession

Description
- Fields of employment: Academia, industry, government
- Related jobs: Scientist; Engineer

A laboratory manager (alternatively laboratory supervisor) is an individual who supervises personnel and operations in a laboratory environment; the position is senior to that of a laboratory technician or laboratory technologist, and is considered a middle-management occupation.

== Nature of work ==
While the duties of laboratory managers depend on their particular field or industry, they generally direct or coordinate scientific research and related activities such as quality control, along with ensuring laboratories have the necessary equipment and materials to sustain operations. Depending on the size of the company or academic institution, the scope of a manager's responsibilities also varies. At a senior level, a laboratory manager may be an administrator primarily responsible for budgets, hiring and supervising scientific and technical personnel, and working with senior management to develop goals and strategies for the organization. Laboratory managers or supervisors at this level may be responsible for managing large teams.

Some laboratory managers are current or former scientists who are sometimes called "working managers," and who participate in conducting research in addition to administrative duties, mentoring students, and assisting other researchers. Managers in this category are commonly known as staff scientists. Chemistry laboratory managers may also be chemical hygiene officers responsible for occupational health and safety. In academic institutions, there may be different categories of laboratory managers, who may also be known as laboratory coordinators, and who may teach laboratory or lecture courses as needed.

Regardless of designation, laboratory safety is a primary responsibility of scientific laboratory managers. The manager or supervisor is responsible for ensuring laboratories are in compliance with established regulations and standards.

== Qualifications ==
Laboratory managers need excellent leadership, interpersonal, critical-thinking, problem-solving, and time-management abilities. Usually, though not always, they must have a university degree, along with several years of laboratory experience as a scientist, engineer or laboratory technician or assistant. Most laboratory managers hold a bachelor of science degree. Management of research laboratories, including pharmaceutical and biotechnology laboratories, usually requires a master's degree or doctorate. Some positions require a Professional Science Master's or a Master of Business Administration degree.
