= Laboratory technician =

Profession

An Iranian laboratory technician at work

A laboratory technician or (informally) lab tech is a person who works in a laboratory performing analytical or experimental procedures, maintaining laboratory equipment. They can be involved in the medical field such as phlebotomists or the supply chain, in which they can be known as production lab technicians, inventory lab technicians or laboratory inventory specialists.

According to the Oxford English Dictionary, the first use of the term laboratory technician was in 1896:

It [sc. a therapeutic property] is now totally abandoned by the advanced laboratory technicians.

The term is now widely accepted. Laboratory technicians are found in a wide range of scientific fields, including forensic science, pathology, chemistry, biomedical science and physics. Laboratory technicians may hold a range of formal academic qualifications, such as associate degrees, often obtained through vocational education. They are usually supervised by laboratory managers.
