= Government scientist =

Scientist employed by a country or other jurisdiction's government

A government scientist is a scientist employed by a country's government, either in a research-driven job (for example J. Robert Oppenheimer on the Manhattan Project), or for another role that requires scientific training and methods. In some countries other terms, such as Technical officers, is also used for scientists.

== Australia ==
In Australia, most government scientists are employed by the Commonwealth Scientific and Industrial Research Organisation. A Chief Scientist is appointed to advise the government through the Office of the Chief Scientist.

== Singapore ==
In Singapore, government scientists are classified according to the Departmental Titles (Alteration) (Amendment) Act 1996, which amended the Departmental Titles (Alteration) Ordinance of 1950.

== United Kingdom ==
In the United Kingdom, government scientists are part of the Scientific Civil Service. However, that was not always the case. Before the Second World War, government scientists were recruited and employed by the Civil Service on an ad hoc basis, with grades, job titles, and organizations that varied between departments. In 1930, the Carpenter Committee was appointed to investigate the organization of civil service scientific and technical staff, and its report proposed a reorganization that covered the entire Service. This report was endorsed by the Tomlin Commission, however it was impossible to reach agreement with the relevant staff associations, who wanted other professional groups within the civil service to be similarly reorganized, and nothing ended up happening.

World War Two changed this by causing a far greater number of scientific and technical staff to be employed by the government. The Barlow Committee on Scientific Staff in Government Departments reviewed the positions of government scientists during wartime, issuing a report on 1943-04-23. This report spurred the creation of a government white paper, entitled The Scientific Civil Service, which resulted in a reorganization of government scientists across the entire Service. This reorganization classified government scientists across the entire Service into three major classes similar to those civil servants for the Treasury had already been classified in:

Scientific Officer class
Grades of scientific officer began with Scientific Officer, and progressed through Senior, Principal, Senior Principal, Deputy Chief, and Chief Scientific Officers.
Experimental Officer class
Grades of experimental officer began with Assistant Experimental Officer, and progressed through Experimental Officer to Senior and then Chief Experimental Officers. Experimental officers were either university graduates or people who had qualifications such as the Higher National Certificate, and were support staff for Scientific Officers.
Scientific Assistant class
This class of civil servant undertook the routine work, and was largely equivalent to the Treasury's Clerical Class.

== United States ==
In the United States, the employment of scientists by state and federal governments was, like in the U.K., affected by the Second World War. President Roosevelt first created the National Defense Research Committee under Vannevar Bush. This was then expanded to the Office of Scientific Research and Development, also led by Bush. The OSRD employed scientists on a contract basis, with the OSRD as client and individual scientists as contractors. Scientists were contracted to research (through study and experiment) a specified subject, without constraints as to method, and to issue reports to the OSRD.

After the war, scientific research was continued by agencies such as the Office of Naval Research established in 1947, which again employed scientists as contractors. Scientific research was published in the normal way. The Atomic Energy Commission, established in 1946, and the National Institutes of Health, established in 1930, also paid scientists for scientific research, and were major sources of government research funding.

The National Science Foundation was eventually established in 1950. Defence research was explicitly excluded from its charter, even though Dr Bush had originally envisioned the NSF as including that as well. The armed forces established their own research departments, such as the Office of Ordnance Research for the Department of the Army, established on the campus of Duke University in June 1951.

U.S. local, state, and federal governments also employ scientists directly. The federal government employs them in departments such as the Department of Agriculture, Department of the Interior, and the Public Health Service. States and cities employ scientists in similar roles, including at fish and game commissions, parks, aquariums, arboretums, and museums; and at agencies such as environmental inspection agencies, crime laboratories, and public health monitoring agencies.
