= List of companions of the Order of Canada =

Companions of the Order of Canada, the highest level of the Order of Canada, have demonstrated the highest degree of merit to Canada and humanity, on the national or international scene. Up to 15 companions are appointed each year, with a limit of 180 living companions at any given time. Companions are entitled to use the post-nominal "CC". As of September 19, 2020, there were 136 living companions (including two honorary). This list shows all of the companions, in alphabetical order, both living and deceased.

== List ==
Name	Birth year	Death year	Appointment date	Investiture date	Comments
Rosalie Silberman Abella	1946		December 31, 2025		
Aga Khan IV	1936	2025	October 29, 2004	June 6, 2005	Honorary appointment
John Black Aird	1923	1995	October 21, 1992	April 21, 1993	Member of the Order of Ontario
Pierrette Alarie	1921	2011	November 15, 1995	October 8, 1996	Knight of the National Order of Quebec
Lincoln Alexander	1922	2012	April 30, 1992	October 21, 1992	Member of the Order of Ontario
Jean Victor Allard	1913	1996	June 28, 1968	November 12, 1968	Commander of the Order of the British Empire; Grand Officer of the National Order of Quebec
Stacey Ann Allaster	1963		June 29, 2022	October 3, 2024	
Howard Alper	1941		November 27, 2020	November 3, 2022	Promotion within the order
Doris Anderson	1921	2007	May 1, 2002	February 21, 2003	
Brenda Andrews	1957		December 30, 2015	September 23, 2016	
Louis Applebaum	1918	2000	November 15, 1995	February 15, 1996	
Louise Arbour	1947		October 25, 2007	October 10, 2008	Grand Officer of the National Order of Quebec 31st Governor General of Canada
Denys Arcand	1941		October 29, 2004	June 10, 2005	Knight of the National Order of Quebec
Edgar Archibald	1885	1968	July 6, 1967	November 24, 1967	
Eric Arthur	1898	1982	December 20, 1968	April 8, 1969	
James Arthur	1944		December 27, 2018	July 4, 2019	
Kenojuak Ashevak	1927	2013	June 21, 1982	October 20, 1982	Member of the Order of Nunavut
Margaret Atwood	1939		June 22, 1981	November 6, 1988	
Lloyd Axworthy	1939		December 30, 2015	February 17, 2017	
Edwin Baker	1893	1968	July 6, 1967	November 24, 1967	
Charles Band	1885	1969	May 26, 1969	October 28, 1969	
Marius Barbeau	1883	1969	July 6, 1967	November 24, 1967	
Lloyd Barber	1932	2011	April 22, 1993	October 27, 1993	Member of the Saskatchewan Order of Merit
Henry J. M. Barnett	1922	2016	May 8, 2003	December 12, 2003	
John W. H. Bassett	1915	1998	April 30, 1992	April 21, 1993	Member of the Order of Ontario
Michel Bastarache	1947		May 25, 2009	April 7, 2010	
Thomas J. Bata	1914	2008	December 17, 1971	April 12, 1972	
Iain Baxter&	1936		June 27, 2019	September 4, 2019	Member of the Order of Ontario; Member of the Order of British Columbia
Laurent Beaudoin	1938		November 17, 1988	April 12, 1989	Officer of the National Order of Quebec
Jean Beetz	1927	1991	April 20, 1989	October 18, 1989	
Monique Bégin	1936	2023	November 27, 2020	September 6, 2022	Promotion within the order
Michel Bélanger	1929	1997	October 27, 1993	April 13, 1994	
Jean Béliveau	1931	2014	May 6, 1998	October 22, 1998	Grand Officer of the National Order of Quebec
Robert Edward Bell	1918	1992	December 17, 1971	April 12, 1972	
Agnes Benidickson	1920	2007	October 23, 1997	February 4, 1998	Member of the Order of Ontario
Avie Bennett	1928	2017	October 30, 2003	May 14, 2004	Member of the Order of Ontario
Mario Bernardi	1930	2013	June 23, 1972	October 25, 1972	
Alan Bernstein	1947		June 30, 2023		Promotion within the Order
Pierre Berton	1920	2004	June 23, 1986	November 12, 1986	Member of the Order of Ontario
Claude Bertrand	1917	2014	June 25, 1971	October 29, 1971	
Janette Bertrand	1925		November 27, 2020	October 20, 2022	Promotion within the order Knight of the National Order of Quebec
Charles Best	1899	1978	December 22, 1967	November 12, 1968	Member of the Order of the Companions of Honour; Commander of the Order of the British Empire
Ian Binnie	1939		May 24, 2012	November 23, 2012	
Florence Bird	1908	1998	December 22, 1967	November 12, 1968	
Claude Bissell	1916	2000	December 19, 1969	April 21, 1970	
S. Robert Blair	1929	2009	June 24, 1985	October 30, 1985	
Marie-Claire Blais	1939	2021	June 23, 1972		Officer of the National Order of Quebec
Roger Blais	1926	2009	May 1, 2002	February 21, 2003	Officer of the National Order of Quebec
Jean Sutherland Boggs	1922	2014	April 30, 1992	October 21, 1992	
Pierre Boivin	1953		December 18, 2024		Promotion within the Order; Knight of the National Order of Quebec
Roberta Bondar	1945		June 29, 2018	May 8, 2019	Member of the Order of Ontario
Gerald Bouey	1920	2004	June 29, 1987	October 28, 1987	
Boutros Boutros-Ghali	1922	2016	May 8, 2003	May 7, 2004	Honorary appointment
William Boyd	1885	1979	December 20, 1968	April 8, 1969	
Willard Boyle	1924	2011	May 6, 2010	November 17, 2010	
John Ross Bradfield	1899	1983	June 19, 1973	August 2, 1973	
John Louis Bragg	1940		December 29, 2022	October 26, 2023	Promotion within the Order
François-Philippe Brais	1894	1972	June 26, 1970	November 20, 1970	
Simon Brault	1955		December 31, 2025		Promotion within the Order; Officer of the National Order of Quebec
Yvette Brind'Amour	1918	1992	June 21, 1982	October 20, 1982	Officer of the National Order of Quebec
Ed Broadbent	1936	2024	October 18, 2001	August 31, 2002	
Bertram Brockhouse	1918	2003	May 4, 1995	February 15, 1996	
Charles Bronfman	1931		April 30, 1992	October 21, 1992	
Samuel Bronfman	1891	1971	December 22, 1967	April 26, 1968	
Robert Bryce	1910	1997	December 20, 1968	April 8, 1969	
E. L. M. Burns	1897	1985	July 6, 1967	November 24, 1967	Officer of the Order of the British Empire
Marcel Cadieux	1915	1981	December 19, 1969	April 21, 1970	
Morley Callaghan	1903	1990	December 20, 1982	April 20, 1983	
June Callwood	1924	2007	November 15, 2000	May 31, 2001	Member of the Order of Ontario
James Cameron	1954		December 27, 2019	February 22, 2024	
Kim Campbell	1947		April 10, 2008	September 3, 2010	19th Prime Minister of Canada
Thane Campbell	1895	1978	June 19, 1973	August 2, 1973	19th Premier of Prince Edward Island
Gerald Emmett Carter	1912	2003	December 20, 1982	April 20, 1983	
John Robert Cartwright	1895	1979	June 26, 1970	October 28, 1970	12th Chief Justice of Canada
Thérèse Casgrain	1896	1981	December 18, 1974	April 16, 1975	Officer of the Order of the British Empire
Claude Castonguay	1929	2020	December 18, 1974	April 16, 1975	Officer of the National Order of Quebec
Raffi Cavoukian	1948		December 31, 2025		Promotion within the Order; Member of the Order of British Columbia
Clifford Chadderton	1919	2013	October 21, 1998	February 3, 1999	Member of the Order of Ontario
Floyd Chalmers	1898	1993	December 17, 1984	April 10, 1985	
Joan Chalmers	1928	2016	October 23, 1997	May 7, 1998	Member of the Order of Ontario
Gretta Chambers	1927	2017	April 27, 2000	May 7, 1998	Officer of the National Order of Quebec
Louise Charron	1951		November 19, 2012	May 3, 2013	
Charles III	1948		May 11, 2017	July 1, 2017	Sovereign of the Order of Canada; Extraordinary Companion (as Prince of Wales)
Lionel Chevrier	1903	1987	December 22, 1967	April 26, 1968	
Ludmilla Chiriaeff	1924	1996	June 25, 1984	October 3, 1984	Grand Officer of the National Order of Quebec
Brock Chisholm	1896	1971	July 6, 1967	November 5, 1968	
Fernand Choquette	1895	1975	December 22, 1972	April 11, 1973	
Robert Choquette	1905	1991	December 20, 1968	April 8, 1969	Grand Officer of the National Order of Quebec
Jean Chrétien	1934		May 3, 2007	February 22, 2008	20th Prime Minister of Canada; Member of the Order of Merit
Raymond Chrétien	1942		December 27, 2019	October 20, 2022	Promotion within the order
Joe Clark	1939		October 19, 1994	May 3, 1995	16th Prime Minister of Canada; Member of the Alberta Order of Excellence
Howard Clark	1903	1983	June 26, 1970	October 28, 1970	
Adrienne Clarkson	1939		September 28, 1999	September 28, 1999	26th Governor General of Canada
Gilles Cloutier	1928	2014	October 27, 1993	February 16, 1994	Officer of the National Order of Quebec
John Clyne	1902	1989	December 22, 1972	April 11, 1973	
Reuben Cohen	1921	2014	October 18, 2001	February 22, 2002	Member of the Order of New Brunswick
Leonard Cohen	1934	2016	October 10, 2002	October 24, 2003	Grand Officer of the National Order of Quebec
George Cohon	1937	2023	December 27, 2019	August 25, 2023	Promotion within the Order.
Major James Coldwell	1888	1974	July 6, 1967	November 24, 1967	
Alex Colville	1920	2013	December 14, 1981	April 21, 1982	Member of the Order of Nova Scotia
Harold Copp	1915	1998	June 23, 1980	April 8, 1981	
Clément Cormier	1910	1987	June 23, 1972	October 25, 1972	
James Corry	1899	1985	June 28, 1968	November 12, 1968	
Peter Cory	1925	2020	May 1, 2002	November 30, 2002	
Harold Scott MacDonald Coxeter	1907	2003	April 17, 1997	October 22, 1997	
Purdy Crawford	1931	2014	May 3, 2007	April 11, 2008	
Donald Creighton	1902	1979	July 6, 1967	November 24, 1967	
Paul-André Crépeau	1926	2011	April 30, 1992	October 21, 1992	Officer of the National Order of Quebec
Thomas Crerar	1876	1975	December 17, 1973	December 17, 1973	
Thomas Cromwell	1952		December 29, 2017	March 14, 2019	
David Cronenberg	1943		May 8, 2014	May 8, 2015	Member of the Order of Ontario
Richard Cruess	1929		May 8, 2014	September 12, 2014	Member of the National Order of Quebec
Buck Crump	1904	1989	June 25, 1971	April 12, 1972	
E. M. Culliton	1906	1991	June 22, 1981	October 21, 1981	
David Culver	1924	2017	July 11, 1988	November 8, 1988	Officer of the National Order of Quebec
Balfour Currie	1902	1981	June 23, 1972	June 23, 1972	
Camille Dagenais	1920	2016	December 20, 1982	April 20, 1983	Officer of the National Order of Quebec
Roy Daniells	1902	1979	December 17, 1971	April 12, 1972	
Pierre Dansereau	1911	2011	December 19, 1969	October 28, 1970	Grand Officer of the National Order of Quebec
Barney Danson	1921	2011	May 3, 2007	October 2, 2008	
Paul David	1919	1999	December 14, 1981	April 21, 1982	Grand Officer of the National Order of Quebec
George Forrester Davidson	1909	1995	December 22, 1972	October 24, 1973	
Robertson Davies	1913	1995	December 22, 1972	April 11, 1973	Member of the Order of Ontario
Bill Davis	1929	2021	December 23, 1985	April 9, 1986	18th Premier of Ontario; Member of the Order of Ontario
Natalie Zemon Davis	1928	2023	June 29, 2012	September 28, 2012	
John de Chastelain	1937		May 8, 2014	November 21, 2014	Companion of Honour; Commander of the Order of Military Merit; Commander of the Order of St. John
A. Jean de Grandpré	1921	2022	June 29, 1987	October 28, 1987	
Louis-Philippe de Grandpré	1917	2008	December 17, 1971	April 12, 1972	Grand Officer of the National Order of Quebec
Robert Defries	1889	1975	June 26, 1970	October 28, 1970	Commander of the Order of the British Empire
Rock Demers	1933	2021	May 3, 2007	February 22, 2008	
Marie Deschamps	1952		November 21, 2013	September 12, 2014	
Jules Deschênes	1923	2000	October 21, 1992	October 27, 1993	
Paul Desmarais	1927	2013	December 29, 1986	April 29, 1987	Officer of the National Order of Quebec
John James Deutsch	1911	1976	June 27, 1969	October 28, 1969	
Jacques Dextraze	1911	1993	January 11, 1978	April 19, 1978	Commander of the Order of Military Merit; Commander of the Order of the British Empire
Jack Diamond	1909	2001	November 15, 2000	December 4, 2001	Member of the Order of British Columbia
Brian Dickson	1916	1998	October 25, 1990	April 17, 1991	15th Chief Justice of Canada
Celine Dion	1968		October 23, 2008	July 26, 2013	Officer of the National Order of Quebec
Ford Doolittle	1941		June 30, 2025		
Tommy Douglas	1904	1986	June 22, 1981	October 21, 1981	Member of the Saskatchewan Order of Merit
Charles George Drake	1920	1998	May 6, 1998	August 19, 1998	Member of the Order of Ontario
Jean Drapeau	1916	1999	July 6, 1967	November 24, 1967	Grand Officer of the National Order of Quebec
George A. Drew	1894	1973	December 22, 1967	April 26, 1968	14th Premier of Ontario
Richard Drouin	1932		October 5, 2006	May 4, 2007	Officer of the National Order of Quebec
Davidson Dunton	1912	1987	December 18, 1970	March 31, 1971	
Pierre Dupuy	1896	1969	December 22, 1967	April 24, 1968	
Atom Egoyan	1960		December 30, 2015	February 17, 2017	
Queen Elizabeth The Queen Mother	1900	2002	August 1, 2000	October 31, 2000	Honorary appointment
Arthur Erickson	1924	2009	December 14, 1981	April 21, 1982	
Willard Estey	1919	2002	April 20, 1990	October 24, 1990	
John Robert Evans	1929	2015	January 11, 1978	October 24, 1979	Member of the Order of Ontario
Ellen Fairclough	1905	2004	October 19, 1994	March 1, 1995	Member of the Order of Ontario
Marcel Faribault	1908	1972	June 25, 1971	October 29, 1971	
Gérald Fauteux	1900	1980	June 26, 1974	December 6, 1974	13th Chief Justice of Canada
Denise Filiatrault	1931		November 27, 2020	May 3, 2024	Promotion within the order Member of the National Order of Quebec
Gérard Filion	1909	2005	December 18, 1970	March 31, 1971	Grand Officer of the National Order of Quebec
Morris Fish	1938		December 30, 2016	February 17, 2017	
George Bernard Flahiff	1905	1989	June 26, 1974	December 6, 1974	
James Fleck	1931		November 20, 2014	February 13, 2015	
Ross Flemington	1897	1971	June 25, 1971	October 29, 1971	
Robert Ford	1915	1998	December 17, 1971	July 21, 1972	
Maureen Forrester	1930	2010	July 6, 1967	November 24, 1967	Officer of the National Order of Quebec
Eugene Forsey	1904	1991	November 17, 1988	April 12, 1989	
Claude Fortier	1921	1986	December 18, 1970	March 31, 1971	
Yves Fortier	1935		April 19, 1991	October 30, 1991	Officer of the National Order of Quebec
Charles Foulkes	1903	1969	December 20, 1968	April 8, 1969	Companion of the Order of the Bath; Commander of the Order of the British Empire
Michael Andrew Fox	1961		April 17, 2026	June 26,2026	Promotion within the Order
Terry Fox	1958	1981	September 14, 1980	September 19, 1980	Member of the Order of the Dogwood; Youngest ever Companion
Celia Franca	1921	2007	June 24, 1985	October 30, 1985	Member of the Order of Ontario
Ruth Frankel	1903	1989	June 27, 1969	October 28, 1969	
Ursula Franklin	1921	2016	October 21, 1992	April 21, 1993	Member of the Order of Ontario
Armand Frappier	1904	1991	June 27, 1969	October 28, 1969	Officer of the Order of the British Empire; Grand Officer of the National Order of Quebec
Whit Fraser	1942		July 22, 2021	July 22, 2021	Spouse of the 30th Governor General of Canada
Rowland Frazee	1921	2007	April 19, 1991	October 30, 1991	
Martin Friedland	1932		October 30, 2003	October 30, 2004	
Henry Friesen	1934	2025	May 30, 2001	May 9, 2003	Member of the Order of Manitoba
Leslie Frost	1895	1973	June 27, 1969	October 28, 1969	16th Premier of Ontario
Northrop Frye	1912	1991	June 23, 1972	October 25, 1972	
William Fyfe	1927	2013	April 20, 1989	October 18, 1989	
Walter Gage	1922	1978	June 25, 1971	October 29, 1971	
George Alexander Gale	1906	1997	July 11, 1977	October 26, 1977	
Mavis Gallant	1922	2014	October 21, 1992	October 27, 1993	
Marc Garneau	1949	2025	May 8, 2003	December 12, 2003	Promotion within the Order
Stuart Garson	1898	1977	June 25, 1971	November 16, 1972	
Clément Gascon	1960		June 30, 2023	October 3, 2024	
Jean Gascon	1920	1988	June 25, 1975	April 7, 1978	
Roger Gaudry	1913	2001	December 20, 1968	April 8, 1969	Grand Officer of the National Order of Quebec
William-Henry Gauvin	1913	1994	June 25, 1975	October 15, 1975	
Frank Gehry	1929	2025	November 12, 2002	June 16, 2003	Originally Honorary Appointment; Became Canadian Citizen in 2003
Arthur Gelber	1915	1998	October 19, 1994	March 1, 1995	
Gratien Gélinas	1909	1999	October 23, 1989	April 18, 1990	Knight of the National Order of Quebec
Pierre Gendron	1916	1984	June 26, 1970	October 28, 1970	
Jacques Genest	1919	2018	December 22, 1967	April 26, 1968	Grand Officer of the National Order of Quebec
Leo Gerard	1947		June 30, 2023	October 3, 2024	
Paul Gérin-Lajoie	1920	2018	June 25, 1979	April 16, 1980	Grand Officer of the National Order of Quebec
Reva Gerstein	1917	2020	October 23, 1997	February 4, 1998	Member of the Order of Ontario
Paul-Antoine Giguère	1910	1987	June 26, 1970	October 28, 1970	
Gustave Gingras	1918	1996	June 23, 1972	October 25, 1972	
Émile Girardin	1895	1982	June 27, 1969	October 28, 1969	
Roland Giroux	1913	1991	July 11, 1977	October 26, 1977	
Phil Gold	1936		December 23, 1985	April 9, 1986	Officer of the National Order of Quebec
Victor Goldbloom	1923	2016	April 27, 2000	November 16, 2000	Officer of the National Order of Quebec
Nicholas Goldschmidt	1908	2004	April 20, 1989	October 18, 1989	
Charles Gonthier	1928	2009	May 3, 2007	February 22, 2008	
Donald Gordon	1901	1969	June 28, 1968	November 12, 1968	Companion of the Order of St Michael and St George
Walter L. Gordon	1906	1987	June 23, 1976	October 20, 1976	
Joseph Gosnell	1936	2020	October 5, 2006	May 4, 2007	Member of the Order of British Columbia
Allan Gotlieb	1928	2020	December 21, 1987	April 19, 1991	
Duncan Archibald Graham	1882	1974	June 28, 1968	November 12, 1968	
Alain Grandbois	1900	1975	December 22, 1967	April 26, 1968	
Herb Gray	1931	2014	May 8, 2003	February 20, 2004	
James Lorne Gray	1913	1987	December 19, 1969	April 21, 1970	
Wayne Gretzky	1961		May 25, 2009		
Roger Guindon	1920	2012	December 17, 1973	April 3, 1974	Member of the Order of Ontario
Peter Gzowski	1934	2002	October 21, 1998	February 3, 1999	
Ian Hacking	1936	2023	May 13, 2004	March 11, 2005	
Emmett Matthew Hall	1898	1995	December 18, 1974	April 16, 1975	
Francess Halpenny	1919	2017	June 25, 1984	October 3, 1984	
Rick Hansen	1957		June 29, 1987	March 29, 1988	Member of the Order of British Columbia
Kenneth Hare	1919	2002	June 29, 1987	October 28, 1987	Member of the Order of Ontario
Stephen Harper	1959		December 27, 2019	September 18, 2022	22nd Prime Minister
Lawren Harris	1885	1970	December 19, 1969	October 28, 1970	
James M. Harrison	1915	1990	December 17, 1971	April 12, 1972	
Evelyn Hart	1956		April 13, 1994	August 22, 1997	Member of the Order of Manitoba
Václav Havel	1936	2011	May 8, 2003	March 3, 2004	Honorary appointment
Frank Hawthorne	1946		December 29, 2017	November 20, 2018	
Frank Joseph Hayden	1930	2026	June 29, 2022	November 17, 2022	Promotion within the order
Anne Hébert	1916	2000	June 28, 1968	April 8, 1969	Officer of the National Order of Quebec
Arnold Heeney	1902	1970	June 28, 1968	November 12, 1968	
Gordon Henderson	1912	1993	July 11, 1988	November 8, 1988	
Martha Henry	1938	2021	October 25, 1990	April 17, 1991	Member of the Order of Ontario
Ben Heppner	1956		October 23, 2008	September 3, 2010	
Peter Herrndorf	1940	2023	May 11, 2017	January 24, 2018	
Gerhard Herzberg	1904	1999	June 28, 1968	November 12, 1968	
Angela Hewitt	1958		December 30, 2015	May 8, 2019	
Henry Hicks	1915	1990	June 26, 1970	October 28, 1970	
Geoffrey Hinton	1947		December 27, 2018	December 16, 2020	
Lotta Hitschmanova	1909	1990	December 17, 1979	October 15, 1980	
Gerda Hnatyshyn	1935	2023	January 10, 1990	January 29, 1990	Wife of the 24th Governor General of Canada
Ray Hnatyshyn	1934	2002	January 10, 1990	January 29, 1990	24th Governor General of Canada
Helen Sawyer Hogg	1905	1993	June 23, 1976	October 20, 1976	
Peter Hogg	1939	2020	May 8, 2003	February 20, 2004	
Harley Hotchkiss	1927	2011	May 25, 2009	November 5, 2009	Member of the Alberta Order of Excellence
William Hutt	1920	2007	December 19, 1969	October 28, 1970	Member of the Order of Ontario
Frank Iacobucci	1937		May 3, 2007	April 11, 2008	
George Ignatieff	1913	1989	December 17, 1973	April 3, 1974	
Richard M. Ivey	1925	2019	April 27, 2000	February 28, 2001	
A. Y. Jackson	1882	1974	December 22, 1967	April 26, 1968	Companion of the Order of St Michael and St George
Tom Jackson	1948		November 27, 2020	November 17, 2022	Promotion within the order
Stephen A. Jarislowsky	1925	2026	October 23, 2008	November 5, 2009	Grand Officer of the National Order of Quebec
Michaëlle Jean	1957		September 27, 2005	September 27, 2005	27th Governor General of Canada
Diamond Jenness	1886	1969	December 20, 1968	March 25, 1970	
Norman Jewison	1926	2024	November 1, 1991	April 29, 1992	Member of the Order of Ontario
Raoul Jobin	1906	1974	July 6, 1967	November 24, 1967	
Albert Wesley Johnson	1923	2010	November 14, 1996	April 16, 1997	
David Lloyd Johnston	1941		October 23, 1997	May 7, 1998	28th Governor General of Canada
Sharon Johnston	1943		September 1, 2010	September 5, 2010	Spouse of the 28th Governor General of Canada
Serge Joyal	1945		December 28, 2023		Promotion within the Order; Officer of the National Order of Quebec
Wilfred Judson	1902	1980	July 4, 1978	October 18, 1978	
Karen Kain	1951		April 19, 1991	October 30, 1991	
Victoria Kaspi	1967		December 30, 2016	May 10, 2018	
Yousuf Karsh	1908	2002	April 20, 1990	October 24, 1990	
Hugh Llewellyn Keenleyside	1898	1992	December 19, 1969	April 21, 1970	
Roy Kellock	1893	1975	December 18, 1970	March 31, 1971	
Thomas Worrall Kent	1922	2011	May 30, 2001	October 17, 2001	
Larkin Kerwin	1924	2004	December 15, 1980	April 8, 1981	Officer of the National Order of Quebec
Shaf Keshavjee	1961		December 31, 2025		Promotion within the Order; Member of the Order of Ontario
Thomas King	1943		November 27, 2020	June 14, 2023	Promotion within the order
Raymond Klibansky	1905	2005	April 27, 2000	November 16, 2000	Grand Officer of the National Order of Quebec
Walter Koerner	1898	1995	July 6, 1967	November 24, 1967	Member of the Order of British Columbia
Arthur Kroeger	1932	2008	April 27, 2000	February 28, 2001	
Claire L'Heureux-Dubé	1927		May 8, 2003	December 12, 2003	Grand Officer of the National Order of Quebec
Gérard La Forest	1926	2025	April 27, 2000	November 16, 2000	
Huguette Labelle	1939		May 30, 2001	February 22, 2002	Member of the Order of Ontario
Luc Lacourcière	1910	1989	December 18, 1970	March 31, 1971	
Jean-Daniel Lafond	1944		September 27, 2005	September 27, 2005	Spouse of the 27th Governor General of Canada
Phyllis Lambert	1927		October 18, 2001	August 31, 2002	Grand Officer of the National Order of Quebec
Antonio Lamer	1933	2007	November 15, 2000	February 28, 2001	16th Chief Justice of Canada
Roger Landry	1934	2020	November 14, 1996	February 26, 1997	Officer of the National Order of Quebec
Robert Langlands	1936		June 27, 2019	November 21, 2019	
Renaude Lapointe	1912	2002	April 20, 1989	October 18, 1989	
Bora Laskin	1912	1984	March 13, 1984	October 3, 1984	14th Chief Justice of Canada
Margaret Laurence	1926	1987	December 17, 1971	June 27, 1972	
Gerald Le Dain	1924	2007	October 23, 1989	April 18, 1990	
Louis LeBel	1939	2023	December 29, 2017	November 20, 2018	
Diana Fowler LeBlanc	1940		January 23, 1995	January 23, 1995	Spouse of the 25th Governor General of Canada
Roméo LeBlanc	1927	2009	January 23, 1995	January 23, 1995	25th Governor General of Canada; Member of the Order of New Brunswick
Charles Philippe Leblond	1910	2007	October 21, 1999	February 9, 2000	Grand Officer of the National Order of Quebec
Maurice LeClair	1927	2020	December 23, 1985	April 9, 1986	
Gabrielle Léger	1917	1998	January 14, 1974	January 14, 1974	Spouse of the 21st Governor General of Canada
Jules Léger	1913	1980	June 19, 1973	June 19, 1973	21st Governor General of Canada
Paul-Émile Léger	1904	1991	June 28, 1968	October 28, 1969	Grand Officer of the National Order of Quebec
Robert Legget	1904	1994	October 23, 1989	April 18, 1990	
Roger Lemelin	1919	1992	June 23, 1980	October 15, 1980	Officer of the National Order of Quebec
Jean Paul Lemieux	1904	1990	June 28, 1968	November 12, 1968	Grand Officer of the National Order of Quebec
Raymond Lemieux	1920	2000	April 13, 1994	May 3, 1995	Member of the Alberta Order of Excellence
Robert Lepage	1957		May 25, 2009	November 4, 2011	Officer of the National Order of Quebec
Monique F. Leroux	1954		July 27, 2024		Promotion within the order Officer of the National Order of Quebec
Jean Lesage	1912	1980	December 18, 1970	March 31, 1971	19th Premier of Quebec
Georges-Henri Lévesque	1903	2000	June 25, 1979	October 24, 1979	Officer of the National Order of Quebec
Eugene Levy	1946		December 29, 2022		Promotion within the Order
David Lewis	1909	1981	December 15, 1976	April 20, 1977	
Stephen Lewis	1937	2026	October 10, 2002	October 24, 2003	
Bennett Lewis	1908	1987	December 22, 1967	April 26, 1968	Commander of the Order of the British Empire
Gordon Lightfoot	1938	2023	May 8, 2003	December 13, 2003	Member of the Order of Ontario
Arthur Lismer	1885	1969	July 6, 1967	November 24, 1967	
J. Wilton Littlechild	1944		December 28, 2023	October 3, 2024	Promotion within the Order; Member of the Alberta Order of Excellence
Charles Locke	1887	1980	June 25, 1971	October 29, 1971	
Barbara Sherwood Lollar	1963		May 12, 2016	November 17, 2016	
Bernard Lonergan	1904	1984	December 18, 1970	March 31, 1971	
Peter Lougheed	1928	2012	December 29, 1986	April 29, 1987	10th Premier of Alberta; Member of the Alberta Order of Excellence
Arthur R. M. Lower	1889	1988	December 20, 1968	April 8, 1969	
John MacAulay	1895	1978	July 6, 1967	November 24, 1967	
Brian Macdonald	1928	2014	October 18, 2001	October 26, 2002	
Donald Stovel Macdonald	1932	2018	April 13, 1994	October 19, 1994	
Flora MacDonald	1926	2015	October 21, 1998	April 14, 1999	Member of the Order of Ontario; Member of the Order of Nova Scotia
Ronald St. John Macdonald	1928	2006	April 27, 2000	October 26, 2002	
James MacDonnell	1884	1973	December 22, 1967	April 26, 1968	
Jack Mackenzie	1888	1984	July 6, 1967	November 24, 1967	Companion of the Order of St Michael and St George
Norman MacKenzie	1894	1986	June 27, 1969	October 28, 1969	Companion of the Order of St Michael and St George
William Archibald Mackintosh	1895	1970	July 6, 1967	November 24, 1967	
Hugh MacLennan	1907	1990	July 6, 1967	November 24, 1967	Knight of the National Order of Quebec
Ernest MacMillan	1893	1973	June 27, 1969	November 19, 1969	Knight Bachelor
H. R. MacMillan	1885	1976	December 18, 1970	March 31, 1971	Commander of the Order of the British Empire
Margaret MacMillan	1943		December 30, 2015	May 10, 2018	Companion of Honour; Member of the Order of Merit
Norman John MacMillan	1909	1978	June 26, 1974	December 6, 1974	
Antonine Maillet	1929	2025	December 14, 1981	April 21, 1982	Officer of the National Order of Quebec; Member of the Order of New Brunswick
John C. Major	1931		April 10, 2008	December 12, 2008	
Nelson Mandela	1918	2013	September 3, 1998	September 24, 1998	Honorary appointment
John Manley	1950		June 30, 2025		Promotion within the Order
Ernest Manning	1908	1996	December 19, 1969	April 21, 1970	8th Premier of Alberta; Member of the Alberta Order of Excellence
Preston Manning	1942		May 3, 2007	December 12, 2008	Member of the Alberta Order of Excellence
Jean Marchand	1918	1988	June 23, 1986	November 12, 1986	
Léo Marion	1899	1979	July 6, 1967	November 24, 1967	Member of the Order of the British Empire
Lois Marshall	1924	1997	December 22, 1967	April 26, 1968	
Yann Martel	1963		December 29, 2021	November 17, 2022	
Claire Martin	1914	2014	May 30, 2001	October 17, 2001	Officer of the National Order of Quebec
Goldwyn Arthur Martin	1913	2001	April 17, 1997		
Paul Martin Sr.	1903	1992	January 14, 1976	April 7, 1976	
Paul Martin	1938		November 3, 2011	May 25, 2012	21st Prime Minister of Canada
Jean Martineau	1895	1985	December 19, 1969	April 21, 1970	
Ronald Martland	1909	1997	June 21, 1982	October 20, 1982	Member of the Alberta Order of Excellence
Vincent Massey	1887	1967	July 6, 1967	November 24, 1967	18th Governor General of Canada; Member of the Order of the Companions of Honour
Don Mazankowski	1935	2020	November 21, 2013	October 25, 2014	Member of the Alberta Order of Excellence
Harrison McCain	1927	2004	November 1, 1991	October 21, 1992	Member of the Order of New Brunswick
Margaret McCain	1934		November 21, 2013	November 21, 2014	27th Lieutenant Governor of New Brunswick
Wallace McCain	1930	2011	April 10, 2008	May 15, 2009	Member of the Order of New Brunswick
Jack McClelland	1922	2004	November 15, 2000	May 31, 2001	
Robert Baird McClure	1900	1991	June 25, 1971	October 29, 1971	
Arthur B. McDonald	1943		December 30, 2015	May 13, 2016	
Pauline Mills McGibbon	1910	2001	December 15, 1980	April 8, 1981	Member of the Order of Ontario
Gordon McGregor	1901	1971	December 20, 1968	April 8, 1969	Officer of the Order of the British Empire
William McIntyre	1918	2009	April 19, 1991	October 30, 1991	
Hector McKinnon	1890	1981	June 28, 1968	November 12, 1968	Companion of the Order of St Michael and St George
Beverley McLachlin	1943		June 29, 2018	May 8, 2019	17th Chief Justice of Canada
Norman McLaren	1914	1987	June 19, 1973	October 24, 1973	Knight of the National Order of Quebec
Samuel McLaughlin	1871	1972	July 6, 1967	September 18, 1968	
Marshall McLuhan	1911	1980	June 26, 1970	October 28, 1970	
John B. McNair	1889	1968	July 6, 1967	September 23, 1968	23rd Premier of New Brunswick; 22nd Lieutenant Governor of New Brunswick
Donald Malcolm McRae	1944		November 20, 2014	February 13, 2015	
John Meisel	1923	2025	April 15, 1999	September 23, 1999	
L. Jacques Ménard	1946	2020	December 31, 2012	November 22, 2013	Officer of the National Order of Quebec
Monique Mercure	1930	2020	October 27, 1993	April 13, 1994	Grand Officer of the National Order of Quebec
Lorne Michaels	1944		May 11, 2018		Promotion within the order Recipient of the Presidential Medal of Freedom
Norah Evangeline Michener	1901	1987	April 8, 1971	April 8, 1971	Spouse of the 20th Governor General of Canada
Roland Michener	1900	1991	July 1, 1967	July 5, 1967	20th Governor General of Canada; Member of the Order of Ontario
Albert Millaire	1935	2018	May 30, 2001	December 4, 2001	Knight of the National Order of Quebec
Frank Robert Miller	1908	1997	December 22, 1972	April 11, 1973	Commander of the Order of the British Empire
Brenda Milner	1918		May 13, 2004	December 10, 2004	Grand Officer of the National Order of Quebec
H. R. Milner	1889	1975	December 19, 1969	April 21, 1970	
Joni Mitchell	1943		May 1, 2002	October 30, 2004	
Michael Moldaver	1947		December 31, 2025		
Mavor Moore	1919	2006	July 11, 1988	November 8, 1988	Member of the Order of British Columbia
Moses Morgan	1917	1995	June 19, 1973	October 24, 1973	
Raymond Moriyama	1929	2023	April 10, 2008	November 5, 2009	Member of the Order of Ontario
Joe Morris	1913	1996	June 25, 1984	October 3, 1984	
Brian Mulroney	1939	2024	May 6, 1998	October 22, 1998	18th Prime Minister of Canada; Grand Officer of the National Order of Quebec
Robert Mundell	1932	2021	October 10, 2002	October 24, 2003	
Peter Munk	1927	2018	October 23, 2008	June 18, 2010	
Anne Murray	1945		December 17, 1984	April 10, 1985	Member of the Order of Nova Scotia
Donald Walter Gordon Murray	1894	1976	July 6, 1967	November 24, 1967	
Helen Mussallem	1915	2012	April 30, 1992	October 21, 1992	
James Fraser Mustard	1927	2011	October 27, 1993	February 16, 1994	Member of the Order of Ontario
Hilda Neatby	1904	1975	December 22, 1967	April 26, 1968	
Nathaniel Nemetz	1913	1997	April 20, 1989	October 18, 1989	Member of the Order of British Columbia
Peter C. Newman	1929	2023	April 20, 1990	October 24, 1990	
Yannick Nézet-Séguin	1975		June 29, 2012	September 12, 2014	
John Lang Nichol	1924	2020	May 9, 1996	October 22, 1997	
Cornelia Oberlander	1921	2021	December 29, 2017	May 10, 2018	Member of the Order of British Columbia
Alanis Obomsawin	1932		June 27, 2019	November 21, 2019	Grand Officer of the National Order of Quebec
Huguette Oligny	1922	2013	May 9, 1996	November 13, 1996	Officer of the National Order of Quebec
Betty Oliphant	1918	2004	December 23, 1985	April 9, 1986	Member of the Order of Ontario
Michael Ondaatje	1943		December 30, 2016	August 25, 2017	
Gordon Osbaldeston	1930	2019	April 17, 1997	October 22, 1997	
Bernard Ostry	1927	2006	November 17, 2005	April 5, 2006	
Sylvia Ostry	1927	2020	October 25, 1990	April 17, 1991	Member of the Order of Manitoba
Alphonse Ouimet	1908	1988	December 20, 1968	April 8, 1969	
Leonard Outerbridge	1888	1986	December 22, 1967	April 26, 1968	2nd Lieutenant Governor of Newfoundland; Commander of the Order of the British Empire
P. K. Page	1916	2010	October 21, 1998	February 3, 1999	Member of the Order of British Columbia
Jean Papineau-Couture	1916	2000	April 22, 1993	February 16, 1994	Grand Officer of the National Order of Quebec
Jean-Guy Paquet	1938		April 13, 1994	October 19, 1994	Grand Officer of the National Order of Quebec
Alphonse-Marie Parent	1906	1970	July 6, 1967	November 24, 1967	
John C. Parkin	1922	1988	June 23, 1972	October 25, 1972	
Julie Payette	1963		September 20, 2017	September 20, 2017	29th Governor General of Canada; Knight of the National Order of Quebec
George Pearkes	1888	1984	July 6, 1967	November 24, 1967	20th Lieutenant-Governor of British Columbia; Recipient of the Victoria Cross; Companion of the Order of the Bath
Lester B. Pearson	1897	1972	June 28, 1968	November 12, 1968	14th Prime Minister of Canada; Member of the Order of Merit; Officer of the Order of the British Empire
Jim Peebles	1935		November 27, 2020	May 3, 2024	Member of the Order of Manitoba
Alfred Pellan	1906	1988	July 6, 1967	November 24, 1967	Officer of the National Order of Quebec
Gérard Pelletier	1919	1997	December 18, 1978	October 24, 1979	
Wilfrid Pelletier	1896	1982	July 6, 1967	April 26, 1968	
Wilder Penfield	1891	1976	July 6, 1967	November 24, 1967	Member of the Order of Merit; Companion of the Order of St Michael and St George
Jean-Luc Pépin	1924	1995	July 11, 1977	October 26, 1977	
Oscar Peterson	1925	2007	June 25, 1984	April 10, 1985	Knight of the National Order of Quebec; Member of the Order of Ontario
Chantal Petitclerc	1969		May 25, 2009	September 3, 2010	Knight of the National Order of Quebec
Laurent Picard	1927	2012	June 23, 1976	October 20, 1976	
Jack Pickersgill	1905	1997	December 18, 1970	March 31, 1971	
Prince Philip, Duke of Edinburgh	1921	2021	April 26, 2013	April 26, 2013	Extraordinary Companion
Louis-Philippe Pigeon	1905	1986	June 23, 1980	October 15, 1980	Knight of the National Order of Quebec
Gordon Pinsent	1930	2023	October 21, 1998	April 14, 1999	
Gunther Plaut	1912	2012	October 21, 1999	February 9, 2000	Member of the Order of Ontario
Christopher Plummer	1929	2021	December 20, 1968	September 25, 1970	
John Polanyi	1929		June 25, 1979	October 24, 1979	Member of the Order of Ontario, Nobel Prize in Chemistry
Adrien Pouliot	1896	1980	June 23, 1972	October 25, 1972	
Dick Pound	1942		November 20, 2014	May 8, 2015	Member of the National Order of Quebec
Christopher Pratt	1935	2022	June 20, 1983	October 5, 1983	Member of the Order of Newfoundland and Labrador
Mary Pratt	1935	2018	November 14, 1996	April 16, 1997	
Juda Hirsch Quastel	1899	1987	June 26, 1970	October 28, 1970	
Louis Quilico	1925	2000	June 26, 1974	April 16, 1975	
Bob Rae	1948		May 7, 2015	February 12, 2016	Member of the Order of Ontario
Ivan Rand	1884	1969	April 11, 1968	April 26, 1968	
Louis Rasminsky	1908	1998	June 28, 1968	November 12, 1968	Commander of the Order of the British Empire
Hubert Reeves	1932	2023	October 30, 2003	February 27, 2007	Grand Officer of the National Order of Quebec
Louis-Marie Régis	1903	1988	December 17, 1971	April 12, 1972	
Escott Reid	1905	1999	December 17, 1971	April 12, 1972	
Maurice Richard	1921	2000	May 6, 1998	October 22, 1998	Officer of the National Order of Quebec
Kathleen M. Richardson	1927	2019	October 27, 1993	February 16, 1994	Member of the Order of Manitoba
Mordecai Richler	1931	2001	November 15, 2000	December 19, 2001	
Jean-Paul Riopelle	1923	2002	June 27, 1969	October 31, 1969	Grand Officer of the National Order of Quebec
Edgar Ritchie	1916	2002	June 25, 1975	October 15, 1975	
Charles Ritchie	1906	1995	June 27, 1969	October 28, 1969	
Roland Ritchie	1910	1988	June 24, 1985	October 30, 1985	
John Robarts	1917	1982	June 23, 1972	October 25, 1972	17th Premier of Ontario
Robert Gordon Robertson	1917	2013	January 14, 1976	April 7, 1976	
Rocke Robertson	1912	1998	December 19, 1969	April 21, 1970	
Norman Robertson	1904	1968	July 6, 1967	November 24, 1967	
Louis Robichaud	1925	2005	June 25, 1971	October 29, 1971	25th Premier of New Brunswick
John Josiah Robinette	1906	1996	June 19, 1973	October 24, 1973	Member of the Order of Ontario
Dufferin Roblin	1917	2010	June 26, 1970	October 28, 1970	14th Premier of Manitoba; Member of the Order of Manitoba
Guy Rocher	1924	2025	December 17, 1971	October 25, 1972	Knight of the National Order of Quebec
Chester Ronning	1894	1984	June 23, 1972	October 25, 1972	Member of the Alberta Order of Excellence
Ghislaine Roquet	1926	2016	June 26, 1970	October 28, 1970	
Janet Rossant	1950		May 7, 2015	May 13, 2016	
Marshall Rothstein	1940		May 11, 2017	January 24, 2018	
Alfred Rouleau	1915	1985	December 17, 1973	April 3, 1974	Grand Officer of the National Order of Quebec
Joseph Rouleau	1929	2019	May 6, 2010	November 17, 2010	Grand Officer of the National Order of Quebec
Roger Rousseau	1921	1986	December 15, 1976	April 20, 1977	
Jean-Louis Roux	1921	2013	December 21, 1987	May 10, 1988	Knight of the National Order of Quebec
Gabrielle Roy	1909	1983	July 6, 1967	November 24, 1967	
Maurice Roy	1905	1985	June 25, 1971	April 12, 1972	Officer of the Order of the British Empire
Peter Howard Russell	1932	2024	June 29, 2022	November 3, 2022	
Claude Ryan	1925	2004	May 4, 1995	November 16, 1995	Grand Officer of the National Order of Quebec
Moshe Safdie	1938		October 29, 2004	September 9, 2005	
Guy Saint-Pierre	1934	2022	October 10, 2002	October 24, 2003	Grand Officer of the National Order of Quebec
Robert B. Salter	1924	2010	April 17, 1997	October 22, 1997	Member of the Order of Ontario
John Ralston Saul	1947		September 28, 1999	September 28, 1999	Spouse of the 26th Governor General of Canada
Lucien Saulnier	1916	1989	December 17, 1971	April 27, 1973	
Jeanne Sauvé	1922	1993	May 14, 1984	May 14, 1984	23rd Governor General of Canada
Maurice Sauvé	1923	1992	May 14, 1984	May 14, 1984	Spouse of the 23rd Governor General of Canada
Donald Joseph Savoie	1947		June 29, 2022	October 20, 2022	
R. Murray Schafer	1933	2021	November 21, 2013	September 12, 2014	
Edward Schreyer	1935		January 22, 1979	January 22, 1979	22nd Governor General of Canada; Order of Manitoba
Lily Schreyer	1938		January 22, 1979	January 22, 1979	Spouse of the 22nd Governor General of Canada
Ted Scott	1919	2004	December 18, 1978	October 24, 1979	
F. R. Scott	1899	1985	July 6, 1967	November 24, 1967	
Charles Scriver	1930	2023	May 9, 1996	February 26, 1997	Grand Officer of the National Order of Quebec
Joseph Sedgwick	1898	1981	June 26, 1974	December 6, 1974	
Fernand Seguin	1922	1988	May 24, 1988	November 8, 1988	Officer of the National Order of Quebec
Hans Selye	1907	1982	December 20, 1968	April 8, 1969	
Mitchell Sharp	1911	2004	April 15, 1999	September 23, 1999	
Robert Fletcher Shaw	1910	2001	December 22, 1967	April 26, 1968	
Carol Shields	1935	2003	October 10, 2002	October 26, 2002	Member of the Order of Manitoba
Louis Siminovitch	1920	2021	November 17, 1988	April 12, 1989	Member of the Order of Ontario
Mary Simon	1947		July 22, 2021	July 22, 2021	30th Governor-General of Canada
Guy Simonds	1903	1974	December 18, 1970	October 29, 1971	Companion of the Order of the Bath; Commander of the Order of the British Empire
Léopold Simoneau	1916	2006	November 15, 1995	October 8, 1996	Knight of the National Order of Quebec
Murray Sinclair	1951	2024	December 29, 2021	May 26, 2022	
Joey Smallwood	1900	1991	December 1, 1986	December 11, 1986	1st Premier of Newfoundland
Michael Smith	1932	2000	October 19, 1994	May 3, 1995	Member of the Order of British Columbia
Michael Snow	1928	2023	October 25, 2007	May 15, 2009	
Omond Solandt	1909	1993	June 26, 1970	October 28, 1970	Officer of the Order of the British Empire
Harry Somers	1925	1999	December 17, 1971	April 12, 1972	
Margaret Southern	1931		October 25, 2007	May 15, 2009	Lieutenant of the Royal Victorian Order; Member of the Alberta Order of Excellence
Ron Southern	1930	2016	October 5, 2006	May 4, 2007	Commander of the Order of the British Empire; Member of the Alberta Order of Excellence
Wishart Spence	1904	1998	June 25, 1979	October 24, 1979	Officer of the Order of the British Empire
John Spinks	1908	1997	December 18, 1970	March 31, 1971	Member of the Order of the British Empire; Member of the Saskatchewan Order of Merit
Arnold Spohr	1923	2010	October 30, 2003	May 14, 2004	Member of the Order of Manitoba
Graham Spry	1900	1983	December 18, 1970	March 31, 1971	
Louis St. Laurent	1882	1973	July 6, 1967	November 24, 1967	12th Prime Minister of Canada
George F.G. Stanley	1907	2002	October 19, 1994	March 1, 1995	25th Lieutenant Governor of New Brunswick since Confederation
Robert Steadward	1946		December 30, 2020	November 17, 2022	Promotion within the Order; Member of the Alberta Order of Excellence
William Stephenson	1897	1989	December 17, 1979	February 5, 1980	
Ronald Daniel Stewart	1942	2024	December 28, 2023		Promotion within the Order; Member of the Order of Nova Scotia
Donna Strickland	1959		December 27, 2019	November 17, 2022	Awarded the Nobel Prize in Physics in 2018
Maurice Strong	1929	2015	October 21, 1999	April 26, 2000	Member of the Order of Manitoba
Donald Sutherland	1935	2024	June 27, 2019	November 21, 2019	
Janine Sutto	1921	2017	November 1, 1991	April 29, 1992	Knight of the National Order of Quebec
David Suzuki	1936		November 17, 2005	December 15, 2006	Member of the Order of British Columbia
Thomas Symons	1929	2021	April 17, 1997	February 4, 1998	Member of the Order of Ontario
Robert Taschereau	1896	1970	December 22, 1967	April 26, 1968	
Charles Taylor	1931		May 4, 1995	February 15, 1996	Grand Officer of the National Order of Quebec
Richard E. Taylor	1929	2018	June 29, 2005	February 17, 2006	
Paul Tellier	1939		October 21, 1992	April 21, 1993	
Veronica Tennant	1946		October 30, 2003	May 14, 2004	
Mark Tewksbury	1968		November 27, 2020	September 18, 2022	
Harry Thode	1910	1997	July 6, 1967	April 26, 1968	Member of the Order of the British Empire
Walter P. Thompson	1889	1970	July 6, 1967	October 22, 1968	
Shirley Thomson	1930	2010	May 30, 2001	December 4, 2001	Member of the Order of Ontario
Paul Thorlakson	1895	1989	December 18, 1970	March 31, 1971	
Graham Towers	1897	1975	June 27, 1969	October 28, 1969	
Pierre Trudeau	1919	2000	June 24, 1985	October 30, 1985	15th Prime Minister of Canada; Member of the Order of the Companions of Honour
Marcel Trudel	1917	2011	April 10, 2008	October 10, 2008	Grand Officer of the National Order of Quebec
John Turner	1929	2020	October 19, 1994	May 3, 1995	17th Prime Minister of Canada
D. Lorne Tyrrell	1943		December 31, 2025		Promotion within the Order; Member of the Alberta Order of Excellence
William Twaits	1910	1985	December 17, 1973	April 3, 1974	
Louis-Albert Vachon	1912	2006	December 19, 1969	April 21, 1970	Officer of the National Order of Quebec
Jean Vanier	1928	2019	December 29, 1986	June 4, 1989	Grand Officer of the National Order of Quebec
Pauline Vanier	1898	1991	July 6, 1967	November 24, 1967	
Murray Vaughan	1900	1986	June 27, 1969	October 28, 1969	
Jon Vickers	1926	2015	December 20, 1968	April 8, 1969	
Marcel Vincent	1907	1992	December 22, 1972	October 24, 1973	
Patrick Watson	1929	2022	October 18, 2001	October 26, 2002	
Ronald Lampman Watts	1929	2015	November 15, 2000	December 4, 2001	
L. Dana Wilgress	1892	1969	July 6, 1967	November 24, 1967	
Healey Willan	1880	1968	July 6, 1967	November 24, 1967	
Bertha Wilson	1923	2007	November 1, 1991	April 29, 1992	
John Tuzo Wilson	1908	1993	December 18, 1974	April 16, 1975	Officer of the Order of the British Empire
Lois Miriam Wilson	1927	2024	May 8, 2003	December 12, 2003	Member of the Order of Ontario
Michael Wilson	1937	2019	May 6, 2010	November 17, 2010	
Harold Wright	1908	1997	June 23, 1986	November 12, 1986	
Max Yalden	1930	2015	April 27, 2000	November 16, 2000	

== See also ==
- Canada: A People's History
- Heritage Minutes
- List of Canadian awards
- List of Canadian Victoria Cross recipients
- List of inductees of Canada's Walk of Fame
- Persons of National Historic Significance
- Removal from the Order of Canada
