= Margaret Norrie =

Canadian politician (1905–1983)

The Honourable Margaret Norrie
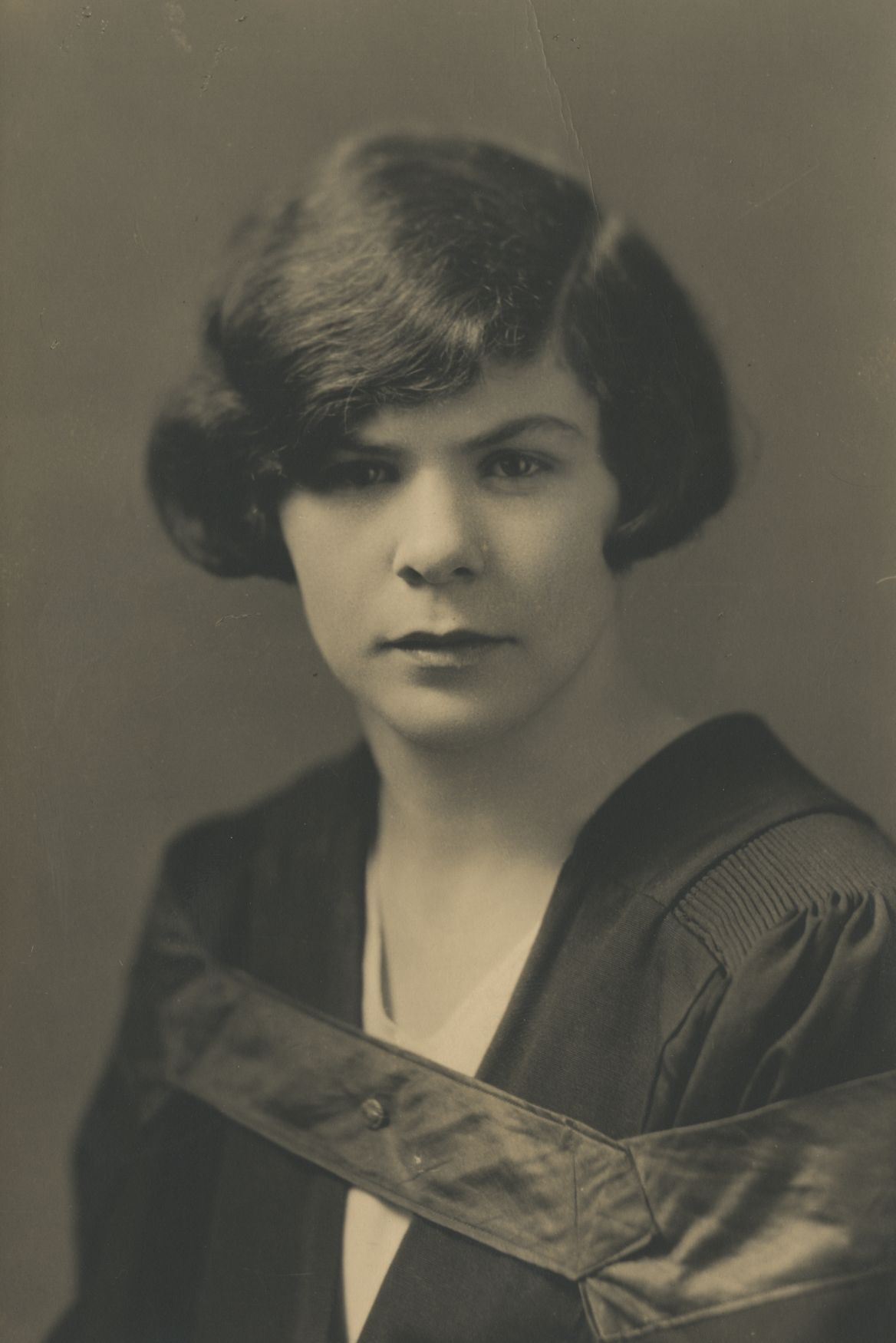

Member of the Senate of Canada for Colchester-Cumberland, Nova Scotia division
- In office 27 April 1972 – 16 October 1980

Personal details
- Born: Margaret Rosamond Fawcett; 16 October 1905 Upper Sackville, New Brunswick
- Died: 23 August 1983 (aged 77) Onslow, Nova Scotia
- Party: Liberal
- Spouse: James Paul Norrie
- Children: 4, including Margaret McCain
- Profession: Farmer, assistant professor

Margaret Rosamond Fawcett Norrie (16 October 1905 – 23 August 1983) was a Liberal member of the Senate of Canada. She was the first woman to be appointed senator from Nova Scotia when she was appointed in 1972 by Pierre Trudeau.

== Biography ==
Margaret Rosamond Fawcett was born in Upper Sackville, New Brunswick, the daughter of daughter of Bliss Fawcett and his second wife Laura Fullerton. At the age of seven, after the death of her father, she was primarily raised by Agnes (Fawcett) and George Trueman, her aunt and uncle.

During her childhood she attended Stanstead College, where her uncle was headmaster, for four years; however, she returned to her mother in Upper Sackville and graduated from Sackville High School in 1924. As her uncle had been appointed president of Mount Allison University the year before, she enrolled there and graduated in 1928 with a Bachelor of Arts in honors biology and a certificate in education. After graduation, she was hired to teach biology as an assistant professor and was appointed assistant dean of women in 1932-1933.

In 1933, she married widower James Paul Norrie, a mining engineer who was also a Mount Allison alumnus, and with him had two sons and two daughters. Her husband's death at age 53 left her a single mother. Norrie relocated to Onslow, Nova Scotia and bought the old Norrie homestead, where she was assisted for three years by her brother Carman.

== Political career ==
Norrie was a supporter of the Liberal Party of Canada. In 1956, she became the first woman in Nova Scotia to stand for election for any party; she made an unsuccessful challenge to Robert Stanfield. In 1964, she was appointed to the National Capital Commission. In 1968, she supported Allan MacEachen against Pierre Trudeau during the Liberal Party's leadership convention.

On 27 April 1972, Norrie was appointed Nova Scotia's first female senator. She served until retiring on 16 October 1980, upon which she returned to her farm. In 1981, she was awarded an honorary Doctorate of Laws from Mount Allison University. She died at her home on 23 August 1983.

== Legacy ==
In 2012, the Creamery Square Heritage Centre in Tatamagouche was renamed in honor of Margaret Norrie.

Norrie was the mother of Margaret McCain, who in 1994 became the first woman appointed Lieutenant Governor of New Brunswick.
