= Geoff Beattie =

Canadian business executive (born 1960)

Non-Executive Chairman of Maple Leaf Foods
- In office 2 May 2019 – 4 May 2022
- Preceded by: Hon. David Emerson
- Succeeded by: Michael McCain

Independent director of Baker Hughes
- Incumbent
- Assumed office 2017

Deputy Chairman of The Woodbridge Company
- In office 2000 – May 2013

Director of The Woodbridge Company
- In office 1998 – May 2013

President of The Woodbridge Company
- In office 1998 – December 2012

Chairman of CTVglobemedia
- In office 2007 – 1 April 2011

Personal details
- Born: William Geoffrey Beattie; 1960 (age 65–66) London, Ontario, Canada
- Spouse: Amanda Lang
- Education: University of Western Ontario
- Occupation: Business executive; lawyer

William Geoffrey Beattie (born 1960) is a Canadian business executive and former lawyer. He received his law degree from the University of Western Ontario in 1984 and was a partner in the Toronto law firm Torys LLP before joining The Woodbridge Company, where he was president from 1998 through December 2012.

The Woodbridge Company Limited is a privately held investment holding company for the Thomson family of Canada and the majority shareholder of Thomson Reuters, where Beattie was deputy chairman from 2000 through May 2013 and director from 1998 through May 2013. He has been chief executive officer of Generation Capital since September 2013, and chairman of Relay Ventures since June 2013. He is a member of the board of directors of Royal Bank of Canada (and chairman of the risk committee) and Maple Leaf Foods Inc. Beattie is a trustee of the University Health Network in Toronto.

He was the chairman of CTVglobemedia from 2007 to 2011 and the chairman of Maple Leaf Foods from 2019 to 2022.
