= Roger Blais =

Roger Blais may refer to:

- Roger Blais (geological engineer) (1926–2009), Canadian geological engineer and academic
- Roger Blais (filmmaker) (1917–2012), Canadian film director and producer
