= Jean E. Irving =

Canadian heiress and philanthropist (1926–2019)

Jean E. Irving ONB

Co-Chair of the Beaverbrook Art Gallery
- In office c. 2011 – 2019
- Preceded by: None
- Succeeded by: None

Personal details
- Born: Jean Elizabeth Saunders; 20 April 1926 Detroit, Michigan
- Died: 29 October 2019 (aged 93) Rothesay, New Brunswick
- Spouse: James K. Irving (m. 1951)
- Education: Registered Nurse

Jean E. Irving ONB (20 April 1926 – 29 October 2019) was a Canadian heiress and philanthropist. She was married to James K. Irving, a member of the prominent Irving family of New Brunswick, and was well known in the province for her philanthropic work. She was awarded the Order of New Brunswick in 2013. She had an estimated net worth of 900 million dollars (1.09 billion in 2022 inflation) and donated most of her wealth by the time she died. She amassed a collection of modern art, which was donated to the Beaverbrook Art Gallery upon her death..

Her and her husband had four children, Jim Jr., Robert, Mary Jean and Judith.
