= Samuel O. Freedman =

Canadian clinical immunologist (1928–2026)

- Born: May 8, 1928
- Died: November 10, 2026 (aged 98)
- Occupations: Immunologist, academic

Samuel Orkin Freedman, OC CQ FRSC (May 8, 1928 – November 10, 2026) was a Canadian clinical immunologist, academic and academic administrator. In 1965, he co-discovered with Phil Gold the carcinoembryonic antigen, the basis of a blood test used in the diagnosis and management of people with colorectal cancer.

== Background ==
Born in Montreal, Freedman received a Bachelor of Science in 1948 and a Doctor of Medicine in 1953 from McGill University.

Freedman died on November 10, 2026, at the age of 98.

== Career ==
From 1977 to 1981, he was the Dean of the McGill University Faculty of Medicine. From 1981 to 1991, he served as McGill's chief academic officer with the title of Vice-Principal, Academic (equivalent to Provost at U.S. universities). Freedman received an honorary degree from McGill in 1992. He was named Professor Emeritus in 2000. Until January 1, 2008, Freedman was senior advisor to the Sir Mortimer B. Davis Jewish General Hospital in Montreal, where he was previously research director.

== Book ==
- Freedman, Samuel O.; Gold, Phil (1976). Clinical Immunology. Hagerstown, Md.: Harper & Row. ISBN 0-06-140834-4 OCLC 2189449; 1st edition. Harper & Row. 1971. ISBN 0-06-140831-X.

== Research publications ==
- Gold, Phil; Freedman, Samuel O. (1965-03-01). "Demonstration of Tumor-Specific Antigens in Human Colonic Carcinomata by Immunological Tolerance and Absorption Techniques". Journal of Experimental Medicine. Rockefeller University Press. 121 (3): 439–462. doi:10.1084/jem.121.3.439 ISSN 1540-9538.

== Honours ==
- In 1976, he was made a Fellow of the Royal Society of Canada.
- In 1978, he was awarded the Gairdner Foundation International Award.
- In 1985, he was made an Officer of the Order of Canada.
- In 1998, he was awarded the Quebec government's Prix Armand-Frappier.
- In 2002, he was awarded Queen Elizabeth II's Golden Jubilee Medal
- In 2004, he was made a Knight of the National Order of Quebec.
- In 2012, he was awarded Queen Elizabeth II’s Diamond Jubilee Medal

Academic offices
Preceded by R. F. Patrick Cronin	Dean of the McGill University Faculty of Medicine; 1977–1981	Succeeded by Richard Cruess
