= Robert Bandeen =

Canadian businessman

Robert Angus Bandeen
- Born: October 29, 1930; Rodney, Ontario, Canada
- Died: August 16, 2010 (aged 79); Toronto, Ontario, Canada
- Education: University of Western Ontario; Duke University
- Known for: former President and Chief Executive Officer of Canadian National Railways
- Awards: Order of Canada

Robert Angus Bandeen OC (October 29, 1930 – August 16, 2010) was a Canadian businessman and former President and Chief Executive Officer of Canadian National Railways.

Born in Rodney, Ontario, on October 29, 1930, the third of four children of John Robert Bandeen and Jessie Marie Thomson. Bandeen's father was a tobacco buyer and farmer while his mother was an elementary schoolteacher. Raised on the family farm in Duart, Ontario, Bandeen and his siblings worked tobacco harvests throughout their school years.

The Bandeen children excelled at school and Robert earned a scholarship to the University of Western Ontario where he received a Bachelor of Arts degree in economics and political science, graduating in 1952 with the Governor General's Academic Medal. He was accepted directly into the Ph.D. program in economics at Duke University from which he graduated in 1955. He was hired as an economist at the Montreal headquarters of the Canadian National Railways in 1955. Bandeen met Mona Blair in Montreal in 1957 and they were married in spring 1958; they had four sons.

Bandeen became vice-president Great Lakes Region for CN in 1971 and he relocated to Toronto. This position also saw Bandeen in charge of CN's major U.S. holdings, the Grand Trunk Western Railroad, the Duluth, Winnipeg and Pacific Railway and the Central Vermont Railway. One of his first major decisions as vice-president Great Lakes Region was to consolidate the U.S. lines under a newly created holding company named Grand Trunk Corporation.

In 1974, Bandeen returned to Montreal where he was appointed president of CN, replacing the retiring Norman J. MacMillan. As president, Bandeen moved to reorganize CN into distinct profit centres focused on the core freight rail business. Bandeen moved to sell non-core businesses such as CN Hotels and trucking subsidiaries. He also moved to organize operations requiring government subsidies into separate entities, including CN Marine, Via Rail, and Terra Transport. Under Bandeen's leadership, CN refused to build new freight cars for grain shipments in Western Canada, citing the economics of the Crow Rate. A subsequent government inquiry determined that the Crow Rate was in fact costing CN and CP millions and a new law was passed by the Parliament of Canada in 1983 that allowed grain transportation rates to increase while railway losses would be covered by a federal government subsidy; the federal government also committed to building a new fleet of grain hopper cars. Bandeen retired as President and Chief Executive Officer of CN in 1982.

Following his career at CN, Bandeen worked for Crown Life where he was instrumental in reorganizing the company by reducing management, increasing profits, and improving brand awareness while taking on new business divisions. He left Crown Life in 1985 after working there for three years.

In 1981, he was appointed the 15th Chancellor of Bishop's University and served until 1987.

In 1980, he was made an Officer of the Order of Canada "in recognition of his contribution to the development of transportation in Canada".

He had four boys who have all gone on to be successful in the financial world. In retirement, Bandeen was living between Toronto and his farm in Quebec. A strong supporter of various community organizations and the arts, the Bandeens were members of various organizations, including the Montreal and Toronto symphony orchestras, the Art Gallery of Ontario, the Stratford Shakespeare Festival, and the Canadian Olympic Foundation.

In 2008, Robert Angus Bandeen was inducted into the North America Railway Hall of Fame for his contributions to the railway.

Bandeen died in Toronto, Ontario on August 16, 2010, following complications resulting from heart surgery.

== Bibliography ==
- Lumley, Elizabeth, ed. (1997). Canadian Who's Who 1997. Canadian Who's Who. Vol. XXXII. University of Toronto Press. ISBN 0-8020-4996-6.

Business positions
Preceded by Norman J. MacMillan	President of Canadian National Railway; 1974–1982	Succeeded by Maurice LeClair
Academic offices
Preceded by W. Mitchell	Chancellor of Bishop's University; 1981–1987	Succeeded by William I.M. Turner
