= Squirrel (peanut butter) =

Canadian brand of peanut butter

Squirrel was a Canadian brand of peanut butter, marketed from about 1915 to about 2000.

== History ==
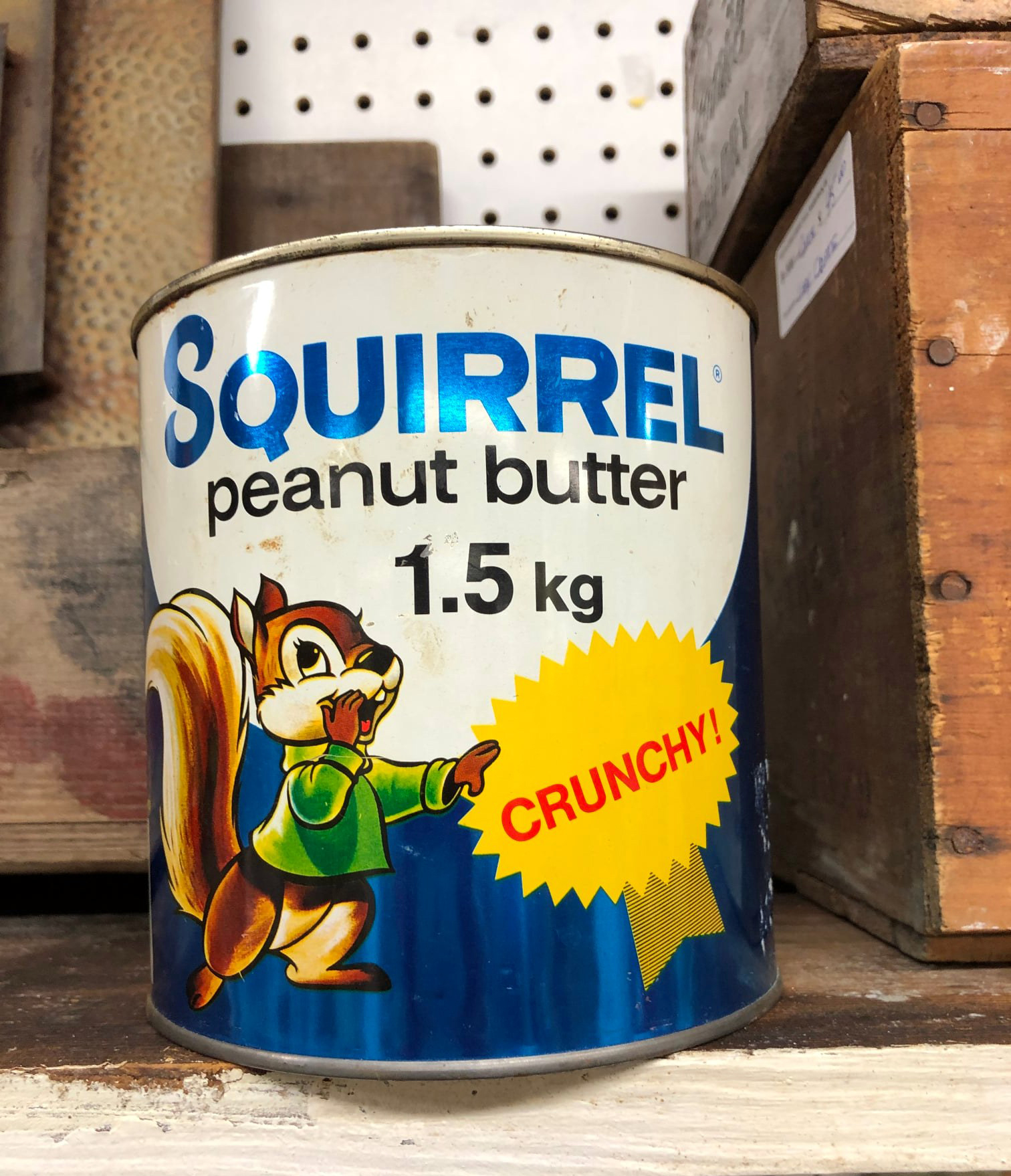
1.5 kg Squirrel Peanut Butter tin

Squirrel was originally manufactured by the Canada Nut Co. Ltd. of Vancouver, B.C., in 1915. For its initial 25 years or more it was marketed through Western Canada. Canada Nut Co created a subsidiary for their peanut products around 1931, called Squirrel Brand Products. The company was acquired by Vancouver food wholesaler Kelly, Douglas & Co in 1944, who continued to market Squirrel under the former Canada Nut Co moniker. In 1958 a second production plant was opened in the Toronto area (Ajax). By 1959 it was marketed across Canada through the Nabob Foods Limited division of Kelly, Douglas & Co. Ltd., then of Burnaby, B.C., which in turn was controlled by George Weston Limited and Loblaw Companies.

In May, 1975, George Weston Ltd. sold the 81-per-cent interest it held in Kelly, Douglas to Loblaws. In 1976 Nabob Foods Ltd. became a wholly owned subsidiary of Jacobs Suchard AG of Switzerland. In June, 1981, Nabob Foods Ltd. sold the Squirrel brand to Canada Packers Inc., to focus on its coffee business.

In December, 1990, Canada Packers sold the peanut butter business to a subsidiary of CPC International of Englewood Cliffs, N.J. CPC decided it would continue making Squirrel peanut butter, along with Skippy peanut butter, at a Montreal plant, owned by Best Foods Canada Inc., a subsidiary of CPC's Toronto-based subsidiary, Canada Starch Inc. In 1997 CPC International split into Bestfoods Corp. and Corn Products International, Inc.

Unilever PLC (ULVR) London took over Bestfoods Corp. in June, 2000, for $20.3-billion (U.S.), acquiring the Squirrel brand in Canada. It discontinued the Squirrel brand, marketing only the Skippy brand after its acquisition, despite Squirrel's longer history in Canada.

Unilever temporarily renamed Skippy in Canada as "Skippy the Squirrel", featuring a redrawn squirrel on the label (Skippy had previously used a stylized peanut as its mascot). The Skippy brand was withdrawn from the Canadian market in 2017.

== Characteristics ==
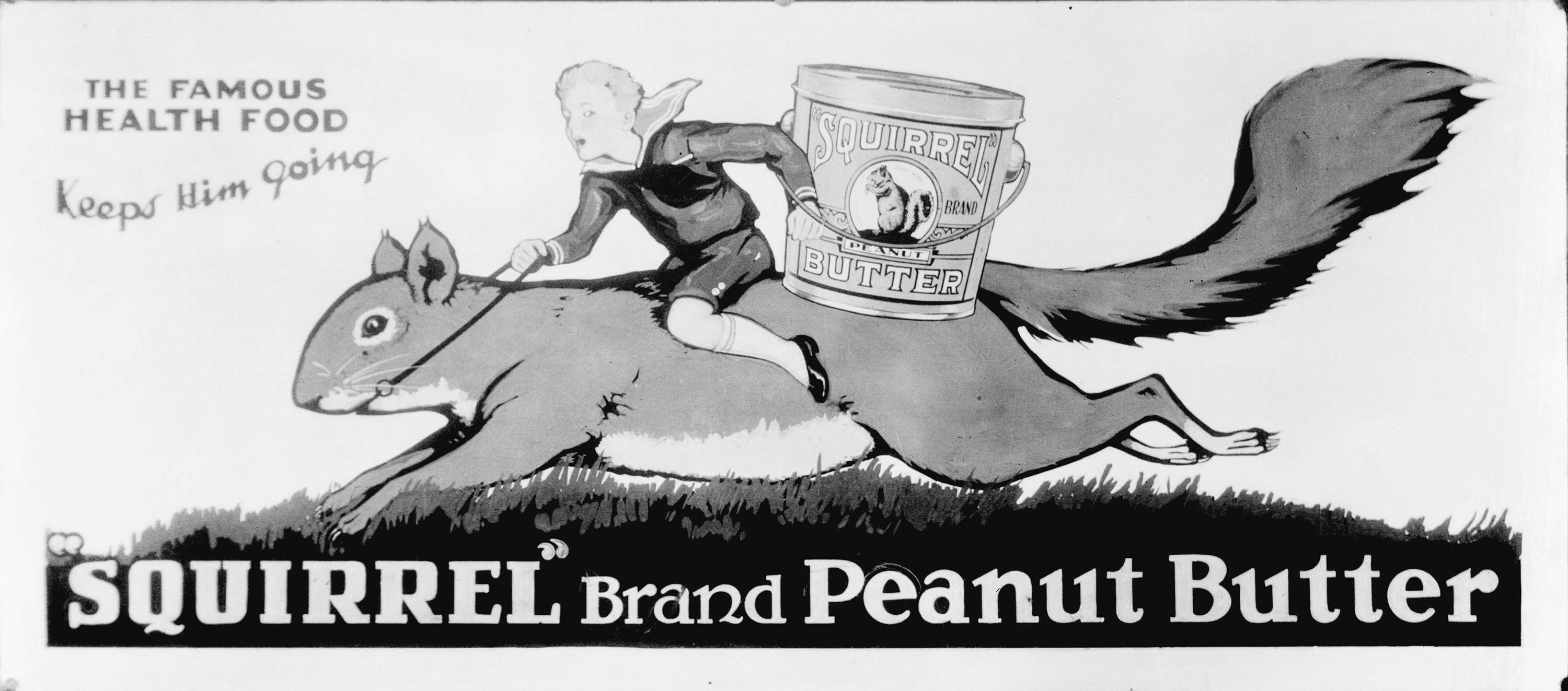
1927 ad for the product.

Squirrel was known for containing one whole peanut which lay on the top of the peanut butter when the jar was first opened, hence the slogan "The One With The Peanut On Top!" The peanut on top was eliminated when rebranded as Skippy. The brand was also known for "peanut points," which could be collected and redeemed for prizes. The mascot was a brown squirrel wearing a green sweater, smiling and sometimes holding a peanut. The slogan The One With the Peanut on Top was actually originally from York Peanut Butter and was transferred to Squirrel with Canada Packers purchase of the brand.

== Marketing ==
During the early 1960s Nabob used Joe Kapp, while he played for the BC Lions football team, to market Squirrel throughout British Columbia, helping him acquire the nickname "Peanut butter Joe".
