= Michael McCain =

Executive chairman of Maple Leaf Foods

Executive Chairman of Maple Leaf Foods
- Incumbent
- Assumed office May 4, 2022
- Preceded by: Geoff Beattie

President and CEO of Maple Leaf Foods
- In office January 1, 1999 – May 11, 2023
- Preceded by: A. Roger Perretti
- Succeeded by: Curtis Frank

President and COO of Maple Leaf Foods
- In office April 1995 – December 31, 1998
- Succeeded by: Richard Lan

Personal details
- Born: Michael Harrison McCain; November 13, 1958 (age 68) Florenceville-Bristol, New Brunswick, Canada
- Spouse: Christine McCain (m. 1981; div. 2013)
- Children: 5
- Parents: Wallace McCain (father); Margaret McCain (mother)
- Relatives: Harrison McCain (uncle)
- Education: Mount Allison University; Ivey Business School (HBA)
- Occupation: Business executive; philanthropist
- Salary: CA$1.08 million (2018)

Michael Harrison McCain (born November 13, 1958) is a Canadian business executive who serves as the executive chairman of Maple Leaf Foods. McCain formerly served as the president and chief executive officer from 1999 until 2023, and as chief operating officer of the company until the end of 1998. He is one of the wealthiest people in Canada and is currently listed on Canadian Business Magazine’s 100 richest Canadians.

== Early life and education ==
Michael Harrison McCain was born in Florenceville-Bristol, New Brunswick, on November 13, 1958. He is the son of Wallace McCain, the co-founder of McCain Foods and Margaret McCain, a Canadian philanthropist.

McCain attended Mount Allison University and then Ivey School of Business at the University of Western Ontario. He graduated in 1979 with a Bachelor of Arts in business administration. In 2014, McCain received an honorary doctorate from Carleton University in recognition of his leadership in economic development.

== Personal life ==
McCain was married to Christine McCain in 1981 and a divorce was filed on January 13, 2013. The court decree nullified a contract imposed on Christine at the time of marriage by Wallace McCain, his father, that waived her right to spousal support.

== Business work ==
=== McCain companies ===
In 1979, he joined McCain Foods sales department and worked up into management. By 1986, he became the president of McCain Citrus Incorporated and in 1990, was appointed as the president and chief executive officer of McCain Foods USA Incorporated. In the 1990s, a prolonged legal dispute between McCain co-founders and brothers Wallace and Harrison McCain over succession to the company leadership ended with the departure of Wallace and Michael from McCain Foods.

=== Maple Leaf Foods ===
McCain joined Maple Leaf Foods as president and chief operating officer in April 1995, and is currently the Executive Chairman of Maple Leaf Foods. McCain is also the director of Maple Leaf Foods, McCain Capital Corporation and McCain Foods Group Inc. McCain is also a member of the board of the Royal Bank of Canada, the American Meat Institute, and also serves on the board of trustees of the Hospital for Sick Children. He was also director of the American Frozen Food Institute and Bombardier Inc.

[T]here are two advisers I’ve paid no attention to. The first are the lawyers, and the second are the accountants.

— McCain, after apologizing in a press call

As CEO of Maple Leaf Foods, McCain's handling of the 2008 listeria outbreak was met with overall praise. The Globe and Mail has referred to McCain as "a role model for crisis management" for his contributions toward ameliorating the incident. Writing in The Conversation, Deborah de Lange complimented McCain's transparency, ethics, and communication skills during the outbreak, referring to his "track record of leadership", and Hill+Knowlton Strategies's Jane Shapiro referred to it as "a textbook case of how to handle a crisis". McCain was named the Business Newsmaker of 2008 by the Canadian press. Writing a 2013 case study in the Financial Times, business theorist Morgen Witzel noted that in addition to accepting responsibility, McCain's recovery strategy included a hiring freeze but open hiring in the food safety department, which was to hire at any cost.

In January 2020, McCain criticized "a narcissist in Washington" regarding the events that preceded Ukraine International Airlines Flight 752 being shot down by Iran, from the company Twitter account. McCain, a well-known philanthropist, was lauded by some, for his humanity, and criticized by others, for supplanting shareholder primacy, as reactive calls for a boycott of the company impacted stock prices.

In May 2022, McCain announced that he was appointed as the executive chairman of Maple Leaf Foods and will hand over CEO responsibilities to Curtis Frank by the 2023 annual meeting. On May 11, 2023, Curtis Frank was appointed as CEO.

== Sources ==
- Maple Leaf Foods biography
