= Wartime Prices and Trade Board =

The Wartime Prices and Trade Board is a former Canadian government agency, established on September 3, 1939, by the Mackenzie King government, under the authority of the War Measures Act, in the Department of Labour responsible for price controls and inflation control.

== Creation ==
The Board was established to avoid problems which happened during World War I. A chairman, Donald Gordon, was appointed in November 1941 and became a highly public figure at the time. He headed the agency, until April 1947. It was organized into 13 regional offices, 100 local offices. This allowed inflation to rise by only 2.8% between 1941 and 1945, after rising by 17.8% in the previous two years -- the most successful reduction amongst all nations during the war. On August 13, 1941, the Board moved from the Labour Department to the Department of Finance, according to Finance Minister James Ilsley, so that "Finance would be held responsible for inflation".

The scope of the Board's mandate was very broad, covering:

- the investigation of costs, prices and profits,
- the licensing of persons who dealt in any way with the necessities of life,
- the fixing of maximum prices and markups,
- regulation of the sale and distribution of the necessities of life,
- the buying and selling of goods, and taking into possession any stocks that were being withheld,
- recommending embargos on exports, and later on including import and export controls,
- the regulation of rentals and housing, and
- wage controls

In 1942, the Board was charged with reducing non-essential industrial activity to minimum requirements, in order to help concentrate employment in more essential sectors.

The board employed over 6,000 people (of which many of the public service administrators worked for only $1 a day), plus 16,000 women volunteers who were on Women's Regional Advisory Committees responsible for rationing, labeling, clothing conservation, housing shortages, and price checking. This latter initiative inspired the postwar creation of the Consumers' Association of Canada

== Extent of regulation ==
The Board's regulatory actions were compiled in a series of volumes during the wartime period:

WPTB Board Orders and Administrator's Orders, 1939–1945
Volume and period	Board Orders	Administrator's Orders
Volume 1 (1939–1942)	Nos. 1–223	Nos. A-1 to A-538
Volume 2 (January–June 1943)	Nos. 224–290	Nos. A-539 to A-794
Volume 3 (July–December 1943)	Nos. 291–355	Nos. A-795 to A-1055
Volume 4 (January–June 1944)	Nos. 356–413	Nos. A-1056 to A-1271
Volume 5 (July–December 1944)	Nos. 414–473	Nos. A-1272 to A-1500
Volume 6 (January–June 1945)	Nos. 474–528	Nos. A-1501 to A-1675
Volume 7 (July–December 1945)	Nos. 529–600	

== Impact ==
Though initially the popularity of the Board was high, gradually, it lost some popularity. Violations of regulations amounted to $1,780,000 in total fines and 253 incarcerations.

The board was abolished in 1951, upon the lapse of the Continuation of Transitional Measures Act, 1947.
