= Emil Skamene =

Canadian Immunologist (1941–2024)

- Born: 27 August 1941; Buchach, Poland
- Died: 3 October 2024 (aged 83); Hudson, Quebec, Canada
- Occupation: Immunologist
- Awards: National Order of Quebec

Emil Skamene, CQ FRSC (27 August 1941 – 3 October 2024) was a Canadian immunologist, medical researcher, and pioneer in genetic research.

== Early life ==
Skamene was born in Buczacz, Poland (now part of Ukraine). Many of his family members were killed in Nazi death camps, but he escaped and was adopted by a Czech family. He received his MD and PhD from Charles University in Prague before carrying out post-doctoral research at Harvard Medical School from 1968-1970 and later specialty training in allergy and immunology at McGill University from 1970-1974.

== Research career ==
Skamene was the Director of Research for the McGill University Health Centre, the Director of the Centre for the Study of Host Resistance, and a Professor in the Department of Medicine, the Department of Human Genetics, and the Institute of Parasitology.

In 2005, he was made a Knight (Chevalier) of the National Order of Quebec. In 2001, he was awarded the Prix Armand-Frappier. In 1997, he was made a Fellow of the Royal Society of Canada.

Skamene died in Hudson, Quebec on 3 October 2024, at the age of 83.
