= Margaret McCain =

27th lieutenant governor of New Brunswick

The Honourable Margaret McCain CC ONB
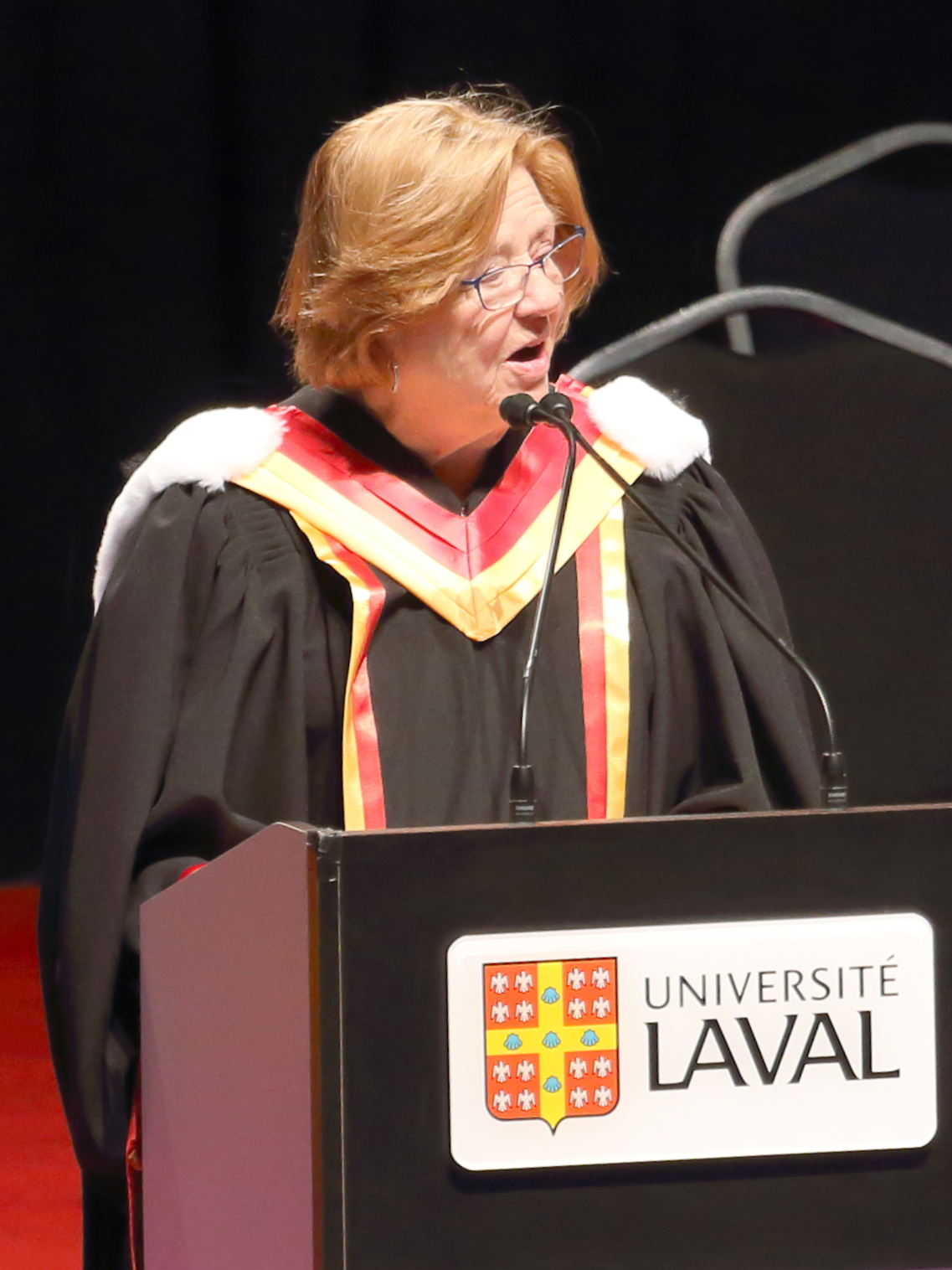
- McCain at Université Laval, 2019

27th Lieutenant Governor of New Brunswick
- In office June 21, 1994 – April 18, 1997
- Monarch: Elizabeth II
- Governors General: Ray Hnatyshyn; Roméo LeBlanc
- Premier: Frank McKenna
- Preceded by: Gilbert Finn
- Succeeded by: Marilyn Trenholme Counsell

Personal details
- Born: Margaret Norrie; October 1, 1934 (age 92) Amos, Quebec, Canada
- Spouse: Wallace McCain (m. 1955; died 2011)
- Children: 4, including Michael McCain
- Relatives: Margaret Norrie (mother); Harrison McCain (brother-in-law)
- Education: Mount Allison University (BA); University of Toronto (BSW)
- Profession: Philanthropist

Margaret Norrie McCain CC ONB (née Norrie; born October 1, 1934) is a Canadian philanthropist who was the first woman to serve as the lieutenant governor of New Brunswick.

She is known for her work in the promotion of early childhood education. As a member of the wealthy McCain family, she has donated millions of dollars to charitable causes.

== Early life and education ==
McCain was born Margaret Norrie in Amos, Quebec. She received a Bachelor of Arts degree from Mount Allison University and a Bachelor of Social Work from the University of Toronto.

== Career ==
McCain is the founding patron of the Muriel McQueen Fergusson Foundation for the elimination of family violence. From 1994 to 1997 she was the Lieutenant Governor of New Brunswick.

Following her term of office, McCain became co-chair with James Fraser Mustard of The Early Years Study into early childhood learning. The first report, Early years study : reversing the real brain drain, was commissioned by the Government of Ontario. Subsequent reports were published by other organizations. McCain continued to advocate for improvements in early childhood education.

In 2008, McCain and her husband Wallace opened the McCain Student Center at Mount Allison University. McCain served as the Chancellor of the university.

== Family ==
She was married to the late billionaire entrepreneur Wallace McCain, who co-founded McCain Foods. She has four children, nine grandchildren and eight great-grandchildren. Her mother, Margaret Norrie, was the first woman appointed to the Senate of Canada from Nova Scotia.

== Honours ==
- In 1994, she was invested as a Dame of Grace in the Most Venerable Order of Hospital of St. John of Jerusalem.
- In 1998, she was made an Officer of the Order of Canada and promoted to Companion in 2013.
- In 2003, she was made an Honorary Senior Fellow of Renison University College.
- In 2004, she became a member of the Order of New Brunswick.
- In 2005, she received the YWCA Toronto Women of Distinction Award.
- In 2006, she received the Philanthropist of the Year award from the Association of Fundraising Professionals for donating time and money to Canada's National Ballet School, The Learning Partnership and Canadian Women's Foundation.
- In 2007, St. Thomas University named its newest academic building in her honour. Margaret Norrie McCain Hall, housing a theatre, study lounge, administration offices and classrooms, opened in January 2007.
- In 2015, Mount Saint Vincent University opened the Margaret Norrie McCain Centre for Teaching, Learning and Research in her honour. The first building on a Canadian university campus dedicated to the accomplishments of women, the McCain Centre celebrates women’s contributions to business, public policy, family life, academia, the arts, sciences and community.
