= Robert Irving (industrialist) =

Canadian businessman and philanthropist (1954–2026)

Robert Irving ONB

President of the Moncton Wildcats
- In office May 28, 1996 – May 19, 2026
- Preceded by: John Graham

Co-CEO of J. D. Irving & President of Cavendish Farms
- In office 1992–2026
- Preceded by: K. C. Irving

Personal details
- Born: Robert Kenneth Irving; December 3, 1954 Saint John, New Brunswick, Canada
- Died: May 19, 2026 (aged 71) Moncton, New Brunswick, Canada
- Relations: Irving family
- Education: Acadia University

Robert Kenneth Irving ONB (December 3, 1954 – May 19, 2026) was a Canadian businessman and philanthropist, based in Moncton, New Brunswick. A member of the prominent Irving family, he was a grandson of Kenneth Colin Irving and son of James K. Irving and Jean E. Irving.

Robert was responsible for several businesses within the "Irving Group of Companies" with operations extending across North America.

== Life and career ==
Robert Irving was co-CEO of J.D. Irving Limited. He also served as the president of Irving Tissue, operated in coordination with its supplier, J.D. Irving Limited, which has the Majesta and Royale brands and Irving Personal Care.

Irving was president of Cavendish Farms, which has french fry and frozen food plants in North Dakota, Lethbridge, Alberta, Wheatley, Ontario and Prince Edward Island. He was co-chief executive officer of Midland Transport, and president of Midland Courier, both of which are shipping companies. He was president of the Moncton Wildcats, a QMJHL franchise.

Other businesses Robert Irving was responsible for include Cavendish Produce (which provides fresh produce for the retail and restaurant sector), Cavendish Agri (a supplier of agricultural fertilizers, chemicals and agricultural solutions) and Protrans (a supplier of contract services, labor and professional expertise). Both Irving and his brother, Jim, were co-CEOs of J.D. Irving Ltd., which is based out of Saint John, New Brunswick.

He was made a Member of the Order of New Brunswick (ONB) in 2024.

Irving died from cancer in Moncton, New Brunswick, on May 19, 2026, at the age of 71.
