= Prix Armand-Frappier =

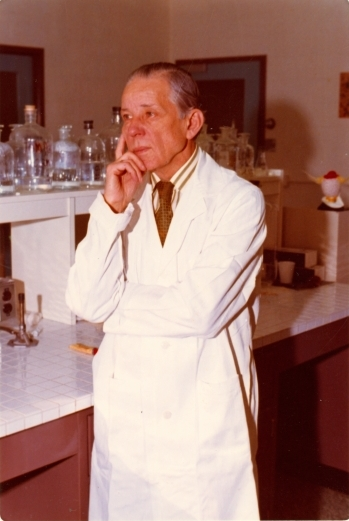
Armand Frappier, 1971

The Prix Armand-Frappier is an award by the Government of Quebec, part of the Prix du Québec, "given to people who have pursued a research career and have helped build up a research institution. Or it goes to those who have devoted themselves to administering or promoting research and have thereby helped train the next generation of scientists while raising public interest in science and technology". It is named in honour of Armand Frappier.

== Winners ==
- 1993 - Lionel Boulet
- 1994 - Maurice L'Abbé
- 1995 - Louis Berlinguet
- 1996 - Jacques Genest
- 1997 - Roger A. Blais
- 1998 - Samuel O. Freedman
- 2000 - Jean-Guy Paquet
- 2001 - Emil Skamene
- 2002 - Robert Lacroix
- 2003 - Charles E. Beaulieu
- 2004 - Camille Limoges
- 2005 - Francine Décary
- 2006 - Fernand Labrie
- 2007 - Yves Morin
- 2009 - Luc Vinet
- 2010 - Louis Fortier
- 2011 - Jean-Claude Tardif
- 2012 - Edwin Bourget
- 2013 - Michel L. Tremblay
- 2014 - Paul Lasko
- 2015 - Patrick Paultre
- 2016 - Denis Richard
- 2017 - Christophe Guy
- 2018 - Anne Bruneau
- 2019 - Réjean Hébert
- 2020 - Isabelle Peretz
- 2021 - Morag Park
- 2022 - Michel Chrétien
- 2023 - Maryse Lassonde
- 2024 - Sylvie Belleville
- 2025 - Yves Bergeron
