= Maple Leaf Foods =

Canadian food packaging company

Maple Leaf Foods Inc.
- Logo as of 2018
- Type: Public
- Traded as: TSX: MFI
- Industry: Food packaging
- Predecessors: Canada Packers Inc.; Maple Leaf Mills Limited
- Founded: 1991; 35 years ago
- Headquarters: 6897 Financial Drive, Mississauga, Ontario, Canada
- Area served: Canada; United States
- Key people: Michael McCain (Executive chairman); Curtis Frank (president and CEO); Adam Grogan (president and COO)
- Revenue: ▲CA$3.94 billion (2019)
- Net income: ▼CA$0.08 billion (2019)
- Total assets: ▲CA$3.51 billion (2019)
- Total equity: ▼CA$1.95 billion (2019)
- Number of employees: 24,000 (2008)
- Website: mapleleaf.ca

Maple Leaf Foods Inc. is a Canadian multinational consumer-packaged meats and food production company. Its head office is in Mississauga, Ontario.

== History ==
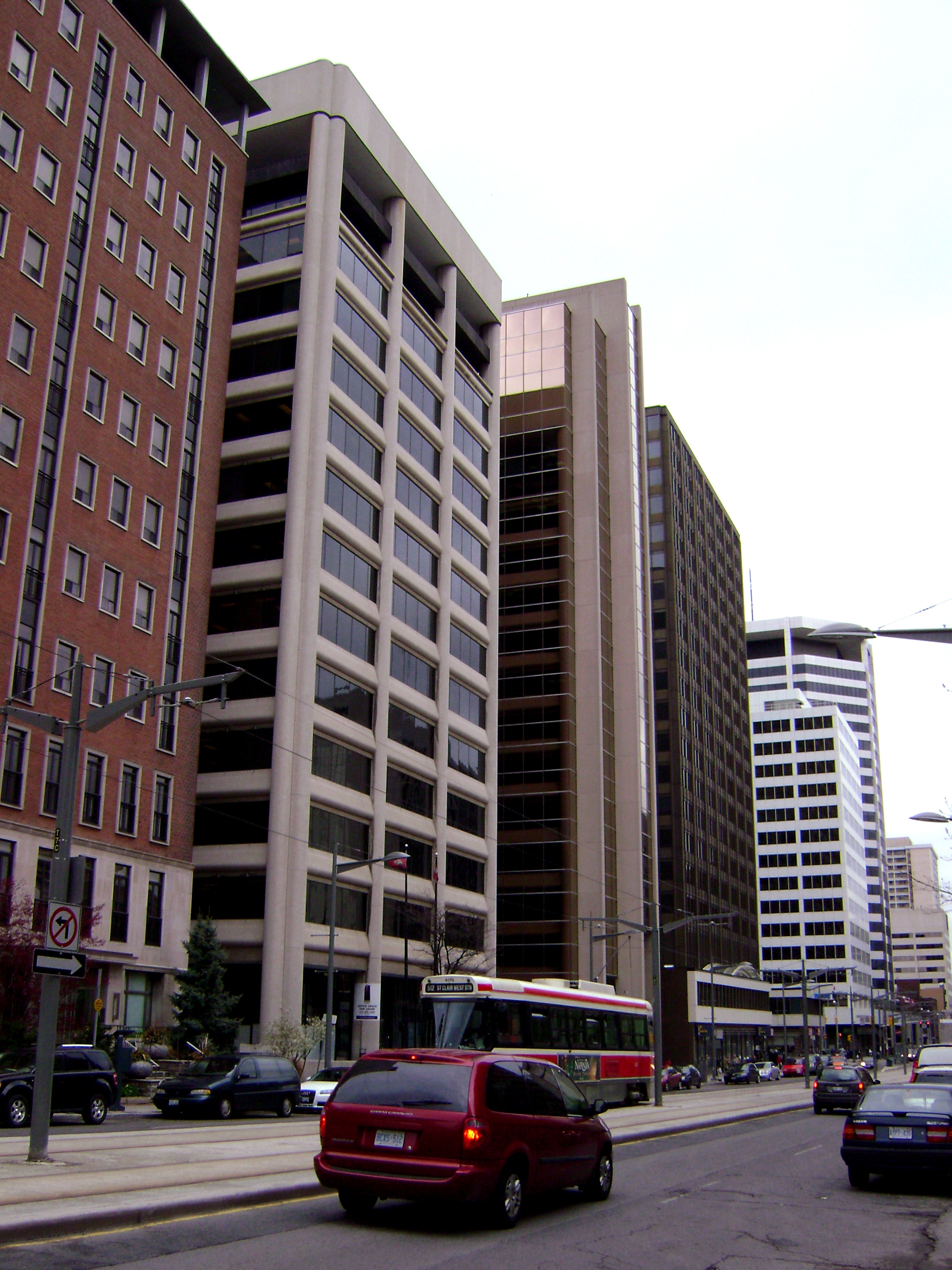
The former head office of Maple Leaf Foods was in the third building (middle)

Maple Leaf Foods is the result of the 1991 merger between Canada Packers and Maple Leaf Mills.

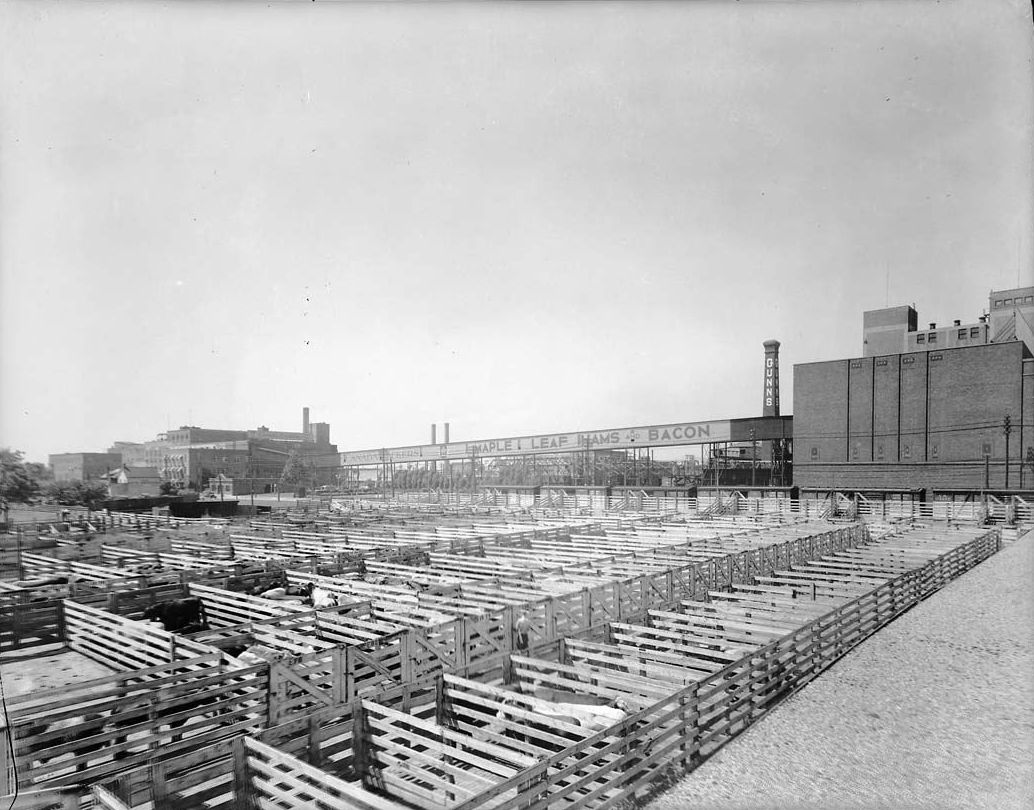
Canada Packers plant in Toronto, c. 1950

Canada Packers was founded in 1927 as a merger of several major Toronto meat packers, most prominently William Davies Company and was immediately Canada's largest food processor, a title it would hold for the next sixty years. Already in the 1930s, it used the brand name Maple Leaf along with Klik and Kam for its pork products, its main business, with its massive operations for processing hogs for exporting to the United Kingdom helped Toronto earn its nickname "Hogtown". Moving into western Canada it became Canada's largest beef slaughterer. In 1944, it also entered the tanning industry with the acquisition of Beardmore & Co.

Canada Packers diversified into other food products, including ice cream, cheese, and canned and frozen fruits and vegetables, by 1950 marketed under the York brand. In 1975, it was listed as the 14th-largest business in Canada.

During the 1980s, Canada Packers began to suffer. It closed some facilities, including its tannery. It moved into other markets, acquiring well-known brands such as Squirrel peanut butter and Black Diamond cheese.

Maple Leaf Mills was created in 1961 through the amalgamation of the Maple Leaf Milling Company Limited, Toronto Elevators Limited and Purity Flour Mills Limited. Its origins can be traced back over 170 years to Grantham Mills, built in 1836 in St. Catharines, Ontario.

In 1989, the McLean family that had dominated Canada Packers since its founding announced its intention to sell its stake in the company. The controlling interest passed in 1990 to the British Hillsdown Holdings, which already owned Maple Leaf Mills, through a complex transaction in which Canada Packers purchased Maple Leaf Mills in exchange for its own shares. In 1991, the combined company was renamed Maple Leaf Foods. The firm thus included a large bread division, best known for the Dempster's brand. During restructuring efforts led by David Newton as CEO and Lewis Rose as CFO, it sold or closed most of its slaughterhouses. These measures were successful and the company returned to profitability.

After being successfully revived, Maple Leaf Foods was purchased by Wallace McCain, formerly co-CEO of McCain Foods, who had been ousted by his brother and co-owner Harrison McCain, in 1995 along with the Ontario Teachers' Pension Plan. In 2002, the company purchased San Francisco-based Grace Baking Company. In 2003, the company purchased rival meat packer Schneider Foods (founded by John Metz Schneider in 1890 in Berlin, now Kitchener, Ontario). The company is also one of Canada's largest agribusinesses, owning poultry and hog farms across the country. The main slaughterhouse is located in Brandon, Manitoba.

As the result of a series of divestitures culminating with the 2014 sale of the bakery division (Canada Bread Company), Maple Leaf today now only produces and sells fresh and packaged meats, as well as plant-based protein products via its acquisition of Lightlife and Field Roast.

In late 2018, the company announced that the old plants in St. Marys, Brampton and Toronto, Ontario, Canada were scheduled to close in subsequent years but that a new poultry plant would be built in London. The cost of the 60,000 square meter facility was estimated at over $600 million partly funded by $34.5 million from the Ontario government and $28 million from the federal government. The closures were necessary because the relevant plants were "50 to 60 years old and severely growth constrained because of location, footprint or infrastructure and nearing the end of their productive capacity", according to then-CEO Michael McCain. As of November 2018, the company employed over 11,000 people across Canada and was selling its products in over 20 global markets.

In January 2020, CEO Michael McCain garnered media attention for criticizing "a narcissist in Washington" regarding events preceding Ukraine International Airlines Flight 752 being shot down by Iran, in a series of tweets from the company Twitter account. McCain, who has been noted by media as "a role model for crisis management", was lauded by some, for his "humanity", and criticized by others, for supplanting shareholder primacy, as reactive calls for a boycott of the company impacted stock prices.

In February 2021, the company admitted in a management report that it was target of an "ongoing investigation by the Competition Bureau into the Canadian bread industry, including alleged price fixing and related securities disclosure issues." The company also noted in the management report that "Unfavourable resolution of these or other legal matters could have a material adverse effect on the Company, its financial condition and its reputation". In 2021, the company was named, with former subsidiary Canada Bread and its current parent company, Grupo Bimbo, and others, as defendants in a class-action bread price fixing lawsuit.

In May 2022, Michael McCain announced that he would become executive chairman and hand over CEO responsibilities to Curtis Frank by the 2023 annual meeting. On May 11, 2023, Curtis Frank was appointed as CEO.

In October 2025, Maple Leaf completed the spinoff of its pork business, Canada Packers Inc.

=== Mitchell's Gourmet Foods ===
Saskatoon, Saskatchewan, is the headquarters of Mitchell's Gourmet Foods, formerly known as Intercontinental Packers, which produces the "Olympic Fine Meats" line of products and is one of Canada's largest meat processors, employing more than 1,400 Saskatonians.

Originally established in Saskatoon in 1940 by Fred Mendel as Intercontinental Packers, the business concentrated on canned meat products sold into the US and bacon for Britain during the war years. In 1998, the family-run business changed its name to Mitchell's Gourmet Foods.

In 1999, an alliance was formed with Schneider Corporation, and eventually the business was sold to Schneider on 12 November 2002. On 25 September 2003, Schneider was acquired by Maple Leaf Foods. Mitchell continues as an independent operating company of Schneider Foods. However, on 12 October 2006, Maple Leaf Foods, owners of Mitchell's, announced it would be closing down its major plant in Saskatoon over the next three years. A portion of the Circle Drive - 11th Street interchange now occupies part of the land.

On March 1, 2007, Maple Leaf Foods announced that it would cease operations of the cut/kill departments at their Saskatoon slaughterhouse. The last day of operation was June 1, 2009.

=== Meat alternatives ===
In April 2019, the company announced their intent to expand products that are alternatives to meat. The plan included the purchase of a 230,000-sq.-ft.processing plant in Shelbyville, Indiana. When completed in late 2020, this facility would become the largest of its kind in North America, according to the company. Maple Leaf was already marketing meatless products such as burgers and sausages under its LightLife brand, designed to closely resemble meat in appearance and flavour. Plant-based products were being manufactured at its Greenleaf Foods SPC plant-based division in Chicago, at a LightLife plant in Massachusetts and at Field Roast's in Seattle. The location of the new plant was logical because "more than 95 per cent of the LightLife and Field Roast business is in the United States today", according to the company. Maple Leaf announced, in January 2021, that it would instead purchase an existing plant in Indianapolis.

In 2026, Maple Leaf Foods announced that they would be re-launching the Yves Veggie Cuisine brand to Canadian consumers on July 1, 2026. This launch will include the reintroduction of like plant-based ground round and deli slices.

== Canadian Food Inspection Agency recall ==
In August 2008, shortly after a plant closure, Maple Leaf Foods announced a recall for several products which was later expanded to products from Maple Leaf, Schneiders, McDonald's, and other products.

While not immediately clear, the outbreak of Listeriosis would kill 22 people and ail a further 35 more.

According to the National Post, the recall took place on 24 August 2008 and included all cured meats manufactured from a contaminated Toronto plant. By 25 August, the outbreak had claimed as many as five lives and sickened dozens. The Canadian Food Inspection Agency issued a public warning against consuming several Maple Leaf products due to possible contamination with Listeria monocytogenes. CEO Michael McCain issued a statement of condolence to those affected by the outbreak.

The public health agency also said a further 30 suspected cases remain under investigation.

On August 27, 2008, The Globe and Mail reported a leaked Conservative cabinet document which outlined plans for the Canadian Food Inspection Agency to give the food industry a greater role in the inspection process. However, some of the plans had been in place since 31 March 2008 according to a CFIA manager and an official from the union that represents the federal inspectors.

At the Maple Leaf plant behind the Listeria outbreak, a single federal inspector was relegated to auditing company paperwork and had to deal with several other plants, the manager and the union official said, contradicting the impression that officials had left the week before that full-time watchdogs were on-site. Under the new system, federal inspectors do random product tests only three or four times a year at any given plant, and meat packers are required to test each type of product only once a month. Under the old system, inspectors had a more hands-on role on the plant floor, did more of the tests themselves and had more freedom to investigate, said former CFIA inspector.

Prime Minister Stephen Harper rejected any suggestions that the federal government was not doing enough. The Conservative government's changes were the subject of heated controversy as academics and the opposition express concerns over the few details that had emerged so far. The 2008 budget indicated the CFIA was asked to find savings to pay for new programs. The leaked document indicated savings would be found by transferring some meat-inspection duties to industry.

Since 2008, there have been:

- 38 confirmed cases of listeriosis across Canada (22 in Ontario, 4 in B.C., 2 in Quebec and 1 in Saskatchewan).
- 30 suspected cases (16 in Ontario, 10 in Quebec and 4 in Alberta)
- 9 confirmed deaths caused by the outbreak (all in Ontario)
- 11 suspected deaths (6 in Ontario, 2 in Alberta, 1 in B.C., 1 in Saskatchewan and 1 in Quebec)

== 2009 precautionary recall ==
On 4 August 2009, roughly one year after the 2008 recall of Maple Leaf Foods products due to listeriosis contamination, another recall was ordered on nine wiener products. Brands affected were Hygrade, Shopsy's and Maple Leaf at its plant in Hamilton, Ontario, due to the possibility that they may have contained traces of Listeria monocytogenes. No cases of listeriosis related to this recall were confirmed.

== United Kingdom ==
In 1996, Maple Leaf Bakery UK was established in Rotherham as a speciality bakery subsidiary of Canada Bread which in turn is 89.8% owned by Maple Leaf Foods. It operates from a total of six sites in the UK and employs around 1,200 employees. It owns the New York Bagel brand and currently makes over 90% of the 200 million bagels supplied to the UK retail and wholesale market.

In recent years, Maple Leaf has diversified from its traditional bagel market into new areas of specialty bakery business. In 2006, it acquired The French Croissant Company, Avance and the Harvestime Bakery. These three purchases were followed by the purchase of premium breads supplier La Fornaia in August 2007 and, three months later in November, Bernard Matthews bakery in Dunstable.

The company's key products now include bagels, ciabatta, croissants, artisan breads, baguettes, soft pretzels, bialys and tear'n'share breads.

In December 2008, after trying to take over north London based rival The Bagel Group, allegations were made by the owner of The Bagel Group via the tabloid Sunday Mirror newspaper to the Office of Fair Trading of price fixing, after Managing Director Peter Maycock was filmed in a Chinese restaurant.

== Grupo Bimbo ==
In February 2014, Canada Bread, in which Maple Leaf Foods previously had a 90% stake, was acquired by the multinational Grupo Bimbo for CA$$1.83 billion. The remaining Maple Leaf Foods is a protein-only company with approximately CAD$3 billion in revenue.

== See also ==
- Maple Leaf Mills Silos
- TREMERE: Arnold Tremere, M.Sc., Ph.D., Nutritionist and Director of Nutrition and Research Maple Leaf Mills Agriculture division, Toronto; General Manager of Maple Leaf Mills, Western Region, Calgary.
