= Richard Cruess =

Canadian Orthopaedic surgeon

Richard Leigh Cruess CC OQ
- Born: December 17, 1929 (age 95); London, Ontario
- Awards: Order of Canada, National Order of Quebec

Richard Leigh Cruess, CC OQ FRSC (born December 17, 1929) is a Canadian orthopaedic surgeon and academic.

Born in London, Ontario, he received his Bachelor of Arts degree from Princeton University in 1951 and his Doctor of Medicine degree from the Columbia University College of Physicians and Surgeons in 1955. From 1955 to 1962, he did his internship and residency at the Royal Victoria Hospital in Montreal and at the New York Orthopaedic Hospital of Columbia-Presbyterian Medical Center. From 1957 to 1959, he served with the Navy Medical Corps of U.S. Naval Reserve with a rank of Lieutenant.

From 1963 to 1968, he was the attending Orthopaedic Surgeon at the Royal Victoria Hospital and from 1968 to 1981 was the Orthopaedic Surgeon-in-Charge. From 1979 to 1981, he was the Assistant Surgeon-in-Chief. From 1970 to 1982, he was also the Surgeon-in-Chief at the Shriners Hospital for Children – Canada in Montreal.

From 1981 to 1995, he was the Dean of the McGill University Faculty of Medicine.

In 1994, he was made a Member of the Order of Canada; he was promoted to Officer in 1999 and to Companion in 2014. In 2003, he was made an Officer of the National Order of Quebec. In 1985, he was made a Fellow of the Royal Society of Canada. In 2004, he received an honorary degree from Université Laval.

He is married to Sylvia Cruess, an endocrinologist.

Academic offices
Preceded by Samuel O. Freedman	Dean of the McGill University Faculty of Medicine; 1981-1995	Succeeded by Abraham Fuks
