= Laurent Picard =

Canadian businessman

Laurent Picard CC
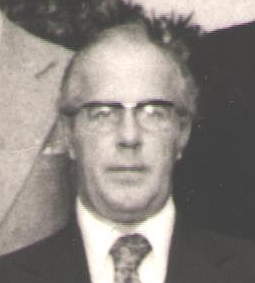
- Picard in 1974
- Born: October 27, 1927; Quebec City, Quebec, Canada
- Died: August 29, 2012 (aged 84); Montreal, Quebec, Canada
- Known for: President of the Canadian Broadcasting Corporation
- Awards: Order of Canada

Laurent A. Picard CC (27 October 1927 – 29 August 2012) was a French-Canadian businessman and former president of the Canadian Broadcasting Corporation.

Born in Quebec City, Quebec, he received a Bachelor of Arts degree as well as a Bachelor of Philosophy degree in 1947 from Université Laval. He then received a Bachelor of Arts and Sciences degree in physics in 1954, again from Université Laval, and a Doctor of Business Administration from Harvard University in 1964.

From 1955 to 1959, he was a professor at the Faculty of Commerce of Université Laval. From 1960 to 1962, he was a research associate and assistant at the Harvard Business School. From 1962 to 1968, he was a professor and associate director at HÉC, the École des Hautes Études Commerciales of the Université de Montréal. From 1968 to 1972, he was an executive vice-president of the Canadian Broadcasting Corporation, where he also then served as president from 1972 to 1975. Between 1975 and 1977 he was director of Telesat.

From 1978 to 1986, he was the dean of the Faculty of Management at McGill University.

He was a member of the board of directors at Dorel Industries.

He was made a Companion of the Order of Canada in 1976.

Government offices
Preceded by George Forrester Davidson	President of the Canadian Broadcasting Corporation; 1972–1975	Succeeded by Albert Wesley Johnson
