= George Forrester Davidson =

Canadian civil servant (1909–1995)

- Born: April 18, 1909; Bass River, Nova Scotia
- Died: July 22, 1995 (aged 86); Victoria, British Columbia
- Education: University of British Columbia; Harvard University
- Title: President of the Canadian Broadcasting Corporation
- Term: 1968–1972
- Predecessor: Alphonse Ouimet
- Successor: Laurent Picard
- Awards: Order of Canada

George Forrester Davidson, CC (April 18, 1909 – July 22, 1995) was a Canadian civil servant and president of the CBC.

Born in Bass River, Nova Scotia, he graduated from the University of British Columbia in 1928 and earned a Ph.D. in classical studies from Harvard University in 1932. He was appointed Superintendent of Welfare in British Columbia and became Director of Welfare in 1939. Despite his lack of training, Davidson learned on the job from B.C.'s first professional social worker, Laura Holland, and Dr. Harry Cassidy. He took over from Cassidy as B.C.'s Director of Welfare in 1939 and soon thereafter became director of the Canadian Welfare Council. He served as Deputy Minister for National Health and Welfare from 1944 to 1960, helping to administer the new Family Allowance program, then later worked in Citizenship and Immigration, as Secretary to the Treasury Board. He was president of the CBC from 1968 until 1972. In 1972 he held the most senior post ever by a Canadian in the United Nations when Kurt Waldheim appointed him Under-Secretary General for Administration and Management, a position which he held for seven years.

In 1972 he was made a Companion of the Order of Canada.

He died in Victoria, British Columbia in 1995.

Government offices
Preceded by Alphonse Ouimet	President of the Canadian Broadcasting Corporation; 1968–1972	Succeeded by Laurent Picard
