= Norman John MacMillan =

Norman John MacMillan CC, QC
- Born: 1909
- Died: 30 October 1978 (aged 68–69)
- Education: University of Manitoba
- Occupation: lawyer
- Title: President of Canadian National Railways
- Term: 1967–1974

Norman John MacMillan, CC, QC (1909 – 30 October 1978) was a president of Canadian National Railway.

MacMillan studied at the University of Manitoba where he graduated with a Bachelor of Arts in 1930. In 1934, he received a Bachelor of Laws.

As a career lawyer, MacMillan joined Canadian National Railways in 1937 as a solicitor in the company's Winnipeg, Manitoba, office. He moved to Canadian National's Montreal office in 1943, becoming the railway's general counsel in 1945. In 1967 he became the company's President, leading the railway through a time of technological change. Before his retirement in 1974, MacMillan would see the start of construction on Toronto's CN Tower landmark.

He died in 1978 at his cottage in his birthplace community of Bracebridge. He was married with a son and a daughter.

== Awards and recognition ==
- 1967: honorary Doctor of Laws from the University of Manitoba
- 1972: first-ever Canadian recipient of the Distinguished Service Award by American Railway Development Association
- 26 June 1974: appointed a Companion of the Order of Canada

== Legacy ==
- MacMillan Yard in Vaughan, Ontario was named for him.

Business positions
Preceded by Donald Gordon	President of Canadian National Railway; 1967 – 1974	Succeeded by Robert Bandeen
