= Wallace McCain =

Canadian businessman

Wallace McCain CC ONB
- Born: George Wallace Ferguson McCain; April 9, 1930; Florenceville-Bristol, New Brunswick, Canada
- Died: May 13, 2011 (aged 81); Toronto, Ontario, Canada
- Education: Mount Allison University (BA, 1951)
- Occupation: Businessman
- Known for: Co-founder, McCain Foods
- Spouse: Margaret McCain (m. 1955)
- Children: 4, including Michael McCain
- Relatives: Harrison McCain (brother)
- Family: McCain family
- Honours: Companion of the Order of Canada; Order of New Brunswick

George Wallace Ferguson McCain CC ONB (April 9, 1930 – May 13, 2011) was a Canadian businessman and co-founder of McCain Foods. With an estimated net worth of $US 4.15 billion (as of 2018), McCain was ranked by Forbes as the 13th wealthiest Canadian and 512th in the world.

== Early life ==
McCain was born in Florenceville-Bristol, New Brunswick, Canada, as the son of Andrew Davis McCain, a descendant of a settler from Castlefinn, Donegal, Ireland who became a well-respected seed potato farmer. Since 1900, the family sold seed potatoes throughout New Brunswick and exported to Cuba and Latin America.

== Education ==
McCain graduated from Mount Allison University in 1951 with a Bachelor of Arts degree. In 2007, he gave a record $873,000 to his alma mater. On February 21, 2011, he donated $5,000,000 to the University of New Brunswick, Saint John campus for the Wallace McCain Institute, a program for business students and entrepreneurs.

== Career ==
Wallace McCain co-founded McCain Foods in 1956 with his brother Harrison McCain, building it into one of the world's largest frozen food companies. In the 1990s a prolonged legal dispute between Harrison and Wallace over succession to the company leadership ended with the departure of Wallace's sons Michael and Scott McCain from McCain Foods. Father and son moved to Maple Leaf Foods.

Wallace and Harrison were estranged after the fallout from their McCain Foods dispute. In 2004 there was rapprochement between the brothers when Wallace visited Harrison who was sick in the hospital. Wallace has also been a confidante to McCain Foods' non-family executives who now run the firm.

After being ousted from McCain Foods, McCain teamed up with the Ontario Teachers' Pension Plan to buy Maple Leaf Foods in 1995. He previously served as the chairman of the board for the company, and his son Michael is currently the CEO.

== Death ==
McCain died on May 13, 2011, of pancreatic cancer. He was 81. He was residing in Toronto, Ontario, at the time of his death. A $5 million gift from Wallace and Margaret McCain was used to establish The Wallace McCain Centre for pancreatic cancer at Princess Margaret Cancer Centre. The centre will further the Princess Margaret's groundbreaking research into the causes and treatments of pancreatic cancer, as well as help establish a rapid diagnosis program.

== Personal life ==
In 1955, he married Margaret McCain, the first female Lieutenant Governor of New Brunswick.

== Accolades ==
In 1995, he was made an Officer of the Order of Canada for being "one of Atlantic Canada's most notable entrepreneurs" and was promoted to Companion in 2008. In 1993, he was inducted into Canadian Business Hall of Fame and the New Brunswick Business Hall of Fame in 1997. In 2003, he was awarded the Order of New Brunswick.

He has received honorary degrees from Mount Allison University, the University of King's College, the University of New Brunswick, the University of Toronto and St. Francis Xavier University.
