= Harrison McCain =

Canadian businessman

Harrison McCain CC ONB
- Born: Harold Harrison McCain; 3 November 1927; Florenceville-Bristol, New Brunswick, Canada
- Died: 18 March 2004 (aged 76); Boston, Massachusetts, U.S.
- Education: Acadia University
- Spouse: Marion McNair (m. 1952)
- Relatives: Wallace McCain (brother); Margaret McCain (sister-in-law); Michael McCain (nephew)

Harold Harrison McCain CC ONB (3 November 1927 – 18 March 2004) was a Canadian businessman and co-founder, along with his three brothers, of international frozen foods giant McCain Foods.

== Early life ==
McCain was born in Florenceville-Bristol, New Brunswick, as the son of Andrew Davis McCain, a descendant of a settler from Castlefinn, County Donegal, Ireland who became a well-respected seed potato farmer. Since 1900, the family sold seed potatoes throughout New Brunswick and exported to Cuba and Latin America.

== Career ==
After graduating from Acadia University, Harrison (the 3rd son) and his brother Wallace (the 4th son) worked for oil and gas company Irving Oil. In 1956, on their brother Robert suggestions, Harrison and Wallace with their brothers Robert and Andrew founded one of the first factories to process potatoes, turning them into frozen french fries. With the benefit of ensured quality and the ability to export long distances with a value added product, the business started growing. With Harrison's personal and business skills and the close relationship with his brother Wallace, the McCain Foods business eventually grew to over 55 factories worldwide and the number one french fry company in the world. In the 1990s a prolonged legal dispute between Harrison and Wallace over succession to the company leadership led to the departure of Wallace and his son Michael from McCain Foods. Harrison named his nephew, Allison McCain, son of his late brother Andrew, as his successor in 2002.

=== Ventures ===
McCain was a member of the board of directors of the Bank of Nova Scotia and a close personal friend of the bank's chairman Cedric Ritchie who grew up in the neighboring community of Upper Kent.

== Canadian honours ==
In 1992, he was named to the Order of Canada as a companion, the highest degree.

== Personal life ==
He is father to Gillian McCain co-author (with Legs McNeil) of Please Kill Me: The Oral History of Punk (Grove Press, 1996) as well as two volumes of poetry, Tilt (Hard Press, 1997) and Religion (The Figures, 1999). He was married to Marion "Billie" McCain, daughter of the former premier of New Brunswick John McNair.

He died of kidney failure in Boston, Massachusetts, on 18 March 2004.
