= Maurice LeClair =

Canadian Physician, businessman, civil servant, and academic (1927–2020)

J. Maurice LeClair
- Born: June 19, 1927; Sayabec, Quebec
- Died: April 25, 2020 (aged 92)
- Awards: Order of Canada

J. Maurice LeClair CC (June 19, 1927 – April 25, 2020) was a Canadian physician, businessman, civil servant, and academic.

== Biography ==
Born in Sayabec, Quebec, he received a Bachelor of Science degree in 1947 and a Doctor of Medicine degree in 1951 from McGill University. In 1953, he became a General Practitioner in Shawinigan, Quebec. In 1955, he became a Fellow at the Mayo Clinic and received a Master of Science in Medicine in 1958 from the University of Minnesota. Returning to Canada in 1958, he became a consulting internist at the Notre Dame Hospital.

In 1962, he became Vice Dean of the Faculty of Medicine at the Université de Montréal and Head of the department in 1965. In 1968, he became Dean of the Faculty of Medicine at the Université de Sherbrooke. From 1968 to 1970, he was Vice President of the Medical Research Council of Canada.

From 1970 to 1974, LeClair was Deputy Minister of Health. In 1974, he joined the Ministry of Science and Technology and the Treasury Board in 1976.

In 1979, he joined the Canadian National Railway as a Corporate Vice President becoming president and chief executive officer from 1982 to 1986. From 1987 to 1992, he was the vice-chairman of CIBC.

== Honours ==
- In 1980, he was made an Officer of the Order of Canada.
- In 1985, he was promoted to Companion of the Order of Canada.
- In 2004, he was inducted into the Canadian Medical Hall of Fame.

Business positions
Preceded by Robert Bandeen	President of Canadian National Railway; 1982 – 1986	Succeeded by Ronald E. Lawless
