= Donald Gordon (Canadian businessman) =

Canadian businessman

- Born: 11 December 1901; Oldmeldrum, Scotland
- Died: 2 May 1969 (aged 67); Montreal, Quebec
- Spouse: Maisie Barter (m. 1926)

Donald Gordon, CC CMG (11 December 1901 – 2 May 1969) was a Scottish-Canadian businessman and the former President of the Canadian National Railways from 1950 to 1966.

Born in Oldmeldrum, Scotland, Gordon came to Canada at an early age. At 15, he joined the Bank of Nova Scotia in Toronto, becoming assistant chief accountant and assistant manager of the Toronto branch. In 1935, he was appointed Secretary of the newly formed Bank of Canada and later became deputy governor. At the outbreak of war, Gordon was appointed Chairman of the Foreign Exchange Control Board, and then from 1941 to 1947, he was Chairman of the Wartime Prices and Trade Board. He became a national figure in Canada during these years, as the WPTB had control over all wages and prices in Canada, and touched the lives of all Canadians. He was also asked to meet with United States economic experts as the USA came into the war, and the U.S. modelled much of its price policy on the Canadian experience. After the war, Gordon was the Canadian representative on the newly formed International Bank for Reconstruction and Development. From 1950 to 1966, he was Chairman and President of the Canadian National Railways. During his colourful career at this post, he re-organised the company, and brought an ailing and bankrupt company into profit.

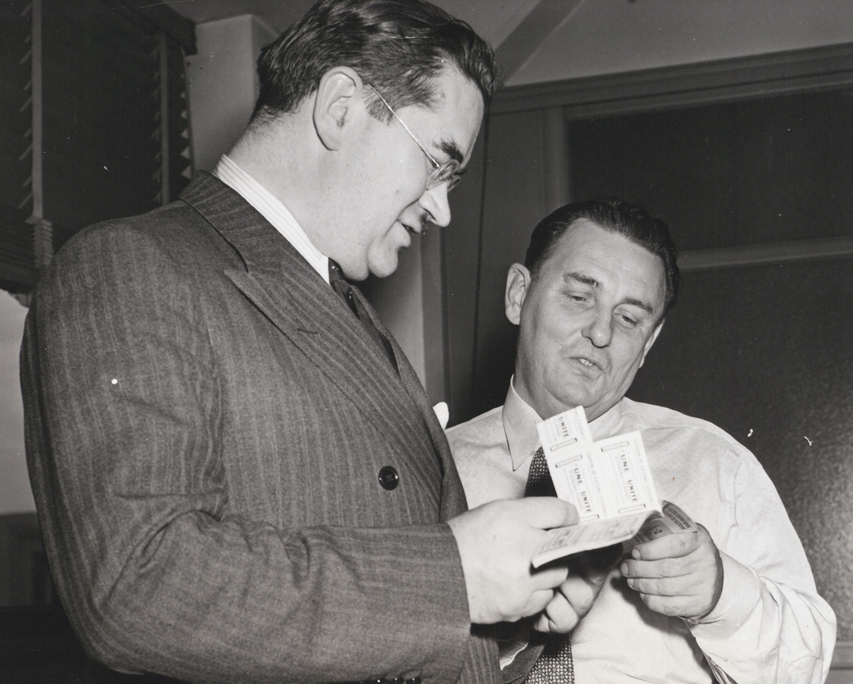
Donald Gordon, 1901-1969 showing a ration book to U.S price administrator Leon Henderson

Gordon was involved in the controversy over naming the Queen Elizabeth Hotel, after its founding in Montreal. Quebec nationalists wanted it called Château Maisonneuve in honour of Montreal's founder, Paul Chomedey de Maisonneuve. Gordon decided it should be named for Queen Elizabeth II, who had unexpectedly come to the throne in 1952 while the hotel was still on the drawing boards.

He was also involved in a controversy in 1962 when he said that no French-Canadian was competent enough to be vice-president of the Canadian National Railway. The febrile atmosphere of the time seized upon these words to imply that he was anti-French, so he proceeded to justify this statement in a more defendable way in the extensive interviews and television appearances made afterwards. He remained a figure of controversy for Quebec nationalists for whom he represented a certain type of English-speaking businessman.

In 1944, he was made a Companion of the Order of Saint Michael and Saint George. And, in 1968, he was made a Companion of the Order of Canada.

Queen's University in Kingston, Ontario has honoured Gordon, naming a university residence Donald Gordon House, and its conference centre Donald Gordon Centre. He is a member of the Canadian Business Hall of Fame. He was given honorary degrees by several Canadian Universities, including McGill University. He was also a Knight of Grace of the Order of St John of Jerusalem.

Business positions
| Preceded by Robert Charles Vaughan | President of Canadian National Railway; 1950 – 1966 | Succeeded by Norman J. MacMillan |
