= Joseph Sedgwick =

Joseph Sedgwick CC QC (24 November 1898 – 27 December 1981) was a Canadian lawyer.

He was born in Leeds, England and became a lawyer in 1923 following studies at the University of Toronto and Osgoode Hall. Sedgwick contributed to changes in the Criminal Code through a Royal Commission in the early 1950s. He was counsel to George and Viola R. MacMillan in the 1964 Royal Commission to probe the activity of Windfall Oil and Mines Ltd. Politically, he was Progressive Conservative. He also served as Treasurer for the Law Society of Upper Canada from 1962 to 1963.

His honours include Queen's Counsel (awarded in 1933, then known as King's Counsel) and the Order of Canada (awarded rank of Companion in 1974).

Sedgwick died in Toronto aged 83, predeceased by his wife Emma Irene McLaughlin. The couple had two children.

== Arms ==
Coat of arms of Joseph Sedgwick
Notes Recorded at the College of Arms, 5 June 1963. Crest A wolf’s head between reeds proper, pendent from the lower jaw by a cord Gules an inkhorn Sable garnished Or. Escutcheon Or on a bend cotised dancetty Sable between six cinquefoils Gules, a bend of fusils conjoined Ermine. Motto Come What Will
