= Phil Gold =

Canadian physician, scientist, and professor

Phil Gold CC GOQ FRSC FRCPC
- Born: September 17, 1936 (age 89); Montreal, Quebec
- Education: McGill University
- Awards: Order of Canada; National Order of Quebec

Phil Gold (born September 17, 1936) is a Canadian physician, scientist, professor and author.

Born in Montreal, Quebec, he received a BSc degree in 1957, a MSc degree in 1961, a MD degree in 1961, and a PhD in 1965 from McGill University. He obtained his Royal College of Physicians and Surgeons of Canada fellowship certification in Internal Medicine in November 1966.

In 1965, he co-discovered with Samuel O. Freedman the carcinoembryonic antigen (CEA), which resulted in a blood test used in the diagnosis and management of people with cancer.

He is the Douglas G. Cameron Professor of Medicine, and Professor of Physiology and Oncology, at McGill University. He was Chairman of the Department of Medicine at McGill and Physician-in-Chief at the Montreal General Hospital.

In 1978, he was made an Officer of the Order of Canada and promoted to Companion in 1985. In 1989, he was made an Officer of the National Order of Quebec and promoted to Grand Officer in 2019. In 1977, he was made a Fellow of the Royal Society of Canada. In 1978, he was awarded the Gairdner Foundation International Award, awarded to three to six people for outstanding discoveries or contributions to medical science. He was awarded the Queen Elizabeth II Silver Jubilee Medal and the 125th Anniversary of the Confederation of Canada Medal. On April 13, 2010, he was inducted into the Canadian Medical Hall of Fame.

== Books ==
- Freedman, Samuel O.; Gold, Phil (1976). Clinical Immunology. Hagerstown, Md.: Harper & Row. ISBN 0-06-140834-4. OCLC 2189449.
- Gold, Phil (2023). Gold's Rounds. Montreal: McGill-Queen's University Press. ISBN 978-0-2280-1758-5. OCLC 1350839675.

== Honours ==
- In 1977, he was made a Fellow of the Royal Society of Canada.
- In 1977, he was awarded the Queen Elizabeth II Silver Jubilee Medal.
- In 1978, he was awarded the Gairdner Foundation International Award.
- In 1978, he was awarded the Johann-Georg-Zimmerman Prize for Cancer Research.
- In 1978, he was made an Officer of the Order of Canada.
- In 1982. He won the Manning Innovation Award for Development of a Cancer Blood test. 1982.
- In 1985, he was promoted to Companion of the Order of Canada.
- In 1985, he received the Izaak Walton Killam Memorial Prize.
- In 1989, he was made an Officer of the National Order of Quebec and appointed Grand Officer in 2019.
- In 1992, he received the National Cancer Institute of Canada R.M. Taylor Medal.
- In 1992, he was awarded 125th Anniversary of the Confederation of Canada Medal.
- In 2002, he was awarded the Queen Elizabeth II's Golden Jubilee Medal.
- In 2004, he was awarded the American Association for Clinical Chemistry (AACC) Edwin F. Ullman Award.
- In 2010, he was inducted into the Canadian Medical Hall of Fame.
- In 2012, he was awarded the Queen Elizabeth II Diamond Jubilee Medal.
- In May 2018, he was granted an honorary doctorate of science at Queen's University at Kingston in conjunction with the Queen's Faculty of Medicine class of 2018 convocation.
- On May 22, 2019, he received an honorary doctorate from the University of British Columbia (UBC).
- On October 27, 2022 he received the McGill Medal at McGill University.
