= Upper Sackville, New Brunswick =

Community in New Brunswick, Canada

Coordinates: 45°55′46″N 64°20′56.9″W

Upper Sackville in New Brunswick

Upper Sackville is a Canadian rural community in Westmorland County, New Brunswick. Located in the Sackville Parish approximately 6 kilometres northwest of Sackville

== See also ==
- List of communities in New Brunswick
