= Armand Frappier =

Canadian physician and microbiologist (1904–1991)

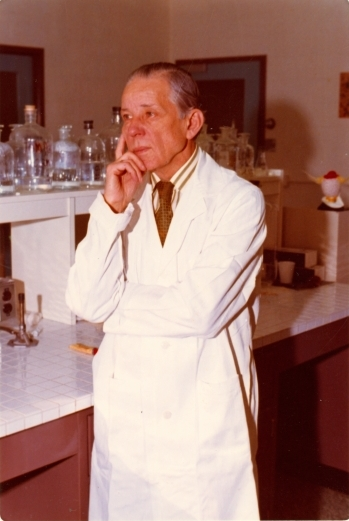
- Born: November 26, 1904; Salaberry-de-Valleyfield, Quebec, Canada
- Died: December 17, 1991 (aged 87)
- Occupation(s): physician, microbiologist
- Awards: Order of Canada; National Order of Quebec; Order of the British Empire

Armand Frappier CC GOQ OBE MSRC (November 26, 1904 – December 17, 1991) was a Canadian physician, microbiologist, and expert on tuberculosis from Quebec.

Born in Salaberry-de-Valleyfield, Quebec, the son of Arthur-Alexis Frappier and Bernadette Codebecq, his mother died in 1923 from tuberculosis. This greatly affected him and he pursued a career devoted to fighting this tueuse de maman (mother killer). In 1924, he received a Bachelor of Arts and, in 1930, he received a medical degree from the Université de Montréal. In 1933, he obtained a Bachelor of Science also from the Université de Montréal.

In 1938, he founded the Institut de microbiologie et d'hygiène de Montréal - following the model of the Pasteur Institute in Paris and the Connaught Laboratories of the University of Toronto (Malissard, 1998; 1999a, 1999b, 2000)- the first French-language school of hygiene in the world, and served as its director for 38 years. It was renamed Institut Armand-Frappier in 1975.

He was instrumental in the fight against tuberculosis in Canada and as one of the first researchers to confirm the safety and usefulness of the Bacillus Calmette-Guérin vaccine.

In 1929, he married Thérèse Ostiguy. They had four children: Lise, Monique, Michèle, and Paul.

== Honours ==
- He was named Officer of the Order of the British Empire by King George VI, upon the recommendation of the Canadian government.
- In 1969, he was made a Companion of the Order of Canada.
- In 1985, he was made a Grand Officer of the National Order of Quebec.
- In 1993, the Quebec government created the Prix Armand-Frappier in his honour, given every year to a scientist in recognition of his or her career.
- He was a Fellow of the Royal Society of Canada
- On January 17, 2000, Canada Post honoured him with a stamp entitled, Armand Frappier: Champion Disease Fighter.
- In 2012, he was inducted into the Canadian Medical Hall of Fame.
