= Alphonse Ouimet =

Canadian civil servant (1908–1988)

Joseph-Alphonse Ouimet
- Born: June 12, 1908; Montreal, Quebec
- Died: December 20, 1988 (aged 80)
- Known for: President of the Canadian Broadcasting Corporation
- Awards: Order of Canada

Joseph-Alphonse Ouimet, CC (June 12, 1908 – December 20, 1988) was a Canadian television pioneer and president of the Canadian Broadcasting Corporation (CBC) from 1958 to 1967.

Born in Montreal, Ouimet received a degree in electrical engineering from McGill University in 1932. In 1932, he helped design, build, and demonstrate the first Canadian television set. In 1934, he joined the Canadian Radio Broadcasting Commission, which became the CBC, and was responsible for setting up and running CBC's national radio service. He was involved in launching television broadcasting on the CBC.

After retiring from the CBC, Ouimet became, in 1969, chairman of Telesat Canada, which built and launched many of Canada's communications satellites. He retired in 1980.

In 1968, Ouimet was made a Companion of the Order of Canada.

Ouimet died in 1988 in the city of his birth.

Government offices
Preceded by Davidson Dunton	President of the Canadian Broadcasting Corporation; 1958–1967	Succeeded by George Forrester Davidson
