= Roger Blais (geological engineer) =

Canadian geological engineer and academic

Roger A. Blais
- Born: February 4, 1926; Shawinigan, Quebec
- Died: September 25, 2009 (aged 83); Montreal, Quebec
- Occupation(s): geological engineer and academic
- Awards: Order of Canada; National Order of Quebec

Roger A. Blais, CC OQ MSRC (February 4, 1926 – September 25, 2009) was a Canadian geological engineer and academic. He helped develop a number of prospecting and exploration technologies.

Born in Shawinigan, Quebec, he graduated from Université Laval and from the University of Toronto. In 1970, he was appointed a professor in economic geology and the first director of research at École Polytechnique de Montréal. He was the father of two children.

== Honours ==
In 1975 he was awarded the Royal Society of Canada's Bancroft Award. In 1984 he was made an Officer of the Order of Canada and was promoted to Companion in 2002. In 1995 he was made an Officer of the National Order of Quebec. In 1997, he was awarded the Government of Quebec's Prix Armand-Frappier. He was a Fellow of the Royal Society of Canada and of the Engineering Institute of Canada.
