= Order of New Brunswick =

Civilian honour for merit in Canada

- Insignia of the Order of New Brunswick

Awarded by the lieutenant governor of New Brunswick
- Type: Order of merit (provincial)
- Founded: 20 December 2000
- Status: Currently constituted
- Founder: Marilyn Counsell
- Chancellor: Louise Imbeault
- Grades: Member
- Post-nominals: ONB

Statistics
- First induction: 11 October 2002

Precedence
- Next (higher): Order of Manitoba
- Next (lower): Order of Nova Scotia
- Ribbon bar of the order

The Order of New Brunswick (Note: French: Ordre du Nouveau Brunswick) is a civilian honour for merit in the Canadian province of New Brunswick. Established by the Order of New Brunswick Act, which was granted royal assent on 20 December 2000, it is the highest honour conferred by the New Brunswick Crown. The order is intended to honour current or former New Brunswick residents who have demonstrated a high level of individual excellence and achievement. The lieutenant governor is Chancellor of the order and is responsible for inducting new members.

== History ==
Provincial orders began to be implemented following the establishment of the Canadian honours system in 1967. Quebec was the first province to seek formal recognition of its order, requesting its inclusion in the order of precedence in 1984. On 9 May 1991, all provincial orders that had been created thus far were recognized by the federal government via Order-in-Council 1991-841. Every province and territory thereafter came to create their own order.

The Order of New Brunswick was implemented through the Order of New Brunswick Act, which was introduced for first reading in the Legislative Assembly on 7 December 2000 and received royal assent on 20 December 2000. The Daily Gleaner reported on 20 November 2001 that Premier Bernard Lord hinted at the possibility of Queen Elizabeth II presenting the first awards, as she would be in the province at the time the ceremony was taking place. The first members of the order were invested on 11 October 2002, and the following reception was attended by Queen Elizabeth and Prince Philip. There were ten inaugural appointments to the order, in addition to Lieutenant Governor Marilyn Trenholme Counsell who was appointed ex officio.

== Eligibility and appointment ==
The Order of New Brunswick is intended to honour any current or former long-term resident of New Brunswick who has demonstrated a high level of individual excellence and achievement, having "made outstanding contributions to the social, cultural or economic well-being of New Brunswick and its residents." It is the highest honour amongst all those conferred by the New Brunswick Crown. There are no limits on how many can belong to the order, though inductions are limited to five per year. (Note: The Order of New Brunswick initially allowed for ten inductions per year. In 2023, the Order of New Brunswick Act was amended to reduce the number of appointments per year from ten to five.) Canadian citizenship is a requirement, and members of a governmental body as well as judges are ineligible as long as they hold office.

The process of finding qualified individuals begins with submissions from the public to the Order of New Brunswick Advisory Council. The council consists of the Chief Justice of New Brunswick or the Chief Justice of The Court of King's Bench of New Brunswick, who serves as the chair; the Clerk of the Executive Council, or their designate; the president of a university in the province; and three to five residents of New Brunswick appointed by Executive Council. Under the Order of New Brunswick Act, the committee is required to meet at least once annually to make its recommendations to Executive Council. Posthumous nominations are accepted in exceptional circumstances, and an individual who dies after being nominated may still be appointed to the order. The lieutenant governor, ex officio a member and the Chancellor of the order, then makes all appointments into the order's single grade of membership. New members are thereafter entitled to use the post-nominal letters ONB.

== Insignia ==
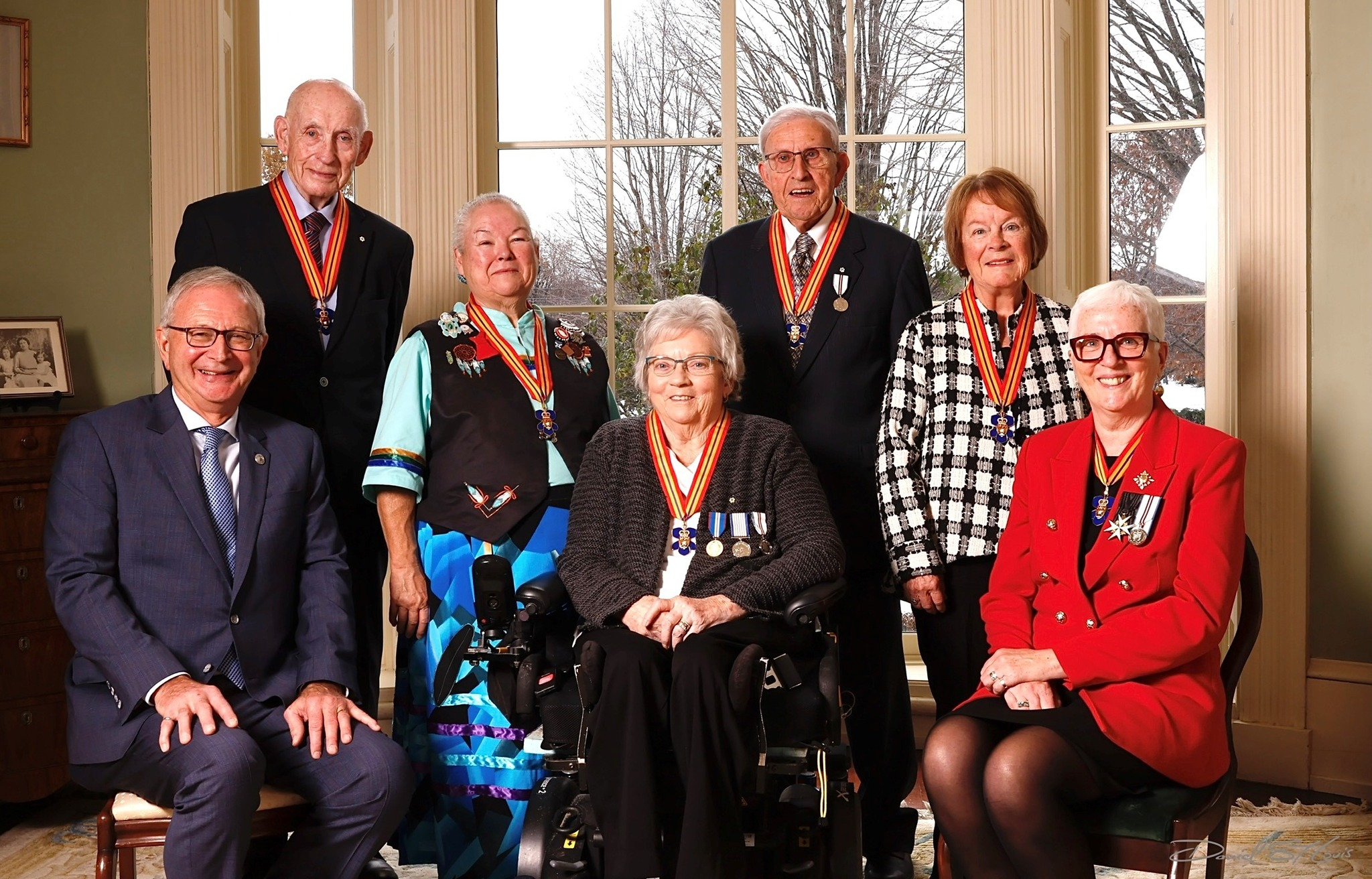
The 2023 recipients wearing the insignia of the order

Upon admission into the Order of New Brunswick, the lieutenant governor presents the order's insignia to the recipient in a formal ceremony at Government House in Fredericton. The insignia consists of a badge in the form of a stylized violet, the official provincial flower. The obverse of the badge is enamelled in deep blue, bearing at its centre the escutcheon of the arms of New Brunswick, all surmounted by a Royal Crown. The reverse of the badge features a three-digit number. The 38 mm (1.5 in) ribbon is patterned with vertical stripes in blue, red, and gold; the badge is attached to the ribbon via a 21 mm (0.83 in) gold loop. Members of the order also receive a lapel pin featuring a miniature version of the insignia.

== Inductees ==
This is a list of notable members of the Order of New Brunswick who have received news coverage as a result of their induction:

- Louis Robichaud PC CC ONB QC – 25th premier of New Brunswick, appointed 2002
- Claude Roussel CM ONB – sculptor, appointed 2002
- K. C. Irving OC ONB – businessman, appointed 2003
- Wallace McCain CC ONB – businessman, appointed 2003
- Fred Cogswell CM ONB – poet, appointed 2004
- Bernard Lord ONB KC – 30th premier of New Brunswick, appointed 2007
- Max Aitken, Lord Beaverbrook PC ONB – businessman and politician, appointed posthumously 2011
- Raymond Fraser ONB – author, appointed 2012
- Arthur Irving OC ONB – businessman, appointed 2012
- Ron Turcotte CM ONB – jockey, appointed 2012
- Kevin Vickers ONB SC – politician and police officer, appointed 2015
- Deborah Lyons ONB – diplomat, appointed 2016
- Measha Brueggergosman ONB – singer, appointed 2017
- Abraham Beverley Walker ONB – lawyer, appointed posthumously 2019
- Bud Bird PC OC ONB – businessman and politician, appointed 2023
- Robert Irving ONB – industrialist, appointed 2024

== See also ==
- Symbols of New Brunswick
- Orders, decorations, and medals of the Canadian provinces
- Canadian honours order of wearing
