= List of presidents of the Canadian National Railway Company =

== Presidents ==
List of presidents of the Canadian National Railway (CN) since 1919:

=== Presidents ===
The railway's logo.

Term(s)	Name	Country
1919-1921	David Blyth Hanna	Canada
1922-1932	Sir Henry W. Thornton	USA
1932-1941	Samuel J. Hungerford	Canada
1941-1949	Robert Charles Vaughan	Canada
1950-1966	Donald Gordon	Canada
1967-1974	Norman John MacMillan	Canada
1974-1982	Robert Angus Bandeen	Canada
1982-1986	J. Maurice LeClair	Canada
1986-1992	Ronald E. Lawless	Canada
1992-2002	Paul M. Tellier	Canada
2002-2010	E. Hunter Harrison	USA
2010-2016	Claude Mongeau	Canada
2016-2018	Luc Jobin	Canada
2018-2022	Jean-Jacques Ruest	Canada
2022-	Tracy A. Robinson	Canada

== See also ==
- Canadian National Railway
