= Robert Vaughan =

Robert Vaughan may refer to:

== Politicians ==
- Robert Vaughan (MP for Grampound) (fl. 1554–55), English member of parliament for Grampound
- Robert Vaughan (MP for New Radnor) (fl. 1524–75 or later), represented New Radnor
- Sir Robert Vaughan, 2nd Baronet (1768–1843), British member of parliament for Merioneth
- Robert Lee Vaughan (1927–1993), American politician from Mississippi

== Others ==
- Bob Vaughan (born 1945), British mathematician
- Robert Charles Vaughan (railway executive) (1883–1966), Canadian railway executive
- Robert Vaughan (antiquary) (died 1667), Welsh antiquary and manuscript collector
- Robert Vaughan (author) (born c. 1930s), American author
- Robert Vaughan (cricketer) (1834–1865), Australian cricketer
- Robert Vaughan (minister) (1795–1868), English minister of the Congregationalist communion
- Robert Alfred Vaughan (1823–1857), English Congregationalist minister and author, son of Robert Vaughan (1795–1868)
- Robert E. Vaughan (1888–1969), American head football coach for the Wabash College Little Giants
- Robert Vaughn (Montana rancher) (Robert Vaughan, 1836–1918), Welsh-American Montanan rancher and pioneer
- Robert Vaughan (engraver), English engraver
- Robert Vaughan, a character in the 1973 novel Crash and its 1996 movie adaptation

== See also ==
- Robert Vaughan Gorle (1896–1937), British Army officer
- Robert Vaughn (disambiguation)
- Robert Charles Vaughan (disambiguation)
