= Tracy Robinson =

Tracy Robinson may refer to:

== Business ==
- Tracy A. Robinson - CEO of Canadian National Railway

== Academia ==
- Tracy S. Robinson - attorney and senior lecturer at the University of the West Indies

== Media ==
- Tracy Robinson (Emmerdale) – Fictional character from soap opera Emmerdale
