= Robert Charles Vaughan =

Robert Charles Vaughan may refer to:

- Robert Charles Vaughan (railway executive) (1883–1966), Canadian railway executive
- Bob Vaughan (born 1945), British mathematician
