= Montrain =

Montrain was a Canadian National Railway subsidiary responsible for the operation of the former Agence métropolitaine de transport's (AMT) Deux-Montagnes, Mont-Saint-Hilaire and Mascouche commuter train lines using CN trackage.

Montrain maintained offices in Montreal's Central Station and a warehouse/workshop/maintenance base adjacent to the Deux Montagnes train station.

All operation of the AMT (now RTM) trains and service were taken over by Bombardier beginning July 1, 2017, on an 8-year contract.
