= RMS Lady Hawkins =

Canadian mail ship sank by Germany in World War II

Coordinates: 35°00′N 72°18′W

History

Canada
- Name: RMS Lady Hawkins
- Namesake: Katherine, Lady Hawkins
- Owner: Lady Hawkins Ltd
- Operator: Canadian National Steamship Co
- Port of registry: (Canada) Halifax, Nova Scotia
- Route: Boston – Bermuda – Caribbean – British Guiana
- Builder: Cammell Laird, Birkenhead, England
- Yard number: 939
- Launched: 16 August 1928
- Completed: November 1928
- Identification: Official number 155047; Call sign (1934–42) VGZP
- Fate: Torpedoed and sunk, 19 January 1942

General characteristics
- Class & type: Lady-class ocean liner
- Tonnage: 7,988 GRT; tonnage under deck 5,340; 4,920 NRT
- Length: 419.5 ft (127.9 m)
- Beam: 59.1 ft (18.0 m)
- Depth: 28.2 ft (8.6 m)
- Decks: 3
- Propulsion: steam turbines; twin screw
- Speed: 14 knots (26 km/h)
- Crew: 107
- Sensors & processing systems: direction finding equipment
- Armament: DEMS
- Notes: sister ships: Lady Drake, Lady Nelson, Lady Rodney, Lady Somers

RMS Lady Hawkins was a steam turbine ocean liner. She was one of a class of five sister ships popularly known as "Lady boats" that Cammell Laird of Birkenhead, England, built in 1928 and 1929 for the Canadian National Steamship Company (CNS or CN). The five vessels were Royal Mail ships that CN operated from Halifax, Nova Scotia, and the Caribbean via Bermuda. In 1942 the German submarine U-66 sank Lady Hawkins in the North Atlantic, killing 251 of the 322 people aboard.

== Building and peacetime service ==
Cammell Laird of Birkenhead, on the Wirral in England built all five Lady liners, and completed Lady Hawkins in November 1928.

Lady Hawkins was an oil-burner, with a set of four Cammell Laird steam turbines driving the propeller shafts to her twin screws by single-reduction gearing. She had three passenger decks, and by 1931 she was equipped with a direction finding device.

CN introduced the liners which became known as "Lady boats" for mail, freight and passenger traffic between Canada, Bermuda and the Caribbean. The company wanted to develop Canadian exports including lumber, and imports to Canada including fruit, sugar and molasses. Each Lady liner had refrigerated holds for perishable cargo such as fruit, and capacity for 100,000 bunches of bananas. Their hulls were painted white, which then was a relatively new fashion among shipping companies, and confined largely to passenger ships serving tropical or sub-tropical destinations.

Lady Drake, Lady Hawkins and Lady Nelson sailed fortnightly between Halifax and British Guiana via Boston, Bermuda, the Leeward Islands, the Windward Islands and Barbados. In summer the route was extended to the Port of Montreal. CN named each of its five new liners after the wife of an English or British admiral who was noted for his actions in the Caribbean, and who had been knighted or ennobled. Lady Hawkins was named after Katherine, the wife of the Elizabethan Admiral Sir John Hawkins (1532–1595).

== War service and loss ==
In January 1942 Lady Hawkins sailed from Montreal for Bermuda and the Caribbean. She called at Halifax and Boston, and by the time she left Boston she was carrying 2,908 tons of general cargo and 213 passengers as well as her complement of 107 officers, crew and Defensively Equipped Merchant Ship (DEMS) gunners. At least 53 of her passengers were Royal Navy and Royal Naval Volunteer Reserve personnel, and at least another 55 were civilians, including at least 15 from the British West Indies and four from the United States.

Approximate position of Lady Hawkins' wreck

On the morning of 19 January 1942 the ship was sailing unescorted about 150 nautical miles (280 km) off Cape Hatteras, taking a zigzag course to make her more difficult to hit, when at 07:43 U-66 commanded by Korvettenkapitän Robert-Richard Zapp hit her with two stern-launched torpedoes. The liner sank in about 30 minutes.

Three of her six lifeboats were damaged, but the other three were launched. One was commanded by her chief officer. It had capacity for 63 people but managed to embark 76 survivors. Its occupants could hear more people in the water, but could neither see them in the dark nor take them aboard the overcrowded boat if they had found them.

The boat had no radio transmitter and very limited rations of drinking water, ship's biscuit and condensed milk. It shipped water and needed constant baling, but it had a mast, sail and oars and Chief Officer Percy Kelly set a course west toward the United States' Atlantic coast sea lanes and land. The boat was at sea for five days, in which time five of its occupants died. Then the survivors sighted the Agwilines vessel Coamo and signalled her with a flashlight. (Note: Atlantic, Gulf & West Indies Lines (Agwilines) delivered Coamo to the U.S. War Shipping Administration (WSA) on 11 February 1942 (Maratime Administration record) almost immediately after the rescue described. The ship was then allocated to US Army use but was never army owned or bareboat chartered. Agwilines operated the ship under general agency agreement as WSA's agent until presumed lost in December 1942 after being ordered to sail independently from a Gibraltar-U.K. convoy by the British Admiralty and never reaching the destination. (Charles, Roland W. (1947). Troopships of World War II; p. 176) The Coamo was sunk 2 December 1942 by U-604) Coamo's master misread the flashes as an enemy submarine preparing to attack, and was going to continue without stopping. It was only when the survivors shone the light on the boat's sail that he correctly understood their signal. Coamo rescued the boat's 71 surviving occupants, landing them at San Juan, Puerto Rico, on 28 January.

Of the three lifeboats launched, only Chief Officer Kelly's was found. Including the five who died in that boat, a total of 251 people from Lady Hawkins were lost. They were the ship's master Captain Huntley Giffen, 85 other members of the crew, one DEMS gunner and 164 of her passengers, including a naval chaplain, Amyas Shaw (Temporary Chaplain RNVR) and two distressed British seamen (i.e., survivors from previous sinkings). The 71 survivors whom Coamo rescued were Percy Kelly, 21 crew and 49 passengers.

== RMS Lady Drake ==
Soon after Lady Hawkins's sinking, Kelly was promoted to captain and made master of one of her sister ships, Lady Drake. On 5 May 1942 U-106 sank Lady Drake about 90 nautical miles (170 km) north of Bermuda, killing six passengers and six crew. Kelly, 141 passengers and 113 of his crew survived and were rescued by the US Navy minesweeper USS Owl, which landed them on Bermuda.

== Awards ==
On 27 October 1942 two of Lady Hawkins's able seamen, Ernest Rice and Clarence Squires, were commended in naval citations. On 22 December 1942 Captain Kelly was made a member of the Order of the British Empire for his leadership in saving lives from Lady Hawkins. He was also awarded Lloyd's War Medal for Bravery at Sea.

== Sources and further reading ==
- Crabb, Brian James (2006). Beyond the Call of Duty. The Loss of British Commonwealth Mercantile and Service Women at Sea During the Second World War. Donington: Shaun Tyas. ISBN 1 900289 66-0.
- Hannington, Felicity (1980). The Lady Boats: The Life and Times of Canada's West Indies Merchant Fleet. Halifax, NS: Canadian Marine Transportation Centre, Dalhousie University. ISBN 0770301894.
- Hocking, Charles (1989). Dictionary of Disasters at Sea During the Age of Steam, Including Sailing Ships and Ships of War Lost in Action, 1824–1962. London: London Stamp Exchange. ISBN 0948130725.
