= RMS Lady Nelson =

Steam turbine ocean liner

- Lady Nelson as hospital ship

History

Canada
- Name: RMS Lady Nelson
- Namesake: Frances Nelson, wife of Royal Navy Admiral Horatio Nelson
- Owner: Canadian National Steamship Co
- Port of registry: (Canada) Halifax, Nova Scotia
- Route: Halifax-Boston – Bermuda – Caribbean – British Guiana
- Builder: Cammell Laird, Birkenhead
- Launched: 17 July 1928
- Completed: 1928
- Identification: Official number: 155040; IMO number: 5013260; Call sign: VGZN
- Fate: Scrapped 1968

General characteristics
- Class & type: Lady-class ocean liner
- Tonnage: 7,988 GRT; tonnage under deck 5,340; 4,920 NRT
- Length: 419.5 ft (127.9 m)
- Beam: 59.1 ft (18.0 m)
- Depth: 28.2 ft (8.6 m)
- Decks: 3
- Propulsion: Steam turbines; twin screw
- Speed: 14 knots (26 km/h)
- Crew: 107
- Sensors & processing systems: direction finding equipment
- Notes: sister ships: Lady Drake, Lady Hawkins, Lady Rodney, Lady Somers

RMS Lady Nelson was a steam turbine ocean liner which served in passenger service from 1928 to 1968 and operated as wartime hospital ship from 1943 to 1945. One of a class of five sister ships popularly known as "Lady boats", she was built for the Canadian National Steamship Company (CNS). The five vessels were Royal Mail ships that CNS operated from Halifax, Nova Scotia, and the Caribbean via Bermuda. Lady Nelson was sold to Egyptian owners in 1953 and served as Gumhuryat Misr and Alwadi until she was scrapped in 1968.

== Building and peacetime service ==
Lady Nelson was built in 1928 by Cammell Laird of Birkenhead, on the Wirral in England, the same builder for all five Lady class liners. Like her sisters Lady Nelson was an oil-burner, with a set of four Cammell Laird steam turbines driving the propeller shafts to her twin screws by single-reduction gearing. She had three passenger decks, and by 1931 she was equipped with a direction finding device.

CN introduced the liners which became known as "Lady boats" for mail, freight and passenger traffic between Canada, Bermuda and the Caribbean. Lady Nelson along with Lady Hawkins and Lady Drake were designed for service to eastern islands of the British West Indies and had larger passenger capacity but lesser cargo capacity than Lady Rodney and Lady Somers who were built for service to western islands. The hulls of all the Lady boats were painted white, which then was a relatively new fashion among shipping companies, and confined largely to passenger ships serving tropical or sub-tropical destinations.

After her launch, Lady Nelson was introduced to Canadian ticket and travel agents when the ship hosted a special lunch, press conference and tour to introduce the "Lady boats" on 27 November 1928 at Pier 21 in Halifax, Nova Scotia, where the ships were acclaimed as "the finest boats afloat" in North America. The ships were introduced at the same time as Canada opened the Pier 21 ocean liner terminal in Halifax designed to give Canada a competitive presence in Atlantic travel routes.

Lady Nelson sailed fortnightly between Halifax and British Guiana via Boston, Bermuda, the Leeward Islands, the Windward Islands and Barbados. In summer the route was extended to the port of Montreal. CN named each of its five new liners after the wife of an English or British admiral who was noted for his actions in the Caribbean. Lady Nelson's namesake was Frances Nelson, wife of the famous Royal Navy Admiral Horatio Nelson.

== War service ==
Lady Nelson was torpedoed by U-161 on 10 March 1942 while alongside at Castries, St. Lucia. Fifteen passengers and three crewmen were killed. The ship sank at the wharf but was refloated in late March and towed to Mobile, Alabama, United States, for repairs.

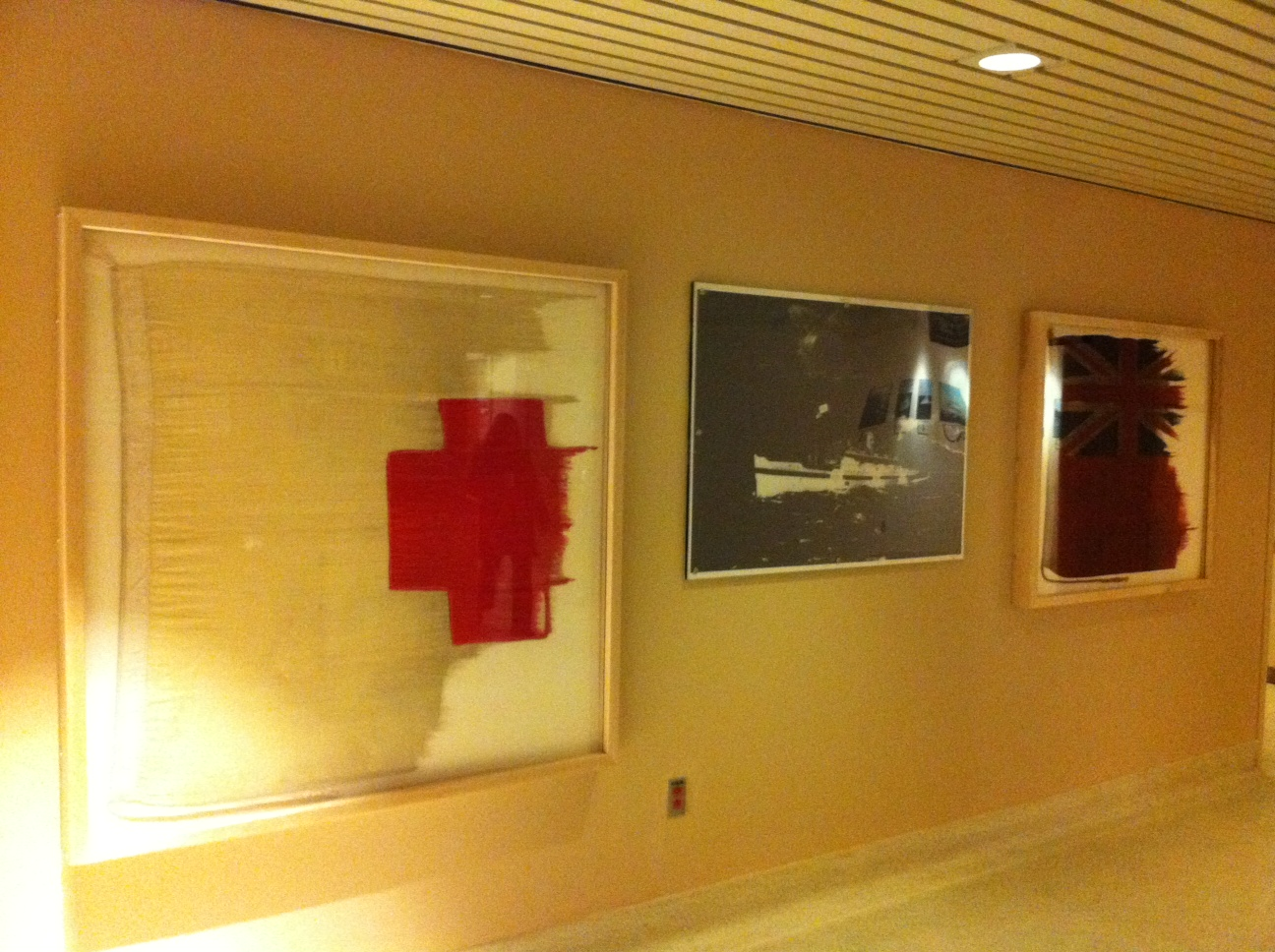
Lady Nelson hospital ship flag at Stadacona Hospital CFB Halifax

The Canadian government decided to convert Lady Nelson to a hospital ship to bring home Canadian wounded. Canadians had previously been sent home for treatment on British hospital ships, but as casualties mounted from fighting in North Africa, the British asked Canada to provide its own hospital ships. Although informally called HMCS or HMCHS Lady Nelson by her crew, she remained owned by Canadian National Steamships, under charter by the Canadian Department of National Defence and retained a civilian crew of 75 from the Canadian Merchant Navy and 100 medical staff from the Canadian Army. Completed as a hospital ship in April 1943, Lady Nelson had an operating theatre, x-ray machine and wards for 515 men. A special medical embarkation unit was created at Pier 21 in Halifax to unload patients and transfer and escort them on hospital trains which took the wounded to hospitals across Canada. As a hospital ship, Lady Nelson made 30 crossings of the Atlantic and brought 25,000 wounded Canadians home. When fighting ended in Europe in June 1945, Lady Nelson was switched to returning Canadian soldiers and war brides.

== Postwar ==
Lady Nelson returned to civilian duties in 1946, the only Lady boat, along with Lady Rodney, to survive the war. However declining passenger traffic due to air travel, high fuel consumption from the ship's turbine engines and rising labour costs made the Lady boats too expensive to run. It was decided to replace the two Lady boats with motor vessels with smaller passenger capacity in 1951. In 1952 Lady Nelson and Lady Rodney were sold to Egyptian owners for $750,000. After being refitted at Alexandria and then renamed, they were used to carry passengers in the Mediterranean and Red Seas. Under her new owner, the Khedivial Mail line, Lady Nelson was renamed Gumhuryat Misr, later becoming Alwadi in 1960 until she was scrapped in 1968.

== Legacy ==
A large model of the ship in hospital colours is displayed at the Canadian Museum of Immigration at Pier 21 in Halifax at the terminal where Lady Nelson operated for most of her career. A short street at CFB Halifax is named Lady Nelson Road in her honour. The Naval Museum of Halifax owns a 1944 painting by Wilfred Leonard Whitern of Lady Nelson and her original hospital ship flags which are displayed in the Stadacona Health Centre at CFB Halifax. Lady Nelson is also the subject of two paintings in the war art collection of the Canadian War Museum in Ottawa.
