= Robert Vaughn (disambiguation) =

Robert Vaughn (1932–2016) was an American actor.

Bobby, Bob, Rob or Robert Vaughn may also refer to:

== Sportsmen ==
- Bobby Vaughn (baseball) (1885–1965), American infielder
- Bob Vaughn (born 1945), American football offensive guard
- Bobby Vaughn (born c.1975), American surfer and co-founder of Von Dutch clothing company
- Rob Vaughn (born 1987), American baseball catcher and coach

== Others ==
- Robert Vaughn (Australian politician) (1833–1908), member of New South Wales Legislative Assembly
- Robert Vaughn (Montana rancher) (1836–1918), Welsh-American Montana pioneer

== See also ==
- Robert Vaughan (disambiguation)
