= Claude Mongeau =

Canadian railroad executive

Claude Mongeau is a Canadian railroad executive who served as the president and chief executive officer of Canadian National Railway (CNR) from January 1, 2010, to July 1, 2016. He succeeded Hunter Harrison. While serving as president of CN, he worked to mend strained relationships with the railway's customers and partners by establishing various service agreements. He currently serves on the board of directors at Norfolk Southern Railway.

== Early life and education ==
Claude Mongeau was born in St-Hyacinthe, Quebec. He attended McGill University Desautels Faculty of Management, the Institut Supérieur des affaires (France), and the Université du Québec à Montréal.

== Career ==
Mongeau began his railroad career when he joined CN in 1994. He held the positions of vice-president of strategic and financial planning, and assistant vice-president of corporate development. He was appointed executive vice-president and chief financial officer in October 2000.

Before joining CN, Mongeau was a partner with Groupe Secor, a Montreal-based management consulting firm providing strategic advice to large Canadian corporations such as Bombardier and Bell Canada. He also worked in the business development unit of Imasco Inc., a diversified holding company with subsidiaries operating in the manufacturing, retail, and financial services sectors. His career started in Europe with Bain & Company, a leading American consulting firm.

Mongeau was recognized as one of Canada's top 40 executives under 40 by the Financial Post Magazine in 1997. In 2005, an independent committee of leading Canadian business figures named him Canada's CFO of the Year.

On April 26, 2017, CN announced that the training centre would be named after Mongeau.

=== Canadian National Railway ===
Claude Mongeau was president and CEO of Canadian National Railway from 2010 to 2016, previously serving as CFO for almost a decade.

Mongeau's promotion to CEO resulted in the resignation of several senior executives. Four years into his tenure, the company experienced a 73% increase in mainline derailments, which The Globe and Mail described as a "deterioration" of its safety record. As a result, Mongeau's bonus was reduced.

During his overall tenure, operating ratio declined from 63.6% to 55.9%.

He stepped down in 2016 due to throat cancer. Chief Financial Officer Luc Jobin replaced him.

=== Norfolk Southern Railway ===
Mongeau, who has served as an independent director on the Norfolk Southern board of directors since 2019, was appointed as the chairman of the board in 2024. Mongeau's new role as chairman of the board also includes chairing the executive committee, reflecting his time in the railway industry. His appointment comes during a critical time for Norfolk Southern in managing the aftermath of the 2023 East Palestine, Ohio, derailment.

=== SNC-Lavalin ===
Mongeau was a member of the board and audit committee of SNC-Lavalin while he was working full-time as the CEO of Canadian National. While he was on the board at SNC-Lavlin, the company was caught paying bribes to government officials in Libya, amounting to $48 million over a decade.

While on the audit committee, Mongeau helped oversee an investigation into the scandal, leading to the resignation of the CEO and the company being charged with fraud and corruption. During the audit committee investigation, the Financial Post wrote a story critical of full-time CEOs serving on the boards of directors of other companies, calling out Mongeau by name.

Preceded by E. Hunter Harrison	President & CEO of Canadian National Railway; 2010 – July 1, 2016	Succeeded by Luc Jobin
