= Samuel James Hungerford =

Canadian Railway Executive

Samuel James Hungerford, CMG (16 July 1872 – 7 October 1955) was a Canadian railway executive. He was president of Canadian National Railway from 1934 to 1941, having been head of the system since 1932.

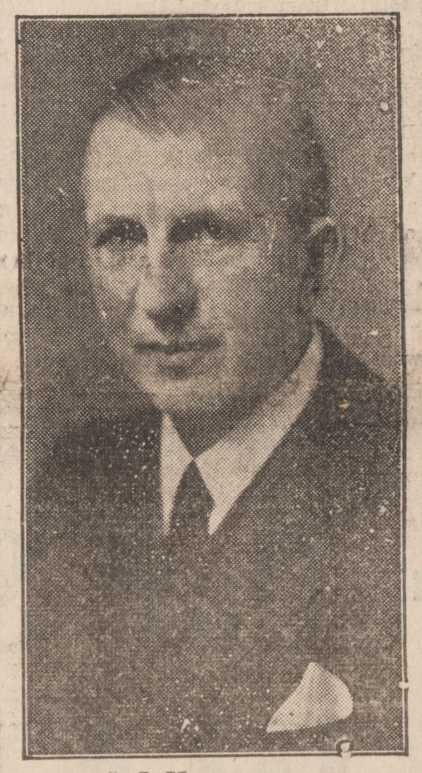
Hungerford, pictured in a 1938 newspaper

From 1937 to 1941, Hungerford was the first president of Trans-Canada Airlines. During the Second World War, he was president of the crown corporation National Railway Munitions. He was appointed CMG for his wartime services.
