= Robert Lee Vaughan =

American politician

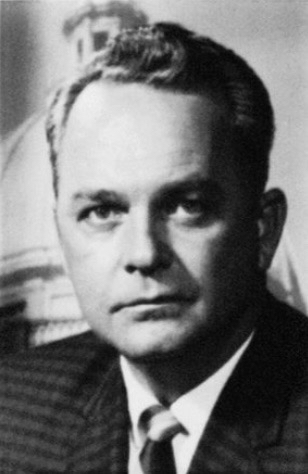

Member of the Mississippi House of Representatives
- In office 1965–1972
- Preceded by: R. L. Fox

Personal details
- Born: June 12, 1927 Kansas City, Missouri, U.S.
- Died: September 9, 1993 (aged 66) Port Gibson, Mississippi, U.S.

Robert Lee Vaughan (June 12, 1927 – September 9, 1993) was an American politician. He served as a member of the Mississippi House of Representatives.

== Life and career ==
Vaughan was born in Kansas City, Missouri. He was a feed mill operator.

In 1965, Vaughan was elected to the Mississippi House of Representatives after R. L. Fox resigned. He served until 1972.
