= Canadian National Railway =

Canadian Class I freight railway company

Canadian National Railway Company
- Compagnie des chemins de fer nationaux du Canada

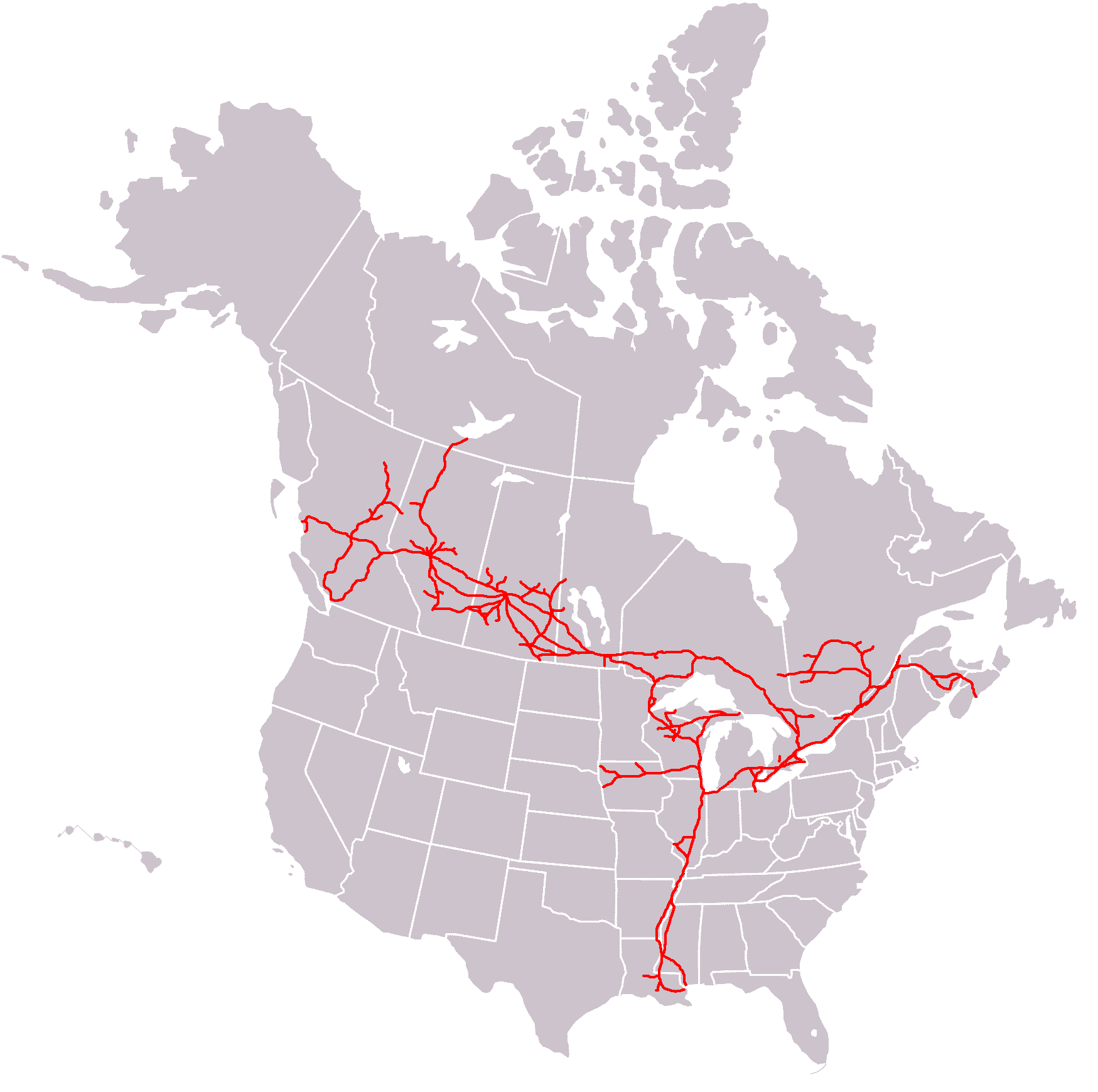
- System map

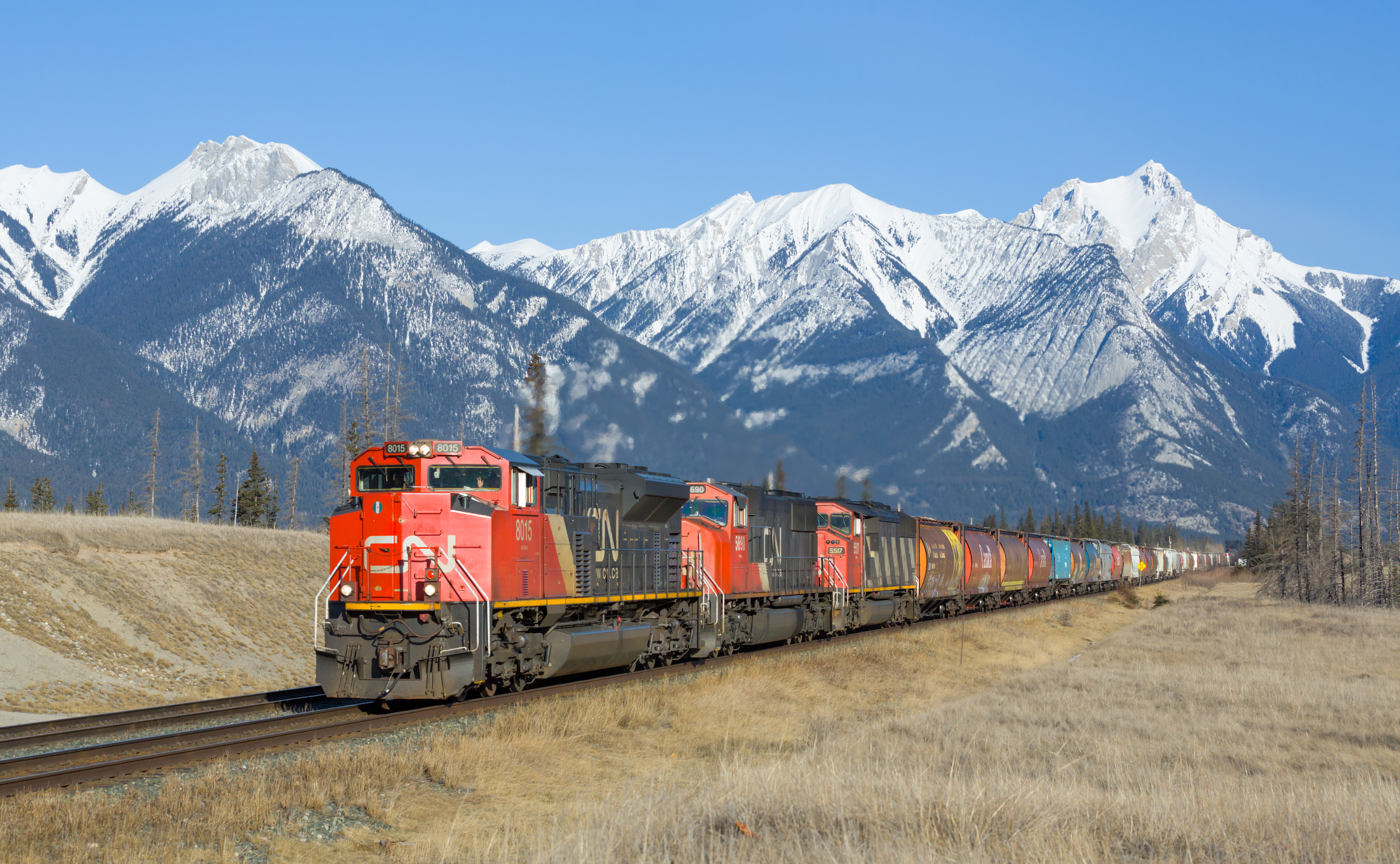
- A CN freight train in Alberta, Canada, pulled by three diesel-electric locomotives (types EMD SD70M-2, SD75I, and SD60F).

Overview
- Reporting mark: CN
- Locale: Canada, United States
- Dates of operation: June 6, 1919–present

Technical
- Track gauge: 1,435 mm (4 ft 8 1/2 in) standard gauge
- Previous gauge: 1,067 mm (3 ft 6 in)
- Length: 32,000 km (20,000 mi)

Other
- Website: www.cn.ca

Canadian National Railway Company

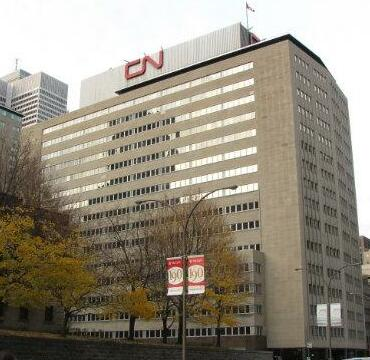
- The headquarters of CN in Downtown Montreal
- Native name: Canadian National Railway Company (Note: Section 14 of the CN Commercialization Act allows the company to be reincorporated under the Canada Business Corporations Act under the name "Canadian National Railway Company" and its French equivalent (i.e. without adding words such as "Incorporated", "Limited" or abbreviations or French equivalents)); Compagnie des Chemins de fer nationaux du Canada
- Formerly: Canadian National Railways (1919–1978)
- Type: Public
- Traded as: TSX: CNR; NYSE: CNI; S&P/TSX 60 component (CNR)
- Industry: Transport
- Predecessor: Canadian Northern Railway
- Founded: June 6, 1919; 107 years ago
- Headquarters: Montreal, Quebec, Canada
- Key people: Shauneen Bruder (Chair); Tracy Robinson (President and CEO)
- Revenue: ▲CA$17.05 billion (2024)
- Operating income: ▼CA$4.27 billion (2024)
- Net income: ▲CA$1.17 billion (2024)
- Total assets: ▲CA$57.07 billion (2024)
- Total equity: ▲CA$21.05 billion (2024)
- Number of employees: 24,671 (2024)
- Website: cn.ca

The Canadian National Railway Company (French: Compagnie des chemins de fer nationaux du Canada) (reporting mark CN) is a Canadian Class I freight railway headquartered in Montreal, Quebec, which serves Canada and the Midwestern and Southern United States. It is one of Canada's two main freight rail companies, along with Canadian Pacific Kansas City.

CN is Canada's largest railway, in terms of both revenue and the physical size of its rail network, spanning Canada from the Atlantic coast in Nova Scotia to the Pacific coast in British Columbia across approximately 20,000 route miles (32,000 km) of track. In the late 20th century, CN gained extensive capacity in the United States by taking over such railroads as the Illinois Central.

CN is a public company with 24,671 employees and, as of July 2024, a market cap of approximately US$75 billion. CN was government-owned, as a Canadian Crown corporation, from its founding in 1919 until being privatized in 1995. Today as a publicly held entity the company counts philanthropist Bill Gates as one of its largest shareholders.

== History ==
A 1954 logo of Canadian National, featuring the railway's name in a black box, surrounded by a red maple leaf.

The Canadian National Railways (CNR) was incorporated on June 6, 1919, comprising several railways that had become bankrupt and fallen into Government of Canada hands, along with some railways already owned by the government. Primarily a freight railway, CN also operated passenger services until 1978, when they were assumed by Via Rail. The only passenger services run by CN after 1978 were several mixed trains (freight and passenger) in Newfoundland, and several commuter trains both on CN's electrified routes and towards the South Shore in the Montreal area (the latter lasted without any public subsidy until 1986). The Newfoundland mixed trains lasted until 1988, while the Montreal commuter trains are now operated by Montreal's Exo.

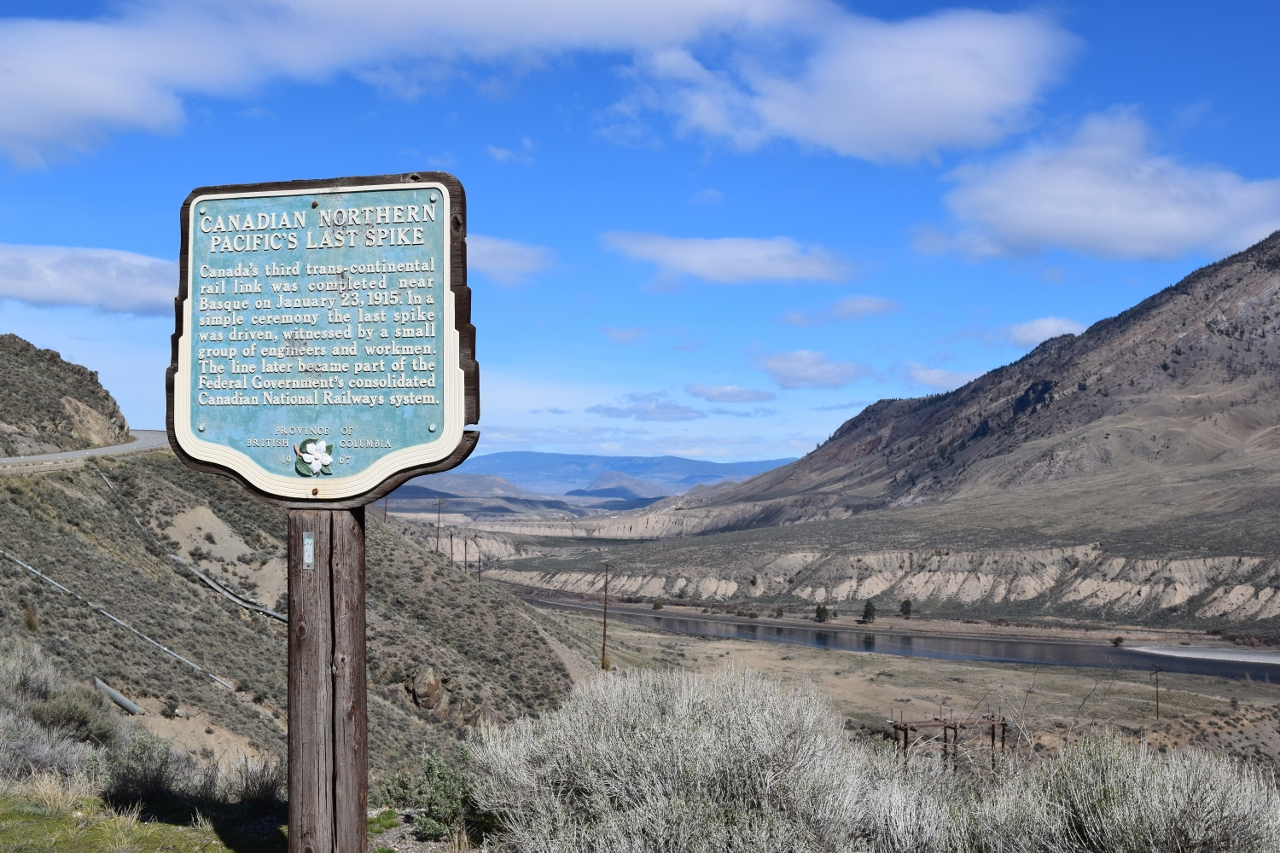
Historical marker at site of Canadian Northern's "last spike" near Ashcroft, British Columbia

On November 17, 1995, the Government of Canada privatized CN. Over the next decade, the company expanded significantly into the United States, purchasing Illinois Central Railroad in 1998 and Wisconsin Central Transportation in 2001, among others.

=== Creation of the company, 1918–1923 ===
The excessive construction of railway lines in Canada led to significant financial difficulties striking many of them in the years leading up to 1920. In response to public concerns, the Government of Canada assumed majority ownership of the near-bankrupt Canadian Northern Railway (CNoR) on September 6, 1918, and appointed a "Board of Management" to oversee the company. At the same time, CNoR was also directed to assume management of Canadian Government Railways (CGR), a system mainly comprising the Intercolonial Railway of Canada (IRC), National Transcontinental Railway (NTR), Prince Edward Island Railway (PEIR), and the Hudson Bay Railway (HBR). On December 20, 1918, the Government of Canada created the Canadian National Railways (CNR) – a body with no corporate powers – through Order in Council as a means to simplify the funding and operation of the various railway companies. The absorption of the Intercolonial Railway would see CNR adopt that system's slogan, The People's Railway. Another Canadian railway, the Grand Trunk Pacific Railway (GTPR), encountered financial difficulty on March 7, 1919, when its parent company Grand Trunk Railway (GTR) defaulted on repayment of construction loans to the Government of Canada.

The Canadian National Railway Company then evolved through the following steps:

- the "railways, works and undertakings of the Companies comprised in the Canadian Northern System" were vested in the newly incorporated Company in June 1919, with provision for the later inclusion of any of the Government Railways
- vesting of the Grand Trunk Pacific Railway System in the Minister of Railways and Canals, acting as Government Receiver, in March 1919
- acquisition of the Grand Trunk Railway System in November 1919, implemented in May 1920

GTR management and shareholders opposed to nationalization took legal action, but after several years of arbitration, the GTR was finally absorbed into the CNR on January 30, 1923. Although several smaller independent railways would be added to the CNR in subsequent years as they went bankrupt or it became politically expedient to do so, the system was more or less finalized at that point. However, certain related lawsuits were not resolved until as late as 1936.

Canadian National Railways was born out of both wartime and domestic urgency. Until the rise of the personal automobile and creation of taxpayer-funded all-weather highways, railways were the only viable long-distance land transportation available in Canada. As such, their operation consumed a great deal of public and political attention. Canada was one of many nations to engage in railway nationalization in order to safeguard critical transportation infrastructure during the First World War.

In the early 20th century, many governments were taking a more interventionist role in the economy, foreshadowing the influence of economists like John Maynard Keynes. This political trend, combined with broader geo-political events, made nationalization an appealing choice for Canada. The Winnipeg General Strike of 1919 and allied involvement in the Russian Revolution seemed to validate the continuing process. The need for a viable rail system was paramount in a time of civil unrest and foreign military action.

=== Acquisitions ===
==== Bessemer & Lake Erie Railroad ====
The B&LE was acquired with the purchase of Great Lakes Transportation and the DM&IR.

==== British Columbia Railway ====
In 2003, BCOL sold to Canadian National and leased the railroad to CN for 60 years.

==== Central Vermont Railway ====
Central Vermont was nationalized in 1918 and consolidated into the Grand Trunk Western in 1971 with the creation of the Grand Trunk Corporation.

==== Duluth, Missabe and Iron Range Railway ====
The DM&IR was purchased by Great Lakes Transportation and in 2011 the DM&IR was merged into CN's Wisconsin Central Subsidiary. The DM&IR was acquired at the same time as the Bessemer & Lake Erie Railroad.

==== Duluth, Winnipeg and Pacific Railway ====
The DWP was nationalized with CN in 1918 and became a part of CN's Grand Trunk Corporation in 1971. In 2011 the DWP was merged into the larger Wisconsin Central Subsidiary of CN.

==== Elgin, Joliet and Eastern Railway ====
In 2009, CN acquired the Elgin, Joliet and Eastern Railway to assist with traffic congestion in Chicago and the surrounding area. In 2013 EJ&E was merged into the greater Wisconsin Central Subsidiary of CN.

==== Grand Trunk Western Railroad ====
The GTW was merged with Central Vermont in 1971 with the creation of the Grand Trunk Corporation. In 1991 the GTW was merged with CN under the "North America" consolidation program. Many of GTWs locomotives and rolling stock would be repainted and the motive power would get the new CN scheme.

==== Illinois Central Railroad ====
In 1998, IC was purchased by CN, which also acquired the Chicago Central in the deal. A year later, the two railroads were formally amalgamated into the CN system.

==== Iowa Northern Railway ====
In 2023, CN acquired the Iowa Northern Railway, but the transaction is awaiting approval by the Surface Transportation Board (STB). On January 14, 2025, the STB approved the CN acquisition of the Iowa Northern Railway, a Class III shortline that specializes in the transport of grain, ethanol, and other bio-fuels commodities in the state of Iowa.

==== Mackenzie Northern Railway ====
In 2006, CN acquired Mackenzie Northern Railway, previously purchased by RailAmerica. This purchase allowed CN to increase their network footprint and hold the northernmost trackage of the contiguous North American railway network. Since being purchased by CN in 2006, it has been officially known as the Meander River Subdivision.

==== Newfoundland Railway ====
On March 31, 1949, CNR acquired the assets of the Newfoundland Railway, which in 1979 were reorganized into Terra Transport. CN officially abandoned its rail network in Newfoundland on October 1, 1988.

==== Savage Alberta Railway ====
On December 1, 2006, CN announced that it had purchased Savage Alberta Railway for $25 million and that it had begun operating the railway the same day.

==== TransX Group of Companies ====
In 2018, CN acquired the Winnipeg-based TransX Group of Companies. TransX continues to operate independently.

==== Wisconsin Central Ltd. ====
In January 2001, CN acquired the WC for $800 million.

=== CN's U.S. subsidiaries before privatization ===
In the late 1980s, CN's railway network consisted of the company's Canadian trackage, along with the following U.S. subsidiary lines: Grand Trunk Western Railroad (GTW) operating in Michigan, Indiana, and Illinois; Duluth, Winnipeg and Pacific Railway (DWP) operating in Minnesota; Central Vermont Railway (CV) operating down the Connecticut River valley from Quebec to Long Island Sound; and the Berlin subdivision to Portland, Maine, known informally as the Grand Trunk Eastern, sold to a short-line operator in 1989.

=== Privatization ===
In 1992, a new management team led by ex-federal government bureaucrats Paul Tellier and Michael Sabia started preparing CN for privatization by emphasizing increased productivity. This was achieved largely by cutting the company's management structure, laying off many employees, and continuing to abandon or sell branch lines. In 1993 and 1994, the company replaced the names CN, Grand Trunk Western, and Duluth, Winnipeg, and Pacific with CN North America. CPR and CN officials began to discuss a merger. When the idea was rejected by the Canadian government, CPR offered to purchase outright all of CN's lines from Ontario to Nova Scotia, while an unidentified U.S. railroad (rumoured to have been Burlington Northern Railroad) would purchase CN's lines in western Canada. This too was rejected. In 1995, the entire company, including its U.S. subsidiaries, reverted to using CN.

The CN Commercialization Act was enacted on July 13, 1995, and by November 28, 1995, the Government of Canada had completed an initial public offering (IPO) and transferred all of its shares to private investors. Under the legislation, no individual or corporate shareholder may own more than 15 percent of CN, and the company's headquarters must remain in Montreal, thus maintaining CN as a Canadian corporation.

=== Contraction and expansion since privatization ===
Following the successful IPO, CN has recorded impressive gains in its stock price, largely through an aggressive network rationalization and purchase of newer more fuel-efficient locomotives. Numerous branch lines were shed in the late 1990s across Canada, resulting in dozens of independent short line railway companies being established to operate former CN track that had been considered marginal. This network rationalization resulted in a core east–west freight railway stretching from Halifax to Chicago and Toronto to Vancouver and Prince Rupert. The railway also operated trains from Winnipeg to Chicago using trackage rights for part of the route south of Duluth.

In addition to the rationalization in Canada, the company also expanded in a strategic north–south direction in the central United States. In 1998, in an era of mergers in the U.S. rail industry, CN bought the Illinois Central Railroad (IC), which connected the already existing lines from Vancouver, British Columbia, to Halifax, Nova Scotia, with a line running from Chicago, Illinois, to New Orleans, Louisiana. This single purchase of IC transformed CN's entire corporate focus from being an east–west uniting presence within Canada (sometimes to the detriment of logical business models) into a north–south NAFTA railway (in reference to the North American Free Trade Agreement). CN was then feeding Canadian raw material exports into the U.S. heartland and beyond to Mexico through a strategic alliance with Kansas City Southern Railway (KCS).

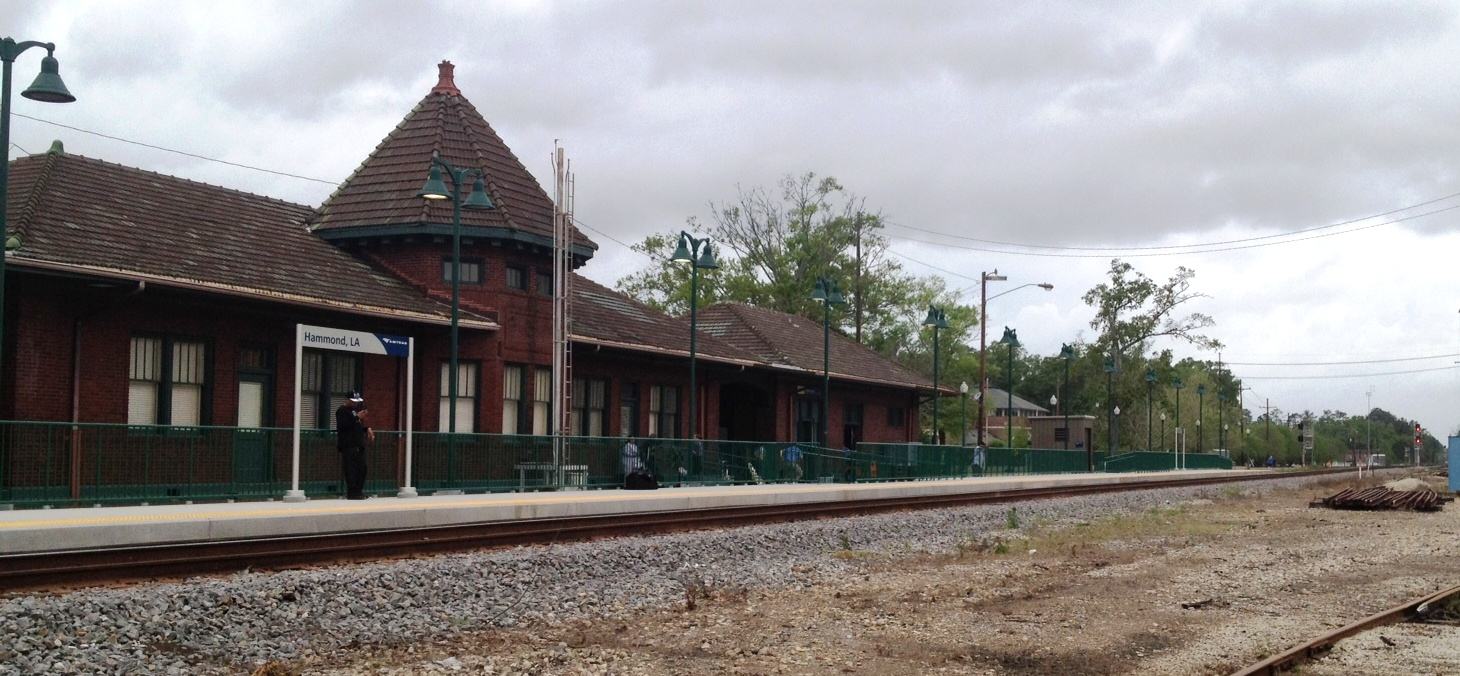
Properties of the CN in the United States serve, in many instances, as routes for Amtrak. Pictured is the Amtrak station in Hammond, Louisiana, refurbished with a modern passenger platform. This segment of the CN was built in 1854 to form part of the New Orleans, Jackson and Great Northern railway, which later became part of Illinois Central.

In 1999, CN and BNSF Railway, the second-largest rail system in the U.S., announced their intent to merge, forming a new corporate entity North American Railways, headquartered in Montreal to conform to the CN Commercialization Act of 1995. The merger announcement by CN's Paul Tellier and BNSF's Robert Krebs was greeted with skepticism by the U.S. government's Surface Transportation Board (STB), and protested by other major North American rail companies, namely CPR and Union Pacific Railroad (UP). Rail customers also denounced the proposed merger, following the confusion and poor service sustained in southeastern Texas in 1998 following UP's purchase of Southern Pacific Railroad two years earlier. In response to the rail industry, shippers, and political pressure, the STB placed a 15-month moratorium on all rail-industry mergers, effectively scuttling CN-BNSF plans. Both companies dropped their merger applications and have never refiled.

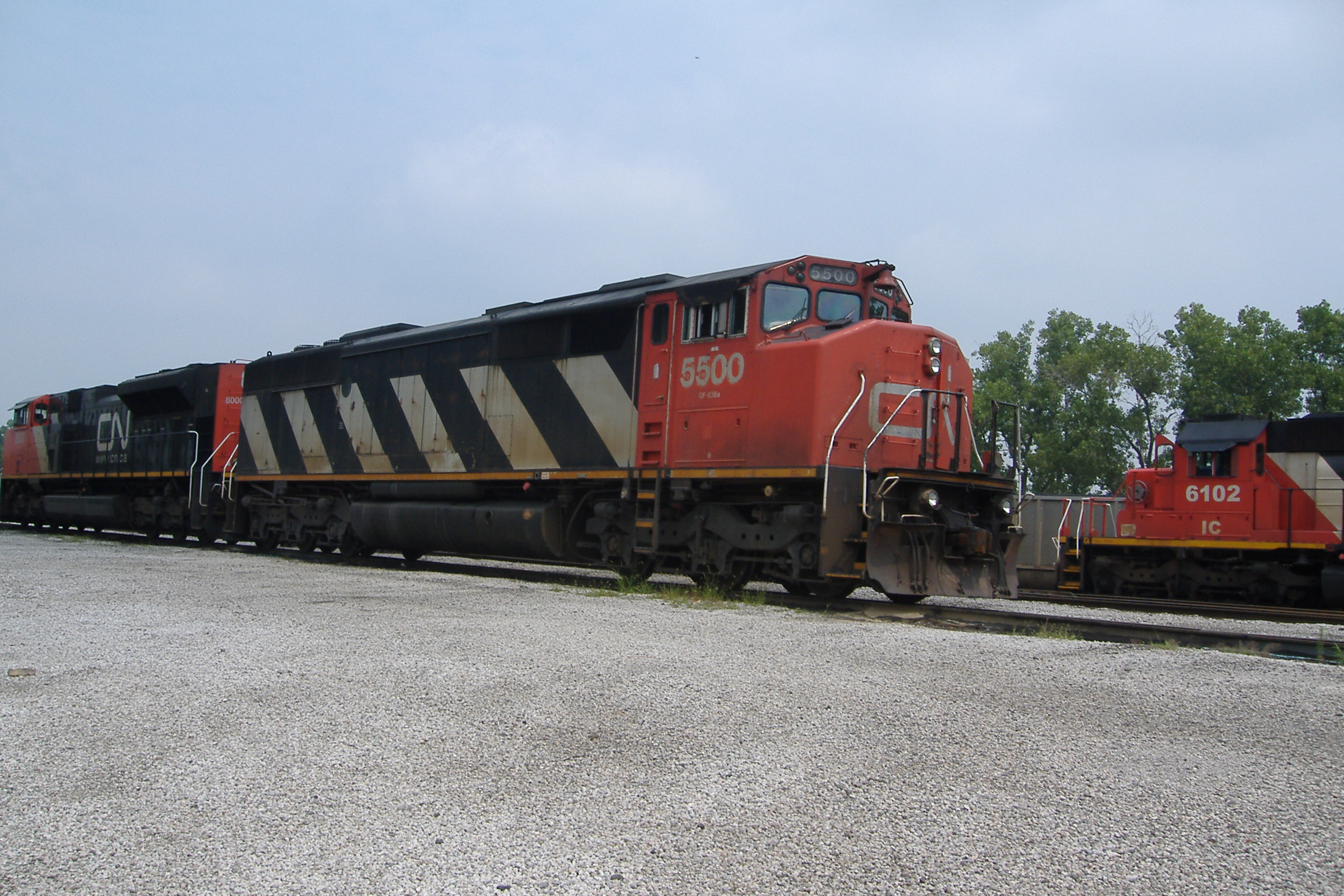
CN EMD SD60F parked in Toledo, Ohio

After the STB moratorium expired, CN purchased Wisconsin Central (WC) in 2001, which allowed the company's rail network to encircle Lake Michigan and Lake Superior, permitting more efficient connections from Chicago to western Canada. The deal also included Canadian WC subsidiary Algoma Central Railway (ACR), giving access to Sault Ste. Marie and Michigan's Upper Peninsula. The purchase of Wisconsin Central also made CN the owner of EWS, the principal freight train operator in the United Kingdom.

On May 13, 2003, the provincial government of British Columbia announced the provincial Crown corporation, BC Rail (BCR), would be sold with the winning bidder receiving BCR's surface operating assets (locomotives, cars, and service facilities). The provincial government is retaining ownership of the tracks and right-of-way. On November 25, 2003, it was announced CN's bid of CA$1 billion would be accepted over those of CPR and several U.S. companies. The transaction was closed effective July 15, 2004. Many opponents – including CPR – accused the government and CN of rigging the bidding process, though this has been denied by the government. Documents relating to the case are under court seal, as they are connected to a parallel marijuana grow-op investigation connected with two senior government aides also involved in the sale of BC Rail.

Also contested was the economic stimulus package the government gave cities along the BC Rail route. Some saw it as a buy-off to get the municipalities to cooperate with the lease, though the government asserted the package was intended to promote economic development along the corridor. Passenger service along the route had been ended by BC Rail a few years earlier due to ongoing losses resulting from deteriorating service. The cancelled passenger service has subsequently been replaced by a blue-plate tourist service, the Rocky Mountaineer, with fares well over double what the BCR coach fares had been.

CN also announced in October 2003 an agreement to purchase Great Lakes Transportation (GLT), a holding company owned by Blackstone Group for US$380 million. GLT was the owner of Bessemer & Lake Erie Railroad, Duluth, Missabe and Iron Range Railway (DM&IR), and the Pittsburgh & Conneaut Dock Company. The key instigator for the deal was that since the Wisconsin Central purchase, CN was required to use DM&IR trackage rights for a short 18 km (11 mi) "gap" near Duluth, Minnesota, on the route between Chicago and Winnipeg. To purchase this short section, CN was told by GLT it would have to purchase the entire company. Also included in GLT's portfolio were eight Great Lakes vessels for transporting bulk commodities such as coal and iron ore as well as various port facilities. Following Surface Transportation Board approval for the transaction, CN completed the purchase of GLT on May 10, 2004.

On December 24, 2008, the STB approved CN's purchase for $300 million of the principal lines of the Elgin, Joliet & Eastern Railway Company (EJ&E) (reporting mark EJE) from the U.S. Steel Corporation, originally announced on September 27, 2007. The STB's decision was to become effective on January 23, 2009, with a closure of the transaction shortly thereafter. The EJ&E lines create a bypass around the western side of heavily congested Chicago-area rail hub and its conversion to use for mainline freight traffic is expected to alleviate substantial bottlenecks for both regional and intercontinental rail traffic subject to lengthy delays entering and exiting Chicago freight yards. The purchase of the lightly used EJ&E corridor was positioned by CN as a boon not only for its own business but for the efficiency of the entire U.S. rail system.

On December 31, 2011, CN completed the merger of DM&IR, DWP, and WC into its Wisconsin Central Ltd. (WCL) subsidiary.

In March 2021, CN subsidiary WCL reached a deal to sell roughly 1,400 km (900 mi) of non-core rail lines and assets in Michigan, Wisconsin, and Ontario to short-line operator Watco.

In April 2021, CN bid nearly $30 billion for Kansas City Southern (KCS), ostensibly creating a bidding war between itself and CPR, who had placed a $25 billion bid for the company in March. CN's offer represented a 21percent premium to the one made by Canadian Pacific, offering $325 for each share and including $200 in cash. The move by CN was influenced by the projected economic upturn once the world began to emerge from the COVID-19 pandemic, with KCS's railroad network reaching from Canada, through the United States, and running along the Panama Canal. On May 21, CN and KCS agreed to merge, but lengthy regulatory approvals are required to put it into effect. However, on August 31, the US Surface Transportation Board (STB) denied a voting trust between CN and KCS. With the decision by the STB, KCS re-engaged with CP on CP's original offer. The merger between the Kansas City Southern and Canadian Pacific Railway was ultimately approved on March 15, 2023, and the two railroads merged on April 14, 2023.

After losing the battle against CP for the purchase of KCS, in hearings before the STB for the CP-KCS merger, CN filed a plan to acquire the KCS line linking Kansas City with Springfield, IL, St. Louis, MO and East St. Louis, IL, the former Gateway Western, tie it to its former IC Gilman Subdivision, and thus create a new corridor between Kansas City and St. Louis with Michigan and Eastern Canada, bypassing Chicago, and which, according to the plan presented by CN, divert 80,000 long haul-truck shipments to rail annually. A few months later, CN resigned its intentions to purchase the Springfield Line in order to try to obtain trackage rights on the line, always with the same intention of creating the corridor proposed in the original plan to purchase the line filed with the STB. Both the initial plan to purchase the line and the subsequent plan to acquire trackage rights included the execution of corridor improvement works, valued at more than US$250 million. The STB would ultimately reject plans submitted by CN to operate on the Springfield Line.

Due to a failure to reach an agreement with the Teamsters Canada Rail Conference Canadian National's Canadian operations, along with those of CPKC, shut down from August 22, 2024 as the companies engaged in a lockout.

In December 2023, CN set to acquire the Iowa Northern Railway (IANR) with the proposition to be reviewed by the Surface Transportation Board (STB). On January 14, 2025, the STB approved the CN acquisition of the Iowa Northern Railway.

== CN today ==
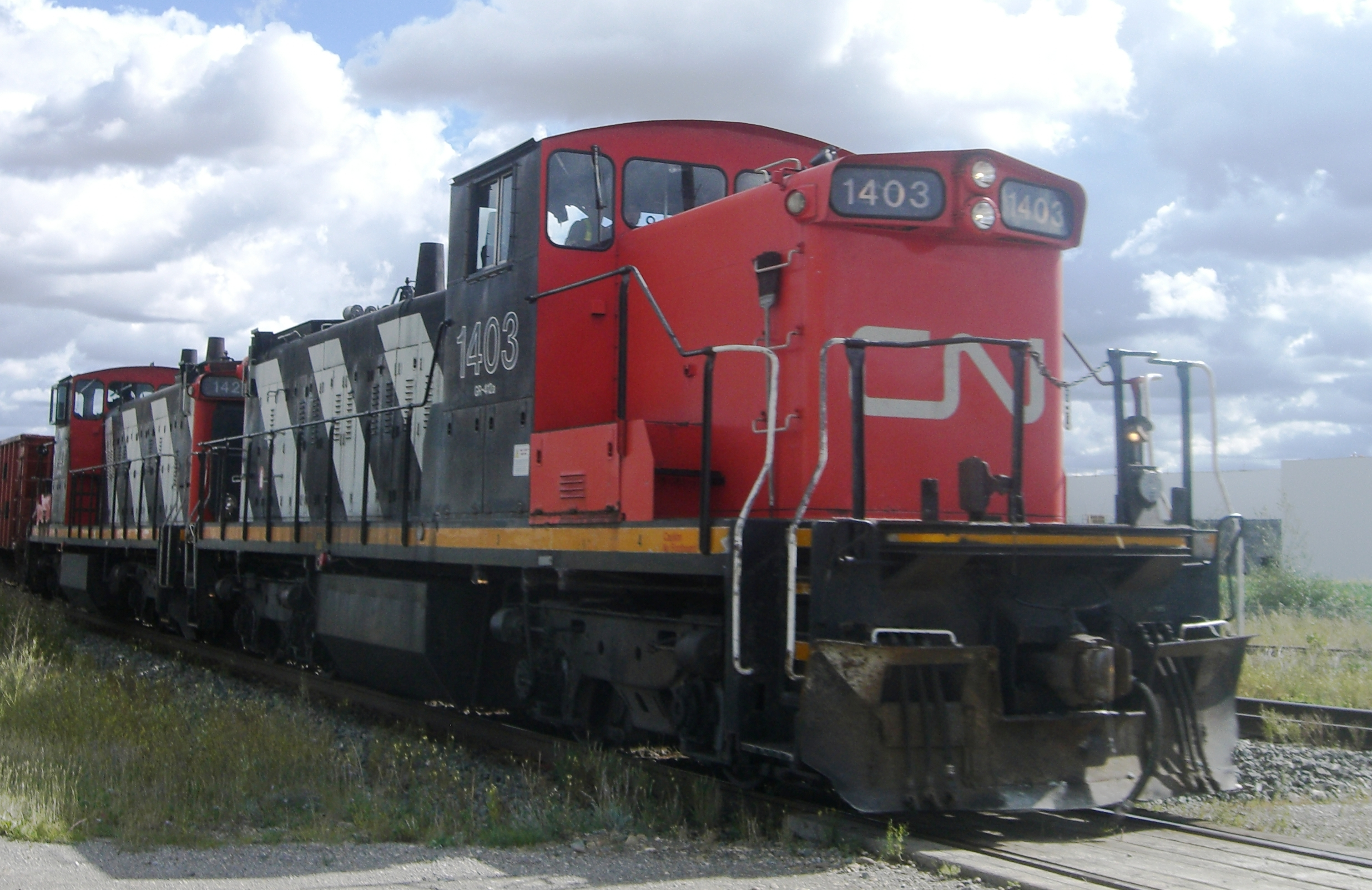
CN train at East Junction, Edmonton, 2006

Since the company operates in two countries, CN maintains some corporate distinction by having its U.S. lines incorporated under the Delaware-domiciled Grand Trunk Corporation for legal purposes; however, the entire company in both Canada and the U.S. operates under CN, as can be seen in its locomotive and rail car repainting programs.

Since the Illinois Central purchase in 1998, CN has been increasingly focused on running a "scheduled freight railroad/railway". This has resulted in improved shipper relations, as well as reduced the need for maintaining pools of surplus locomotives and freight cars. CN has also undertaken a rationalization of its existing track network by removing double track sections in some areas while extending passing sidings in other areas.

CN is also a rail industry leader in the employment of radio-control (R/C) for switching locomotives in yards, resulting in reductions to the number of yard workers required. CN has frequently been touted in recent years within North American rail industry circles as being the most-improved railroad in terms of productivity and the lowering of its operating ratio, acknowledging the fact the company is becoming increasingly profitable. Due to the rising popularity of ethanol, shuttle trains, and mineral commodities, CN Rail Service is increasing in popularity.

In 2011, the company was added to the Dow Jones Sustainability World Index.

=== Projects ===
In April 2012 a plan was announced to build an 800 kilometres (500 mi) railway that would run north from Sept-Îles, Quebec; the railway would support mining and other resource extraction in the Labrador Trough.

In September 2012, CN announced the trial of locomotives fuelled by natural gas as a potential alternative to conventional diesel fuel. Two EMD SD40-2 diesel-electric locomotives fuelled with 90 percent natural gas and 10 percent diesel were tested in service between Edmonton and Fort McMurray, Alberta.

=== Controversies ===
==== Accidents ====
- in 1986 near Dalehurst, Alberta, a CN westbound freight slammed into a Via Rail eastbound, killing 23 and injuring 71. The wreck was caused due to multiple factors caused by CN.
- In December 1999 the Ultratrain, a petroleum products unit train linking the Levis (Quebec) Ultramar oil refinery with a petroleum depot in Montreal, derailed into the path of an oncoming freight train, travelling in the opposite direction between Sainte-Madeleine and Saint-Hilaire-Est, south of Montreal. The two crew members on the freight train were killed in the ensuing explosion (the crew's last words were "you guys are derailed, we're hitting you!"). The Ultratrain derailed at a broken rail caused by a defective weld that was not fixed in time, despite being repeatedly reported by train crews; the report by the Transportation Safety Board of Canada called into question CN's quality assurance program for rail welds as well as the lack of detection equipment for defective wheels. In memory of the dead crewmen, two new stations on the line have been named after them (Davis and Thériault).
- On May 14, 2003, a trestle collapsed under the weight of a freight train near McBride, British Columbia, killing both crew members. Both men had been disciplined earlier for refusing to take another train on the same bridge, claiming it was unsafe. It was revealed that as far back as 1999, several bridge components had been reported as rotten, yet no repairs had been ordered by management. Eventually, the disciplinary records of both crewmen were amended posthumously.
- Two CN trains collided on August 4, 2007, on the banks of the Fraser River near Prince George, British Columbia. Several cars carrying gasoline, diesel and lumber burst into flames. Water bombers were used to help put out the fires. Some fuel had seeped into the Fraser River.

==== Derailments ====
- On May 27, 2002, a CN train derailed at 12:30 p.m. north of Vermontville Highway in Potterville, Michigan. The train was hauling a total of 58 cars. Thirty-five of the cars derailed and 11 of them contained hazmat material. Nine were carrying propane and two cars carried sulfuric acid. Two of the propane tankers were leaking and a third was suspected of leaking. Each propane car contains 34,000 gallons of propane gas which is considered an extreme fire and explosive hazard. An evacuation of Potterville was declared. CN along with other agencies worked throughout the week to clean the area.
- A second CN train derailment in Potterville, Michigan, occurred in May 2006, though no evacuation was necessary. The cause of this derailment was found to be a failed wheel bearing on the 82nd car.
- About 9:04 am central standard time on February 9, 2003, northbound CN freight train M33371 derailed 22 of its 108 cars in Tamaroa, Illinois. Four of the derailed cars released methanol, and the methanol from two of these four cars fueled a fire. Other derailed cars contained phosphoric acid, hydrochloric acid, formaldehyde, and vinyl chloride. Two cars containing hydrochloric acid, one car containing formaldehyde, and one car containing vinyl chloride released product but were not involved in the fire. About 850 residents were evacuated from the area within a 3-mile (4.8 km) radius of the derailment, which included the entire village of Tamaroa. Improper placement of bond wire welds on the head of the rail just outside the joint bars, where untempered martensite associated with the welds led to fatigue and subsequent cracking that, because of increased stresses associated with known soft ballast conditions, rapidly progressed to rail failure.
- On August 5, 2005, in the Cheakamus River derailment, a CN train had nine cars derail on a bridge over the Cheakamus River, causing 41,000 litres (11,000 US gal) of caustic soda to spill into the river, killing thousands of fish by caustic burns and asphyxiation. The CBC reported environmental experts say it would take the river 50 years or more to recover from the toxic pollution. CN is facing accusations from local British Columbians over the railway's supposed lack of response to this issue, touted as the worst chemical spill in British Columbia's history.
- A derailment at Moran, 20 miles (32 km) north of Lillooet, on June 30, 2006, has raised more questions about CN's safety policies. Two more derailments near Lytton in August 2006 have continued criticism. In the first case, 20 coal cars of a CPR train using a CN bridge derailed, dumping 12 cars of coal into the Thompson River. In the second case half a dozen grain cars spilled on a CN train.
- On June 19, 2009, a CN freight train derailed at a highway/rail grade crossing in Cherry Valley, Illinois (near Rockford). The train consisted of two locomotives and 114 cars, 19 of which derailed. All of the derailed cars were tank cars carrying denatured fuel ethanol, a flammable liquid, and thirteen were breached or lost product and caught fire. As a result of the fire that erupted after the derailment, a passenger in a car stopped at the crossing was fatally injured, two passengers in the same car received serious injuries, and five occupants of other cars waiting at the highway/rail crossing were injured. Two responding firefighters also sustained minor injuries. The release of ethanol and the resulting fire prompted a mandatory evacuation of about 600 residences within a 0.5-mile (0.80 km) radius of the accident site. Monetary damages were estimated to total $7.9 million. The probable cause of the accident was the washout of the track structure that was discovered about 1 hour before the train's arrival, and CN's failure to notify the train crew of the known washout in time to stop the train. Contributing factors were CN's failure to work with Winnebago County to develop a comprehensive storm water management plan to address previous washouts, CN's failure to issue the flash flood warning to the train crew, and the inadequate design of the train's DOT-111 tank cars.

==== Disputes ====
- In March 2004 a strike by the Canadian Auto Workers union showed deep-rooted divisions between organized labour and the company's current management.
- In October 2013 the James Street bridge between Thunder Bay and Fort William First Nation was subject to an act of arson causing great structural damage to the bridge. The bridge was the most direct route between Thunder Bay and Fort William First Nation reserve and was used by foot traffic, vehicular traffic, and rail traffic. The matter of who is responsible for the maintenance and repair of the bridge is subject to great controversy between the City of Thunder Bay and CN due to an agreement dating back to 1906 between the Grand Trunk Pacific Railway Company (later incorporated as CNR along with other railways) and the City of Fort William (later merged with the City of Port Arthur into the City of Thunder Bay). The 1906 Agreement states that "The Company will give the Municipal Corporation the perpetual right to cross said bridge for ... vehicle and foot traffic" and that "The Company will maintain the bridge in perpetuity without cost to the Town ...". After the fire, CN made repairs to the bridge for use of its rail system but did not repair the damage to the vehicle lanes which render it unsafe for vehicle use. CN maintains that the 1906 Agreement does not speak to replacement of the bridge while the position of the City of Thunder Bay is that CN is solely responsible for making the necessary repairs to restore function to the vehicle lanes of the bridge.
- At 12:01 a.m. on August 22, 2024, CN shut its operations and locked out thousands of Teamsters Canada union members. The lockout, however, lasted for less than a full day: By the afternoon of August 22, the Canadian government ordered CN to end the lockout and to arbitrate with its labour union.

==== Other incidents ====
- Controversy arose again in Canadian political circles in 2003 following the company's decision to refer solely to its acronym "CN" and not "Canadian National", a move some interpret as being an attempt to distance the company from references to "Canada". Canada's Minister of Transport at the time called this policy move "obscene" after nationalists noted it could be argued the company is no longer Canadian, being primarily owned by American stockholders. The controversy is somewhat tempered by the fact a majority of large corporations are being increasingly referred to by acronyms.

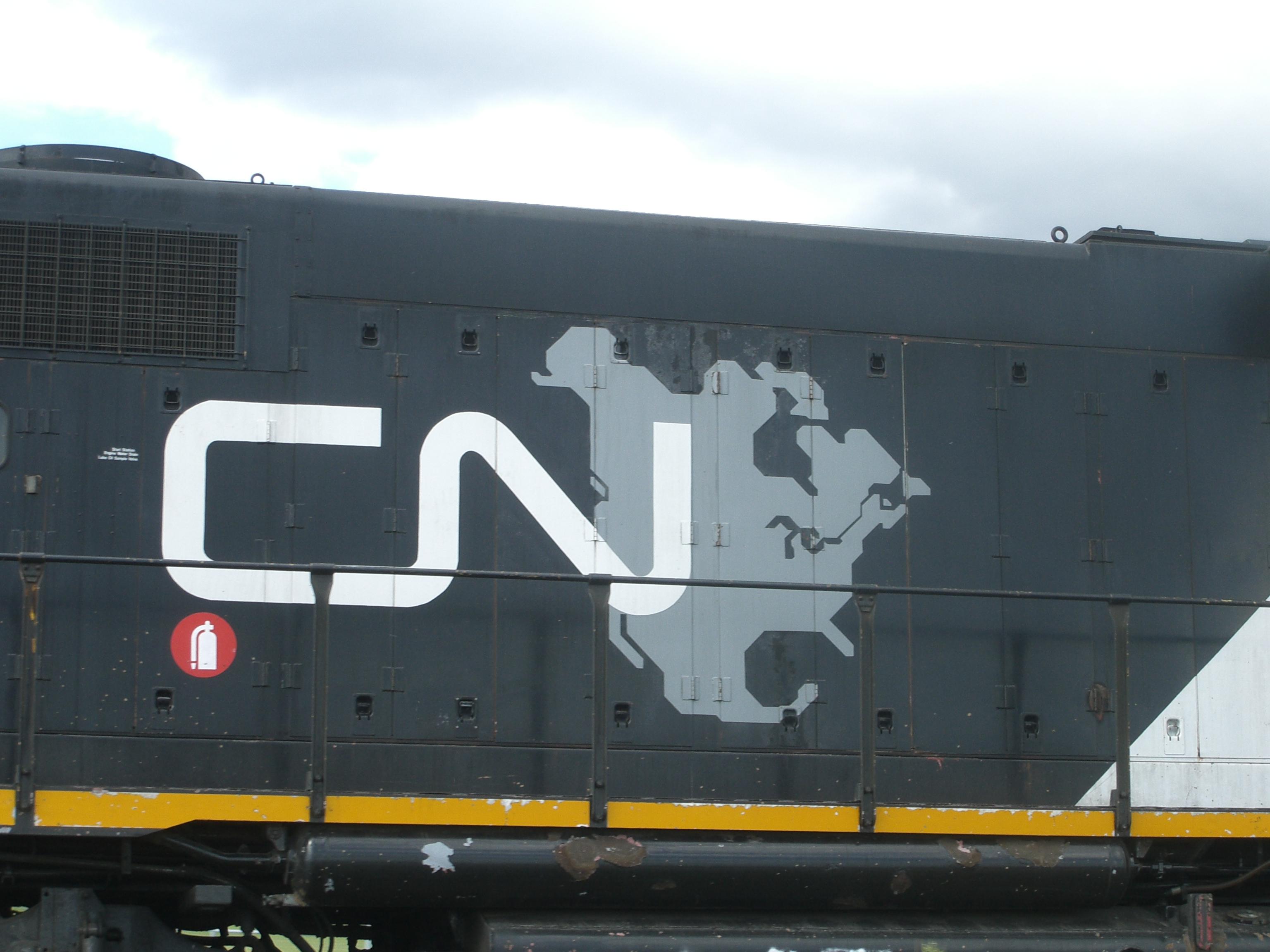
The "CN North America" logo that was used from 1993 to 1995, before the plain "CN" logo was reinstated

- The residents of Wabamun Lake, in Alberta, staged a blockade of CN tracks in August 2005, when they were unsatisfied with the railway's response to a derailment catastrophe that spilled over 700,000 Litres of tarry fuel oil and about 80,000 L of carcinogenic pole treatment oil into the lake. Reporters found pre-spill evidence. CN executives admitted CN failed to provide public safety information to prevent public exposure to carcinogenic, toxic chemicals. The tar-like oil and chemicals killed over 500 large migratory birds, animals, fish and other aquatic life.
- In the years following CN's 1998 acquisition of Illinois Central, the company has come under scrutiny for illicit practices that allegedly cause the delay of Amtrak schedules. In 2012, Amtrak filed a formal complaint against CN with the Surface Transportation Board, stating that the prioritization of freight traffic over passenger traffic was commonplace on Amtrak routes operating on CN lines. The complaint cited over 4,000 delays during fiscal year 2011 on the route between Chicago and Carbondale, totaling over 26 days of net wasted schedule time; it also reported 99 percent of delays between Chicago and New Orleans on the City of New Orleans route were caused by CN dispatching issues. In 2018, Amtrak began issuing public report cards, grading the impact of freight railroads on passenger train performance. CN received the lowest-possible grade of "F" on the first card issued in March 2018.
- In mid-July 2026, a CN train became trapped by a wildfire while waiting for another train to pass near Armstrong, Ontario. CN sent a truck equipped to ride the rails to rescue the trapped train crew. But the rescue truck with its own two-person crew in turn became trapped by the flames. The four CN employees ran on foot until they encountered another truck to pick them up. The men survived but were sent to hospital to check for smoke inhalation. Transport Canada would follow up to determine why CN workers had to flee the wildfire on foot, and whether there were any violations of the Railway Safety Act. The Transportation Safety Board of Canada would also investigate the incident. As a result of this incident, CN closed the rail line, and evacuated all employees in the area.

==== Offences ====
- On June 15, 2017, CN pleaded guilty in the Provincial Court of Alberta to one offence under the Fisheries Act and three offences under the Canadian Environmental Protection Act. It was fined $2.5 million for being non-compliant with a number of requirements under the Storage Tank Systems for Petroleum and Allied Petroleum Products Regulations, which caused an estimated 90 litres of diesel to be released into Edmonton's storm sewer.
- On September 15, 2021, CN pleaded guilty in Prince Rupert Provincial Court to a charge of violating the Fisheries Act and fined $2.5 million for spraying pesticides along its rail line, which runs along the Skeena River and over many tributaries and wetlands in British Columbia, which were found to be deleterious to fish.

== Non-rail subsidiaries ==
=== CN Telegraph ===
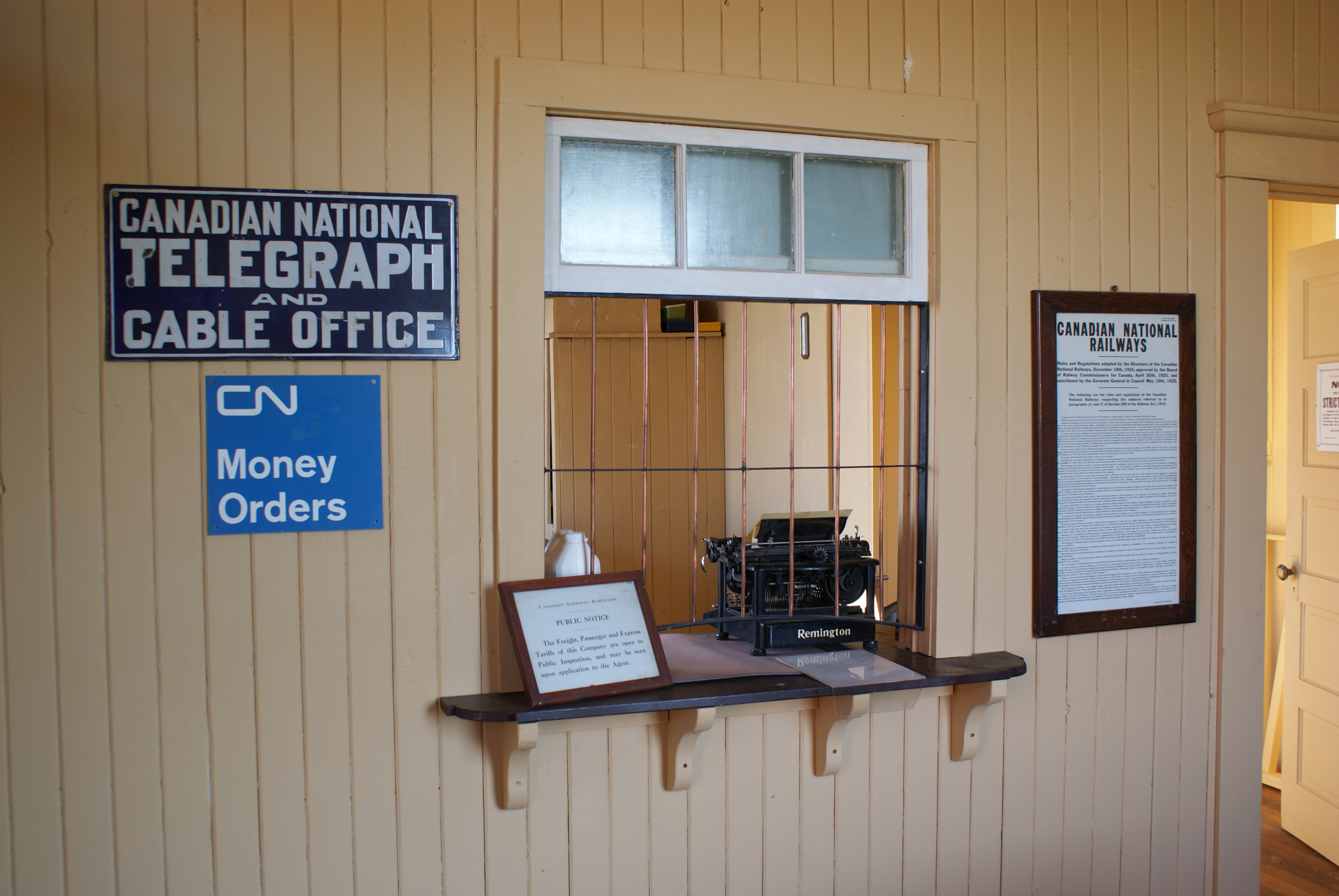
Restored CN Telegraph counter on display at the Saskatchewan Railway Museum

CN Telegraph originated as the Great North West Telegraph Company in 1880 to connect Ontario and Manitoba and became a subsidiary of Western Union in 1881. In 1915, facing bankruptcy, GNWTC was acquired by the Canadian Northern Railway's telegraph company. When Canadian Northern was nationalized in 1918 and amalgamated into Canadian National Railways in 1921, its telegraph arm was renamed the Canadian National Telegraph Company. CN Telegraphs began co-operating with its Canadian Pacific-owned rival CPR Telegraphs in the 1930s, sharing telegraph networks and co-founding a teleprinter system in 1957. In 1967 the two services were amalgamated into a joint venture CNCP Telecommunications which evolved into a telecoms company. CN sold its stake of the company to CP in 1984.

=== Terra Nova Tel ===
Terra Nova Tel was telephone company providing service on Newfoundland from 1949 to 1988.

=== CNR Radio ===
In 1923 CNR's second president, Sir Henry Thornton who succeeded David Blyth Hanna (1919–1922), created the CNR Radio Department to provide passengers with entertainment radio reception and give the railway a competitive advantage over its rival, CP. This led to the creation of a network of CNR radio stations across the country, North America's first radio network. As anyone in the vicinity of a station could hear its broadcasts the network's audience extended far beyond train passengers to the public at large.

Claims of unfair competition from CP as well as pressure on the government to create a public broadcasting system similar to the British Broadcasting Corporation led the government of R. B. Bennett (who had been a corporate lawyer with Canadian Pacific as a client prior to entering politics) to pressure CNR into ending its on-train radio service in 1931 and then withdrawing from the radio business entirely in 1933. CNR's radio assets were sold for $50,000 to a new public broadcaster, the Canadian Radio Broadcasting Commission, which in turn became the Canadian Broadcasting Corporation in 1936.

=== CN Hotels ===
Canadian railways built and operated their own resort hotels, ostensibly to provide rail passengers travelling long distances a place to sleep overnight. These hotels became attractions in and of themselves—a place for a rail passenger to go for a holiday. As each railway company sought to be more attractive than its competitors, they made their hotels more attractive and luxurious. Canadian National Hotels was the CNRs chain of hotels and was a combination of hotels inherited by the CNR when it acquired various railways and structures built by the CNR itself. The chain's principal rival was Canadian Pacific Hotels.

=== Canadian National Steamship Company ===
House flag of Canadian National Steamships

Canadian National operated a fleet of passenger and cargo vessels on both the West Coast and East Coast of Canada which operated under a branch of the company known as Canadian National Steamships, later CN Marine.

==== West Coast ====
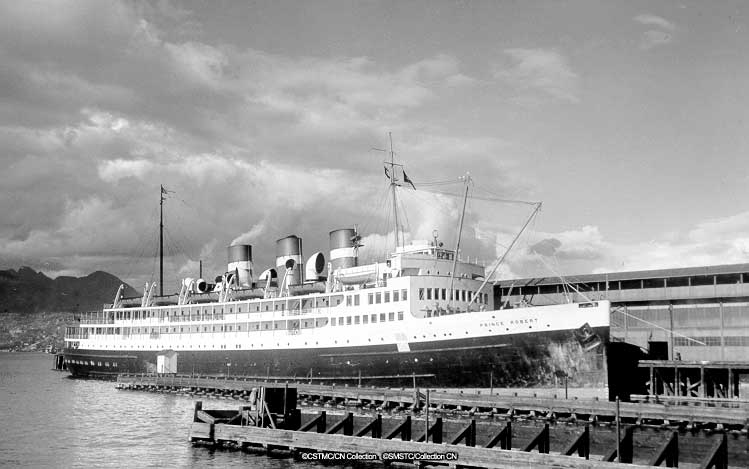
The turbine steamship Prince Robert berthed at Vancouver, BC

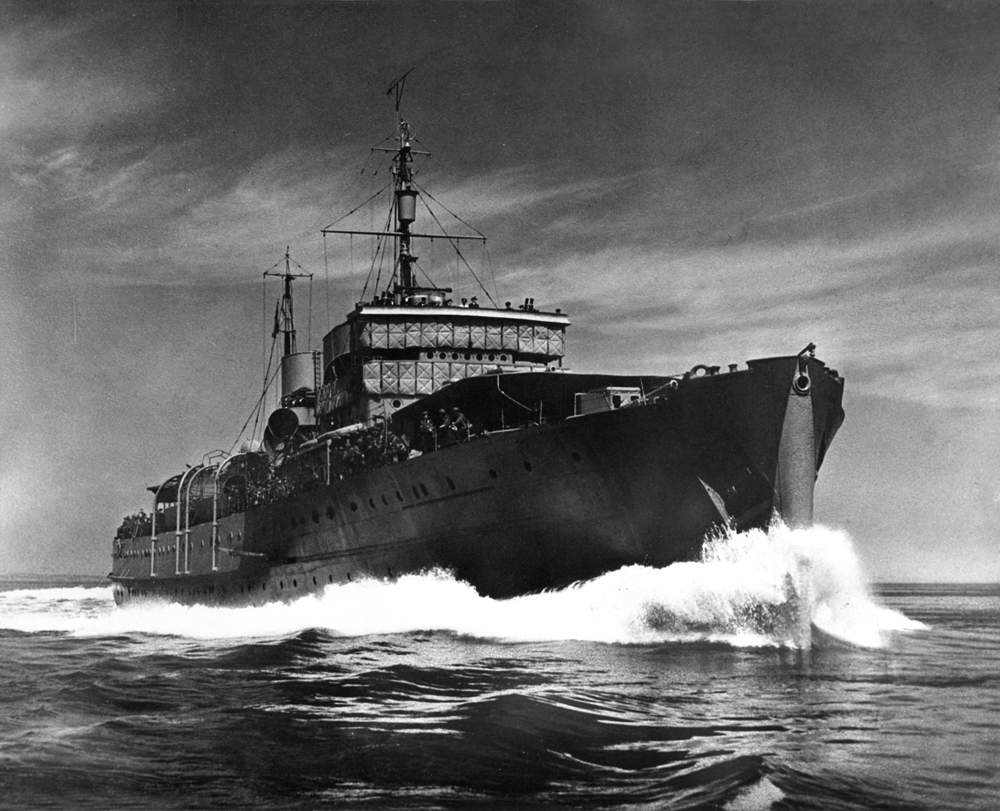
Prince David as an armed merchant cruiser in 1942

Swan Hunter and Wigham Richardson of Wallsend, England, built Prince George and Prince Rupert for the Grand Trunk Pacific Railway in 1910. In 1930 Cammell Laird of Birkenhead, England, built Prince David, Prince Henry and Prince Robert. Prince Henry was sold in 1937. Prince George was destroyed by fire in 1945. Prince David and Prince Robert were requisitioned in 1939 as Royal Canadian Navy armed merchant cruisers, converted into landing ships in 1943, and sold in 1948. In 1948 a second Prince George was built by Yarrows Limited, becoming CN's sole remaining Pacific Coast passenger liner. She was switched from scheduled routes to pleasure cruises, and was the last CN ship that served the west coast. After a fire in 1975 she was sold in 1976 (first to British Columbia Steamship Company and finally Wong Brother Enterprises) before finally being sold to Chinese breakers in 1995 (and sank on her way to China in 1996 in Unimak Pass).

===== Former Canadian Northern Pacific ships =====
- SS Canora was built in 1918 for the Canadian Northern Pacific's Patricia Bay to Port Mann route. In 1919 the ship became part of Canadian National.

===== Former Grand Trunk Pacific steamships =====
These ships served the Pacific coast with GTP until Canadian National took possession of them in 1925:

- Prince Rupert (1910–56)
- Prince George (1910–45) – Caught fire and destroyed in 1945.
- Prince Albert
- Prince John

===== CN-built steamships for the West Coast =====
Ships specially built for CN for the West Coast. After the Second World War steamship service had dropped and by the 1950s the ships were withdrawn. Prince George (II) stayed in service, but to do cruises on the West Coast. By 1975 Prince George (II) was retired, ending CN's steamship era on the West Coast.

- Prince Henry
- Prince David
- Prince Robert
- Prince Charles
- Prince William
- Prince George (II) (1948–1975) – Built and replaced the first Prince George after it caught fire in 1945. Prince George (II) was the last ship that served the west coast for CN.

==== East Coast ====
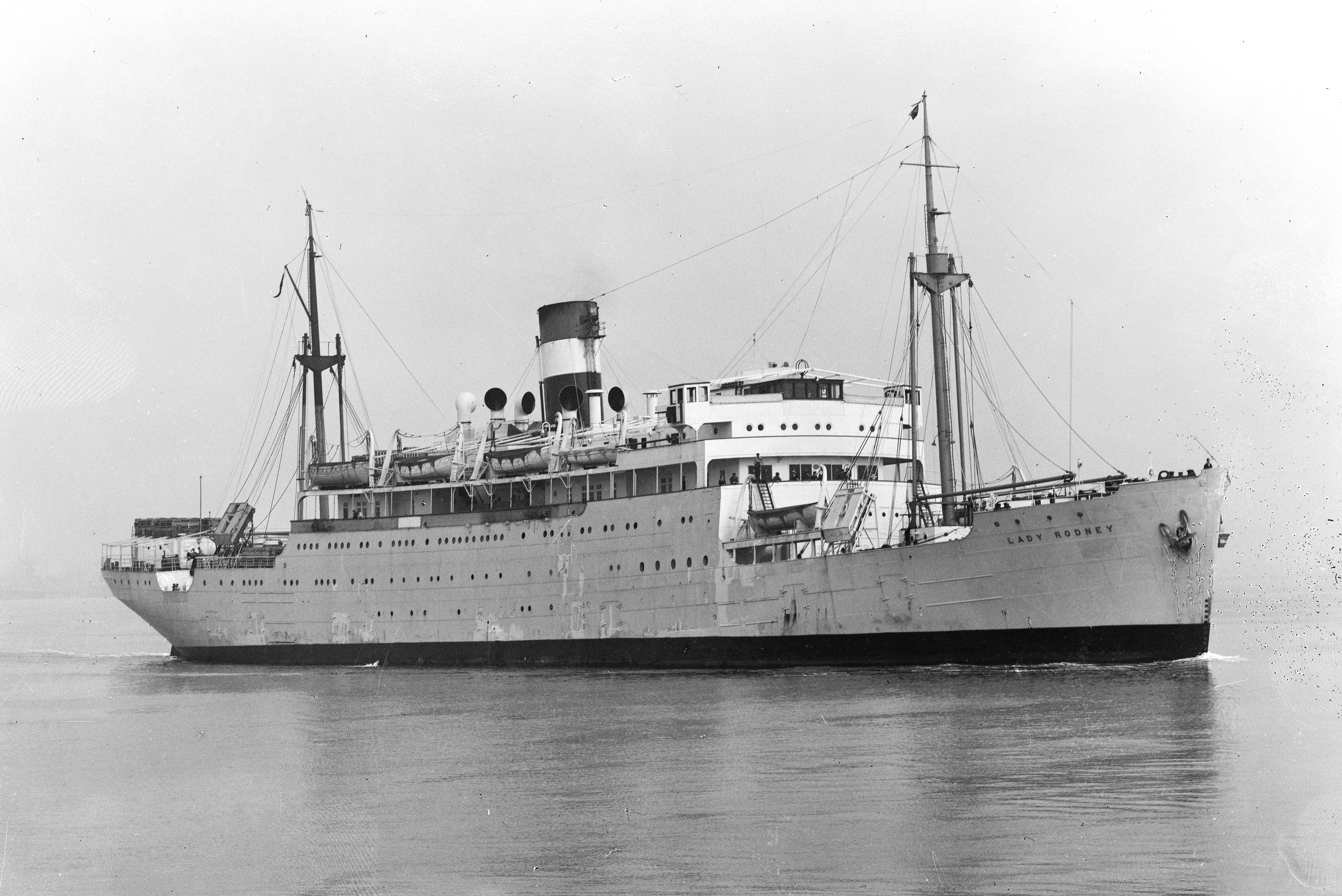
Lady Rodney

In 1928–29 Cammell Laird built a set of five ships for CN to carry mail, passengers and freight between eastern Canada and the Caribbean via Bermuda. Each ship was named after the wife of an English or British admiral who was noted for his actions in the Caribbean, and who had been knighted or ennobled. They were therefore nicknamed the Lady-liners or Lady-boats. Lady Nelson along with Lady Hawkins and Lady Drake were designed for service to the eastern islands of the British West Indies and had larger passenger capacity but lesser cargo capacity than Lady Rodney and Lady Somers who were built for service to western islands. In the Second World War Lady Somers was requisitioned as an ocean boarding vessel while her four sister ships continued in CN service. The Italian submarine Morosini sank Lady Somers in 1941. Lady Hawkins and Lady Drake were sunk by German U-boats in 1942. Lady Nelson was torpedoed in 1942 but refloated and converted to a hospital ship, while Lady Rodney survived the war unscathed. The two surviving Lady Boats, Nelson and Rodney, were sold in 1952 after declining passenger traffic and rising labour costs made them too expensive to run.

==== Cargo ships ====
In 1928 CN took over most of the fleet of Canadian Government Merchant Marine Ltd, giving it a fleet of about 45 cargo ships. When France surrendered to Germany in June 1940 the Canadian Government seized CGT's MV Maurienne and contracted CN to manage her.

=== Aquatrain ===
CN operated a rail barge service between Prince Rupert, British Columbia, to Whittier, Alaska, from 1963 to 2021.

== Corporate governance ==
In May 2022, Shauneen Bruder became the chair of the CNR board. The other board members are Donald J. Carty, V. Maureen Kempston Darkes, Gordon D. Giffin, Edith E. Holiday, Luc Jobin, Denis Losier, Kevin G. Lynch, James E. O'Connor, Robert L. Phillips, and Laura Stein.

=== Heads of the corporation ===
- David B. Hanna 1919–1922 as president
- Sir Henry W. Thornton 1922–1932 as chair and president
- Samuel J. Hungerford 1932–1941 as president and 1936–1942 as chair
- Robert C. Vaughan 1941–1949 as president and 1942–1949 as chair
- Donald Gordon 1950–1966 as chair and president
- Norman J. MacMillan 1967–1974 as chair and president
- Pierre Taschereau 1974–1977 as chair
- Robert A. Bandeen 1974–1982 as president
- Jacques A. Dextrase 1977–1982 as chair
- J. Maurice LeClair 1982–1985 as president and chief executive officer and 1985–1986 as chair and chief executive officer
- Jack H. Horner 1982–1984 as chair
- Bettie Hewes 1984–1985 as chair
- Ronald E. Lawless 1985–1987 as president and 1987–1992 as president and chief executive officer
- Brian O'Neill Gallery 1987–1989 as chair
- Brian R. D. Smith 1989–1994 as chair
- David G. A. McLean 1994–2014 as chair
- Paul M. Tellier 1992–2002 as president and chief executive officer
- E. Hunter Harrison 2003–2009 as president and chief executive officer
- Claude Mongeau 2010–2016 as president and chief executive officer
- Robert Pace 2014–2022 as chair
- Luc Jobin 2016–2018 as president and chief executive officer; stepped down 2018-Mar-05, interim CEO Jean-Jacques Ruest
- Jean-Jacques Ruest as president and chief executive officer July 2018 – February 2022
- Shauneen Bruder 2022– as chair
- Tracy A. Robinson as president and CEO February 28, 2022 –

Thornton and Harrison were the only non-Canadians to head CN.

=== 1900s ===
From 1919 to 1995, CN was also the responsibility of the relevant federal cabinet minister as a Crown Corporation:

- 1919–1936 – Minister of Railways and Canals
- 1936–present – Minister of Transport

=== 2000s ===
Claude Mongeau was president and CEO from 2010 to 2016, previously serving as CFO for almost a decade. His tenure was marked by early praise from leadership for his working on the tracks for several months alongside the company's railroaders. He was also credited with implementing precision railroading.

However, mainline derailments increased in the middle of his tenure, resulting in his bonus being capped. Operating ratio also declined during his time as CEO. He resigned in 2016 after being diagnosed with throat cancer, and the board appointed Luc Jobin to replace him.

During his tenure, Jobin joined the board of British American Tobacco in 2017. In 2018, Jobin resigned "as the railway struggles through operational and customer service challenges," CBC wrote.

== Passenger trains ==
=== Early years ===
When CNR was first created, it inherited a large number of routes from its constituent railways, but eventually pieced its passenger network into one coherent network. For example, on December 3, 1920, CNR inaugurated the Continental Limited, which operated over four of its predecessors, as well as the Temiskaming and Northern Ontario Railway. The 1920s saw growth in passenger travel, and CNR inaugurated several new routes and introduced new services, such as radio, on its trains. However, the growth in passenger travel ended with the Great Depression, which lasted between 1929 and 1939, but picked up somewhat in World War II. By the end of World War II, many of CNR's passenger cars were old and worn down. Accidents at Dugald, Manitoba, in 1947 and Canoe River, British Columbia, in 1950, wherein extra passenger trains composed of older, wooden equipment collided with transcontinental passenger trains composed of newer, all-steel equipment, demonstrated the dangers inherent in the older cars. In 1953, CNR ordered 359 lightweight passenger cars, allowing them to re-equip their major routes.

On April 24, 1955, the same day that the CPR introduced its transcontinental train The Canadian, CNR introduced its own new transcontinental passenger train, the Super Continental, which used new streamlined rolling stock. However, the Super Continental was never considered as glamorous as the Canadian. For example, it did not include dome cars. Dome cars would be added in the early 1960s with the purchase of six former Milwaukee Road "Super Domes". They were used on the Super Continental in the summer tourist season.

=== New services ===
Rail passenger traffic in Canada declined significantly between World War II and 1960 due to automobiles and airplanes. In the 1960s CN's privately owned rival CPR reduced its passenger services significantly. However, the government-owned CN continued much of its passenger services and marketed new schemes. One, introduced on April 5, 1962, was the "Red, White and Blue" fare structure, which offered deep discounts on off-peak days ("red") and were credited with increasing passenger numbers on some routes as much as 600%. Another exercise was the rebranding of the express trains in the Ontario–Quebec corridor with the Rapido label.

In 1968, CN introduced a new high-speed train, the United Aircraft Turbo, which was powered by gas turbines instead of diesel engines. It made the trip between Toronto and Montreal in four hours, but was not entirely successful because it was somewhat uneconomical and not always reliable. The trainsets were retired in 1982 and later scrapped at Metrecy, in Laval, Quebec.

On CN's narrow gauge lines in Newfoundland, CN also operated a main line passenger train that ran from St. John's to Port aux Basques called the Caribou. Nicknamed the Newfie Bullett, this train ran until June 1969. It was replaced by the CN Roadcruiser Buses. The CN Roadcruiser service was started in fall 1968 and was run in direct competition with the company's own passenger train. Travellers saw that the buses could travel between St. John's and Port aux Basques in 14 hours versus the train's 22 hours. After the demise of the Caribou, the only passenger train service run by CN on the island were the mixed (freight and passenger) trains that ran on the Bonavista, Carbonear and Argentia branch lines. The only passenger service surviving on the main line was between Bishop's Falls and Corner Brook.

In 1976, CN created an entity called Via-CN as a separate operating unit for its passenger services. Via evolved into a coordinated marketing effort with CP Rail for rail passenger services, and later into a separate Crown corporation responsible for inter-city passenger services in Canada. Via Rail took over CN's passenger services on April 1, 1978.

=== Decline ===
CN continued to fund its commuter rail services in Montreal until 1982, when the Montreal Urban Community Transit Commission (MUCTC) assumed financial responsibility for them; operation was contracted out to CN, which eventually spun off a separate subsidiary, Montrain, for this purpose. When the Montreal–Deux-Montagnes line was completely rebuilt in 1994–1995, the new rolling stock came under the ownership of the MUCTC, until a separate government agency, the Agence métropolitaine de transport (now AMT), was set up to consolidate all suburban transit administration around Montreal. Since then, suburban service has resumed to Saint-Hilaire, and a new line to Mascouche opened in December 2014.

In Newfoundland, Terra Transport would continue to operate the mixed trains on the branch lines until 1984. The main line run between Corner Brook and Bishop's Falls made its last run on September 30, 1988. Terra Transport/CN would run the Roadcruiser bus service until March 29, 1996, whereupon the bus service was sold off to DRL Coachlines of Triton, Newfoundland.

=== Expansion and service cuts ===
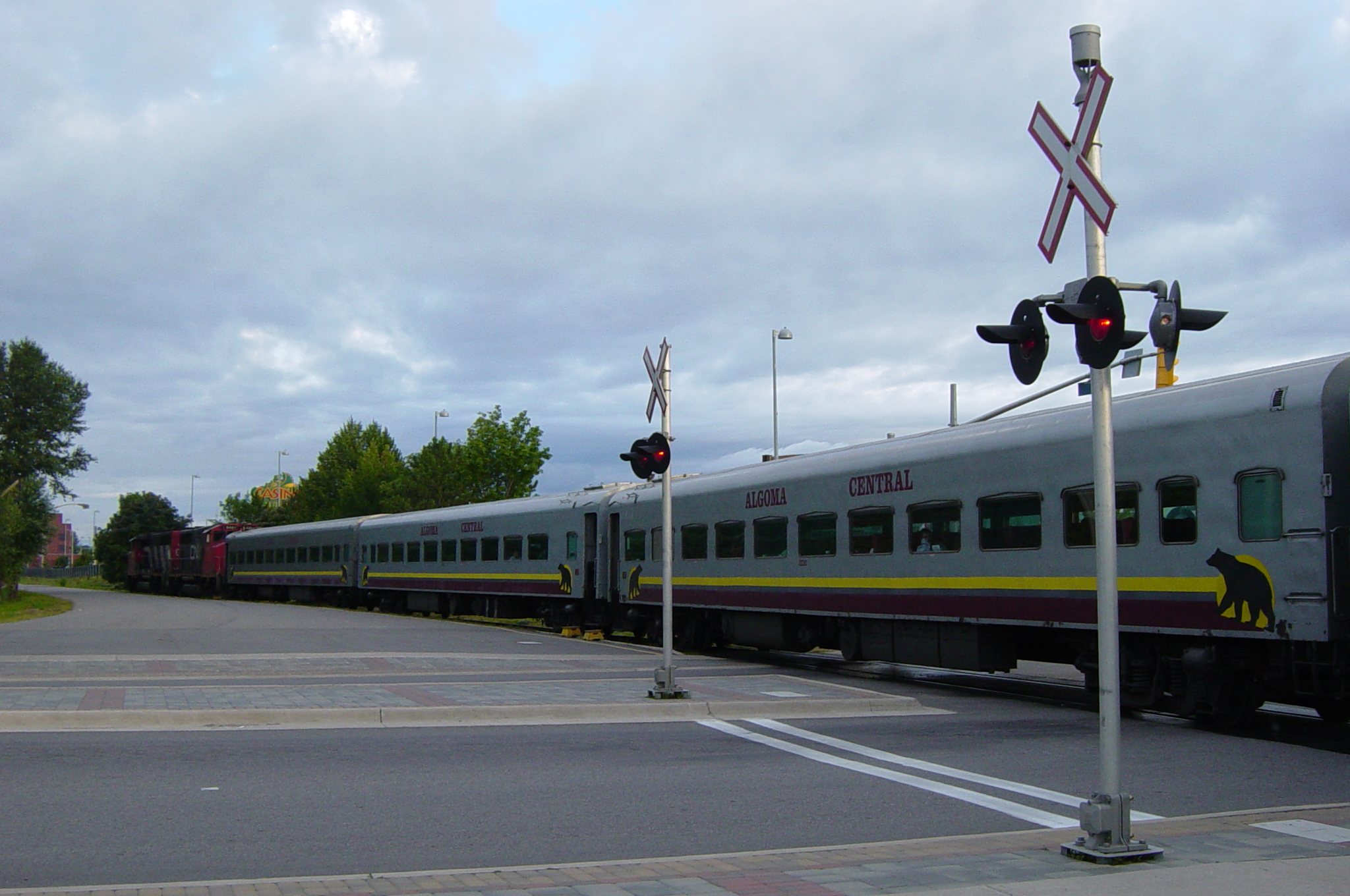
CN operates the Agawa Canyon Tour excursion.

From the acquisition of the Algoma Central Railway in 2001 until service cancellation in July 2015, CN operated passenger service between Sault Ste. Marie and Hearst, Ontario. The passenger service operated three days per week and provided year-round access to remote tourist camps and resorts.

In January 2014, CN announced it was cutting the service, blaming the Government of Canada for cutting a subsidy necessary to keep the service running. It was argued as an essential service; however, the service had always been deemed financially uneconomic, and despite an extension of funding in April 2014, Algoma Central service was suspended as of July 2015.

CN operates the Agawa Canyon Tour excursion, an excursion that runs from Sault Ste. Marie, Ontario, north to the Agawa Canyon. The canyon tour train consists of up to 28 passenger cars and 2 dining cars, the majority of which were built for CN by Canadian Car and Foundry in 1953–54. These cars were transferred to the D&RGW Ski Train and bought back by CN in 2009.

After CN acquired BC Rail in 2004, it started operating a railbus service between Seton Portage and Lillooet, British Columbia called the Kaoham Shuttle.

CN crews used to operate commuter trains on behalf of GO Transit in the Toronto and the surrounding vicinity. This changed in 2008 when a deal was reached with Bombardier Transportation that switched all CN crews for Bombardier crews.

== Locomotives ==
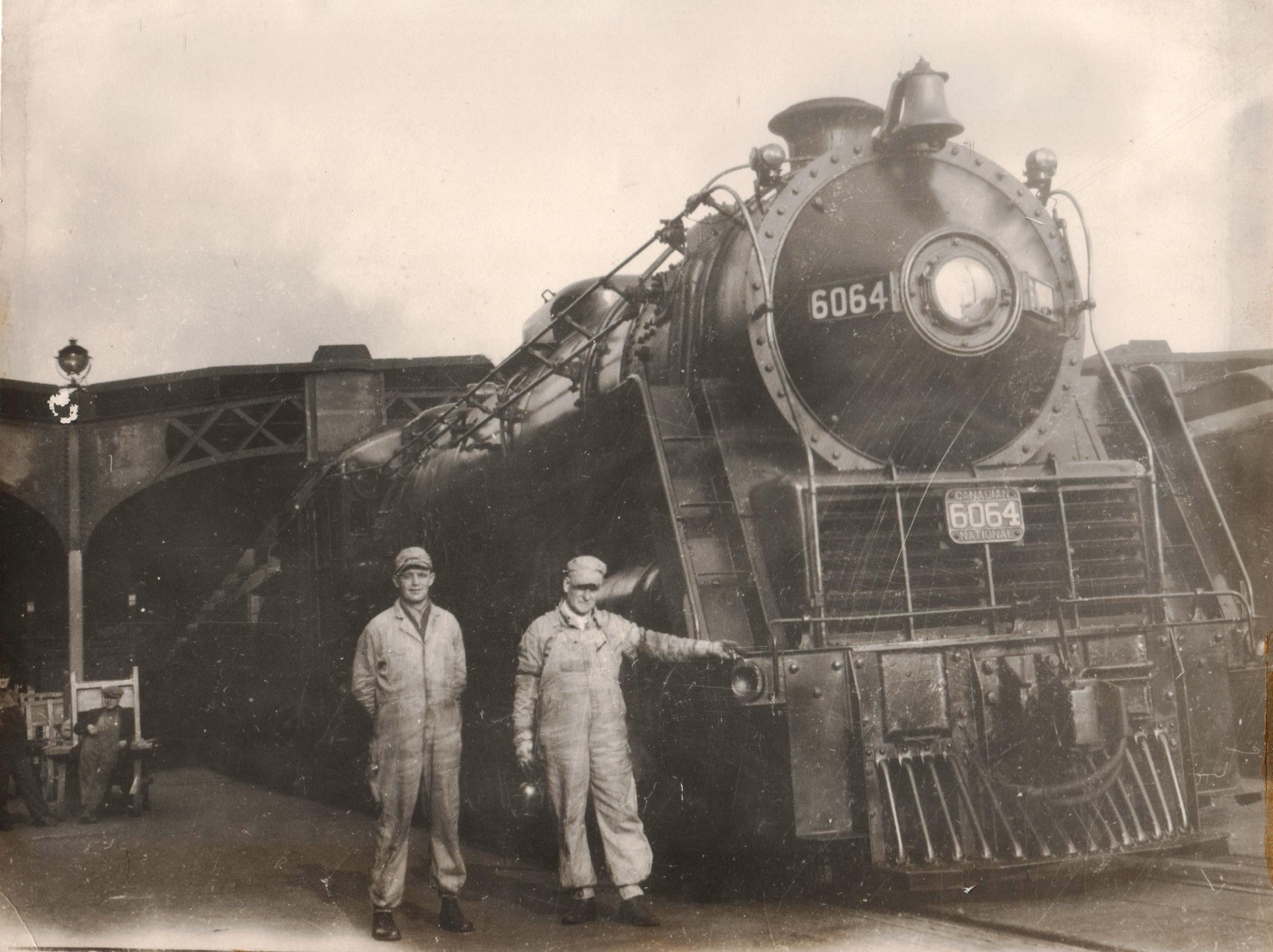
CN coal fired steam engine 6064 with engineer Carl Bruner (right) and colleague

=== Steam ===
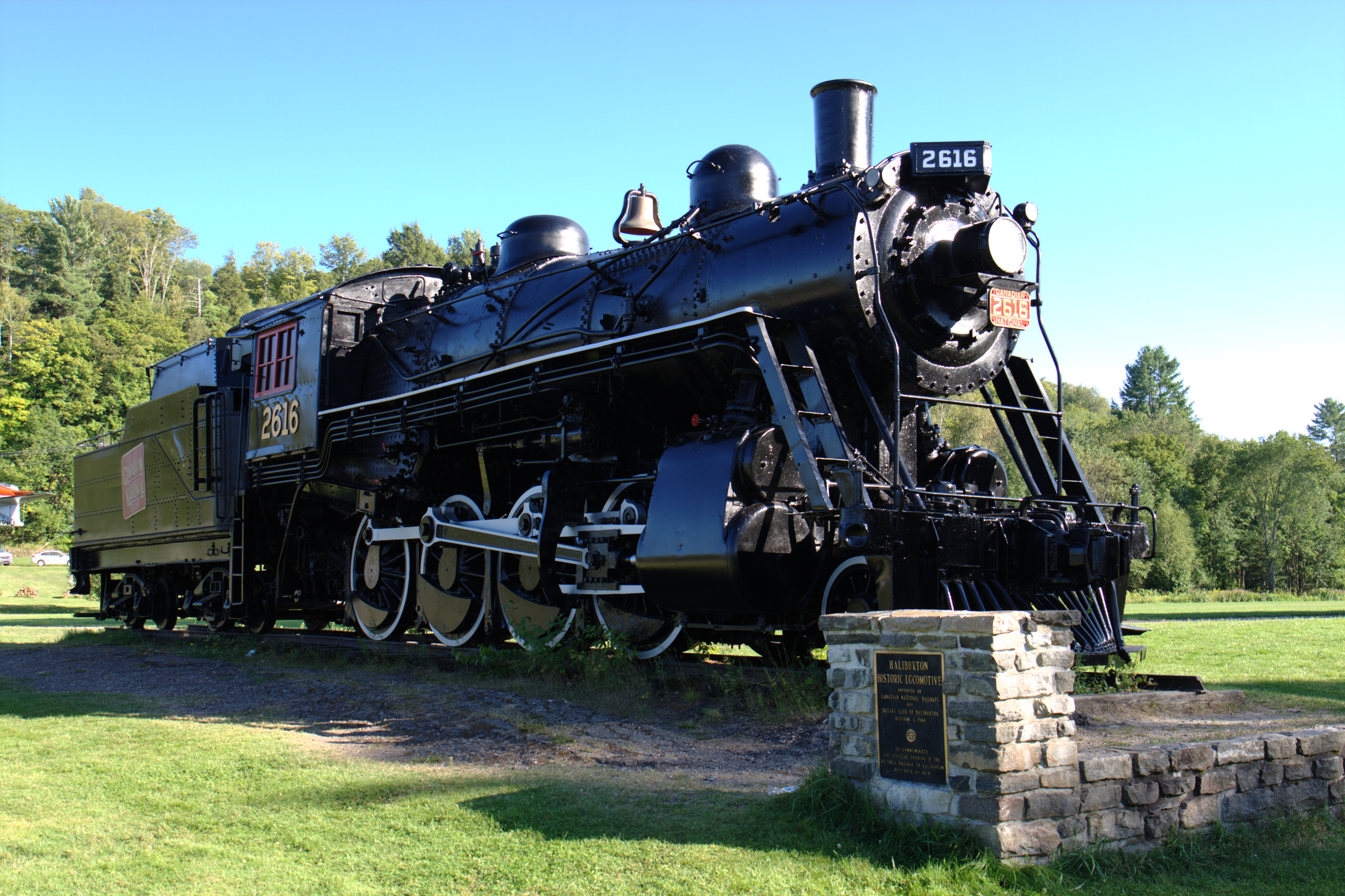
CN steam locomotive at Head Lake, Haliburton, Ontario

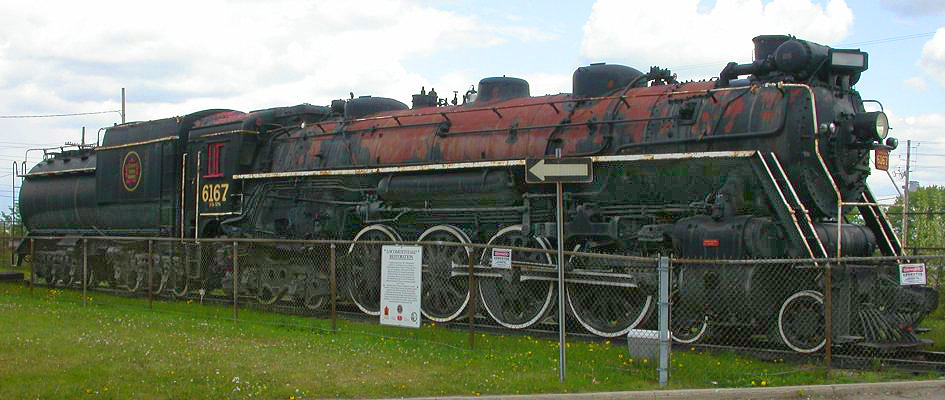
CN 6167 at Guelph, Ontario

The CNR acquired its first 4-8-4 Confederation locomotives in 1927. Over the next 20 years, it ordered over 200 for passenger and heavy freight service. The CNR also used several 4-8-2 Mountain locomotives, almost exclusively for passenger service. No. 6060, a streamlined 4-8-2, was the last CN steam locomotive, running in excursion service in the 1970s. CNR also used several 2-8-2 Mikado locomotives.

=== Electric ===
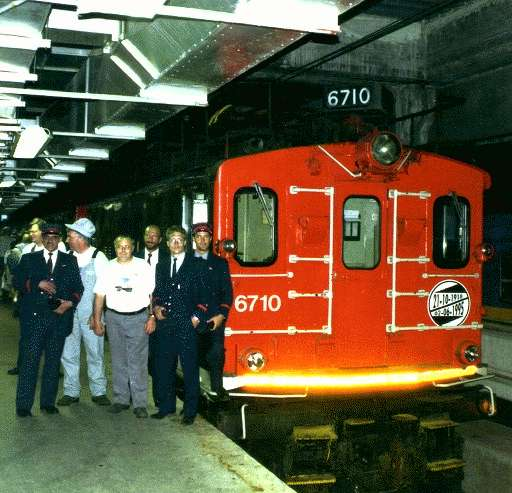
First and last CN electric locomotive, 1918–1995

CN inherited from the Canadian Northern Railway several boxcab electrics used through the Mount Royal Tunnel. Those were built between 1914 and 1918 by General Electric in Schenectady, New York. To operate the new Montreal Central Station, which opened in 1943 and was to be kept free of locomotive smoke, they were supplemented by nearly identical locomotives from the National Harbours Board; those engines were built in 1924 by Beyer, Peacock & Company and English Electric. In 1950, three General Electric centre-cab electric locomotives were added to the fleet. In 1952 CN added electric multiple units built by Canadian Car and Foundry.

Electrification was restricted to Montreal, and went from Central Station to Saint-Lambert (south), Turcot (west), Montréal-Nord (east) and Saint-Eustache-sur-le-lac, later renamed Deux-Montagnes, (north). But as steam locomotives gave way to diesels, engine changeovers were no longer necessary, and catenary was eventually pulled from the west, east and from the south. However, until the end of the original electrification, CN's electric locomotives pulled Via Rail's trains, including its diesel electric locomotives, to and from Central Station.

The last 2,400 V DC CN electric locomotive ran on June 6, 1995, the very same locomotive that pulled the inaugural train through the Mount Royal Tunnel back in 1918. Later in 1995 the AMT's Electric Multiple Units began operating under 25 kV AC 60 Hz electrification, and in 2014, dual-power locomotives entered service on the Mascouche line.

=== Turbo ===
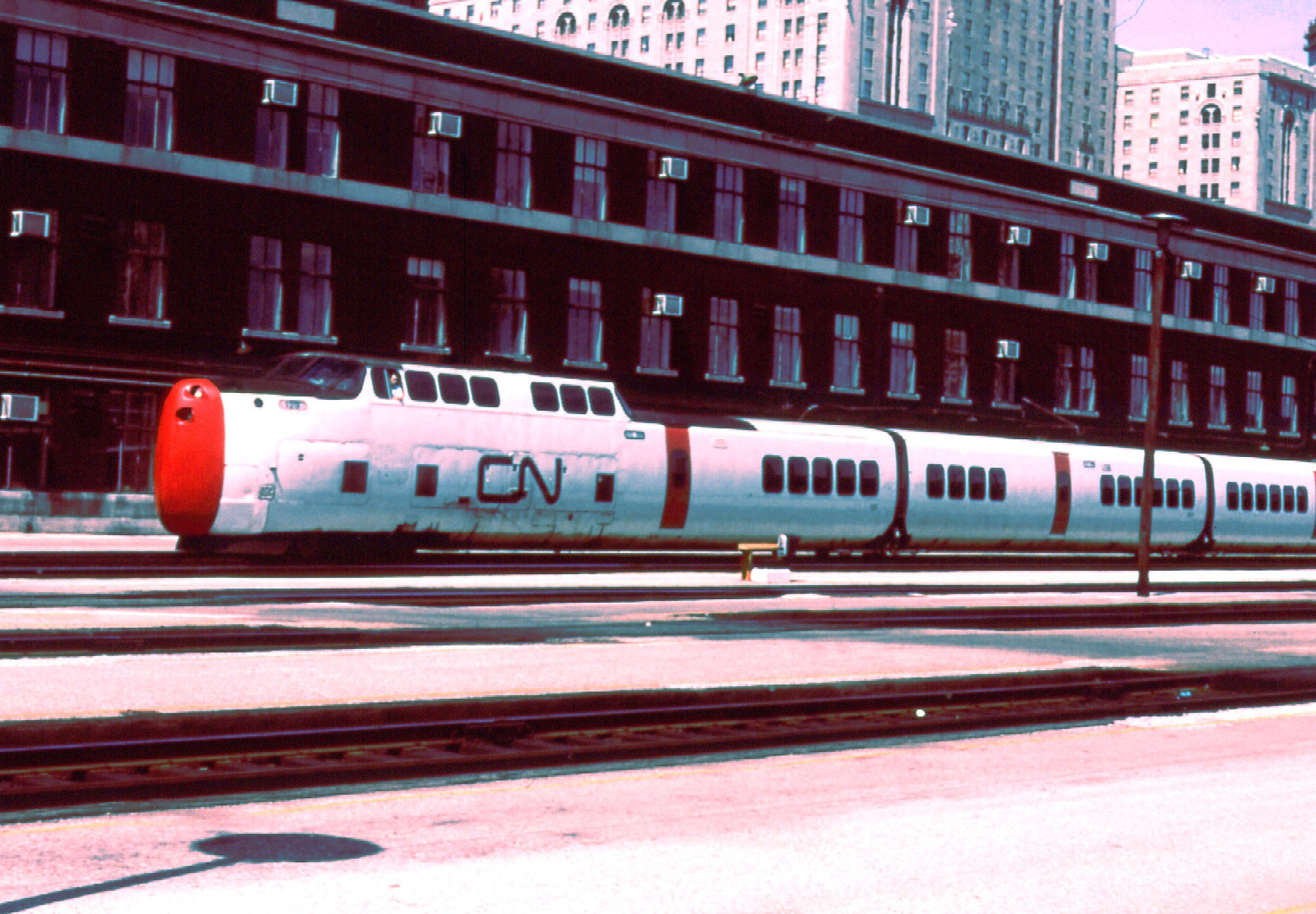
CN TurboTrain in Toronto

In May 1966, CN ordered five seven-car UAC TurboTrain for the Montreal–Toronto service. It planned to operate them in tandem, connecting two trains together into a larger fourteen-car arrangement with a total capacity of 644 passengers. The Canadian trains were built by Montreal Locomotive Works, with their ST6 engines supplied by UAC's Canadian division (now Pratt & Whitney Canada) in Longueuil, Quebec.

CN and their ad agency wanted to promote the new service as an entirely new form of transit, so they dropped the "train" from the name. In CN's marketing literature the train was referred to simply as the "Turbo", although it retained the full TurboTrain name in CN's own documentation and communication with UAC. A goal of CN's marketing campaign was to get the train into service for Expo '67, and the Turbo was rushed through its trials. It was late for Expo, a disappointment to all involved, but the hectic pace did not let up and it was cleared for service after only one year of testing.

The Turbo's first demonstration run in December 1968 with Conductor James Abbey of Toronto in command, included a large press contingent. An hour into its debut run, the Turbo collided with a truck at a highway crossing near Kingston.

The Turbo's final run was on October 31, 1982.

=== Diesel ===
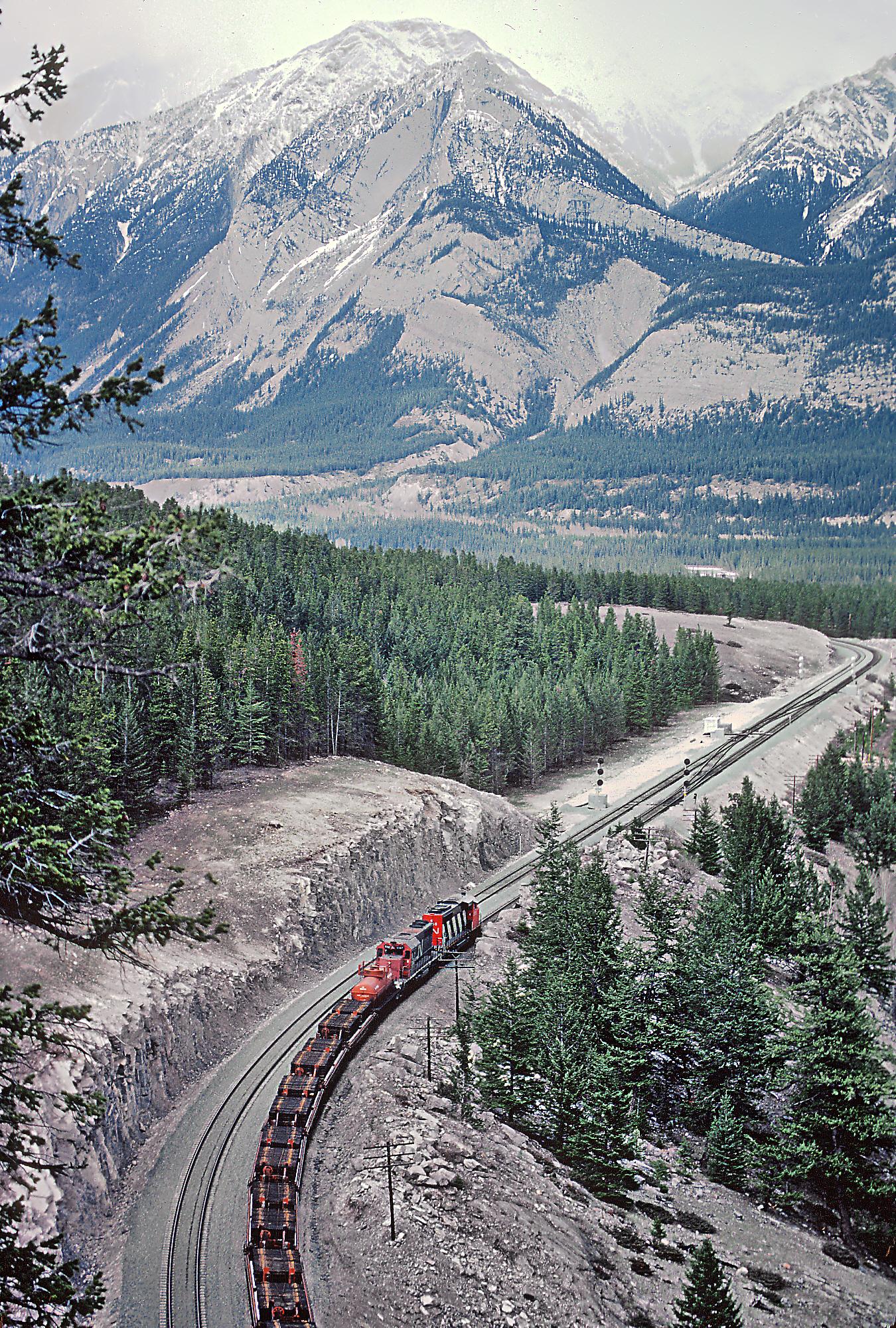
A CN freight train led by a diesel locomotive at the crossovers at English, which is east of Jasper, Alberta

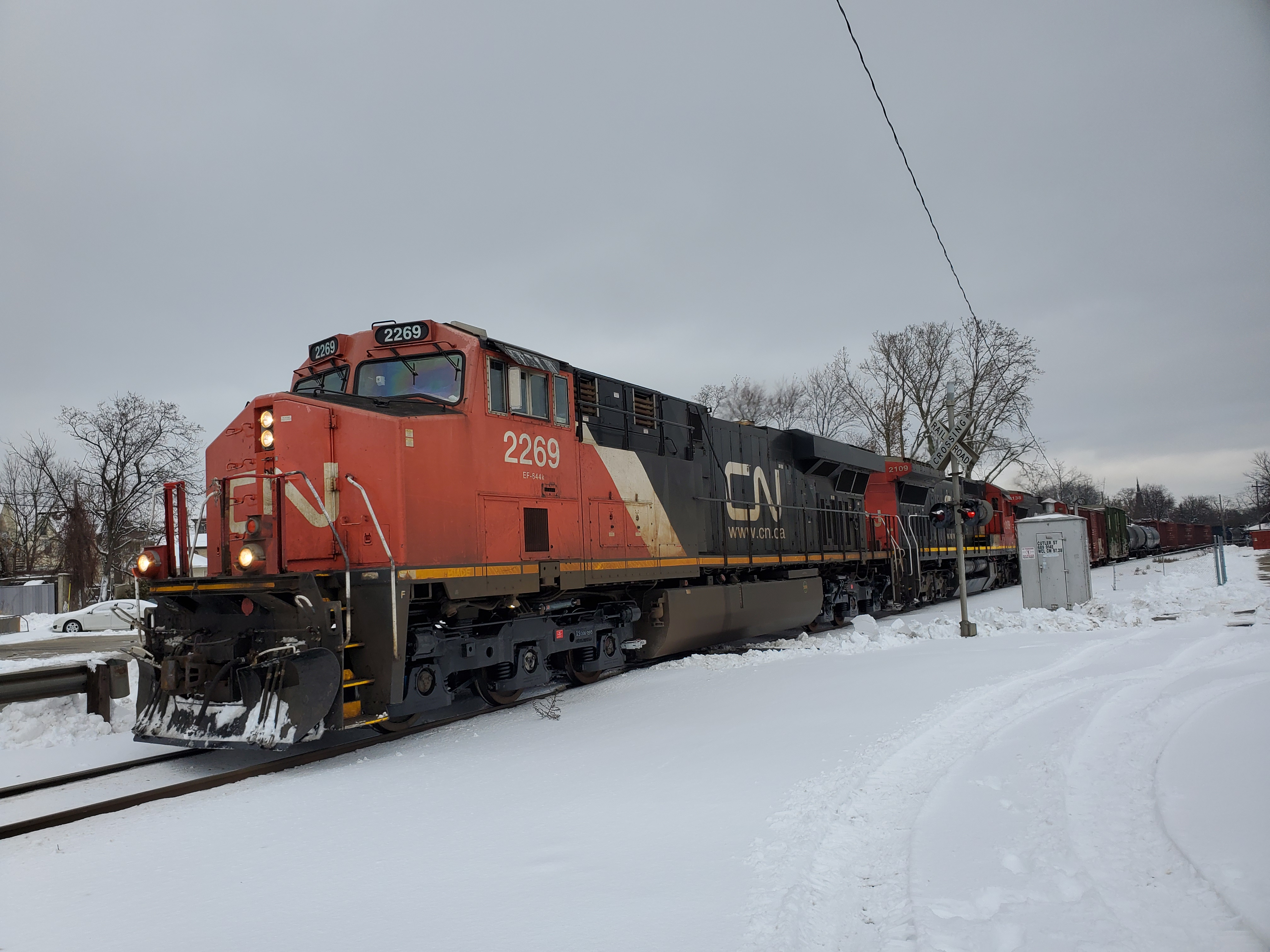
CN 2269, a GE ES44DC, in Waukesha, Wisconsin

CNR's first foray into diesel motive power was with self-propelled railcars. In November 1925, Railcar No. 15820 completed a 72-hour journey from Montreal to Vancouver with the 185-horsepower (138 kW) diesel engine in nearly continuous operation for the entire 4,726-kilometre (2,937 mi) trip. Railcars were used on marginal economic routes instead of the more-expensive-to-operate steam locomotives used for busier routes.

In 1929, the CNR made its first experiment with mainline diesel electric locomotives, acquiring two 1,330-horsepower (990 kW) engines from Westinghouse, numbered 9000 and 9001. It was the first North American railway to use diesels in mainline service. These early units proved the feasibility of the diesel concept, but were not always reliable. No. 9000 served until 1939, and No. 9001 until 1947. The difficulties of the Great Depression precluded much further progress towards diesel locomotives. The CNR began its conversion to diesel locomotives after World War II, and had fully dieselized by 1960. Most of the CNR's first-generation diesel locomotives were made by General Motors Diesel (GMD) and Montreal Locomotive Works.

For its narrow-gauge lines in Newfoundland CN acquired from GMD the 900 series, Models NF110 (road numbers 900–908) and NF210 (road numbers 909–946). For use on the branch lines, CN purchased the EMD G8 (road numbers 800–805).

For passenger service the CNR acquired GMD FP9 diesels, as well as CLC CPA16-5, ALCO MLW FPA-2 and FPA-4 diesels. These locomotives made up most of the CNR's passenger fleet, although CN also owned some 60 RailLiners (Budd Rail Diesel Cars), some dual-purpose diesel freight locomotives (freight locomotives equipped with passenger train apparatus, such as steam generators) as well as the locomotives for the Turbo trainsets. Via acquired most of CN's passenger fleet when it took over CN passenger service in 1978.

The CN fleet as of 2007 consists of 1,548 locomotives, most of which are products of either General Motors' Electro-Motive Division (EMD), or General Electric/GE Transportation Systems. Some locomotives more than 30 years old remain in service.

Much of the current roster is made up of EMD SD70I and EMD SD75I locomotives and GE C44-9W locomotives. Recently acquired are the new EMD SD70M-2 and GE ES44DC. Since 2015 the GE ES44AC & GE ET44AC are the latest units.

Beginning in the early summer months of 2010, CN purchased a small order of GE C40-8's and GE C40-8W's from Union Pacific and BNSF Railway, respectively. The intent was to use them as a cheaper power alternative. CN currently has 65 GE ES44ACs on its roster and all 65 were ordered and delivered from December 2012 to December 2013. They are CN's first AC-powered locomotives. In 2015, CN started ordering more GE units, the ET44AC.

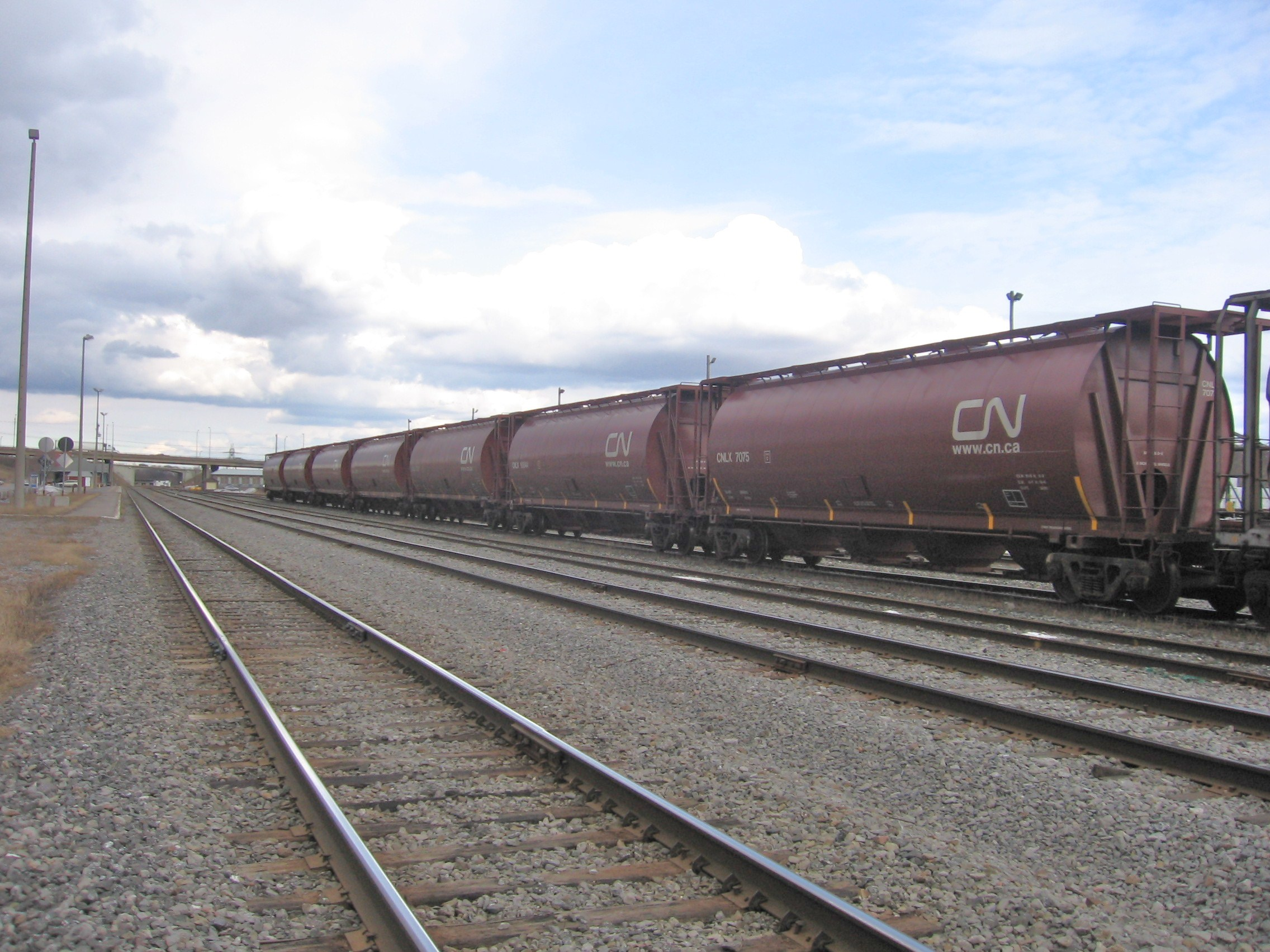
Hoppers in Sainte-Foy, Quebec City, April 2012

On November 17, 2020, CN revealed five heritage units to mark the 25th anniversary of becoming a publicly traded company. They had originally been spotted a month earlier, but were not yet formally announced by the company. The locomotives were repainted into various schemes of railroads CN had previously acquired, and included four GE ET44ACs painted in IC, EJ&E, WC, and BC Rail paint, and an EMD SD70M-2 painted in GTW paint.

== Major facilities ==
CN owns a large number of large yards and repair shops across their system. They are used for many operations, ranging from intermodal terminals to classification yards. Examples include:

=== Hump yards ===
Hump yards work by using a small hill over which cars are pushed before being released down a slope and switched automatically into cuts of cars, ready to join into outbound trains. CN's active humps include:

- Vaughan, Ontario: MacMillan Yard
- Winnipeg, Manitoba: Symington Yard
- Gary, Indiana: Kirk Yard
- Memphis, Tennessee: Harrison Yard

=== Other major yards ===
- Battle Creek, Michigan: Battle Creek Yard
- Calgary, Alberta: Sarcee Yard
- Champaign, Illinois: Champaign Yard
- Dartmouth, Nova Scotia: Dartmouth Yard
- Edmonton, Alberta: Walker Yard (formerly Calder Yard) – Also home to CN's North American Operations Facility and rail traffic control
- Flat Rock, Michigan: Flat Rock Yard
- Flint, Michigan: Flint Yard
- Fond du Lac, Wisconsin: Shops Yard
- Homewood, Illinois: Markham Yard
- Lévis, Quebec: Joffre Yard
- Moncton, New Brunswick: Gordon Yard
- Montreal, Quebec: Taschereau Yard
- New Orleans, Louisiana: Mays Yard
- Port Huron, Michigan: Port Huron Yard
- Halifax, Nova Scotia: Pace Yard (formerly Rockingham yard)
- Sarnia, Ontario: Sarnia Yard
- Saskatoon, Saskatchewan: Chappell Yard
- Surrey, British Columbia: Thornton Yard
- Toledo, Ohio: Lang Yard
- Windsor, Ontario: Van de Water Yard
- Winnipeg, Manitoba: Transcona Shops, Symington Yard

=== Intermodal terminals ===
- Calgary, Alberta
- Chicago, Illinois
- Chippewa Falls, Wisconsin
- Detroit, Michigan (Ferndale)
- Duluth, Minnesota
- Edmonton, Alberta
- Halifax, Nova Scotia
- Gulfport, Mississippi
- Jackson, Mississippi: terminal owned by the Kansas City Southern Railway
- Memphis, Tennessee
- Mobile, Alabama
- Moncton, New Brunswick
- Montreal, Quebec
- New Orleans, Louisiana
- Prince George, British Columbia
- Prince Rupert, British Columbia
- Saskatoon, Saskatchewan
- Regina, Saskatchewan
- Brampton, Ontario
- Surrey, British Columbia
- Winnipeg, Manitoba

== See also ==
- Canadian Pacific Kansas City – Canadian railroad holding company
- GO Transit – Regional public transit system in Ontario
- Narrow gauge railways in Canada
- Newfoundland T'Railway – Recreational trail in Canada
- Ontario Northland Railway – Railway in Northern Ontario, Canada
- Rail transport in Canada
