= Tracy A. Robinson =

Canadian businesswoman

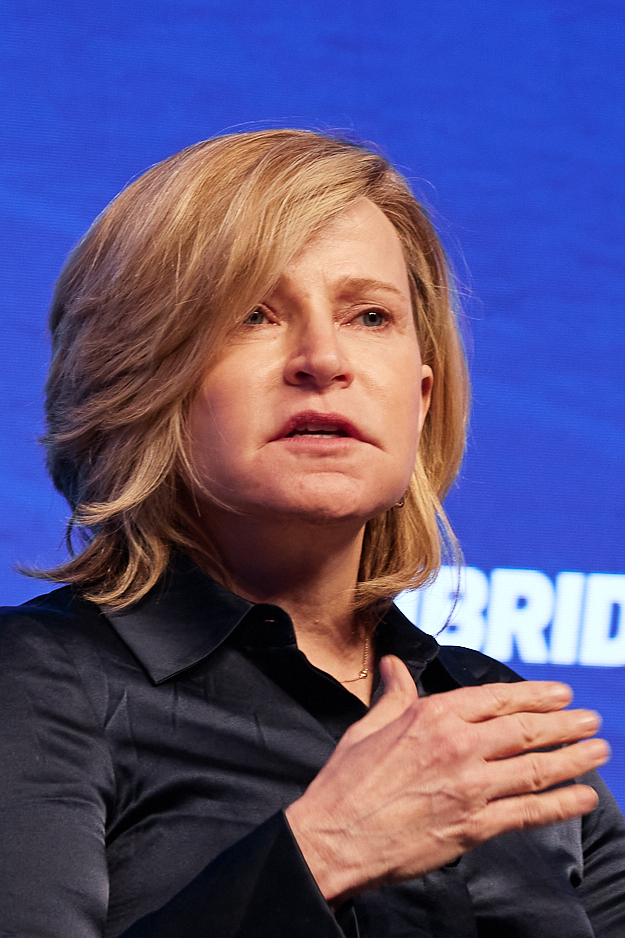
- Citizenship: Canadian
- Education: University of Saskatchewan (Bachelor of Communication); Wharton School of the University of Pennsylvania (MBA)
- Occupation: Business executive
- Employer: Canadian National Railway
- Known for: First woman to serve as Chief Executive Officer of Canadian National Railway
- Title: President and Chief Executive Officer
- Term: February 28, 2022–present
- Predecessor: Jean-Jacques Ruest
- Board member of: Canadian National Railway

Tracy A. Robinson is the president and chief executive officer of the Canadian National Railway. She was elevated to the position in January 2022. She formally took her position as CEO on February 28, 2022, becoming the first female CEO of a Canadian railway. She previously had been an energy executive and had been an official at Canadian Pacific Railway.

== Early life and education ==
Robinson earned a bachelors of communication at the University of Saskatchewan and a masters of business administration at the University of Pennsylvania's Wharton School of Business.

== Career ==
Robinson had worked for 27 years at Canadian Pacific including holding the position of vice president of marketing and sales and vice president/treasurer. In the interim between her years at Canadian Pacific and her joining Canadian National she started holding executive positions at TC Energy in 2014. Her positions included executive vice president and she was president of TC Energy's Transcanada natural gas pipelines. In her work at Transcanada, she was responsible for all commercial, business development, project, regulatory and operating functions for the Canada Gas business unit. This included work on the largest system for handling natural gas in the Western Canadian Sedimentary Basin and the Canadian mainline pipeline delivering Canadian gas to the United States.

In her ascending to the CEO position, Robinson succeeded Jean-Jacques 'J.J.' Ruest.

She was ranked 80th on Fortune's list of Most Powerful Women in 2023.

== Board and council memberships ==
Robinson is member of the Dean's Advisory council at the Edwards School of Business at the University of Saskatchewan. Additionally, she has served on boards with organizations such as Smart Sand, Inc., the Canadian Energy Pipeline Association’s (CEPA) Executive Business Environment Standing Committee, the Ontario Energy Association, and the Iroquois Gas Transmission System.
