= Robert Charles Vaughan (railway executive) =

Robert Charles Vaughan, CMG (1 December 1883 – 5 January 1966) was a Canadian railway executive. He was president of Canadian National Railway from 1941 to 1950. During the Second World War, Vaughan was chairman of the Defence Purchasing Board.

Born and educated in Toronto, Vaughan joined the Canadian Pacific Railway as a messenger boy in 1898, aged 15. Four years later, he joined the Grand Trunk Railway.
