= Deaths in September 1996 =

The following is a list of notable deaths in September 1996.

Entries for each day are listed alphabetically by surname. A typical entry lists information in the following sequence:

- Name, age, country of citizenship at birth, subsequent country of citizenship (if applicable), reason for notability, cause of death (if known), and reference.

== September 1996 ==
=== 1 ===
- Jimmy Duncanson, 76, Scottish football player.
- Vagn Holmboe, 86, Danish composer and teacher.
- Andrew Hughes, 88, Turkish-Japanese film actor and business executive.
- Karl Kehrle, 98, German-British Benedictine monk and bee breeding authority.
- Dick Logan, 90, Australian rules footballer.
- Arnold Mettler, 91, Swiss Olympic equestrian (1936).
- Ion Oblemenco, 51, Romanian football striker, heart attack.
- Nyi Pu, 95, Burmese actor and film director.
- Hugo Scheltema, 78, Dutch diplomat and ambassador.
- Wally Spencer, 72, Australian rules footballer.
- Ljuba Welitsch, 83, Bulgarian singer.

=== 2 ===
- André Chastagnol, 76, French historian.
- Paddy Clift, 43, Zimbabwean cricketer, bone marrow cancer.
- Karl Frenzel, 85, German Nazi war criminal.
- Georgi Georgiev-Getz, 69, Bulgarian film and stage actor, stroke.
- Charles Kirbo, 79, American lawyer and longtime advisor to Jimmy Carter.
- Wes Livengood, 86, American baseball player (Cincinnati Reds), scout and manager.
- Otto Luening, 96, German-American composer and conductor.
- Aleksandr Markin, 46, Soviet football player, accident.
- Aldo Montano, 85, Italian Olympic fencer (1936, 1948).

=== 3 ===
- Veniamin Basner, 71, Soviet/Russian composer.
- Robert Brown, 75, English politician.
- Walter Forster, 79, Brazilian actor, heart attack.
- Philip Kedward, 87, English cricketer.
- Emily Kngwarreye, 86, Aboriginal Australian artist from Utopia, Northern Territory.
- Valeri Kravchenko, 57, Soviet/Russian Olympic volleyball player (1968, 1972).
- Julian Amery, Baron Amery of Lustleigh, 77, British politician.
- Og Mandino, 72, American author.
- Alba Roballo, 88, Uruguayan lawyer, poet, and politician.
- Hugh Torney, 42, Irish National Liberation Army paramilitary leader, shot.
- Edward Turkington, 97, American Olympic rugby union player (1924).

=== 4 ===
- Victor Aaron, 39, American actor (Geronimo: An American Legend, King of the Hill, Sunchaser), traffic collision.
- Joan Clarke, 79, English cryptanalyst and numismatist.
- Babe Dahlgren, 84, American baseball player.
- Ilus W. Davis, 79, American mayor.
- Jeanne Juilla, 86, French model and actress.
- Bill MacPhail, 76, American television executive.
- Julio Musimessi, 72, Argentine football player.
- Wee Willie Smith, 86, American football player (New York Giants).

=== 5 ===
- Leonard Katzman, 69, American film and television producer, writer and director, heart attack.
- Anthony Mendleson, 81, British costume designer.
- Anselm Strauss, 79, American medical sociologist.
- Clem Thomas, 67, Welsh rugby player.
- John White, 71, Canadian politician.
- Misa Yamamura, 62, Japanese novelist and a mystery writer, heart failure.

=== 6 ===
- Ginette Martenot, 94, French musician.
- Barney McCosky, 79, American Major League Baseball player.
- Darío Espina Pérez, 75, Cuban banker, lawyer, and writer.
- Salman Shah, 24, Bangladeshi actor, suicide.
- Daniel Shanks, 79, American mathematician.
- Ester Soré, 81, Chilean singer, Diabetic coma.
- Michael Torrence, 35, American serial killer, execution by lethal injection.
- Douglas Franklin Wright, 56, American serial killer, execution by lethal injection.

=== 7 ===
- Bibi Besch, 54, Austrian-American actress (Star Trek II: The Wrath of Khan, Steel Magnolias, Tremors), breast cancer.
- Joseph Biroc, 93, American cinematographer (The Towering Inferno, It's a Wonderful Life, Airplane!), Oscar winner (1975).
- Arda Bowser, 97, American gridiron football player.
- Niccolò Castiglioni, 64, Italian musician.
- Bruno Corbucci, 64, Italian film director.
- Teddy Falda, 76, American basketball player.
- Arthur Sherwood Flemming, 91, American government official, renal failure.
- Elvio Flores, 62, Argentine Olympic equestrian (1964).
- Keith Forbes, 90, Australian rules football player.
- Gilda, 34, Argentine singer, traffic collision.
- Einar Kristjánsson, 62, Icelandic Olympic alpine skier (1956).
- Ernie Martin, 93, Australian rules footballer.
- Willy Miranda, 70, Cuban-American baseball player.
- Vyacheslav Solovyov, 71, Soviet/Russian football player and coach.

=== 8 ===
- Semyon Aranovich, 62, Soviet/Russian film director, cancer.
- Richard Bishop, 86, American Olympic gymnast (1932).
- Eyre de Lanux, 102, American artist, writer, and art deco designer.
- Onib Olmedo, 59, Filipino painter.
- Jacques Schmidt, 63, French costume designer.

=== 9 ===
- Raúl Calvo, 79, Argentine Olympic basketball player (1948).
- Harry Hanebrink, 68, American baseball player (Milwaukee Braves, Philadelphia Phillies), aneurysm.
- Shiva Nath Katju, 86, Indian lawyer, judge and an Indian National Congress politician.
- Charles Kenny, 67, English cricketer.
- Ruggero Mastroianni, 66, Italian film editor, heart attack.
- Bill Monroe, 84, American "father of bluegrass" music, stroke.
- Robert Nisbet, 82, American sociologist.
- Johnny Pramesa, 71, American baseball player (Cincinnati Reds, Chicago Cubs).
- John W. Tuthill, 85, American diplomat.

=== 10 ===
- Latifa al-Zayyat, 73, Egyptian activist and writer, cancer.
- Ray Coleman, 59, British journalist and writer.
- Joanne Dru, 74, American actress, edema.
- Plantagenet Somerset Fry, 65, British historian and author, suicide.
- Charlie Gainor, 79, American football player (Chicago Cardinals).
- Hans List, 100, Austrian automotive pioneer.
- Julia Morton, 84, American author and botanist.
- Stig Norén, 88, Swedish general and commander of the air force.
- Sapphire, 61, American professional wrestler and manager, heart attack.
- Pete Stout, 73, American National Football League player (Washington Redskins).

=== 11 ===
- Guido Aristarco, 77, Italian film critic and author.
- Dante Bertoli, 83, Italian Olympic wrestler (1936).
- Bráz, 75, Brazilian basketball player and Olympian (1948, 1952).
- Bill Chivell, 63, South African Olympic sprinter (1952).
- Klára Fehér, 74, Hungarian writer.
- Louise Fitch, 81, American actress.
- Brenda Forbes, 87, British-American actress, cancer.
- Dan Mahoney, 87, Australian politician.
- Deane Waldo Malott, 98, American academic and administrator.
- Thomas J. O'Connor, 71, American politician.
- Koichi Oita, 82, Japanese football player, manager, and Olympian (1936), heart failure.

=== 12 ===
- Nikolay Avkhimovich, 89, Soviet and Belarusian politician.
- Frank Christie, 69, Scottish football player and manager.
- Eleazar de Carvalho, 84, Brazilian conductor and composer.
- Ernesto Geisel, 89, Brazilian general and former president of Brazil, cancer.
- Robin Hanley, 28, English cricketer.
- Ricardo López, 21, Uruguayan-American stalker of musician Björk, suicide by gunshot.
- James Scott-Elliot, 93, British Army officer.

=== 13 ===
- Marvin Allen, 81, American soccer coach.
- Jane Baxter, 87, British actress, stomach cancer.
- James F. Bonner, 86, American molecular biologist.
- Jan Brooijmans, 66, Dutch footballer.
- César Mendoza Durán, 78, Chilean police officer, Olympic equestrian (1952), and member of the Government Junta, pancreatic cancer.
- Tupac Shakur, 25, American rapper ("California Love", "Dear Mama") and actor (Poetic Justice), shot.
- Marion Shirley, 74, American football player (New York Yankees).
- Wang Shoudao, 90, Chinese politician.
- Xosé Filgueira Valverde, 89, Spanish writer, intellectual, and researcher.
- William Ayres Ward, 68, American Egyptologist.
- Leni Wylliams, 35, American dancer, choreographer, and teacher, murdered.

=== 14 ===
- Helen Cohan, 86, American stage dancer and film actress.
- Jock Cordner, 86, Australian rules football player.
- Edred John Henry Corner, 90, English botanist and a mycologist.
- Douglas Everett, 91, American ice hockey player and Olympian (1932).
- Joe E. Martin, 80, American boxing coach.
- Rose Ouellette, 93, Quebec actress, comedian, and theatre manager.
- Juliet Prowse, 59, dancer and actress, pancreatic cancer.

=== 15 ===
- Phil Farbman, 72, American basketball player (Philadelphia Warriors, Boston Celtics).
- Joe Maniaci, 82, American football player (Brooklyn Dodgers, Chicago Bears), and coach.
- Agnes Mongan, 91, American art historian.
- Erling Nielsen, 61, Danish football player.
- Tom Payne, 81, Brazilian film director, screenwriter and actor.
- Andy Pilney, 83, American gridiron football player and coach, baseball player (Boston Bees).
- Ottis Toole, 49, American drifter and serial killer, cirrhosis.
- Georgios Vafopoulos, 93, Greek poet, author, and journalist.

=== 16 ===
- Selwyn Baker, 85, Australian rules footballer.
- McGeorge Bundy, 77, American academic, heart attack.
- Karl Dröse, 82, German Olympic field hockey player (1936).
- Rolf Graae, 79, Danish architect and organ designer.
- Gene Nelson, 76, American actor, dancer, screenwriter, and director, cancer.
- Joan Perry, 85, American film actress, model, and singer, emphysema.

=== 17 ===
- Spiro Agnew, 77, American politician, 39th Vice President of the United States, leukemia.
- Marianne Bachmeier, 46, German vigilante, pancreatic cancer.
- Billy Bowers, 74, American baseball player (Chicago White Sox).
- Irving Ben Cooper, 94, American district judge (United States District Court for the Southern District of New York).
- Teodoro Fernández, 83, Peruvian footballer and Olympian (1936).
- Jessie Hill, 63, American R&B and Louisiana blues singer and songwriter, heart and renal failure.
- Douglas Hogarth, 69, Canadian politician, member of the House of Commons of Canada (1968-1972).
- Paul J. Krebs, 84, American labor union official and politician, member of the United States House of Representatives (1965-1967).
- Arnold Peters, 74, Canadian politician, member of the House of Commons of Canada (1957-1980).
- Henk Schijvenaar, 78, Dutch Olympic footballer (1948).

=== 18 ===
- Annabella, 89, French cinema actress, heart attack.
- Ulrich Beiger, 78, German actor.
- Luciano Cozzi, 87, Italian Olympic diver (1928).
- Corrie Laddé, 80, Dutch Olympic swimmer (1932).
- Ronald McNicoll, 90, Australian Army general.
- Kalevi Mononen, 76, Finnish Olympic cross-country skier (1952).
- Raymond Lee Stewart, 44, American spree killer, execution by lethal injection.
- Bai Yang, 76, Chinese actress.

=== 19 ===
- Noureddine Aba, 75, Algerian poet and playwright.
- Nanny Fernandez, 77, American baseball player (Boston Braves, Pittsburgh Pirates).
- Helmut Heißenbüttel, 75, German novelist and poet, pneumonia.
- George Hunt, 86, English footballer, Alzheimer's disease.
- Douglas Hyde, 85, English political journalist and writer.
- Irene Mann, 67, German dancer, actress and choreographer.
- Dudley Mattingly, 68, Australian rules footballer.
- Ștefan Mihăilescu-Brăila, 71, Romanian actor, Alzheimer's disease.
- Czesław Petelski, 73, Polish film director and screenwriter.
- Lloyd Rice, 68, Canadian Olympic canoeist (1956).
- Hiawatha Shelby, 74, American baseball player.
- Edilberto K. Tiempo, 83, Filipino professor, writer.

=== 20 ===
- Franco Angrisano, 70, Italian actor, heart attack.
- Murtaza Bhutto, 42, Pakistani politician and militant leader.
- S. F. Brownrigg, 58, American film director and producer.
- Paul Draper, 86, American tap dancer and choreographer, pulmonary emphysema.
- Paul Erdős, 83, Hungarian mathematician, heart attack.
- Krešo Golik, 74, Croatian film and television director and screenwriter.
- Reuben Kamanga, 67, Zambian politician.
- Max Manus, 81, Norwegian resistance fighter during World War II.
- Alan Muir, 74, Australian rules footballer.
- Dagdu Maruti Pawar, 61, Indian writer.
- Ted Platt, 75, English football player.
- Jože Vadnov, 84, Slovenian Olympic gymnast (1936).
- William S. Vaughn, 92, American businessman and philanthropist.
- Paul Weston, 84, American pianist, arranger, composer, and conductor.

=== 21 ===
- Juan Adarraga, 72, Spanish Olympic middle-distance runner (1948).
- Erika Cremer, 96, German chemist.
- Paolo De Poli, 91, Italian enameller and painter.
- Lamar Dodd, 87, American artist.
- Claus Holm, 78, German film actor.
- Leo Isacson, 86, American attorney and politician, cancer.
- Vern Lamprell, 85, Australian rules footballer.
- Henri Nouwen, 64, Dutch Catholic priest, writer and theologian, heart attack.
- Franz Pfnür, 87, German alpine skier, Olympic champion (1936), and SS officer during World War II.
- Ashoke Kumar Sen, 82, Indian lawyer and politician.
- Julius Silverman, 90, British politician.
- Sabine Zlatin, 89, Polish-French Resistance member during World War II.

=== 22 ===
- Mohamed Ben Ahmed Abdelghani, 69, Algerian politician and prime Minister.
- Brook Bernacchi, 74, British lawyer and politician in Hong Kong, brain cancer.
- Ludmilla Chiriaeff, 72, Soviet-Canadian ballet dancer and choreographer.
- Dorothy Lamour, 81, American actress (Road to ...) and singer, heart attack.
- József Sir, 84, Hungarian athlete and Olympian (1936).
- Svetislav Valjarević, 85, Yugoslav football player.
- Marko Valok, 69, Serbian football player.
- Joanne Winter, 71, American baseball player and golfer.

=== 23 ===
- Bimal Kumar Bachhawat, 71, Indian neurochemist and glycobiologist.
- Joe Borowski, 62, Canadian politician and activist.
- Fujiko F. Fujio, 62, Japanese manga cartoonist, liver disease.
- Károly Kárpáti, 90, Hungarian Olympic wrestling champion (1928, 1932, 1936).
- Jack Newman, 94, New Zealand cricket player and business executive.
- Diarmuid O'Neill, 27, Northern Irish volunteer in the Provisional Irish Republican Army (IRA), killed.
- Stuart Piggott, 86, British archaeologist, heart attack.
- František Rauch, 86, Czech music educator and pianist.
- Silk Smitha, 35, Indian actress and dancer, suicide by hanging.

=== 24 ===
- I. E. S. Edwards, 87, British egyptologist and curator.
- Red Embree, 79, American Major League Baseball pitcher (Cleveland Indians, New York Yankees, St. Louis Browns).
- Mark Frankel, 34, British actor, traffic accident.
- Bert Hargrave, 79, Canadian politician, member of the House of Commons of Canada (1972-1984).
- Zeki Müren, 64, Turkish singer, composer, songwriter, actor and poet, heart attack.
- Mário Palmério, 80, Brazilian writer.
- Pavel Sudoplatov, 89, Soviet lieutenant general and spy.
- Jannes van der Wal, 39, Dutch draughts player, leukemia.

=== 25 ===
- Dick Kennedy, 71, Australian rules footballer.
- Red Mihalik, 80, Polish-American basketball player and referee.
- Richard Holt Locke, 55, American actor in gay erotic films and AIDS educator and activist, complications of AIDS.
- Helgi Skúlason, 63, Icelandic actor and stage director.
- George Veneroso, 87, American football coach.

=== 26 ===
- Nicu Ceaușescu, 45, Romanian politician, son of Nicolae Ceaușescu and Elena Ceaușescu, liver cirrhosis.
- Bob Davidson, 84, Canadian ice hockey player (Toronto Maple Leafs).
- Heinz Engelmann, 85, German actor.
- Alicja Iwańska, 78, Polish sociologist, academic and writer, lung cancer.
- Jozef Marko, 73, Slovak football player and coach.
- Lucia Valerio, 91, Italian tennis player.
- Geoffrey Wilkinson, 75, British chemist and Nobel Prize laureate.

=== 27 ===
- Hermine Baron, 83, American contract bridge.
- James Franklin Battin, 71, American politician and United States federal judge.
- Pinetta Colonna-Gamero, 91, Italian painter.
- Jila Hosseini, 32, Iranian poet, writer, researcher and radio announcer, car accident.
- Bruce Konopka, 77, American baseball player (Philadelphia Athletics).
- Johnny Larntvet, 79, Norwegian Olympic ice hockey player (1952).
- Garland Lawing, 78, American baseball player (Cincinnati Reds, New York Giants).
- Mohammad Najibullah, 49, Afghan politician and President of Afghanistan, execution by hanging.
- Ahmad Muhammad Numan, 87, Yemeni educator, propagandist and politician.
- Lee Tit, 83, Cantonese film director.

=== 28 ===
- Giuseppe Bartolomei, 73, Italian politician.
- Menato Boffa, 66, Italian racecar driver.
- Marcos Aurelio Di Paulo, 76, Argentinian football player.
- Bob Gibson, 64, American folk singer and musician, progressive supranuclear palsy.
- Alois Gottfried, 94, Austrian Olympic fencer (1924).
- August Maus, 81, German Navy officer and World War II submarine commander.
- Andrei Suraikin, 47, Russian figure skater and Olympian (1972).
- Maurice Valency, 93, American writer and playwright.

=== 29 ===
- Claire Bonenfant, 71, Canadian politician and feminist.
- Alfred Christensen, 82, Danish canoeist and Olympian (1948).
- Leslie Crowther, 63, English comedian, actor, TV presenter, and game show host, heart failure.
- Shusaku Endo, 73, Japanese author, complications of hepatitis.
- Bohuslav Karlík, 87, Czechoslovak canoeist and Olympian (1936, 1952).
- Li Qiang, 91, Chinese revolutionary, secret agent, and politician, liver cancer.
- George Rung, 80, American basketball coach.

=== 30 ===
- Charlie Adam, 77, Scottish football player.
- Aubrey Brabazon, 76, Irish horse racing jockey.
- Kenneth Muir, 89, English literary scholar and author.
- Pavel Parák, 83, Czech Olympic rower (1936).
- P. Jay Sidney, 81, American actor.
- Moneta Sleet, Jr., 70, American journalist, cancer.
- Sylvester William Treinen, 78, American Roman catholic bishop.
