= Domenica (Greek band) =

Greek rock band

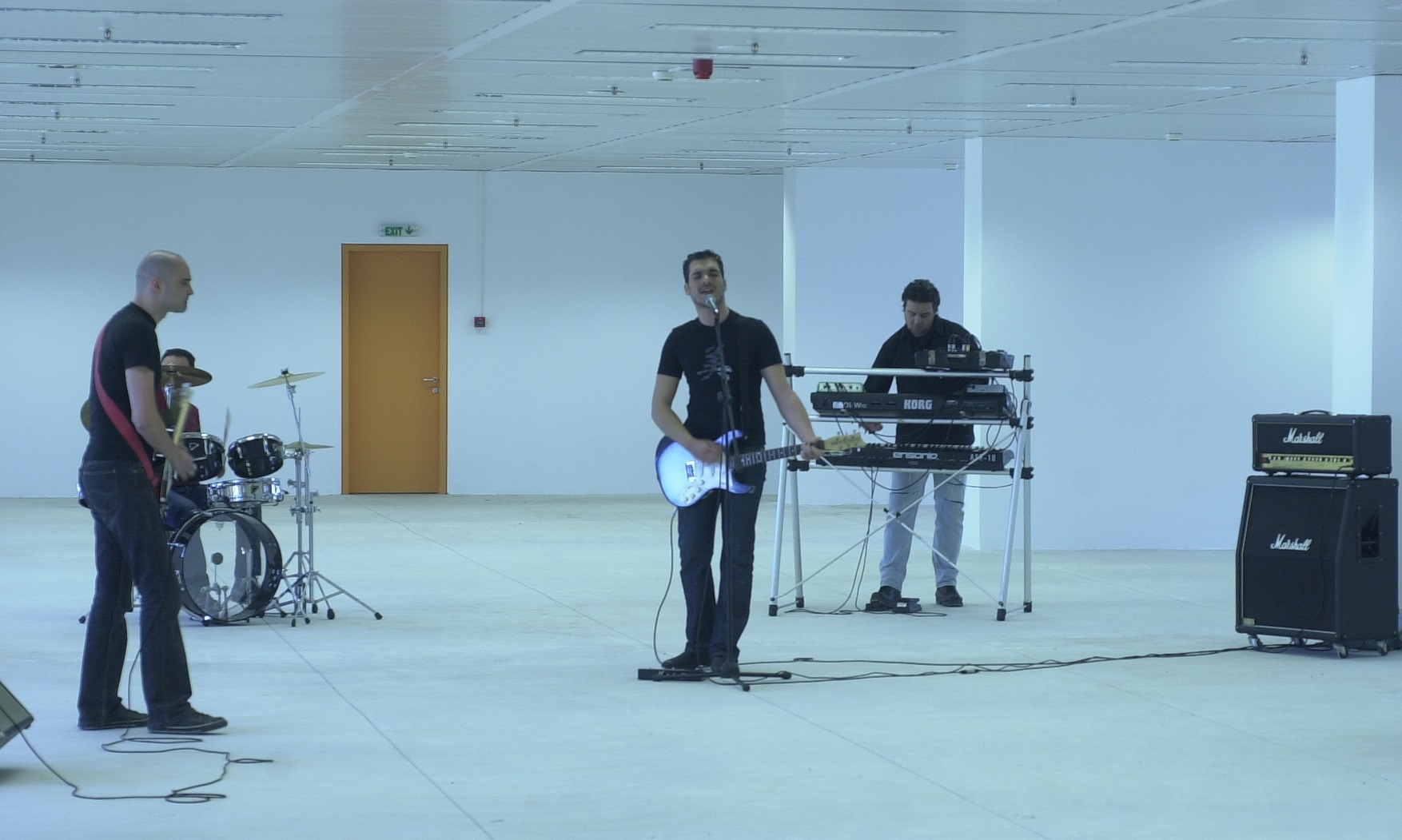

Background information
- Origin: Athens, Greece
- Genres: Rock
- Years active: 1994-present
- Labels: Amuse, Emi, Lyra, Sony
- Members: Dimitris Kanellopoulos; George Christou; Hristos Gougoumas
- Past members: George Dres; Dimitris Tsounakas; Lambros Lambrikidis; Alexandros Papasotitirou; Nikos Spanos; Ada Seraidari; Marios Varelidis; Sakis stamoulis; Nikos Zografos; Giannis Farao
- Website: Domenica

Domenica is a Greek rock band that was formed in Athens in 1994.

== Releases ==
Their personal debut album, " Άχρηστα Ρολόγια " (Useless clocks), was released in November 1999 with Manos Xydous as a producer. Their next release in April 2002 had was titled "Μέσα στη βουή του δρόμου " (In the roar of the street) . In March 2004, Domenica had their third release, " Ιστορίες για μικρούς και μεγάλους " (Stories for children and adults). In 2007, they released " Χίλιες φορές έτσι " (A thousand times that way), and in 2009, they released the album " Λήθη " (Oblivion) and in 2012 a single called 'Μια ματιά σου μπορεί' (A look of you is enough).

In 2018 they released " Perase i ora? " a tribute album for the twenty years in discography. In August 2021 they released a single called " Sigrou", and in December 2022 they released "Storgi". In March 2025 they released "Erotiki Nychta" with 15 poems set to music.

In their albums, they have set poems to music by Mitsos Papanikolaou, Napoleon Lapathiotis, George Mylonogiannis, Anthoula Stathopoulou, Maria Polydouri and Miltos Sachtouris.

== Awards ==
In 2003 Domenica were nominated for and won an Arion Music award for "Best band of entekhno". In April 2005, they were once again nominated for and won the Arion Music award for "Best alternative album". In June 2005, they won the Mad Video Music award for "Best rock video".

== Discography ==
- Ahrista rologia (1999)
- Mesa sti voui tou dromou (2002)
- Istories gia mikrous ke megalous (2004)
- Hilies fores etsi (2007)
- Lithi (2009)
- Perase i ora? (2018)
- Storgi (2022)
- Erotiki Nychta (2025)
