= Mitsos Papanikolaou =

Greek poet and journalist (1900–1943)

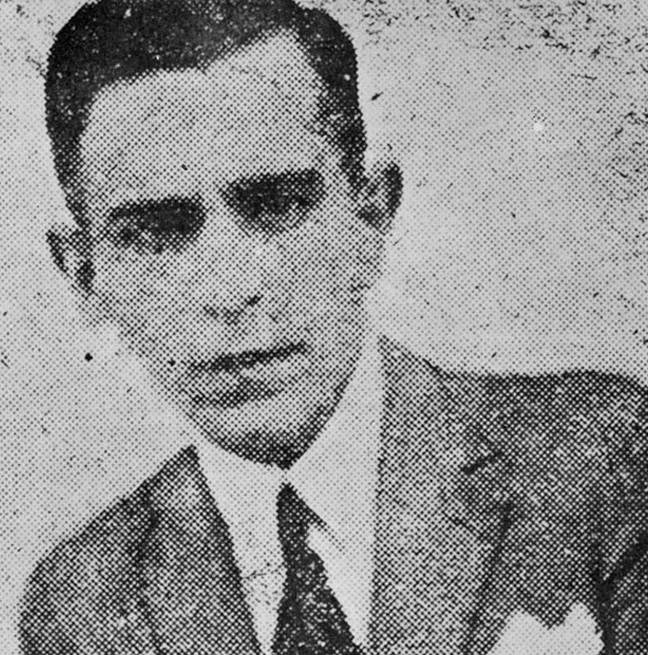
- Born: 1900; Hydra, Greece
- Died: 1943 (aged 42–43); Athens, Greece
- Occupations: Poet, journalist, poetry translator
- Writing career
- Genre: Poetry

Mitsos Papanikolaou (Hydra, 1900–1943) was a Greek poet of the interwar period.

He was born in Hydra but settled in Piraeus with his family at an early age. After finishing high school, he began writing poems which he published in Gregorios Xenopoulos magazine The Education of Children (Η Διάπλασις των Παίδων) .

He became a journalist and soon editor-in-chief and director of the magazine Bouquet. His great passion was translations, including poems by Paul Valéry, Charles Baudelaire, Czesław Miłosz, Paul Verlaine, Guillaume Apollinaire and others. He also dealt with criticism and essays. His poetic work is small in quantity. It consists of about 50 poems full of nostalgia for the lost early youth and written in the style of symbolism. These poems were first published in a volume in 1966.

The introduction and editing of this volume, entitled Poems, are by the poet Tasos Korfis. Papanikolaou was, like his friend Napoleon Lapathiotis, a drug user. When the war and the German occupation broke out, he could not satisfy his passion and so he sold all his precious books and other things, which he had kept for years, and settled in a poor room in Kokkinia. In this room he lived in miserable conditions, so his friends arranged for him to be put in a public psychiatric hospital. There he died of a drug overdose.

His poems have been published in the magazines Diaplasi ton pedon, Vomos, Neohelleniki Logotechnia, Nea Estia, Mpouketo, etc. His poems have been set to music by the band Domenica, the songwriter Giorgos Kostogiorgis and the composer Martha Menachem.
