= Francis McNamara =

Francis McNamara or Francis MacNamara may refer to:

- Frank the Poet (c. 1810–1861), born Frances MacNamara, Irish convict imprisoned in Australia who wrote poetry about his experiences while imprisoned
- Francis Knyvett McNamara (1912–1992), English cricketer
- Francis Terry McNamara (born 1927), U.S. diplomat
- Francis Macnamara (1802–1873), Member of Parliament for Clare and for Killybegs
- Francis Pershing McNamara (1920–1943), United States Air Force member who initially survived a plane crash with Louis Zamperini

== See also ==
- Frank McNamara (disambiguation)
