= Kokkinia =

Kokkinia or Kokkinias may refer to several places in Greece:

- Kokkinias, a village in the municipal unit Lichada, Euboea
- Kokkinia, Grevena, a village in the municipal unit Irakleotes, Grevena regional unit
- Kokkinia, Kilkis, a village in the municipal unit Kroussa, Kilkis regional unit
- Kokkinia, Messenia, a village in the municipal unit Methoni, Messenia
- Kokkinia, Thesprotia, a village in Filiates municipality, Thesprotia
- Kokkinia, older name for Nikaia, Athens Urban Area
