= George Mylonogiannis =

Greek poet

Giorgos Mylonogiannis
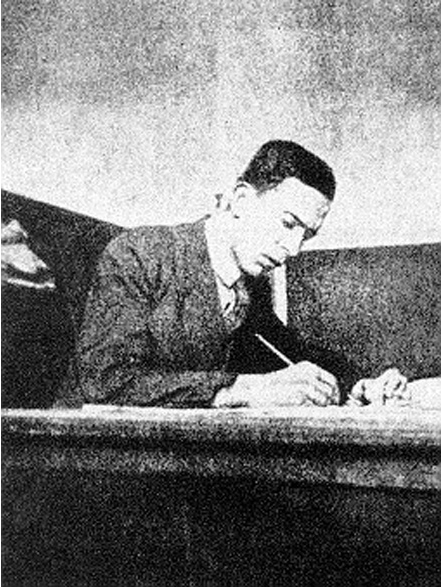
- Born: 1909; Chania, Greece
- Died: 1 August 1954 (aged 45); Athens, Greece
- Education: University of Athens
- Occupations: Poet, author
- Writing career
- Genre: Poetry

Giorgos Mylonogiannis (Greek: Γιώργος Μυλωνογιάννης; 1909 – 1954) was a Greek poet.

== Early life and education ==
He was born in 1909 in Chania, Crete, and settled in Athens with his family in 1915. He studied philology at the University of Athens, with a penchant for foreign languages and a broad intellectual culture. He published poems in literary magazines while working as a journalist, publisher and director in many publications.

== Career ==
His first poetry collection: "Towards the Light..." (1936), followed by "Metheortia" (1948) and "Anaglifa" (1951). Also known as "G. Perastikos", he maintained a literary column in the magazine Neohellenika Grammata, where he also criticized interviews with other writers. He wrote significant criticism of Skarimbas, initially as an admirer but then as a fierce critic.

=== Poetic themes ===
His poetry is characterized by a melancholic, pessimistic, introverted mood, with a clear influence from Karyotakis. It is distinguished by its immediacy and violent emotional presence — often with intense, painful honesty.

== Death ==
He struggled with drug addiction, which was a manifestation of his "mental loneliness". He died in Dromokaiteio in August 1954, in a destitute state.

== Legacy ==
The author Yannis Papakostas has dedicated a monograph entitled "Open the windows to the light", which explores the poetry and critical work of Mylonogiannis.

He is recognized as one of the last poets of the interwar period, who rendered with intensity the morbid transition of his era.

His poems have been set to music by Thanos Anestopoulos and the group Domenica.
