= Izieu =

Commune in Auvergne-Rhône-Alpes, France

- Commune
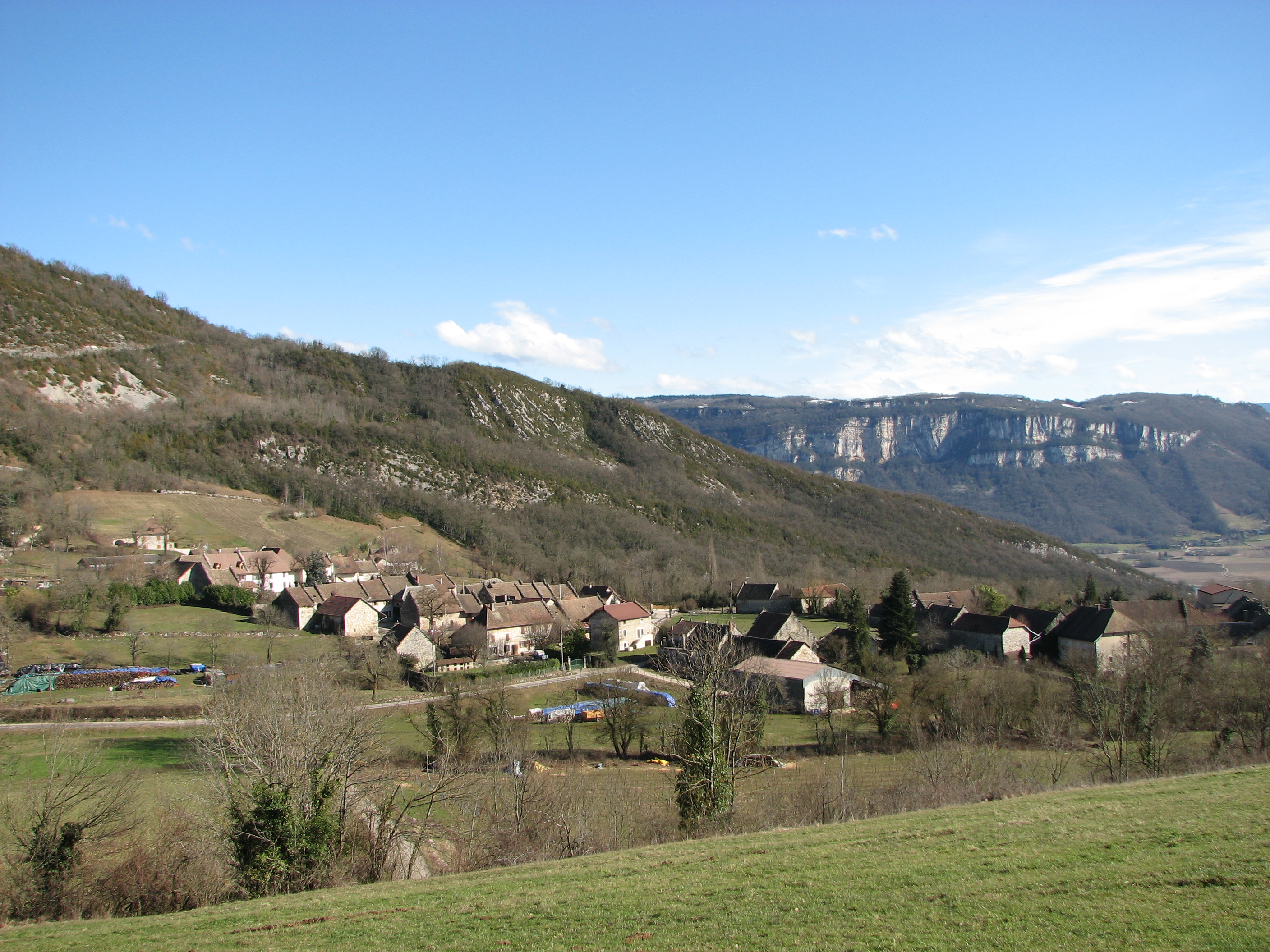
- Location of Izieu
- Location within France Location within Auvergne-Rhône-Alpes
- Coordinates: 45°39′19″N 5°38′39″E
- Country: France
- Region: Auvergne-Rhône-Alpes
- Department: Ain
- Arrondissement: Belley
- Canton: Belley

Government
  - Mayor (2026–32): Denis Martin-Barbaz
- Area^{1}: 7.67 km^{2} (2.96 sq mi)
- Elevation: 350 m (1,150 ft)
- Highest elevation: 758 m (2,487 ft)
- Lowest elevation: 211 m (692 ft)
- Population (2023): 225
  - Density: 29.3/km^{2} (76.0/sq mi)
- Time zone: UTC+01:00 (CET)
  - Summer (DST): UTC+02:00 (CEST)
- INSEE/Postal code: 01193 /01300
- ^{1} French Land Register data, which excludes lakes, ponds, glaciers > 1 km^{2} (0.386 sq mi or 247 acres) and river estuaries.

Izieu (French pronunciation: [izjø]) is a commune in the Ain department in eastern France. It lies on the river Rhône, between the cities of Lyon and Chambéry.

The Commune is infamous for the 1944 abduction by the Nazis of the children and staff from the Izieu orphanage.

== Site of World War II Jewish orphanage ==
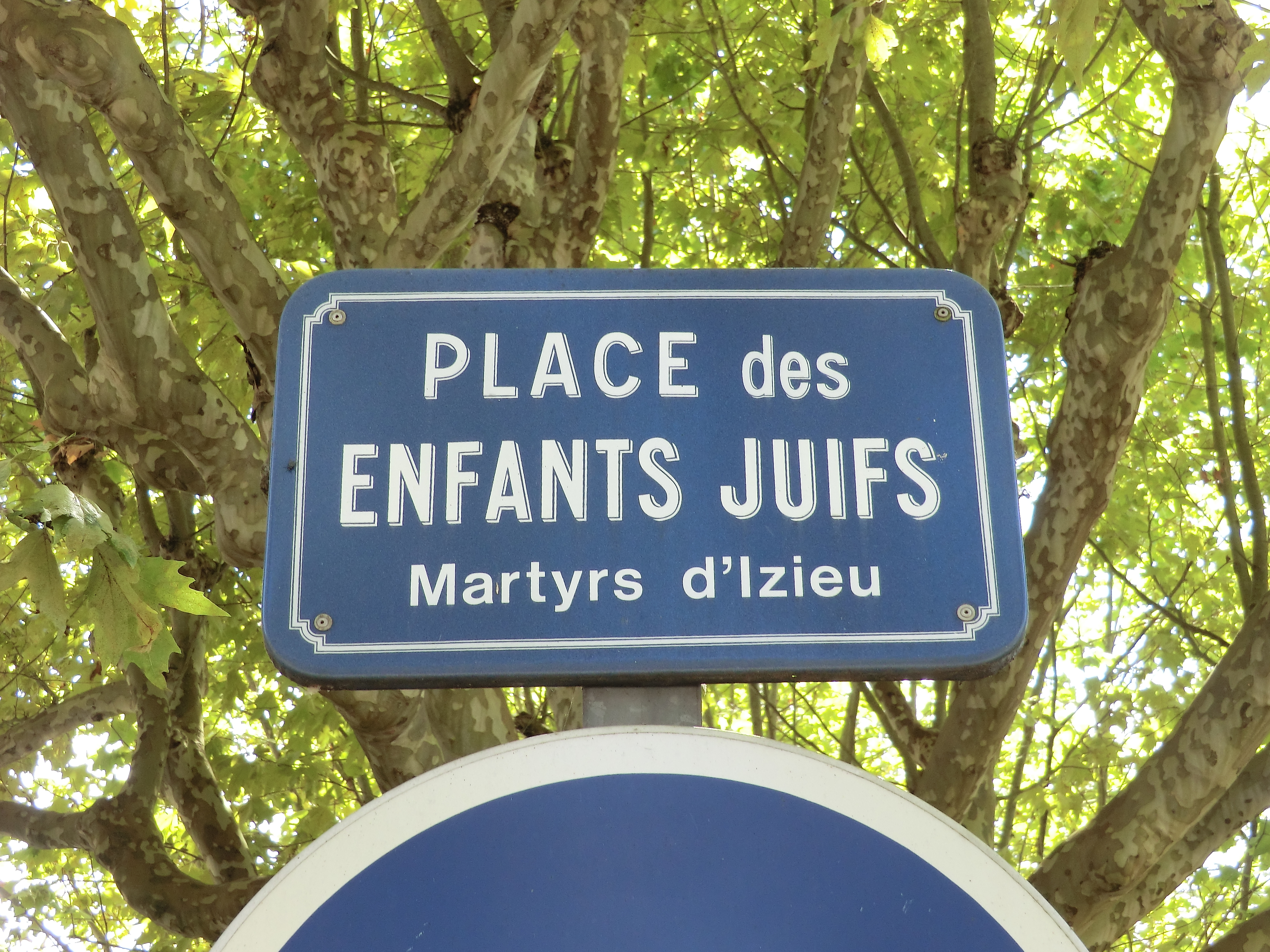
Place des Enfants Juifs

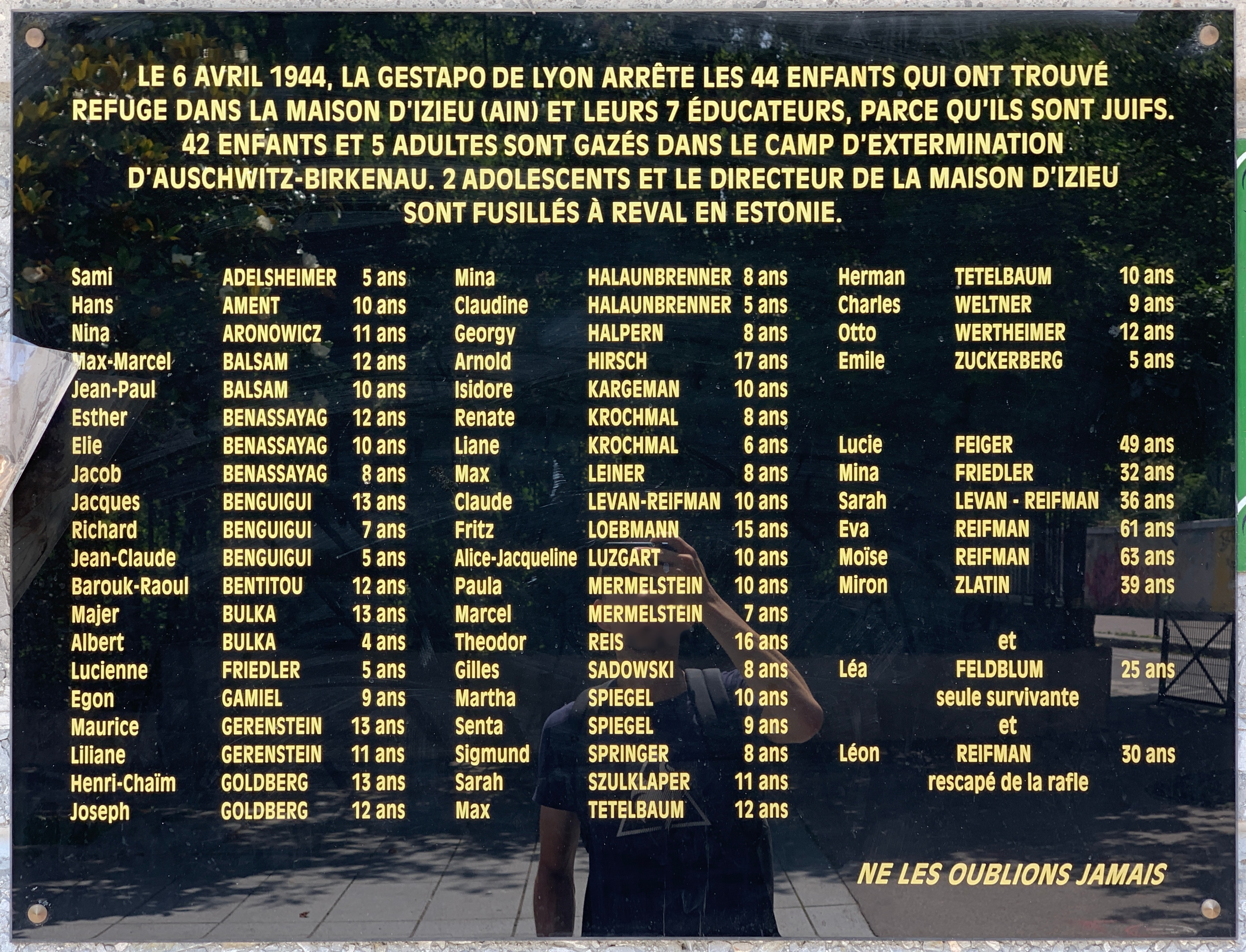
Tribute to the Jewish orphans of Izieu who perished.

Izieu was the site of a Jewish orphanage during the Second World War. However, most of the children were only separated from their parents or sent purposely in the Savoy mountains which was then under Italian rule. Italy was less oppressive in that time. On 6 April 1944, three vehicles pulled up in front of the orphanage. The Gestapo, under the direction of the 'Butcher of Lyon' Klaus Barbie, entered the orphanage and forcibly removed the forty-four children and their seven supervisors, throwing the crying and terrified children on to the trucks.

As a witness later recalled: 'I was on my way down the stairs when my sister shouted to me: It's the Germans, run away! I jumped out the window. I hid myself in a bush in the garden. I heard the cries of the children that were being kidnapped and I heard the shouts of the Nazis who were carrying them away.'

Following the raid on their home in Izieu, the children were shipped directly to the "collection center" in Drancy, then put on the first available train towards the concentration camps in the East.

Forty-two children and five adults were gassed in the concentration camp of Auschwitz. Two of the oldest children and Miron Zlatin, the superintendent, ended up in Tallinn, Estonia, and were killed by a firing squad.

The orphanage director Sabine Zlatin survived the Gestapo raid, being away collecting funds for the institution. Some 40 years later she testified against Barbie at his trial. Towards the end of her life, she convinced the president François Mitterrand to turn the orphanage premises into a memorial.

== Population ==
Historical population
Year	Pop.	±% p.a.
1968	103	—
1975	141	+4.59%
1982	136	−0.51%
1990	161	+2.13%
1999	178	+1.12%
2007	190	+0.82%
2012	211	+2.12%
2017	235	+2.18%
2023	225	−0.72%
Source: INSEE

== See also ==
- Communes of the Ain department
