= Jean Wilkins =

Canadian pediatrician (born 1945)

- Born: June 20, 1945 (age 81); Salaberry-de-Valleyfield, Quebec, Canada
- Education: Bachelor's degree Doctorate in Medicine
- Alma mater: University of Montreal; Royal College of Physicians and Surgeons of Canada
- Spouse: Josette Trépanier
- Children: 3
- Awards: Chevalier de l'Ordre National du Québec
- Scientific career
- Fields: Adolescent medicine
- Workplaces: Université de Montréal, CHU Sainte-Justine

Jean Wilkins CQ (born June 20, 1945) is a Canadian former paediatrician and adolescent medicine specialist. He is a full professor of paediatrics at the University of Montreal's Faculty of Medicine. Wilkins is known for his contributions to the field of adolescent medicine. His main research interests include adolescent drug use, teenage abortion, adolescent sexuality and the mental health effects of anorexia in teenagers.

== Early life and education ==
Wilkins was born in Salaberry-de-Valleyfield, Québec, Canada, and educated at the Valleyfield Seminar, obtaining his bachelor's degree in 1965. In 1970, he graduated from the University of Montreal with a Doctorate in Medicine, and received his medical license in 1971. In 1974, he became a certified specialist in paediatrics, recognized by the Royal College of Physicians and Surgeons of Canada. It is in 2011 that Wilkins furthered his specialization by earning a certification in adolescent medicine from the Quebec College of Physicians.

=== Fellowships ===
In 1973, Wilkins started his training in adolescent medicine at the Montefiore Hospital and Medical Center in New York, where he completed a Fellowship in 1974. That same year, he was granted Fellowship status from the Royal College of Physicians and Surgeons of Canada.

== Notable contributions ==
Jean Wilkins is known for developing holistic and mental health-focused approaches to the treatment of eating disorders in teenagers, such as anorexia nervosa. He has published many works, including the first book on adolescent medicine written in French, "Médecine de l'adolescence: une médecine spécifique" (1985). Dr. Wilkins' gentle and individualized methods for treating adolescent anorexia have since been adopted by practitioners throughout French-speaking areas worldwide.

== Medical career ==
Jean Wilkins' career spans 5 decades during which he became a world leader in the field of adolescent medicine in both academia and clinical practice, and held various positions at the University of Montreal and CHU Sainte-Justine.

=== CHU Sainte-Justine ===
In 1975, Wilkins founded the first Adolescent Medicine section in the Francophone medical community within the CHU Sainte-Justine's Department of Pediatrics, where he served as a member from 1974 to 2024.

In his early career, he focused on treating teenagers with substance abuse issues, alongside other conditions such as diabetes. Wilkins later advocated for improved sexual and reproductive health services for young women by supporting the provision of contraception to adolescent girls and the establishment of abortion services within the hospital. From 1977 to 1978, he was responsible for coordinating the liaison between CHU Sainte-Justine's Department of Paediatrics and the Montreal Urban Community Police Service to establish a comprehensive support program for victims of sexual assault.

Dr. Wilkins was involved in leadership roles at the CHU Sainte-Justine, most notably serving on the hospital's Paediatric Department's Section Chiefs Committee (1982–1989) and the Committee on Health Promotion (1996–1997).

=== Professorship ===
Jean Wilkins' career at the University of Montreal's Faculty of Medicine began in 1974 as assistant professor. He was promoted to associate professor in 1979 and became a full professor in 1986, a position he still holds as of 2024. International lecturer, Wilkins was involved in training many physicians and paediatricians who later held positions in adolescent medicine in Quebec and Europe. He also participated in the establishment of the first adolescent medicine service at a university hospital in Paris, namely Bicêtre Hospital.

He chaired the Association of Medical Clinical Educators of Montreal (AMCEM) from 1997 to 2009 and held numerous committee roles at the University of Montreal. These include serving on the Admission Committee for the medical program (1975–1993), leading as president from 1992 to 1993.

== Honours and recognition ==
- 1999: Received the Founder's Award from the International Association for Adolescent Health.
- 2012: Named "Personality of the Week" by La Presse and Radio-Canada.
- 2016: Appointed a member of the National Order of Quebec for his pioneering contributions to adolescent medicine, having treated over 2,500 young women with anorexia through his individualized and compassionate approach, which has become a reference model for medical professionals across Quebec and other international Francophone regions.

== Selected books and articles ==
=== Authored books ===
Wilkins, J. (1985). Médecine de l’adolescence: Une Médecine Spécifique. Hôpital Sainte-Justine.

Wilkins, J. (2012). Adolescentes anorexiques: Plaidoyer pour une approche clinique humaine. Presses de l'Université de Montréal.

=== Biography ===
Gagnon, K. (2019). Jean Wilkins: Le doc des ados. Canada: Groupe Fides Incorporated - Éditions La Presse.

=== Authored articles ===
Wilkins, J. & al. (2005). Eating disorders during adolescence: long term sexual, gynecological and obstetrical outcomes. Pediatric Child Health.

Wilkins, J. (2007). L’anorexie mentale à l’adolescence, vous avez les ressources pour agir ! Le Clinicien, 22(4), 71–77.

Wilkins, J., & Frappier, J.-Y. (2007). La médecine de l’adolescence à Sainte-Justine. Les enfants ont grandi et ont changé. La Petite Histoire de Sainte-Justine 1907-2007, 205–209.

Wilkins, J. (2009). Anorexie mentale et mortalité à l’adolescence. L’Actualité Médicale, 30(21), 40–42.

Wilkins, J. (2011). Anorexie mentale durant l’adolescence. Recueil de Textes, 1–47.

Wilkins, J. & al. (2012). 58. Sociodemographic, Clinical, Psychological and Behavioral Characteristics of Children 8-12 Years Old Hospitalized for an Eating Disorder. Journal of Adolescent Health. 50. S42. 10.1016/j.jadohealth.2011.10.117.

Wilkins, J. & al. (2012). Retrospective study of children (8–12 years) treated for eating disorders over a 15-year period. Neuropsychiatrie de l'Enfance et de l'Adolescence. 60. S154-S155. 10.1016/j.neurenf.2012.04.181

Wilkins, J. (2014). Addiction à l’adolescence: quelques facettes et une réponse institutionnelle. Addictions Chez l’enfant et l’adolescent, 223–226.

Wilkins, J. & al. (2016). La cyberthérapie dans le traitement de L’HYPERPHAGIE boulimique : Recension de la Littérature. Revue Québécoise de Psychologie, 37(1), 61–86. 10.7202/1040104ar

Wilkins, J. (2021). Anorexie en temps de pandémie : le difficile défi de soigner à distance. The Conversation. https://theconversation.com/anorexie-en-temps-de-pandemie-le-difficile-defi-de-soigner-a-distance-153849.
