= National Order of Quebec =

Civilian honour for merit in Canada

National Order of Quebec Ordre national du Québec
- Insignia of the Grades of the National Order of Quebec

Awarded by the lieutenant governor of Quebec-in-Council
- Type: Order of merit (provincial)
- Established: 20 June 1984
- Motto: Honneur au peuple du Québec (French for 'Homage to the people of Quebec')
- Eligibility: Residents of Quebec nominated by the Council and non-Quebecers nominated by the Premier of Quebec
- Status: Currently constituted
- Founder: Gilles Lamontagne
- Chancellor: Not applicable, as unlike other provincial orders, the National Order of Quebec has no chancellor
- Grades: Grand Officer (grand officier/grande officière) (GOQ); Officer (officier/officière) (OQ); Knight (chevalier/chevalière) (CQ)
- Website: Official website

Precedence
- Next (higher): Venerable Order of Saint John
- Next (lower): Saskatchewan Order of Merit
- Ribbon bar of a Grand Officer Ribbon bar of an Officer Ribbon bar of a Knight

The National Order of Quebec (French: l'Ordre national du Québec), also known as the Order of Quebec, is a civilian honour for merit in the Canadian province of Quebec. Instituted in 1984 when Lieutenant Governor Jean-Pierre Côté granted royal assent to the Loi sur l'Ordre national du Québec (National Order of Quebec Act), the order is administered by the Governor-in-Council and is intended to honour current or former Quebec residents for conspicuous achievements in any field, being thus described as the highest honour in Quebec. In 1986, the order was expanded to include honorary membership for people outside Quebec.

== Structure and appointment ==
Although the National Order of Quebec was established with the granting of royal assent by Quebec's lieutenant governor and the Canadian sovereign is the fount of honour, the viceroy does not, as in other provinces, form an explicit part of the organization. Instead, the monarch's representative is related to the order only by virtue of his or her place in council, collectively termed the government of Quebec, to which the constitution of the Order of Quebec makes specific reference.

The order contains three grades, each with accordant post-nominal letters and place in the Canadian order of precedence for honours, decorations, and medals. They are, in descending hierarchical order: (Note: The grade titles in French are gendered; they are given here with the male versions first.)

- Grand Officer (grand officier/grande officière; GOQ)
- Officer (officier/officière; OQ)
- Knight (chevalier/chevalière; CQ)

Nominations to the National Order of Quebec are sought in Quebec's daily and weekly media publications and are directed to the Council of the National Order of Quebec, elected by and amongst the members of the order for a period of three years and headed by a president elected by the council for two years. (Note: As of March 2026, members of the Council of the National Order of Quebec are: John R. Porter, President; Louise Cordeau, Vice-President; Claire Bolduc; Simon Brault; Guy Breton; Pierre Bruneau; Paul Grand'Maison; Maryse Lassonde; and Jean-Claude Poitras.) This body is mandated to short-list candidates and forward their suggestions to the Governor-in-Council. Any person born, living, or who has lived in Quebec, save for anyone serving as a Member of the National Assembly of Quebec, is eligible to be nominated, and names may be submitted posthumously. The Cabinet may also, without the input of the Council of the National Order of Quebec, put forward the names of non-Quebecers for appointment as honorary members. Promotion through the grades is possible for both substantive and honorary members. Admission recognizes conspicuous meritorious actions that improve or support Quebec or its language and culture.

== Insignia ==
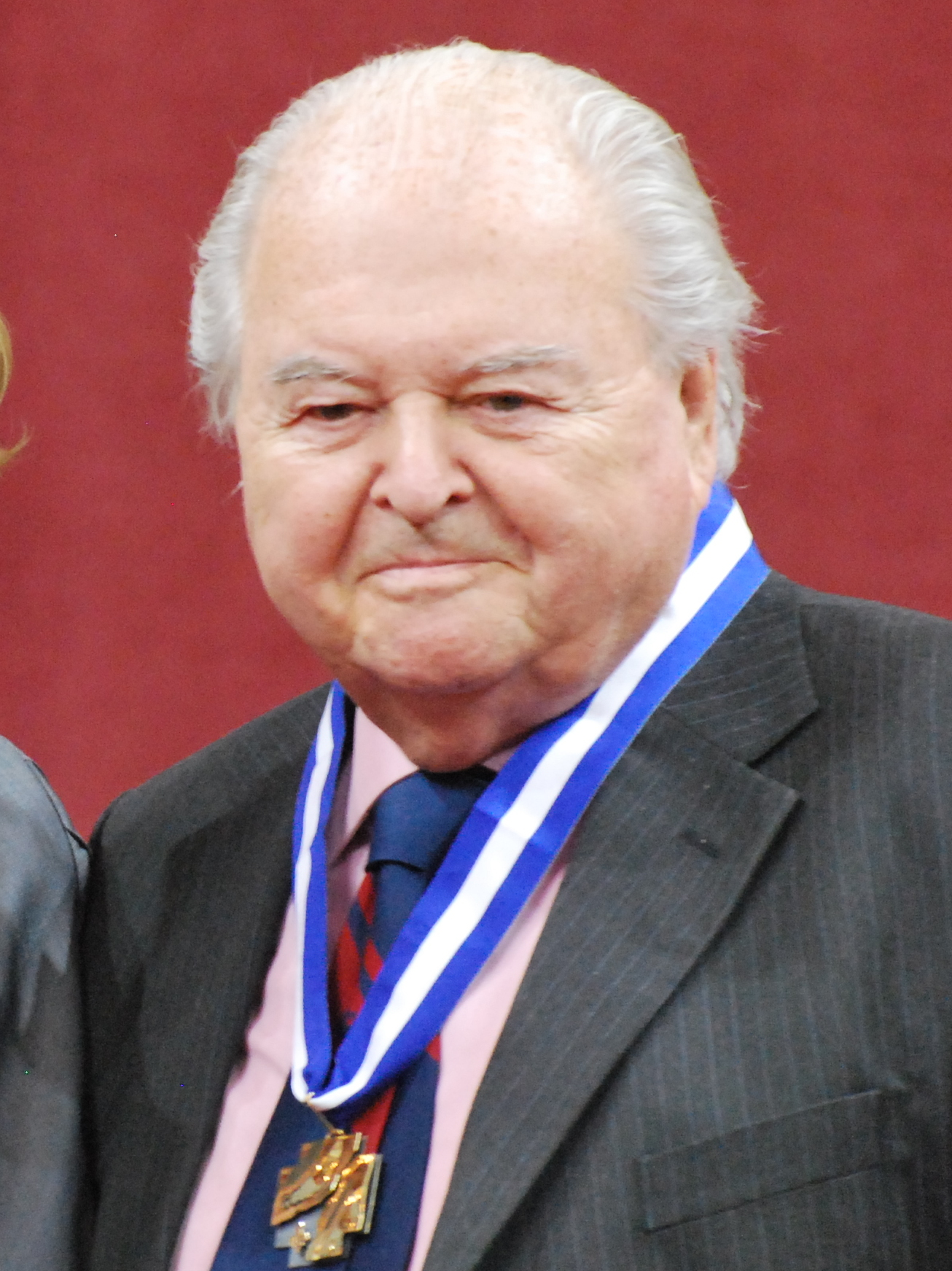
Frederick Andermann wearing the insignia of an Officer in 2013

Upon admission into the Order of Quebec, members are presented with various insignia of the organization—a medallion, miniature, and button. All are administered by the Regulations for the Insignia of the National Order of Quebec and were designed by Madeleine Dansereau, who was inspired by the heraldic elements of the provincial flag, notably the colours of blue and white used on the order's ribbon and the fleur-de-lis.

- The badge of a Grand Officer consists of two 18kt gold plates, in the shape of a cross formed by two 60 millimetres (2.4 in) by 40 millimetres (1.6 in) arms, symmetrically superimposed atop one another 4 mm apart, the obverse face a high-polish, rusticated surface; at the lower left corner is a white enamel fleur-de-lis. On the reverse of the badge is inscribed the order's motto—Honneur au peuple du Québec (homage to the people of Quebec)—and a serial number at the base of the vertical bar.
- The badge for Officers is of a nearly identical design, but made of arms 50 millimetres (2.0 in) long by 25 millimetres (0.98 in) wide, the obverse plate in 18k gold with an applied gold fleur-de-lis, and the rear in sterling silver.
- Knights have a medal with a 40 millimetres (1.6 in) diameter, brushed silver medallion with a symmetrically placed, etched cross with arms 30 millimetres (1.2 in) long by 20 millimetres (0.79 in) wide and filled with a highly polished, rusticated surface; a gold fleur-de-lis is mounted at the lower, left side of the cross.

Each member will also receive miniature versions of their insignia, identical in appearance save for size: those for all grades being 18 millimetres (0.71 in) wide in each direction or in circumference. A lapel pin is also used for wear on casual civilian clothing. Male members wear their emblems suspended from a 38 millimetres (1.5 in) wide ribbon, at the collar for Grand Officers and Officers, and on a vertical ribbon on a medal bar on the left chest for Knights; women Grand Officers and Officers wear their insignia on a ribbon bow pinned at the left shoulder, and female Knights carry their medals in the same fashion as the men. The ribbon for miniatures is 18 millimetres (0.71 in) wide.

The regulations of the National Order of Quebec stipulate that the premier presents new inductees with their insignia, either on the National Holiday of Quebec or another day during the National Week. The ceremony takes place in the Salon Rouge of the parliament building in Quebec City, though exceptions are sometimes made when inductees cannot be present (notably for some non-Quebecer appointments). The insignia remain property of the Crown in Right of Quebec and must be returned upon a holder's cessation of membership in the society, whether by death or dismissal.

== Inductees ==
Flag of the National Order of Quebec

The following are some notable appointees into the National Order of Quebec:

=== Quebec inductees ===
==== Grand Officer ====
- Jean Victor Allard CC CBE GOQ DSO ED CD, Chief of the Defence Staff, appointed 1985
- Marcel Bélanger OC GOQ, economist, appointed 1994
- Jean Béliveau CC GOQ, hockey player, appointed 2010
- Lucien Bouchard PC GOQ, 27th Premier of Quebec, appointed 2008
- Robert Bourassa GOQ, 22nd Premier of Quebec, appointed posthumously 2008
- Jean Campeau GOQ, politician and businessman, appointed Grand Officer in 1990
- Leonard Cohen CC GOQ, singer-songwriter, appointed 2008
- Maurice Couture CC, Archbishop of Quebec 1990–2002, appointed 2003
- Robert Després CC GOQ, businessman, appointed 2003
- Jean Drapeau CC GOQ, mayor of Montreal, appointed 1987
- Marcelle Ferron GOQ, painter and stained glass artist, appointed 1992
- Gérard Filion GOQ, newspaper director, appointed 1989
- Armand Frappier CC GOQ, researcher, appointed 1985
- Paul Gérin-Lajoie CC GOQ QC, appointed Officer in 1987 and Grand Officer in 1998
- Phil Gold CC GOQ FRSC FRCPC MACP, scientist, physician, appointed Officer in 1989 and Grand Officer in 2019
- Hubert Reeves CC OQ, astrophysicist, appointed officer in 1994 and Grand Officer in 2017.
- Louise Arbour CC CMM COM GOQ CD, jurist, lawyer, prosecutor, 31st Governor General of Canada since 2026. Appointed Grand Officer in 2009.
- Emmett Johns CM GOQ, Canadian priest and humanitarian, appointed 2003
- Daniel Johnson Jr. GOQ, 25th Premier of Quebec, appointed 2008
- Pierre-Marc Johnson GOQ, 24th Premier of Quebec, appointed 2008
- Phyllis Barbara Lambert CC GOQ OAL FRAIC FRSC FRCA, architect and philanthropist
- Bernard Landry GOQ, 28th Premier of Quebec, appointed 2008
- Charles Philippe Leblond GOQ, scientist, professor, appointed Grand Officer in 2001
- Félix Leclerc OC GOQ, singer-songwriter, appointed 1985
- Jean Paul Lemieux CC GOQ, painter, appointed posthumously 1997
- René Lévesque GOQ, 23rd Premier of Quebec, appointed posthumously 2008
- Martin Brian Mulroney PC CC GOQ, 18th Prime Minister of Canada, appointed 2002
- Alanis Obomsawin OC GOQ, filmmaker, First Nations activist, appointed 2016
- Jacques Parizeau GOQ, 26th Premier of Quebec, appointed 2008
- Jean-Paul Riopelle CC GOQ, painter, appointed Officer in 1988 and Grand Officer in 1994
- Ethel Stark CM GOQ, violinist and conductor, appointed 2003
- Charles Taylor CC GOQ FRSC FBA, philosopher, appointed 2003
- Jean Vanier CC GOQ, philanthropist, theologian, founder of L'Arche, appointed 1992
- Gilles Vigneault GOQ, singer-songwriter, appointed Knight in 1985 and Grand Officer in 2000

==== Officer ====
- Yves Beauchemin OQ, novelist, appointed 2003
- Laurent Beaudoin CMG CC OQ FCA, businessman appointed 1990
- Francesco Bellini CM OQ, research scientist and entrepreneur, appointed 2004
- Yoshua Bengio OQ, computer scientist, appointed 2025
- Daniel Borsuk OQ, plastic surgeon, appointed 2019
- Michel Brault OQ, filmmaker, appointed 2003
- Boris Brott OC OOnt OQ, conductor, appointed 2014
- Solange Chaput-Rolland OC OQ, appointed 1985
- Jean Coutu OC OQ, businessman, appointed 1993
- Richard Cruess CC OQ FRSC, orthopaedic surgeon and academic, appointed 2003
- Bernard Derome CM OQ, news anchor, appointed 2006
- Céline Dion CC OQ, singer, appointed 1998
- Léon Dion OC OQ FRSC, author, teacher, intellectual, appointed 1990
- Fernand Dumont OQ, author, intellectual, appointed 1992
- Marie-Hélène Falcon OQ, dance and theatre, appointed 2003
- Denise Filiatrault OC OQ, playwright, actor, appointed 2000
- Anne Hébert CC OQ, writer, appointed 1985
- Larkin Kerwin CC OQ FRSC, physicist, appointed 1988
- Lucia Kowaluk CC OQ, community activist, appointed 2014
- Louis Laberge OQ, union leader, appointed 1988
- Normand Laprise OQ, chef and author, appointed 2009
- Robert Lepage CC OQ, playwright, filmmaker, appointed 1999
- Monique F. Leroux, CM OQ businesswoman, appointed 2012
- Jean-Louis Lévesque CM OQ, entrepreneur, philanthropist, appointed 1991
- Vincent Lemieux OQ, professor and political scientist, appointed 2003
- André Melançon OQ, actor, screenwriter and film director, appointed 2013
- Gaston Miron OQ, poet, appointed 1996
- Ted Moses OQ, aboriginal chief, appointed 2002
- Louise Otis OQ, judge, appointed 2003
- Denise Ouellet-Grenier OQ, director of the L'Ordre national du Québec until 2001, appointed 2003
- Lise Payette OQ, politician, writer, appointed 2001
- Pierre Péladeau CM OQ businessman, appointed 1989
- Louise Penny OC OQ, author, appointed 2017
- Maurice Richard PC OC OQ, hockey player, appointed 1985
- Mary Simon OC OQ, Governor General of Canada, appointed 1992
- Mary Two-Axe Earley OQ, women's rights activist, appointed 1985
- Jacques Villeneuve OQ, racing driver, appointed 1998

==== Knight ====
- Jacques Amyot CQ, long-distance swimmer, appointed 2001
- Denys Arcand CC CQ, filmmaker, appointed 1990
- Frédéric Back OC CQ, animator, appointed 1989
- Alice Benjamin, appointed 1993
- Sylvie Bernier OC CQ, Olympic diver, appointed 1985
- Ferdinand Biondi OC CQ, radio broadcaster, appointed 1985
- Neil Bissoondath OC CQ, author, appointed 2010
- Denise Bombardier CQ, journalist, appointed 2000
- Claire Bonenfant CQ, president of the Quebec Status of Women Council, appointed 1991
- Émile Bouchard CQ, hockey player, appointed 2008
- Gaétan Boucher OC CQ, speed skater, appointed 1985
- Isabelle Boulay CQ, singer, appointed 2012
- Pierre Bourque CQ, mayor of Montreal, appointed 1993
- Françoise David CQ, social and feminist activist, appointed 1999
- Yvon Deschamps CQ, comedian, appointed 2001
- Jean Duceppe CQ, actor, appointed 1985
- Diane Dufresne CQ, singer and painter, appointed 2002
- Laurent Duvernay-Tardif CQ, NFL player, appointed 2019
- Gad Elmaleh, comedian, appointed 2017
- Marc Favreau OC CQ, actor, appointed 1995
- Jean-Pierre Ferland OC CQ, singer-songwriter
- Madeleine Ferron CQ, writer, appointed 1992
- Daniel Germain CQ, philanthropist, appointed 1997
- Jacques Godbout CQ, writer and filmmaker, appointed 1998
- Marc-André Hamelin OC CQ, pianist
- Otto Joachim CQ, composer, musician, painter, appointed 1993
- Roland-Benoît Jomphe OC CQ, poet, appointed 1987
- Oliver Theophilus Jones OC CQ, pianist, organist, composer and arranger, appointed 1994
- Pauline Julien CQ, singer-songwriter, appointed 1997
- Madeleine Juneau CQ, museologist, teacher, nun, appointed 2017
- Marie-Claire Kirkland-Casgrain CM CQ, appointed 1985
- Françoise Labbé CQ, artist, appointed 1997
- Jacques Lacombe CQ, conductor, appointed 2012
- Jacques Lacoursière CM CQ, historian, appointed 2002
- Guy Lafleur OC CQ, hockey player, appointed 2005
- Guy Laliberté OC CQ, appointed 1997
- Mario Lemieux OC CQ, hockey player, appointed 2009
- Michel Lemieux OC CQ, performance artist and theatre director, appointed 2014
- Édouard Lock OC CQ, dancer, appointed 2001
- Louis Lortie OC CQ, pianist, appointed 1998
- Norman McLaren CC CQ, animator and filmmaker, appointed 1985
- Julie Payette OC CQ, astronaut, appointed 2000
- Oscar Peterson CC CQ OOnt, jazz musician, appointed 1991
- Chantal Petitclerc CC CQ, MSM, wheelchair athlete, Canadian senator, appointed 2005
- Samuel Pierre, professor, appointed 2009
- Victor Pilon OC CQ, director, theatre designer, visual designer and photographer, appointed 2014
- Luc Plamondon OC CQ, songwriter, appointed 1990
- Marie-Philip Poulin CQ, hockey player, appointed 2024
- Jean-Louis Roux CC CQ, actor and Lieutenant Governor of Quebec, appointed 1989
- Hubert Sacy CC CQ, General manager of Éduc’alcool, appointed 2010
- Pierre Théberge OC CQ, Museum director
- Michèle Thibodeau-DeGuire CM CQ, engineer, appointed in 2005
- Michel Tremblay CQ, playwright and author, appointed 1991
- Alain Trudel CQ, conductor and trombonist, appointed 2019
- Jesús Carles de Vilallonga CQ, painter, appointed 2011
- Denis Villeneuve OC CQ, director and screenwriter, appointed in 2019
- Jean Wilkins CQ, specialized physician (adolescent medicine), appointed 2016
- Paul Zumthor CQ, medievalist and literary historian, appointed 1992

=== Non-Quebec inductees ===
==== Honorary Grand Officer ====
- Charles Dutoit OC GOQ, conductor, appointed 1995
- François Hollande GCB GOQ, President of France, appointed 2014

==== Honorary Officer ====
- Raymond Barre OQ, Prime Minister of France, appointed 1986
- Jacques Chirac OAL, OQ, President of France, appointed 1987
- Jim Douglas OQ, Governor of Vermont, appointed 2010
- Michel Drucker OQ, television host, appointed Knight 2001, Officer 2010
- Laurent Fabius OQ, Prime Minister of France, appointed 1986
- Lionel Jospin OQ, Prime Minister of France, appointed 1998
- Alain Juppé OQ, Prime Minister of France, appointed 1996
- Antonine Maillet PC CC OQ ONB FRSC, Acadian writer and playwright, appointed 1990
- Nana Mouskouri OQ, Greek singer, appointed 2013
- Alain Peyrefitte OQ, French politician, appointed 1998
- Jordi Pujol OQ, President of the Generalitat of Catalonia, appointed 1996
- Jean-Pierre Raffarin OQ, Prime Minister of France, appointed 2003
- Michel Rocard AC, OQ, Prime Minister of France, appointed 2000
- Philippe Séguin OQ, President of the French National Assembly, appointed 2000
- Edmund Stoiber OQ, Minister-President of Bavaria, appointed 2003
- Vaira Vīķe-Freiberga GCB, OC, OQ, President of Latvia, appointed 2006

==== Honorary Knight ====
- David Azrieli CM CQ, architect, appointed 1999
- Gérard Depardieu CQ, actor, appointed 2002, removed from order 2023
- Bernard Pivot OC CQ, television host, appointed 2001

== See also ==
- Prix du Québec
- Symbols of Quebec
- Orders, decorations, and medals of the Canadian provinces
- Canadian honours order of wearing
