= Francis Knyvett McNamara =

English cricketer

Personal information
- Full name: Francis Knyvett McNamara
- Born: 30 April 1912; Mussoorie, United Provinces, British Raj
- Died: 7 January 1992 (aged 79); Worthing, Sussex, England
- Batting: Right-handed
- Bowling: Left-arm medium

Career statistics
Competition	First-class
Matches	1
Runs scored	18
Batting average	9.00
100s/50s	–/–
Top score	16
Balls bowled	–
Wickets	–
Bowling average	–
5 wickets in innings	–
10 wickets in match	–
Best bowling	–
Catches/stumpings	–/–
- Source: Cricinfo, 9 April 2013

Francis Knyvett McNamara (30 April 1912 – 7 January 1992) was an English cricketer. McNamara was a right-handed batsman who bowled left-arm medium pace. He was born at Mussoorie in the British Raj, and was educated at Marlborough College.

McNamara made a single first-class appearance for the Free Foresters against Cambridge University at Fenner's in 1952. In a match which Cambridge University won by an innings and 89 runs, he made scores of 16 opening the batting in the Free Foresters first-innings, before he was dismissed caught and bowled by John Warr, while in their second-innings he was dismissed for 2 runs by Charles Kenny. This was his only first-class appearance.

He died at Worthing, Sussex on 7 January 1992.
