= Nea Trapezounta, Grevena =

Village in Western Macedonia, Greece

Nea Trapezounta Νέα Τραπεζούντα
- Settlement
- Location within Greece
- Coordinates: 40°12.3′N 21°28.5′E
- Country: Greece
- Administrative region: Western Macedonia
- Regional unit: Grevena
- Municipality: Grevena
- Municipal unit: Irakleotes
- Community: Kokkinia
- Elevation: 650 m (2,130 ft)

Population (2021)
  - Total: 11
- Time zone: UTC+2 (EET)
  - Summer (DST): UTC+3 (EEST)
- Postal code: 510 30
- Area code: +30-2462
- Vehicle registration: PN

Nea Trapezounta (Greek: Νέα Τραπεζούντα) is a village of the Grevena municipality. Before the 2011 local government reform it was a part of the municipality of Irakleotes. The 2021 census recorded 11 residents in the village. Nea Trapezounta is a part of the community of Kokkinia.

Populated by Greek refugees, Nea Trapezounta was a neighbourhood belonging to the village of Kokkinia. In the 1981 census it was listed as a separate new village.

== See also ==
- List of settlements in the Grevena regional unit
