= Daniel Germain =

Canadian philanthropist

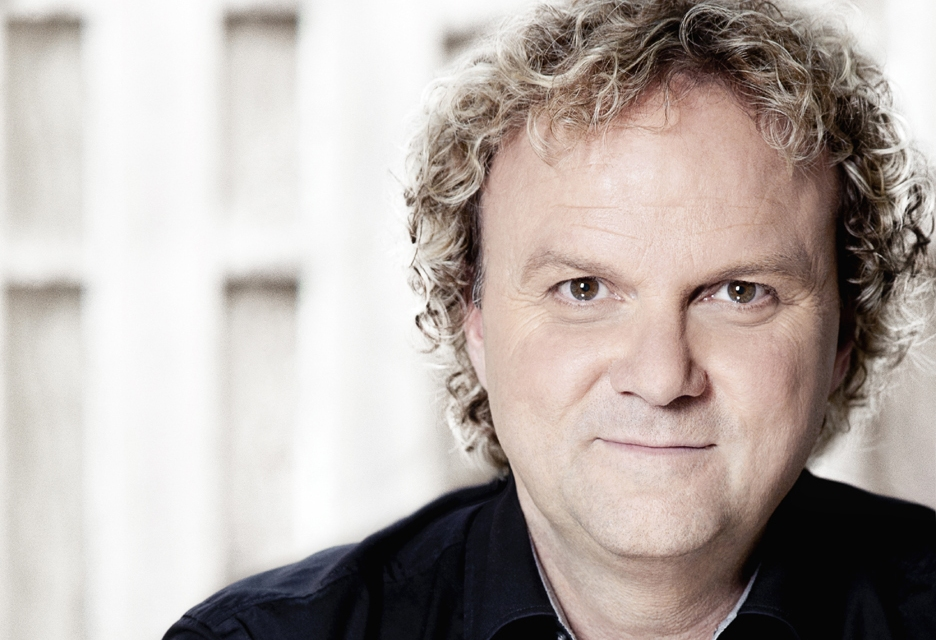
- Born: 1964 (age 60–61); Verdun, Quebec
- Known for: President and founder of the Breakfast Club of Canada

Daniel Germain, CM CQ MSM (born 1964) is a Canadian philanthropist. He is president and founder of the Breakfast Club of Canada, a Canadian charity that promotes and assists the establishment and maintenance of school breakfast programs in Canada. The Breakfast Club provides more than 48 million breakfasts every year to more than 250,000 students in over 1,900 schools across Canada. Daniel is an Order of Canada recipient and Member of the Advisory Council for the Order of Canada.

== Background ==
Born in Verdun, Quebec, his parents broke up when he was young and he spent much of his childhood in foster care. Struggling in school, he dropped out and spent his late teens and early 20s as a smalltime drug dealer, before resolving to change his life after getting arrested and spending some time in jail in the late 1980s.

He joined a Canadian International Development Agency relief program to Mexico, and participated in 60 aid trips to Mexico and Haiti over the next five years. Daniel has 3 children.

== Breakfast Club of Canada ==
In 1994, he launched a breakfast program at an elementary school in Longueuil, Quebec, which expanded into the Club des petits dejeuners du Québec. The organization further expanded into the rest of Canada in 2005 as the Breakfast Club of Canada.

In 2006, he created the Millennium Promise Summit, an annual conference of global leaders and activists on strategies to eliminate child poverty.

== Honours ==
In 2004, Germain was awarded the Meritorious Service Medal. In 2007, he was made a Knight of the National Order of Quebec.

In 2009, he was made a member of the Order of Canada and in 2012 he was awarded the Queen Elizabeth II Diamond Jubilee Medal.

In 2011, Correlieu Secondary School in Quesnel, British Columbia, upon learning that Germain had never completed his high school education, granted him an honorary high school diploma.
