= Frank McNamara =

Frank McNamara may refer to:

- Frank McNamara (musician), Irish arranger, conductor, composer, and pianist
- Frank McNamara (RAAF officer) (1894–1961), Australian Victoria Cross recipient and air force officer
- Frank L. McNamara Jr. (born 1947), United States Attorney for the District of Massachusetts, 1987–1989
- Frank X. McNamara, co-founder of Diners Club

== See also ==
- Francis McNamara (disambiguation)
