= Vern Lamprell =

Australian rules footballer

Personal information
- Full name: Vern Lamprell
- Born: 2 March 1911
- Died: 21 September 1996 (aged 85)
- Original team: Woodend
- Height: 188 cm (6 ft 2 in)
- Weight: 86 kg (190 lb)

Playing career^{1}
Years	Club	Games (Goals)
1935–1936	Footscray	12 (5)
- ^{1} Playing statistics correct to the end of 1936.

Vern Lamprell (2 March 1911 – 21 September 1996) was a former Australian rules footballer who played with Footscray in the Victorian Football League (VFL).
