= Wally Spencer =

Australian rules footballer

Personal information
- Full name: Wally Spencer
- Born: 5 January 1924
- Died: 1 September 1996 (aged 72)
- Original team: Balwyn
- Height: 185 cm (6 ft 1 in)
- Weight: 79 kg (174 lb)

Playing career^{1}
Years	Club	Games (Goals)
1946	Hawthorn	13 (0)
- ^{1} Playing statistics correct to the end of 1946.

Wally Spencer (5 January 1924 – 1 September 1996) was an Australian rules footballer who played with Hawthorn in the Victorian Football League (VFL).
