= Claire Bonenfant =

- Born: 27 June 1925; Saint-Jean-de-l'Île-d'Orléans, Quebec, Canada
- Died: 29 September 1996 (aged 71); Canada
- Other name: Claire Bonenfant Pouliot
- Occupations: politician, journalist, writer, women's rights advocate, feminist
- Years active: 1950s-1996
- Known for: Equality and anti-sexism initiatives

Claire Bonenfant (27 June 1925 – 29 September 1996) was a Canadian politician and champion of feminist rights. A Chevalier of the Ordre national du Québec, Bonenfant was president of the Quebec Status of Women Council. The University of Laval's "Claire Bonenfant Chair in Women's Studies" is named in her honour.

== Biography ==
Claire Bonenfant was born 27 June 1925 in Saint-Jean, Île d'Orléans, Quebec to Alphonse Bonenfant and Georgia Pouliot. She studied library sciences and became a bookseller. During this time, she wrote numerous articles published in a wide variety of newspapers and magazines and in 1976 made a feminist video called De femmes en filles.

In 1978, she became the President of the Council on the Status of Women and held that position until 1984. Beginning in 1979, she launched an initiative against sexism in advertising, establishing a rating system which awarded "′Déméritas′ awards for advertisers whose messages were deemed sexist and the ′Éméritas′ awards for advertisers who were helping to break down sexist stereotypes". She worked to develop the first government policy on the status of women publishing numerous studies, which reviewed the social and economic situation of women in Quebec. During her tenure, the Council founded La Gazette des femmes (The Women's Gazette) which became both an educational paper and a feminist vehicle, giving women a voice in issues which effected their lives. In 1983, Bonenfant launched another anti-sexism program called Pareille, pas pareils, aimed at educational equality. That same year, the Council held the first forum in Canada on women and the economy, entitled Les femmes: une force économique insoupçonnée, in Montreal which had around 1,000 attendees. She participated in the hearings of Bill 89, which aimed at establishing reform of the Family Law and Civil Code, and was instrumental in creating the law for pay equity, which finally passed in 1996.

From 1984 to 1987, Bonenfant served as Commissioner of the Quebec Regulator of the Cinema and in February 1989, she revived and became president of the Quebec Book Fair, serving in that capacity for the next six years. During this period, she also coordinated the programs for equal access for the Ministry of Higher Education and Science of the Government of Québec until 1 April 1990. In 1991, she was awarded the rank of Chevalière by the Ordre National du Québec. In 1993, she received the Governor General's Award in Commemoration of the Persons Case.

Bonenfant died on 29 September 1996.

== Legacy ==
In 1997, an award to honor the citizen or group which best embodied democratic principals was established in her honour, as was the "Claire Bonenfant Chair in Women's Studies" at the University of Laval. The distinguished citizen award was last awarded in 2005. A street in Québec City also bears her name.

== Selected works ==
- Bonenfant, Claire (1979). La reforme du code civil (Report) (in French). Quebec(Prov.): Conseil du Statut de la Femme.
- Bonenfant, Claire (1979). Les femmes et la course a obstacles (Report) (in French). Quebec(Prov.): Conseil du Statut de la Femme.
- Bonenfant, Claire (1979). Le financement des services de garde (Report) (in French). Quebec(Prov.): Conseil du Statut de la Femme.
- Bonenfant, Claire; Lepage, Francine (1979). Notre société doit s'adapter au travail des femmes (Report) (in French). Quebec(Prov.): Conseil du Statut de la Femme.
- Bonenfant, Claire (1979). Le conseil du statut de la femme (Report) (in French). Quebec(Prov.): Conseil du Statut de la Femme.
- Bonenfant, Claire (1979). Les Québécoises à l'heure du choix: l'influence ou le pouvoir? (Report) (in French). Quebec(Prov.): Conseil du Statut de la Femme.
- Bonenfant, Claire (1979). Des faits connus, une violence cachee (Report) (in French). Quebec(Prov.): Conseil du Statut de la Femme.
- Bonenfant, Claire (1980). La Pression des femmes: un pouvoir efficace? (Report) (in French). Quebec(Prov.): Conseil du Statut de la Femme.
- Bonenfant, Claire (1980). Réflexion sur la situation financière des femmes à la retraite (Report) (in French). Quebec(Prov.): Conseil du Statut de la Femme.
- Bonenfant, Claire (1980). L'Égalité en emploi: un rêve impossible? (Report) (in French). Quebec(Prov.): Conseil du Statut de la Femme.
- Bonenfant, Claire (1981). Le Sexisme n'est pas un jeu d'enfant (Report) (in French). Quebec(Prov.): Conseil du Statut de la Femme.
- Bonenfant, Claire (1981). L'Éducation des adultes est discriminatoire à l'endroit des femmes (Report) (in French). Quebec(Prov.): Conseil du Statut de la Femme.
