= Hiawatha Shelby =

American baseball player

- Outfielder
- Born: November 10, 1921; Indianapolis, Indiana
- Died: September 19, 1996 (aged 74); Indianapolis, Indiana
- Batted: Right Threw: Right

Negro league baseball debut
- 1941, for the Philadelphia Stars

Last appearance
- 1941, for the Philadelphia Stars
- Stats at Baseball Reference

Teams
- Philadelphia Stars (1941)

Hiawatha Lavern Shelby (November 10, 1921 – September 19, 1996) was an American Negro league outfielder in the 1940s.

A native of Indianapolis, Indiana, Shelby played for the Philadelphia Stars in 1941. In eight recorded games, he posted one hit and one RBI in 28 plate appearances. Shelby died in Indianapolis in 1996 at age 74.
