= Darío Espina Pérez =

Cuban banker, agricultural engineer and lawyer

- Born: October 25, 1920; Limonar, Matanzas, Cuba
- Died: September 6, 1996 (aged 75); Miami, Florida
- Education: University of Havana
- Occupations: Banker, agricultural engineer, lawyer, writer
- Spouse: Hilda Díaz Espina
- Children: Hilda Tejero; Darío M. Espina; Carlos Espina
- Awards: Premio Garcilaso de la Vega (1995)

Darío Espina Pérez (October 25, 1920 – September 6, 1996) was a Cuban banker, agricultural engineer, lawyer, writer, and the founder and president of La Academia Poética de Miami, a literary society established in 1989.

== Biography ==
Pérez was born in Limonar, Matanzas, Cuba, on October 25, 1920, to a family dedicated to beekeeping, Espina went on to author nearly forty technical and literary books and to co-author several more, all edited in collaboration with his wife, Hilda Díaz Espina. His writing received a number of awards, including the Premio Garcilaso de la Vega in 1995, given by the Instituto de Cultura Peruana for his poem La Naturaleza. In 1995 Espina was recognized as the teacher of the decade by the Cuadratura del Círculo Poético Iberoamericano in commemoration of the 100th anniversary of the death of José Martí.

He received his elementary education in public schools and through exams received a scholarship from the Ministry of Agriculture to study to become an agricultural sciences teacher in the Álvaro Reynoso Principal Agricultural School in Colón, Cuba. After earning a bachelor of science degree, he attended the Faculty of Agricultural Engineering at the University of Havana, where he graduated with the degree of Agricultural Engineer in Sugar Chemistry. He later returned to the University of Havana to earn his law degree.

Espina's activities in Cuba were centered on the banking and agriculture industries. He was part of the accounting department at the Banco Continental Cubano, chief of construction for the Public Works Ministry's "Via Blanca" project, a math professor at the Álvaro Reynoso Provincial Agricultural School, and an inspector at the Provincial Schools of Agriculture; he also held various posts at the Banco de Fomento Agricola e Industrial, was consultant and deputy administrator at the Banco Núñez in Havana, manager of a branch of the Banco de la Construcción, professor and Dean of the Faculty of Agricultural Engineers of the University of Havana, professor in the Faculty of Law of the University of Pinar del Río, chief of the appraisal department at the National Institute of Agrarian Reform in 1959, and, finally, officer of the Banco Nacional de Cuba until he left Cuba in 1961 during a scientific congress in Spain.

In 1961, Espina was granted asylum in the United States. Outside of Cuba, Espina continued to be an active professional through his position beginning in 1962 as sector specialist, consultant, and project manager with the Interamerican Development Bank (IDB) in Washington, D.C. Espina worked and lived in various countries in Latin America, including Honduras, the Dominican Republic, Venezuela, Ecuador, Haiti, and Costa Rica.

In 1981, Espina retired from the IDB and settled in Miami, Florida, with his wife, lawyer Hilda Díaz Espina, and their three children, physicians Hilda Tejero and Darío M. Espina and management and information technology specialist Carlos Espina. He died in Miami on September 6, 1996.

== Works or publications ==
- 107 poetas cubanos del exilio. Miami, Fl.: Antología Poética Hispanoamericana. 1988. OCLC 25073212.
- A sangre y fuego. San José, Costa Rica: LIL. 1981. OCLC 7421553.
- Alma de Haiti : leyendas, narraciones y fantasías. Sevilla (España): Editorial Católica Española. 1978. OCLC 6983811.
- Antología de la décima. Miami, FL: Antología Poética Hispanoamericana. 1986. OCLC 14407115.
- Apicultura tropical. Cartago, Costa Rica: Editorial Tecnológica de Costa Rica. 1983. OCLC 9953641.
- Beekeeping of the Assassin Bees. Cartago: Editorial Technológica de Costa Rica. 1986. OCLC 16947235.
- Biografía lírica de José Martí. Miami, Fla.: Antología Poética Hispanoamericana. c. 1987. OCLC 16163047.
- Diccionario de cubanismos. Barcelona: Imp. M. Pareja. 1972. OCLC 825430.
- Diccionario de sinónimos hispanoamericanos. Caracas: [publisher not identified]. 1969. OCLC 1739308.
- Diccionario de sinónimos hispanoamericanos, con un apéndice sobre algunos vicios de dicción, pleonasmos y americanismos. Caracas: [publisher not identified]. 1969. OCLC 3651640.
- Fabulario y rimas zoológicas : espinelas. Miami, Fla.: D. Espina Pérez. 1983. OCLC 9729730.
- Guitarras del exilio cubano. Miami, Fla.: La Academia. 1995. OCLC 34464107.
- La apicultura en los trópicos. México: B. Trucco. 1966. OCLC 3116778.
- Mecánica del verso y de la estrofa. Miami, Fla.: Academia Poética de Miami. 1997. OCLC 37434336.
- Poemario de historia universal. Miami, FL.: Editorial Hispania. 1983. OCLC 9955658.
- Politemas : cuentos, anécdotas, narraciones, poética. San José, Costa Rica: LIL. 1986. OCLC 17974766.
- Refranero poético : décimas. Miami, FL: [publisher not identified]. 1984. OCLC 11803423.
- Sabiduría de los refranes. Miami, FL.: [publisher not identified]. 1991. OCLC 25070108.
- Sonetario y Romancero. Santa Domingo, República Dominicana: Editora Corripio, C. por A. 1991. OCLC 25113271.
- Temas literarios. San José, Costa Rica: LIL. 1986. OCLC 16374427.
- Flora apícola tropical. Cartago, Costa Rica: Editorial Tecnológica de Costa Rica. 1983. OCLC 11502328.
- Cuba heróica. Miami, Fl.: Academia Poética de Miami. 1993. OCLC 30419751.
- Sugerencias sobre la reconstrucción de Cuba. Miami, Fla.: [D. Espina Pérez]. 1993. OCLC 43265004.
- Ficciones y realidades. [Costa Rica?]: [publisher not identified]. 1989. OCLC 21930193.
- Solucionática. Miami, Fla.: [publisher not identified]. 1991. OCLC 25492678.
- La mujer vista por un poeta. Miami, Fla.: Academia Poética de Miami. 1995. OCLC 32328281.
- Sonetario cubano. Miami, Fla.: Academia Poetica de Miami. 1992. OCLC 25857185.
- Lírica del exilio cubano. Miami, Fl.: Academia Poética de Miami. 1994. OCLC 30018044.
- Cuba, la cercana lejania. La Plata, Buenos Aires, Argentina: Editor Interamericano. 1995. OCLC 33888291.
- Las abejas y sus productos. México: Bartolome Trucco. 1960. OCLC 24146389.
- Poetas cubanos. [San José?]: [Antología Poética Hispanoamericana]. 1984. OCLC 659532012.
- Antología de poetas cubanos. 1989.
- Minilexikon. 1995.
- Antología poética hispanoameriana. 1983.
- Antología poética hispanoamericana, vol. 2. 1984.
- Gaceta lírica. 1996.
- Forum de Miami, v. 2. 1996.
- Varios conceptos sobre la Cuba del Futuro. 1992.
- Guerra de la triple alianza. 1981.

== Awards and recognitions ==
- Víctor M. Peraza award, 1948
- Municipio de Guamacaro en el Exilio, 1989
- Premio Primer Poeta Épico, 1992
- Premio Carlos Márquez-Sterling, 1992
- Premio Alvaro Reynoso, 1992
- Premio Certamen Poético García Lorca, 1995
- Premio Instituto de Cultura Peruana, 1995
- Premio Garcilaso de la Vega, 1995
