= Philip Kedward =

English cricketer (1909–1996)

Personal information
- Full name: Philip Morris Kedward
- Born: 26 July 1909; Hull, Yorkshire, England
- Died: 3 September 1996 (aged 87); Willesborough, Kent, England
- Batting: Right-handed
- Bowling: Right-arm medium

Career statistics
Competition	First-class
Matches	1
Runs scored	0
Batting average	0.00
100s/50s	–/–
Top score	0
Catches/stumpings	–/–
- Source: Cricinfo, 25 July 2019

Philip Morris Kedward (26 July 1909 – 3 September 1996) was an English first-class cricketer.

Kedward, who was born at Hull in July 1909, made a single appearance in first-class cricket for H. D. G. Leveson-Gower's XI against Oxford University at Reigate in 1935. Batting once in the match, he was dismissed without scoring in the HDG Leveson-Gower's XI first-innings by Tristan Ballance. He died in September 1996 at Willesborough, Kent.
