= Dick Kennedy =

Australian rules footballer

Personal information
- Full name: Richard Lawrence Kennedy
- Born: 12 September 1925
- Died: 25 September 1996 (aged 71)
- Original team: Hawthorn Thirds
- Height: 180 cm (5 ft 11 in)
- Weight: 79 kg (174 lb)
- Position: Half-forward

Playing career^{1}
Years	Club	Games (Goals)
1945–46	Melbourne	13 (11)
1947–51	Fitzroy	63 (47)
1953	Sorrento	
Total		76 (58)
- ^{1} Playing statistics correct to the end of 1951.

Richard Lawrence Kennedy (12 September 1925 – 25 September 1996) was an Australian rules footballer who played with Melbourne and Fitzroy in the Victorian Football League (VFL).
