= Georgios Vafopoulos =

Greek writer and poet (1903–1996)

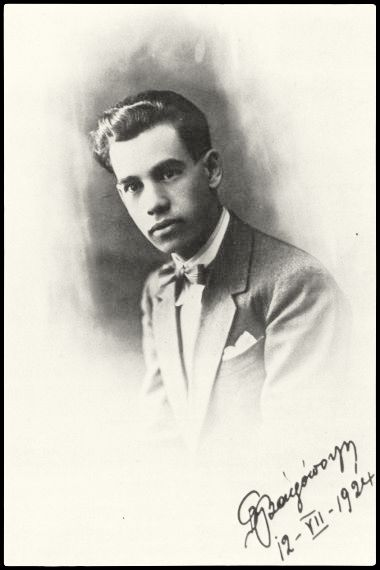
- Vafopoulos in 1924
- Born: 6 September 1903; Gevgelija, Ottoman Empire (now Gevgelija, North Macedonia)
- Died: 15 September 1996 (aged 93); Thessaloniki, Greece
- Education: University of Athens, Aristotelian University
- Occupations: Poet, author, journalist and teacher
- Spouses: Anthoula Stathopoulou-Vafopoulou (1932–1935); Anastasia Gerakopoulou (1946–1996)

Georgios Vafopoulos (Greek: Γεώργιος Βαφόπουλος; 6 September 1903 – 15 September 1996) was a Greek poet, author, teacher, and journalist.

== Biography ==
=== Early years ===
Vafopoulos was born on 6 September 1903 in Gevgelija, then Ottoman Empire (now North Macedonia). After the Second Balkan War, he settled in Edessa, in Fano of Kilkis, in Goumenissa and finally in Thessaloniki. In 1923 he moved to Athens, where he was enrolled in the Mathematic School of the University of Athens, but his studies got cancelled at the beginning of 1924 as he suffered from tuberculosis. Then, he returned to Thessaloniki, and together with Kostas Kokkinos, they ran the management of the magazine Makedonika Grammata (Μακεδονικά Γράμματα).

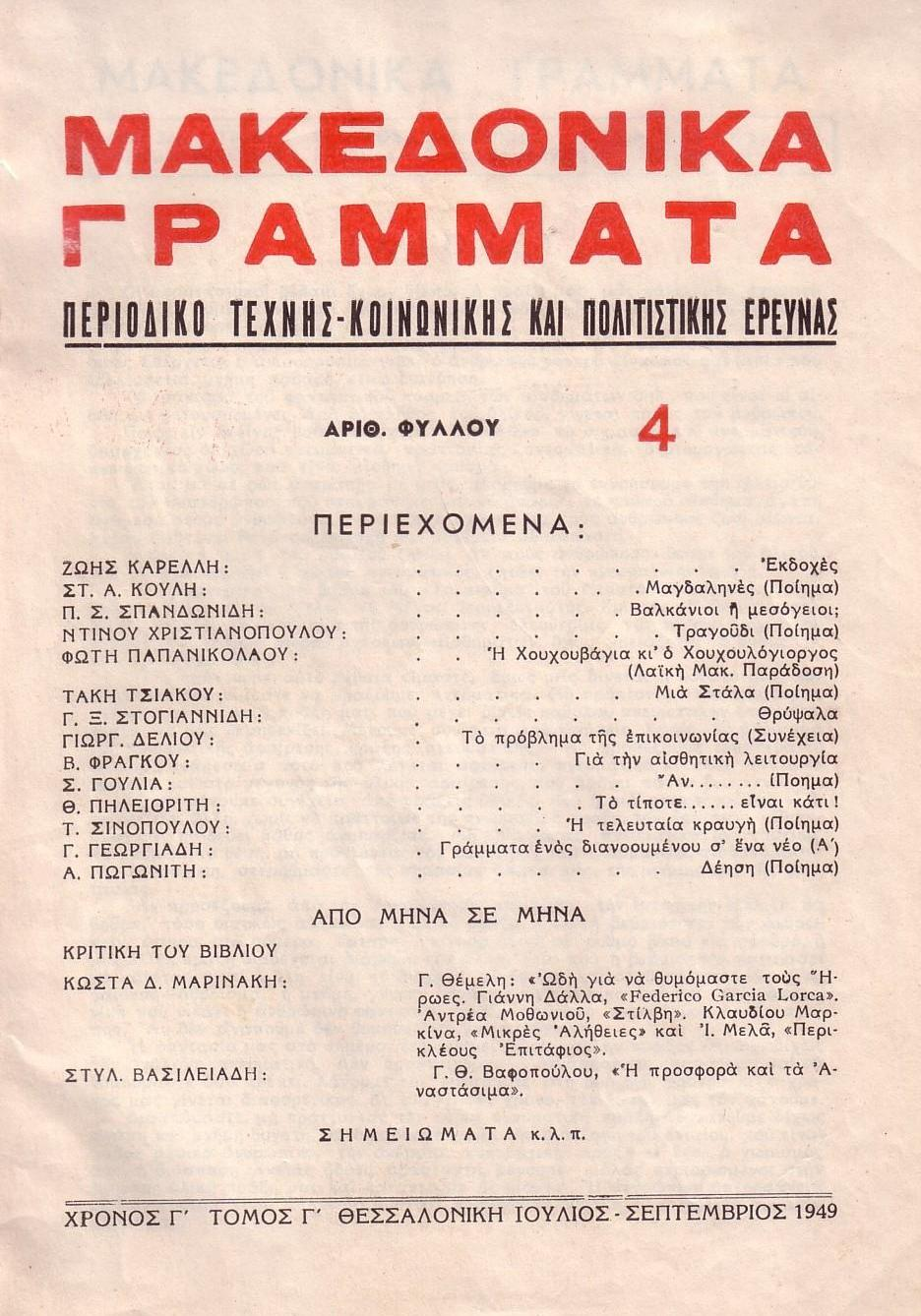
First page of the "Makedonika Grammata" literary magazine, published in 1949

From then, he started collaborating with magazines and newspapers, in which his poems, writings and articles were published. He was also the first and most notable donator of the up-coming Municipal Library of Thessaloniki.

=== Later years ===
He served as the library manager from its foundation in 1939 until 1963, with some compulsory pauses, most notably during the German occupation of Greece. He was also a member of the editorial team of the literature magazine "Makedonikes Imeres" (Μακεδονικές Ημέρες). He was the Secretary General of the First State Theater of Thessaloniki (1944) and a member of the Board of Directors of the State Theater of Northern Greece (1964-1967). He was also a teacher at the Aristotle University of Thessaloniki in the 1990s. He received many literary prizes, from the Academy of Athens, from the municipality of Thessaloniki, as well as from several literary societies and organizations.

== Personal life and travels ==
In 1924, he met with Thessalonian poet and playwright Anthoula Stathopoulou, whom he married in 1931. In the same year, he traveled to Mount Athos. In 1935, his wife died of tuberculosis. In 1938, he traveled to Italy, France, and Switzerland. In the same year he met Anastasia Gerakopoulou, whom he married in 1946. In 1951, he traveled to England, where he visited the British Library. In 1955 he travelled to his hometown, Gevgelija, then a part of Yugoslavia, where he visited his grandfather's grave. From then until 1974 he traveled to many countries, United States, Austria, Romania, Belgium, Germany, the Netherlands, Italy, Spain and finally Cyprus. That same year he suffered a severe heart attack.

He died on September 15, 1996, after a two-month hospitalization in a clinic of Thessaloniki, at the age of 93.

== Works ==
Some of his works are the following:

- Τα ρόδα της Μυρτάλης, 1931
- Εσθήρ. Έμμετρη βιβλική τραγωδία, 1934
- Η Μεγάλη Νύχτα και το Παράθυρο, 1959
- Eπιθανάτια και Σάτιρες, 1966
- Tα Eπιγενόμενα, 1966
- Σελίδες αυτοβιογραφίας, 1970-1975 (4 volumes)
