= Anthoula Stathopoulou-Vafopoulou =

Greek poet and playwright

April 16, 1935
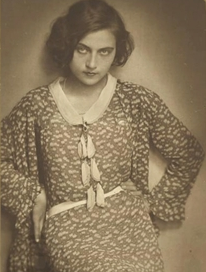
- Anthoula Stathopoulou-Vafopoulou as a teenager in 1924
- Born: 1908
- Died: April 16, 1935 (aged 26)
- Occupations: Poet and playwright
- Spouse: Georgios Vafopoulos (1931–1935)
- Writing career
- Notable work: Sleepless Nights (Greek: Νύχτες αγρύπνιας)

Anthoula Stathopoulou-Vafopoulou (Greek: Ανθούλα Σταθοπούλου-Βαφοπούλου; 1908 – April 16, 1935) was a Greek poet and playwright of the interwar period.

== Biography ==
Anthoula Stathopoulou was born in Thessaloniki, Greece, in 1908. In her youth she attended the city's High School for Girls and its French School. In 1924, at only 15 years old, she met the poet Georgios Vafopoulos, then in his early 20s. The two would marry later, in 1931, when they were 22 and 28. It was then that she took on the surname Stathopoulou-Vafopoulou.

Stathopoulou-Vafopoulou worked for a short period at the Thessaloniki City Hall, then became interested in the theater and attended the School of Dramatic Arts at the State Conservatory of Thessaloniki.

She began writing poetry and plays, which she published in literary magazines in Thessaloniki (such as Makedonikes Imeres) and Athens (such as Nea Estia). Her plays were performed at the School of Dramatic Arts, under the direction of Takis Mouzenidis. In 1932, she published her first and only book of poems, titled Sleepless Nights (Greek: Νύχτες αγρύπνιας).

In 1935, Stathopoulou-Vafopoulou died of tuberculosis, like her poetic contemporaries Maria Polydouri and Minos Zotos, at only 26 years old. She spent her final months at the sanatorium in Asvestochori.

Shortly after her death, the poet Tellos Agras published a review of her book of poetry in Nea Estia. Her husband collected her writings the following year in a volume titled Works (Greek: Έργα), with a prologue by Gregorios Xenopoulos. It was reviewed in Nea Estia by Cleon Paraschos.

In the 1940s, the songwriter Vassilis Tsitsanis honored her by borrowing from her writing in one of his pieces. A play based on her life and death was produced in Greece in 2024.

== Works ==
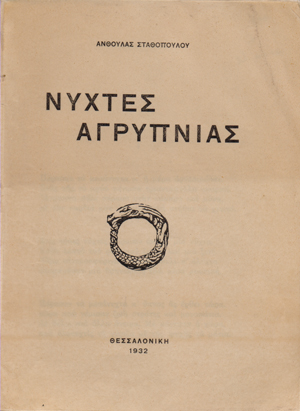
The title page of Sleepless Nights

=== Poetry ===
- Sleepless Nights [Νύχτες αγρύπνιας] (1932)

In its 55 poems, this collection radiates sensitivity, the sensation of sleeping awake and the poet's romantic sorrow. In its lyricism, using rhetorical questions and similes, the work conveys a great emotional weight to the reader.

Some scholars have characterized her writing as "post-symbolic."

=== Complete works ===
- Works [Έργα· Ποιήματα – Διηγήματα - Δράματα] (1936)
