= Robin Hanley =

English cricketer (1968–1996)

- Born: 5 January 1968; Tonbridge
- Died: 12 September 1996 (aged 28)
- Occupation: first-class cricketer

Robin Hanley (5 January 1968 – 12 September 1996) was an English first-class cricketer. He was born on 5 January 1968 in Tonbridge, Kent and died on 12 September 1996 at the age of 28. He played five first-class and three List A limited overs games for Sussex as a right-handed batsman, over three seasons from 1990 to 1992. His death was caused by a fall from his fourth-floor hotel room.
