= Sabine Zlatin =

French Jewish resistance fighter and painter

Zlatin in 1987

Sabine Zlatin (13 January 1907 – 21 September 1996) was a Polish-born Jewish Frenchwoman who hid Jewish children during World War II.

== Life ==
Zlatin was born Sabine Chwast in a Jewish family in Warsaw. As a young woman she moved to France, where she married Miron Zlatin. With him she ran a poultry farm in Landas in the north of France. Both received French citizenship in 1939.

Sabine Chwast was the last of twelve children. The father was an architect. He did not like the name given to his daughter, and decided to call her Yanka, a name she kept thereafter. Sabine could not abide the stifling home environment or the widespread anti-Semitism in Poland, so she decided in the mid-1920s to leave her homeland. Through her studies, she moved successively, to Danzig, Koenigsberg, Berlin, Brussels and finally arrived in Nancy, France, where she began studying art history. She met a young Jewish student from Russia, Miron Zlatin who was preparing a graduate degree in Agricultural University of Nancy. They were married July 31, 1927. The couple had no children. In 1929, Miron and Sabine acquired a poultry farm currently rue Miron-Zlatin to Landas in the North. After some difficulties, the operation proved a success. They were naturalized July 26, 1939.

After the outbreak of World War II, Sabine Zlatin began to train with the Red Cross. When the Germans advanced into France, the Zlatins moved to Montpellier, where Sabine Zlatin was posted to a military hospital. After the formation of the Vichy France government in 1941, she was forced to leave.

At the Hérault prefecture in the French-occupied zone, she contacted OSE, a charity for Jewish children. She helped to secure the release of children who had been interned in the camps at Agde and Rivesaltes.

When the Germans occupied the rest of the France in 1943, Zlatin took 17 children with her to the Italian-occupied zone. Through the recommendation of the sub-prefect of Belley, she received permission to use a house in Izieu, 60 miles from Lyon in the Rhône Valley, and founded the Hérault refugee children's home La Maison d'Izieu ("Children's Home of Izieu), where Jewish children were hidden.

However, on 6 April 1944, the Lyon Gestapo, led by Klaus Barbie, raided the house and took away all 44 of the children and the seven adults who were taking care of them. Zlatin herself was elsewhere at the time. Forty-two of the children and five of the adults were gassed at the Auschwitz concentration camp, while two of the teenage children and the home superintendent, Miron Zlatin, were executed by firing squad at Reval in Estonia.

In 1987 Zlatin testified against Barbie in his war crimes trial. The same year she founded an association to create a museum for the Izieu victims. She received support from various sources, including from French president François Mitterrand. The museum opened on 4 April 1994 in the very house that she had used to try to protect the children.

== Books ==
- Serge Klarsfeld (1984) The Children of Izieu: a human tragedy; translated by Kenneth Jacobson. New York: Harry N. Abrams ISBN 0-8109-2307-6 (Translation of: Les enfants d'Izieu)
