= Jan Brooijmans =

Dutch footballer

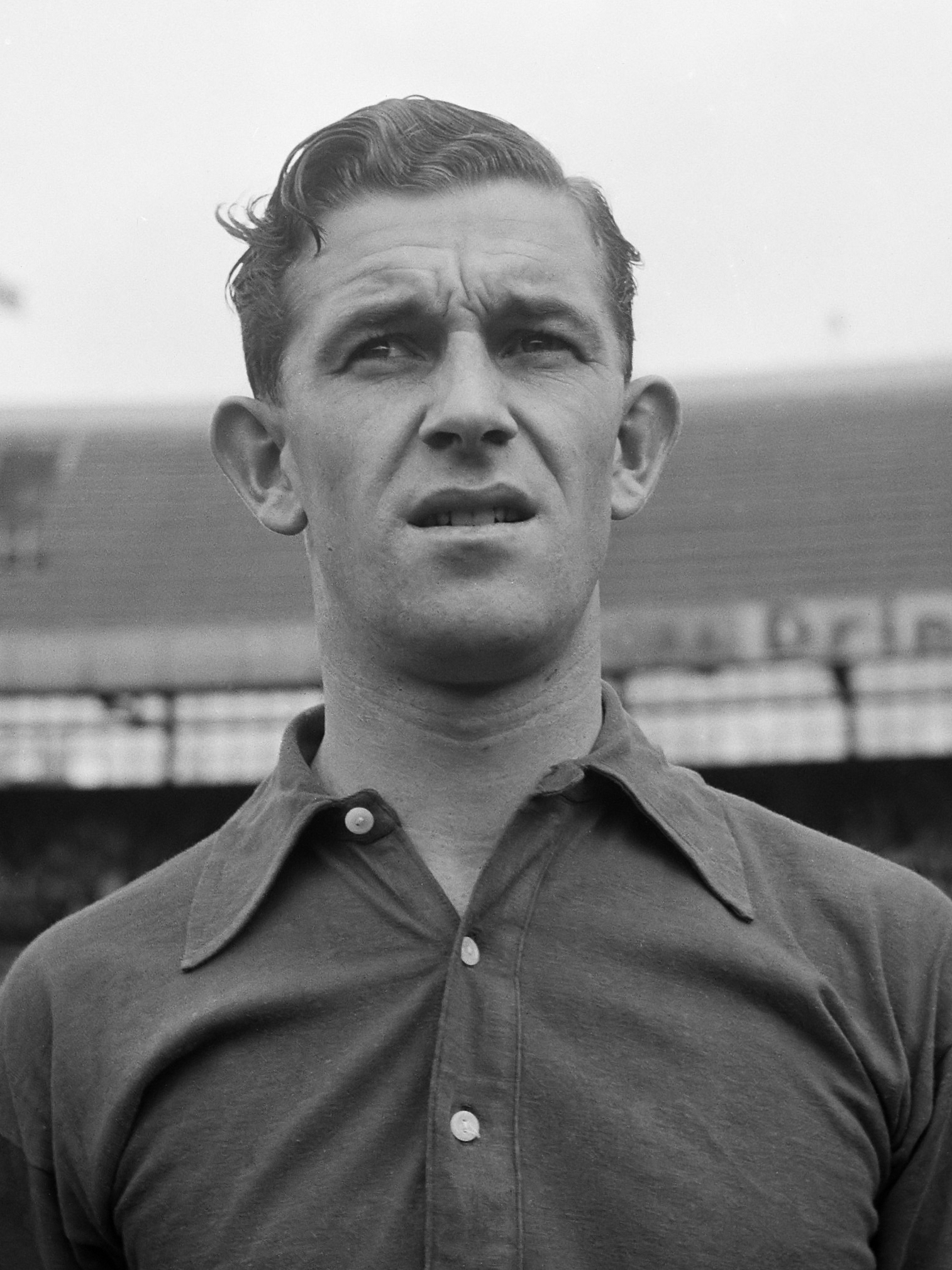

Personal information
- Full name: Johannes Cornelis Brooijmans
- Date of birth: 3 November 1929
- Place of birth: Molenschot, Netherlands
- Date of death: 13 September 1996 (aged 66)
- Place of death: Rijen, Netherlands
- Position: Defender

Senior career*
Years	Team	Apps	(Gls)
1956–1967	Willem II	313	(30)

International career
1955–1956	Netherlands	2	(0)
- * Club domestic league appearances and goals

Jan Brooijmans (3 November 1929 – 13 September 1996) was a Dutch footballer. He played in two matches for the Netherlands national football team from 1955 to 1956.

Nicknamed D´n Brooij, Brooijmans played his entire career for Willem II, skippering them to the 1963 KNVB Cup. He played 402 games for Willem II, a club record that was finally surpassed by John Feskens in 1996.
