= Napoleon Lapathiotis =

Greek poet

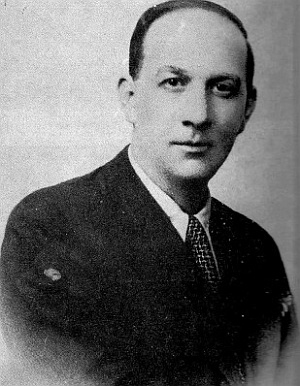
- Born: 31 October 1888; Athens, Greece
- Died: 7 January 1944 (aged 55); Athens, Greece
- Occupations: Poet, Author
- Writing career
- Genre: Poetry

Napoleon Lapathiotis (Greek: Ναπολέων Λαπαθιώτης; 31 October 1888 – 7 January 1944) was a Greek poet.

== Biography ==
Born in Athens, he began writing and publishing poetry when he was eleven. In 1907, along with others, he established the Igiso (Ἡγησώ) magazine, in which he published his works. In 1909, he graduated from the law school of the University of Athens. His only book of poems while alive was published in 1939; in 1964, Aris Diktaios published his poems posthumously.

Lapathiotis was openly gay and had communist beliefs. Poor in later life and an opium addict, he committed suicide with a revolver on 7 January 1944.

He died in Athens.

== Legacy ==
The 1985 film Meteor and Shadow was based on his life.

== Poems ==
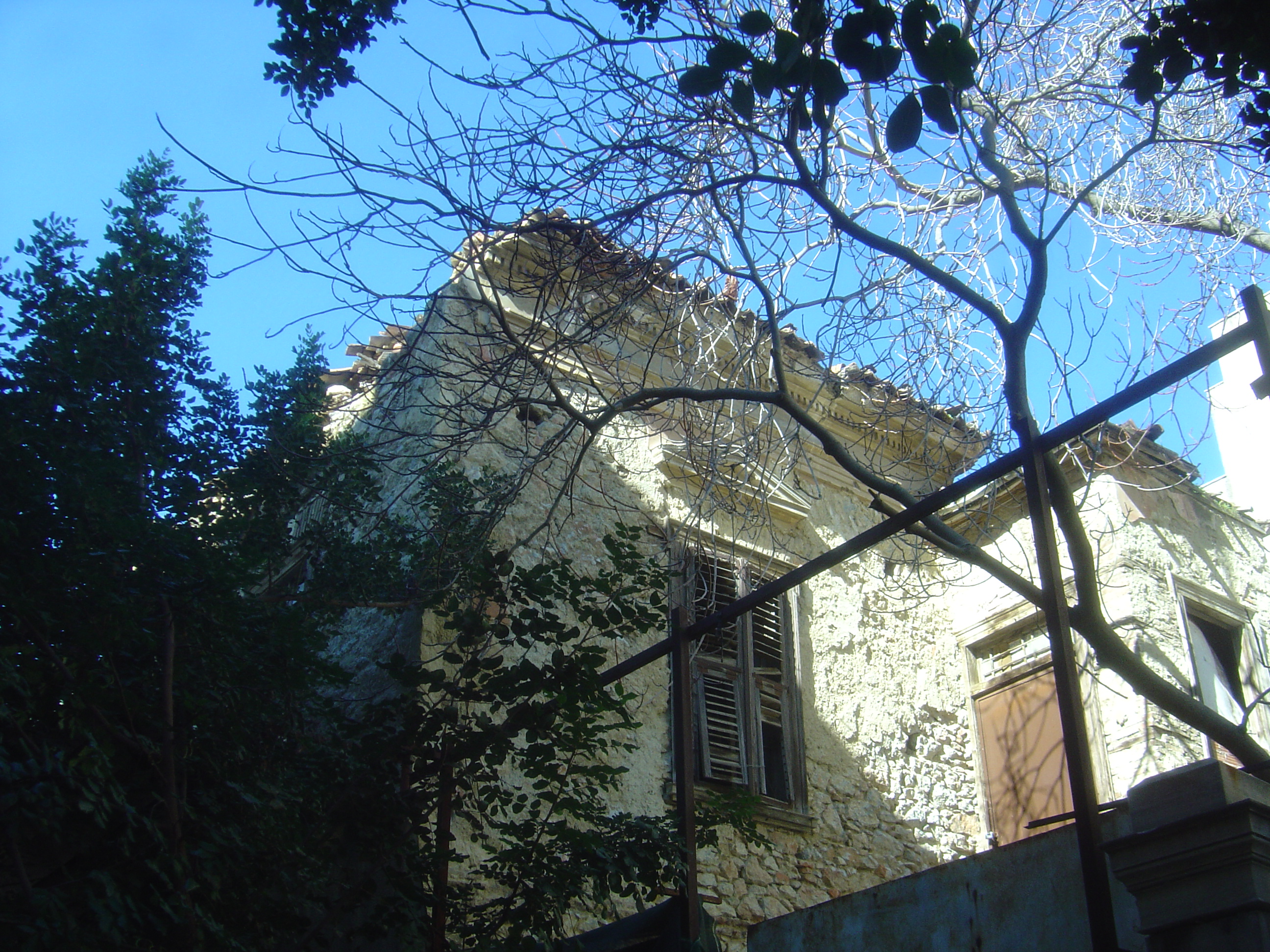
Lapathiotis house in Exarcheia

Famous poems by Lapathiotis include:

- Τὰ καημένα τὰ πουλάκια
- Τὰ χλωμά τὰ κοριτσάκια
- Ἔχω ἕνα ἀηδόνι...
- Ποιητής
- Μυστικό...
- Ἐπεισόδιο
- Ἡ χαρά
- Συντριβή
- Ἀναμνήσεις
- Our old song (Τὸ παλιό μας τραγοῦδι)
- Small song (Μικρὸ τραγοῦδι)
- Παραμύθι
- Πόθος
- Στὴ νυχτερινὸ κέντρο
- Χειμωνιάτικο τοπίο
- Ἐκ βαθέων
- Στὴ φυλακή...
- Κούραση
- Κλείσε τὰ παράθυρα
- Φαντάσματα
- Βαθύ κι ἐξαίσιο βράδυ
- Μοναξιά
- Ἑκάτης πάθη
- Νυχτερινό
- Οἱ μπερντέδες
- Ἐρωτικό
- Οἱ κύκνοι τὸ φθινόπωρο
- Λυπήσου
- Προσμένω πάλι
- Σπαρασμός
- Untitled (Ἄτιτλο)
- 1939
- Φάντασμα
- Προσμονή
- Εἶμαι μόνος...
- Ἐρινύες
- Vao, ghao, dhao (Βαο, γαο, δαο)
- Τ᾿ ἁπλὸ παιδί πού ἐγὼ ἀγαπῶ...
- Song (Τραγούδι)
- Ὅταν βραδιάζει
- Ἕνας χαμένος κύκλος
- Ἀποχαιρετισμοί στη μουσική
- Ἀποχαιρετισμός
- Ἀποχαιρετιστήριο
- Κραυγή

== Other works ==
- My Life (Ἡ Ζωή μου), unfinished autobiography
- Nero the tyrant (Νέρων ὁ Τύραννος), 1901, theatrical play for children
