= Charles Kenny (cricketer) =

English cricketer

- Charles Kenny at Cambridge in 1952

Personal information
- Full name: Charles John Michael Kenny
- Born: 19 May 1929; Wallington, Surrey, England
- Died: 9 September 1996 (aged 67); Chiddingfold, Surrey
- Batting: Right-handed
- Bowling: Right-arm fast-medium

Domestic team information
- Years: Team
- 1950–1953: Essex
- 1952: Cambridge University

Career statistics
Competition	First-class
Matches	40
Runs scored	75
Batting average	3.40
100s/50s	0/0
Top score	16
Balls bowled	3348
Wickets	117
Bowling average	28.61
5 wickets in innings	6
10 wickets in match	1
Best bowling	7/45
Catches/stumpings	17/0
- Source: Cricinfo, 16 April 2015

Charles John Michael Kenny (19 May 1929 – 9 September 1996) was an English cricketer active from 1950 to 1962 who played for Cambridge University and Essex.

Kenny was born in Wallington, Surrey and died in Chiddingfold. He appeared in 40 first-class matches as a right arm fast medium bowler who batted right-handed in the tail. He took 117 wickets with a best performance of seven for 45, and scored 75 runs with a highest score of 16.
