= Kokkinia, Grevena =

Kokkinia Κοκκινιά
- Community
- Location within Greece
- Coordinates: 40°12.5′N 21°29.1′E
- Country: Greece
- Administrative region: Western Macedonia
- Regional unit: Grevena
- Municipality: Grevena
- Municipal unit: Irakleotes

Area
  - Community: 16.28 km^{2} (6.29 sq mi)
- Elevation: 669 m (2,195 ft)

Population (2021)
  - Community: 136
  - Density: 8.35/km^{2} (21.6/sq mi)
- Time zone: UTC+2 (EET)
  - Summer (DST): UTC+3 (EEST)
- Postal code: 510 30
- Area code: +30-2462
- Vehicle registration: PN

Kokkinia (Greek: Κοκκινιά, before 1927: Σούμπινο – Soumpino) is a village and a community of the Grevena municipality. Before the 2011 local government reform it was a part of the municipality of Irakleotes, of which it was a municipal district. The 2021 census recorded 136 residents in the community. The community of Kokkinia covers an area of 16.28 km^{2}.

Soumpino was a mixed village and a part of its population were Greek speaking Muslim Vallahades. The 1920 Greek census recorded 459 people in the village, and 200 inhabitants (50 families) were Muslim in 1923.

Following the Greek–Turkish population exchange, Greek refugee families in Soumpino were from Asia Minor (10) and Pontus (43) in 1926. The 1928 Greek census recorded 573 village inhabitants. In 1928, the refugee families numbered 52 (185 people). Nea Trapezounta, a neighbourhood of Kokkinia populated by Greek refugees was listed as a separate new village in the 1981 census.

== Administrative division ==
The community of Kokkinia consists of two separate settlements:

- Kokkinia (population 125 as of 2021)
- Nea Trapezounta (population 11)

== See also ==
- List of settlements in the Grevena regional unit
