= 2026 Canadian Honours =

Canadian government recognitions

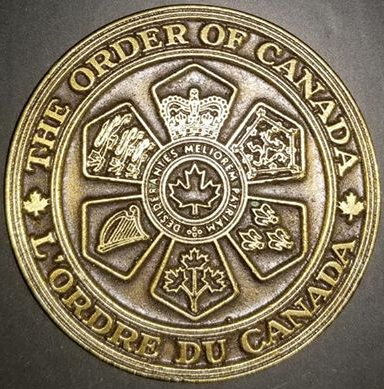
The Seal of the Order of Canada

The 2026 New Year Honours in Canada were appointments by Charles III in his right as King of Canada, on the advice of the Canadian government, to the Order of Canada to reward and highlight good works by Canadians, and to celebrate the passing of 2025 and the beginning of 2026.

However, as the Canada Gazette publishes appointment to various orders, decorations and medal, either Canadian or from Commonwealth and foreign states, this article will reference all Canadians so honoured during the 2026 calendar year.

Provincial Honours are not listed within the Canada Gazette, however they are listed within the various publications of each provincial government. Provincial honours are listed within the page.

The first appointments to the Order of Canada were announced on 31 December 2025.

The recipients of honours are listed here as they were styled before their new honour.

== Order of Canada ==
=== Companion (CC) ===
Undress ribbon of a Companion of the Order of Canada

- The Honourable Rosalie Silberman Abella FRSC – Former Puisne Justice, Supreme Court of Canada
- Simon Brault OC OQ – Director, Canada Council for the Arts
- Raffi Cavoukian CM OBC – Singer-Songwriter
- Dr Shaf Keshavjee OC OOnt – Thoracic Surgeon
- The Honourable Michael James Moldaver KC – Former Puisne Justice, Supreme Court of Canada
- Dr D. Lorne J. Tyrrell OC AOE FRSC – Physician

=== Officer (OC) ===
Undress ribbon of an Officer of the Order of Canada

- Dr John Cameron Bell – Oncologist and Researcher
- The Honourable Janice Charette PC – Former Clerk of the Privy Council and High Commissioner to the United Kingdom
- Bert Cecil Crowfoot – Journalist
- Dr Adele Diamond FRSC – Neuroscientist and Researcher
- Dr Janice J. Eng – Neurologist and Researcher
- Dr Judy Illes CM FRSC – Neurologist and Researcher
- Dr Praveen Jain – Inventor and CEO, Sparq Systems
- Dr Anne-Marie Mes-Masson FRSC – Molecular Oncologist and Researcher
- Dr J. Curtis Nickel FRCSC – Urologist and Researcher
- Mandy Rennehan – Businesswoman and TV Personality
- Dr Federico Rosei CQ – Scientist and Researcher
- Dr Roseann Runte CM FRSC – Former CEO, Canada Foundation for Innovation and President, Carleton University
- Dr Chandrakant Padamshi Shah OOnt – Physician and Social Activist
- Donald Lawrence Triggs – Businessman and Former CEO, Vincor International
- Dr Marina Andrea Graefin von Keyserlingk – Professor, University of British Columbia

=== Member (CM) ===
Undress ribbon for a Member of the Order of Canada

- Dr A. Peter Annan – Engineer and Founder, Sensors & Software
- Phyllis A. Arnold – Educator and Writer
- Stephen Beckta – Restaurateur
- Elsabeth Black ONS – Artistic Gymnast and Olympian
- Mark S. Bonham – Investment Manager and 2SLGBTQI+ Advocate
- Dr Kim Ruth Brooks – Academic and President, Dalhousie University
- Wayne Richard Brownlee SOM – Businessman and Former CFO, PotashCorp
- Rosanna Caira – Journalist; Editor and Publisher, Kostuch Media
- The Honourable Richard J. F. Chartier – Former Chief Justice of Manitoba
- Terri Clark – Country Music Singer
- Penny Collenette - Educator, Lawyer and Commentator
- Dr. Patrick Croskerry - Academic and Director of Critical Thinking Program, Dalhousie University
- Jane Darville - Executive Director of Toronto’s Casey House HIV/AIDS hospital and Executive Director of Vancouver’s Canuck Place Children's Hospice
- Andre De Grasse - Olympian in sprint events
- Mark Dobbin - Businessman and founder of Killick Capital Inc.
- Chris Dodd - Deaf performing artist, founder and artistic director of SOUND OFF
- Sheila Early - Forensic Nurse and Educator
- Mary Edwards - Founder and Volunteer Director of Niagara’s Rankin Cancer Run
- Kathleen Fox - Chair of Transportation Safety Board of Canada
- Michelle Good - Member of Red Pheasant Cree Nation, Advocate and Lawyer
- Elly Gotz - Holocaust survivor, Educator and Author
- Gerald Grandey - Former CEO of Cameco
- Reesa Greenberg - Art Historian
- Hans-Jurgen Greif - Academic and Author
- Dr. James Hathaway - Academic and Human Rights Advocate
- James Hewitt - Businessman and Philanthropist
- Charles Hopkins - Academic and UNESCO Chair of Reorienting Education Towards Sustainability
- Ian Ihor Orest Ihnatowycz - Businessman and founder of Ihnatowycz Family Foundation
- Dr. Eddy Issacs - Academic and past-leader of Alberta Innovates - Energy and Environmental Solutions
- Alfred Kwinter - Lawyer and past-Director of Advocates’ Society
- Gillian Kydd - Educator and co-founder of Open Minds/Beyond the Classroom Network
- Martha Langford - Art Historian
- Roger Lewis - Mi’kmaq Historian and Archeologist from the Sipekne’katik First Nation
- Dr. William Logan - Pediatric Neurologist and Academic
- Elizabeth MacLeod - Award-winning children’s Author
- Dr. Allison McGeer - Epidemiologist, Academic and Health Policy Advisor
- Irene McNeill - International Race Officer in Sailing and founder of LEAP program
- Rassi Nashalik - Inaugural host of CBC’s Igalaaq and advocate for Inuit language and culture
- Muzammal Nawaz - World Middleweight Champion in Kickboxing
- Pamela Newall - Forensic DNA Scientist and Expert Witness
- Brenda Okorogba - Educator - Honorary Appointment
- Patricia O’Malley - Chartered Accountant who developed International Financial Reporting Standards
- Brendan Paddick - Telecommunications Executive and co-founder of Dollar A Day Foundation
- Dr. Susan Phillips - Academic in non-profit and philanthropic studies, Carleton University
- Dr. Al-Amin Proton Rahman - Academic and creator of the Newfoundland Genealogy Database, Memorial University
- James Retallack - Academic Historian, University of Toronto
- Jean Robert - Educator and chair of the National Battlefields Commission
- Whitney Rockley - Venture Capitalist and co-founder of a McRock Capital
- Leonard Schein - Philanthropist and founder of Festival Cinemas, the Vancouver Film Festival and Alliance Atlantis Cinemas
- Walter and Maria Schroeder - Philanthropists and founders of The Schroeder Foundation
- Cindy Schwartz - Advocate and founder of Les Muses
- Nardwuar the Human Serviette - Music Journalist
- Karl Tomm - Academic, Pyschiatrist and founder of the Calgary Family Therapy Centre
- Ziya Tong - Science Journalist and Environmental Advocate
- Barry Truax - Composer, Educator and Author, Simon Fraser University
- Michael Jon Villeneuve - Nurse and CEO of the Canadian Nurses Association
- Dr. Della Wilkinson - Research Scientist in Forensic Identification
- Dr. John Willinsky - Educator, Researcher and founder of the Public Knowledge Project
