= BDP Quadrangle =

Canadian architecture and interior design firm

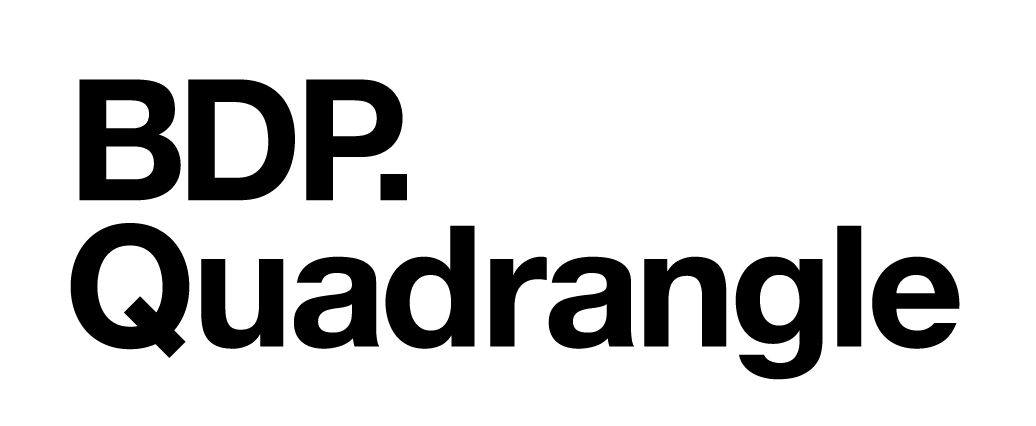
- Founded: 1986
- Founders: Brian Curtner and Les Klein
- Type: Architecture firm
- Headquarters: Toronto, Ontario, Canada
- Key people: Anna Madeira, Caroline Robbie, Jeff Hardy, Les Klein, Richard Witt, Sami Kazemi, Sheldon Levitt and Heather Rolleston
- Website: bdpquadrangle.com

BDP Quadrangle is the North American studio of UK-based global architecture, design, and urbanism firm, BDP.

== History ==
Quadrangle was founded in June 1986 as a merger between two firms, Klein Taylor Goldsmith and Curtner Brown Architects. The firm's four founding partners were Hugh Taylor, Philip Goldsmith, Brian Curtner, and Leslie M. Klein. What started as a small, closely held corporation grew into a multiple shareholder corporation over the years.

The firm gained recognition in 1987, after transforming a heritage building at 299 Queen Street West into the headquarters of the CHUM media brand. The building is now known as Bell Media Queen Street. In 2016, the building was awarded landmark designation by the Ontario Association of Architects (OAA).

In 2010, Quadrangle initiated a joint venture with the March of Dimes Canada called AccessAbility Advantage, which was established to create more accessible built environments. In 2018, Quadrangle decided to end this partnership with March of Dimes, and instead launched Human Space, a new brand that expanded its services in human centred design to include wellness and resilience in addition to accessibility.

In February 2019, Quadrangle joined BDP.

In November 2020, the firm changed its name to BDP Quadrangle.

== Specialties ==
Inclusivity, sustainability, and accessibility are important considerations for the firm.

The company has, since 1999, maintained female principals, and in 2019, Principal and Design Director Heather Rolleston joined Toronto's first all-female development team, which is composed of engineers, architects and urban planners.

In 2015 the company completed 100 Broadview, a commercial building for Hullmark that integrates universal design principles. The project received a silver award from the International Association for Universal Design.

Quadrangle designed accessible, family-sized condo suites for the Daniels Corporation's Artworks Tower, as part of the developer's Accessibility Designed Program (ADP), which was created in collaboration with Quadrangle and AccessAbility Advantage.

The firm led Ontario's experimentation with mass timber, through the design and construction of 80 Atlantic. In 2019, Michelle Xuereb, Director of Innovation, held a TED Talk on how architecture can help fight climate change at the 2019 TEDxToronto event held at the Evergreen Brickworks. In the same year, Quadrangle signed the Canadian Architectural Professionals Declare Planetary Health Emergency and Commit to Urgent and Sustained Action, a pledge to create and advocate for sustainable built environments.

== Housing ==
Quadrangle contributed significantly to Toronto's multi-unit residential housing market. In the early 90s, the firm developed an expertise in non-profit housing, with projects such as the Tatry and Pathways Non-Profit Housing complex, the first Canadian project to win a World Habitat Award from the United Nations. For Toronto's Condominium housing market, the firm created landmark buildings including The Morgan and the St. James Condominiums for Great Gulf Homes in 1998, which were designed as homages to their historic urban contexts.

Quadrangle also led the wave of Toronto factory-to-residential loft conversions with the early transformation of the Ce De Candy Company into the Candy Factory Lofts (1998) and later the conversion of Irwin Toys landmark building in Liberty Village into the Toy Factory Lofts (2007) for Lanterra Developments.

130 Bloor and 36 Hazelton were early examples of additions to existing heritage buildings, which were a different take on Toronto urban infill buildings. 130 Bloor won an RAIC Innovation Award for the structural complexity required to support the additional load of nine new floors of suites on top of a 1960s office building. 36 Hazelton tucked 21 apartments into a nine-storey addition behind the façade of the historic St. Basil's School in Yorkville.

The firm was an early proponent of the intensification of existing "towers in the park," by adding density to underused land and providing new housing, including purpose-built rental projects at 66 Isabella Street for Park Property Management and new condominiums at Plaza Midtown for Plazacorp.

In 2010, Quadrangle co-authored the City of Toronto's Mid-rise Guidelines, and subsequently completed several mid-rise projects such as Duke Condos for TAS Design-Build, which won a 2019 Toronto Urban Design Award.

The studio has advocated for a shift from glass and steel towers towards more sustainable alternatives that improve energy performance by measures such as increasing the window-to-wall ratio. The firm is presently working on Expo City 5 – CG Tower, a 551-unit condominium for the Cortel Group in the Vaughan Metropolitan area, which features a stepped brick-faced facade with a window-to-wall ratio of 43% in contrast to conventional glass-wall towers.

Through its master planning work, Quadrangle is designing large residential communities for Toronto including the Fort York Neighbourhood for Plazacorp and Downtown Markham for Remington Homes. These projects are establishing complete walkable communities in reclaimed industrial lands or in Suburban contexts.

== Notable projects ==
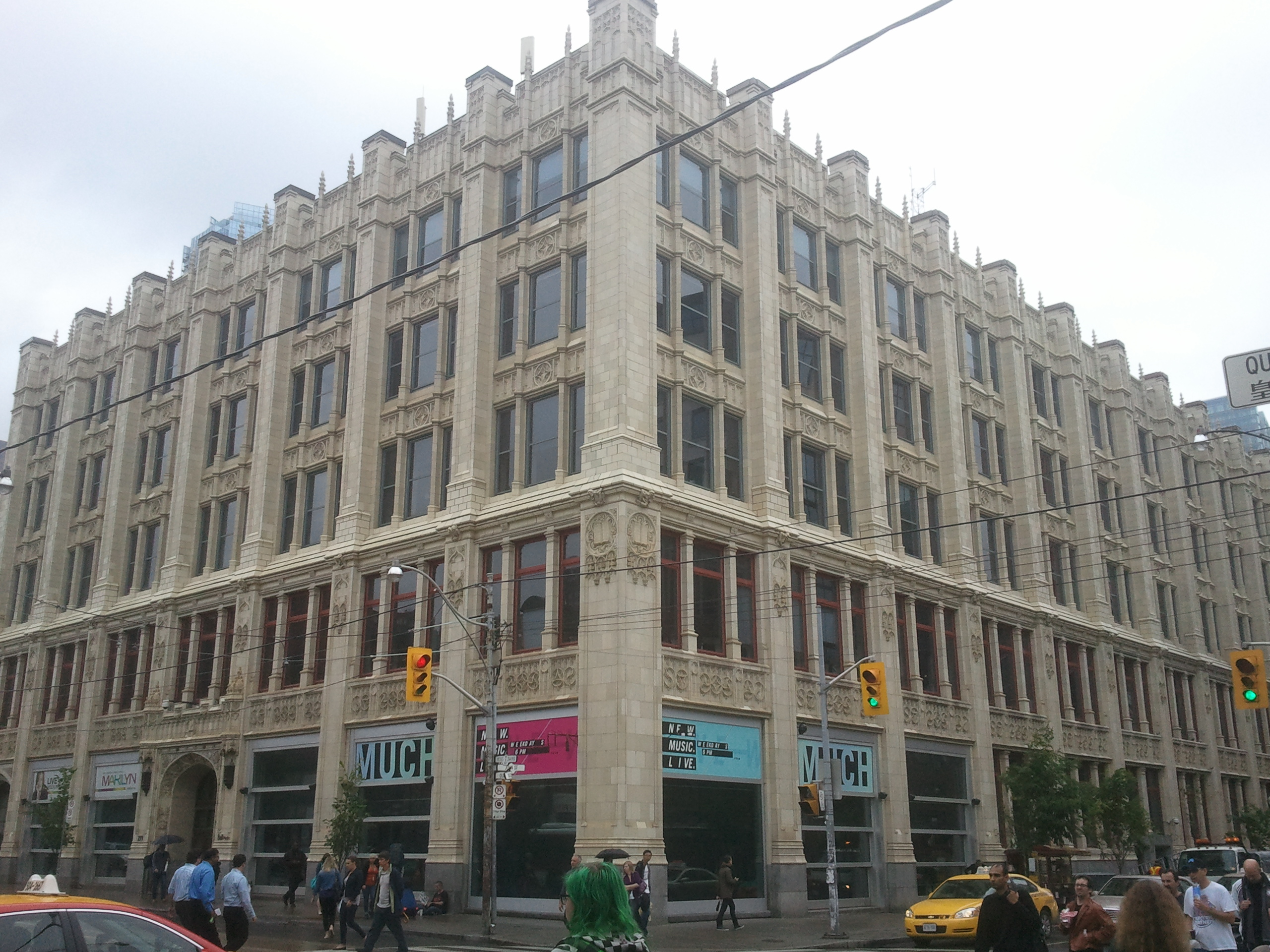
299 Queen Street West, 2004

=== 299 Queen Street West (1987, 2004) ===
299 Queen Street West is a neo-gothic heritage building with a terra-cotta facade that was purchased by television executive Moses Znaimer in 1985 as the headquarters of the media company CHUM. It is currently the headquarters of Bell Media. Quadrangle completed restoration and renovation work on the building in 1987 and 2004, transitioning the building into an innovative broadcast hub. To encourage the public to interact with the architecture, the firm added garage doors that exposed the studios and live tapings to the sidewalk and passersby. This move changed the media industry and became a model for other broadcasters in North America. Today, the building is considered a Toronto cultural landmark, having housed several local TV stations – including MuchMusic – and the Speaker's Corner video-booth. A news-truck, its wheels still rolling, protrudes through the unclad east wall. As the CHUM-City Building, it was "a buzzing sentient cathedral of good vibes, good music, and good people: 'The living movie' as it came to be known".

=== BMW Toronto (2004) ===
Overlooking Toronto's Don Valley Parkway, BMW Toronto is a retrofit of a 1950s office building into a car dealership completed in 2004. Led by Quadrangle architect Roland Rom Colthoff (now director at RAW Design) the building introduced a new typology for automotive showrooms. Wrapped in glass on three sides, the exterior houses BMW cars in six display windows that are visible to passing motorists on the highway. Reviewing the project, Canadian Architect editor Ian Chodikoff wrote, "the juxtaposition of an unabashedly extroverted building adjacent to a high-speed corridor collides the image of BMW as 'an ultimate driving machine' into one that has become an ultimate branding machine." The project won an Urban Design Award from the City of Toronto, a National Post Design Exchange Award, and an OAA Award of Excellence.

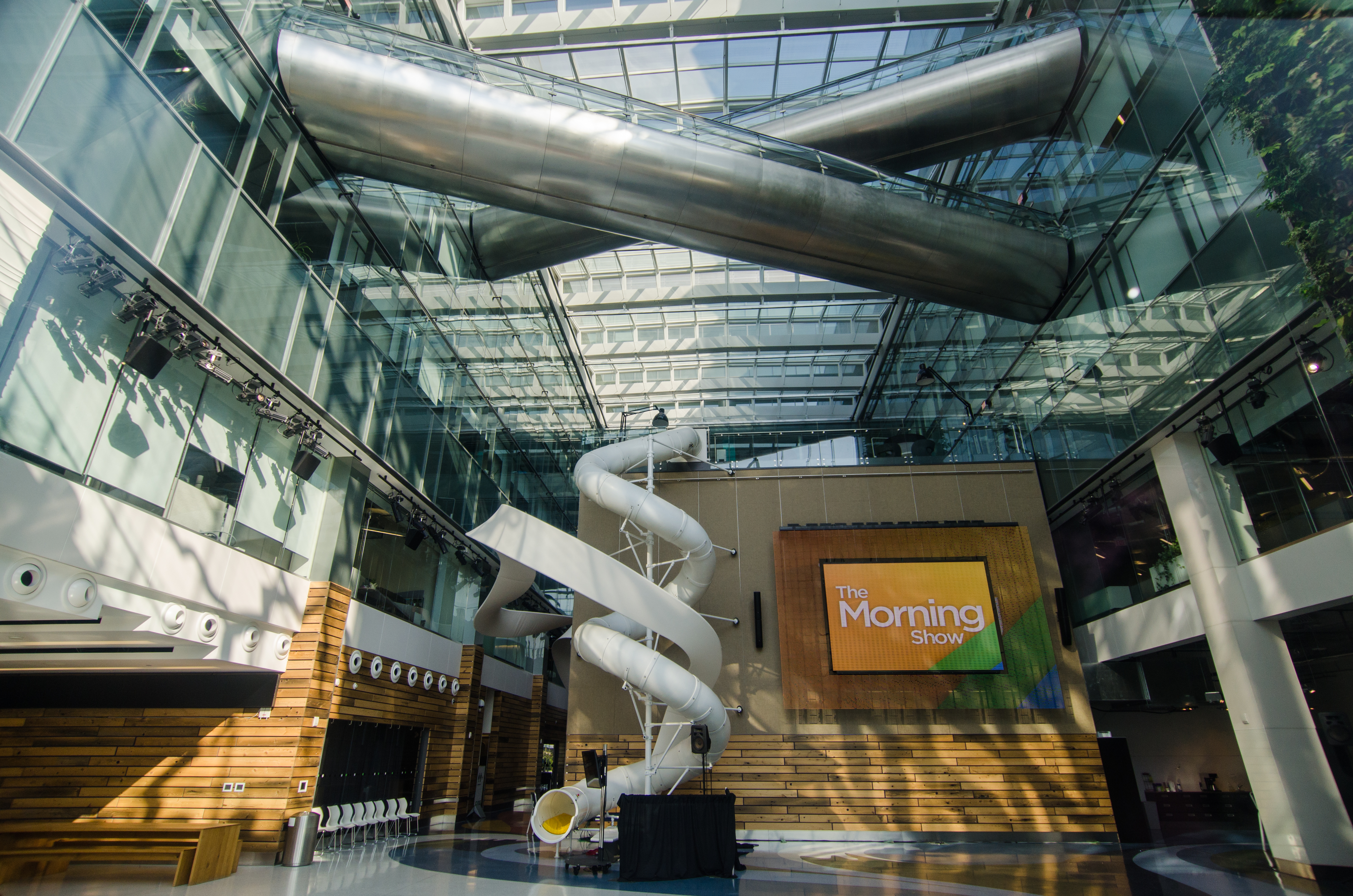
Inside the Corus Entertainment headquarters, 2010

=== 130 Bloor Street West (2009) ===
A complex adaptive re-use project, Quadrangle was asked by KingSett Capital to both renovate and add a 7-storey condo on top of an existing 1960s 14-storey commercial building (by Bregman + Hamann, now B+H Architects) that is topped by the heritage-listed modernist Toronto Penthouse (restored and updated in 2012 by interior designer J.F. Brennan). The penthouse was the most expensive condo in Canada in 2005. Sited on top of a subway line and several commercial businesses, the firm was challenged to renovate and create the addition while keeping the existing infrastructure structurally sound and allowing transit and business operations to continue. Quadrangle's design for the condo apartments includes a series of syncopated "boxes" faced with limestone. The project won an RAIC Innovation in Architecture award in 2009.

=== Corus Entertainment (2010) ===
Corus Quay is the headquarters of Corus Entertainment, located on Toronto's waterfront. The office building was first commissioned by Toronto Port Lands Company which soon became a "catalyst for the revitalization of Toronto’s Eastern Bayfront area." The building was designed by Diamond Schmitt Architects and Quadrangle was in charge of repurposing the building's 500,000 square foot interior into a workplace, broadcasting and media hub. The largely open plan interior "merges high design with casual comfort" through colourful meeting rooms and cubicles, radio booths, graffiti murals spread out across boardrooms, and a spiral slide that spans three storeys. Collaborative and communal gathering spaces are emphasized to provide a fun and creative working environment. Corus Quay has received two ARIDO Awards of Excellence in 2011 and has been "named one of the top 10 coolest places in the world to work, as well as one of the world’s most impressive offices."

=== Lululemon Yorkdale (2012) ===
This 3,000 square-foot Lululemon retail store located in Yorkdale Mall was a collaboration between Quadrangle, Lululemon store designer Emily Robin, and Toronto woodworkers Brothers Dressler. The facade is covered in a leaf-shaped mosaic composed by the Brothers Dressler from off-cuts of reclaimed wood. Unlike most retail stores located within malls, the wood mosaic, composed of 20 different species of wood, blocks views into the store. The design won an Ontario Wood Works! Award.

=== 60 Atlantic Avenue (2014) ===
60 Atlantic Avenue is an adaptive re-use project located in Toronto's Liberty Village neighbourhood that was completed in 2014. BDP Quadrangle renovated an 1898 former wine warehouse into a mixed-use commercial space for Hullmark Developments. Defined by a Corten steel and glass service core that bisects the original brick façade, the new design references the neighbourhood's industrial heritage. By excavating the site and adding an addition, Quadrangle created a new outdoor courtyard and walk-out lower level that could be leased by the developer to make the entire project economically feasible. 60 Atlantic received an AJ Retrofit Award from the UK for outstanding adaptive reuse, a Good Design is Good Business Award from Architectural Record in the US, and a Toronto Urban Design Award from the City of Toronto.

=== Samsung Experience Store (2017) ===
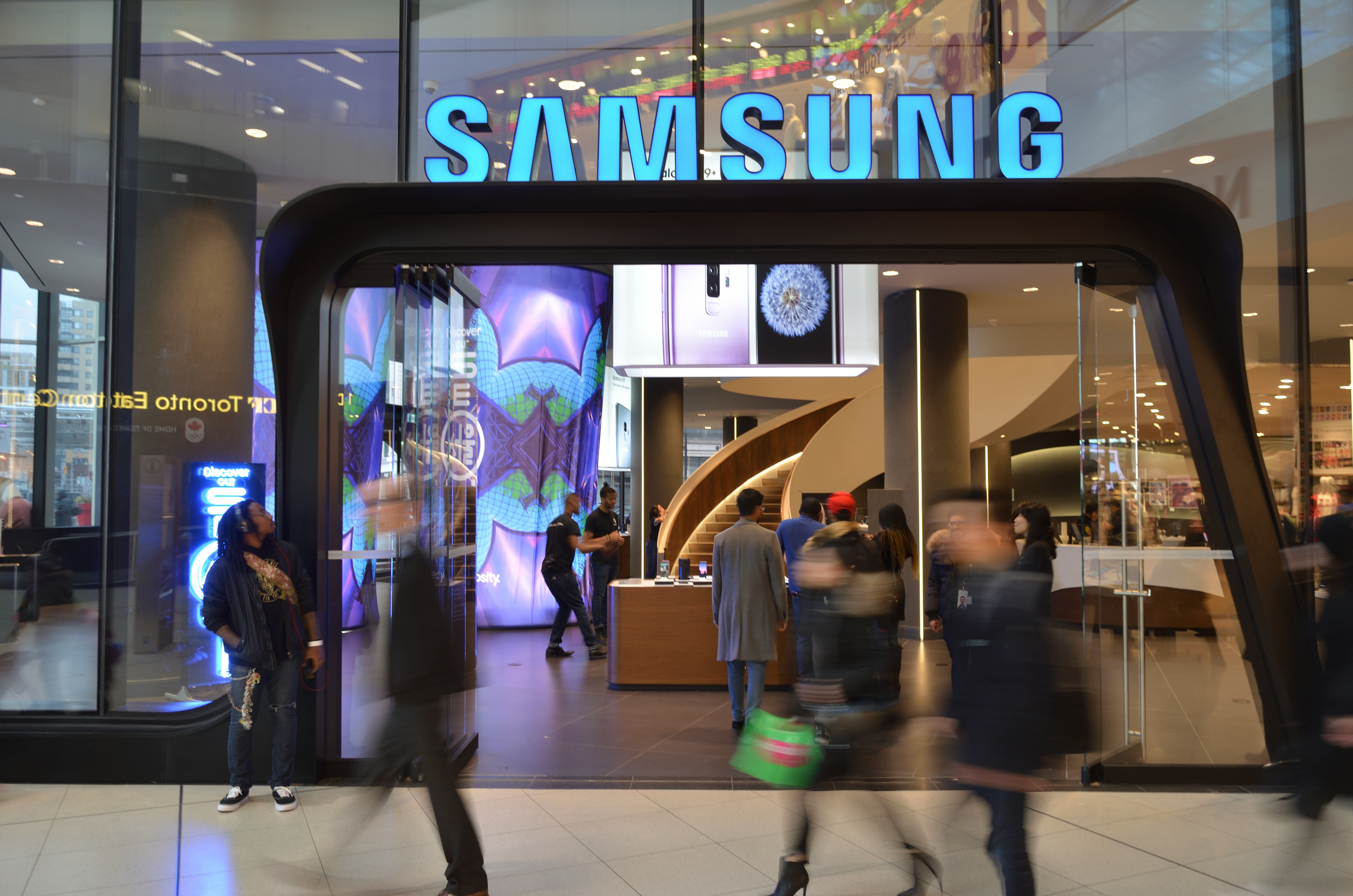
Samsung Experience Store at CF Toronto Eaton Centre, 2017

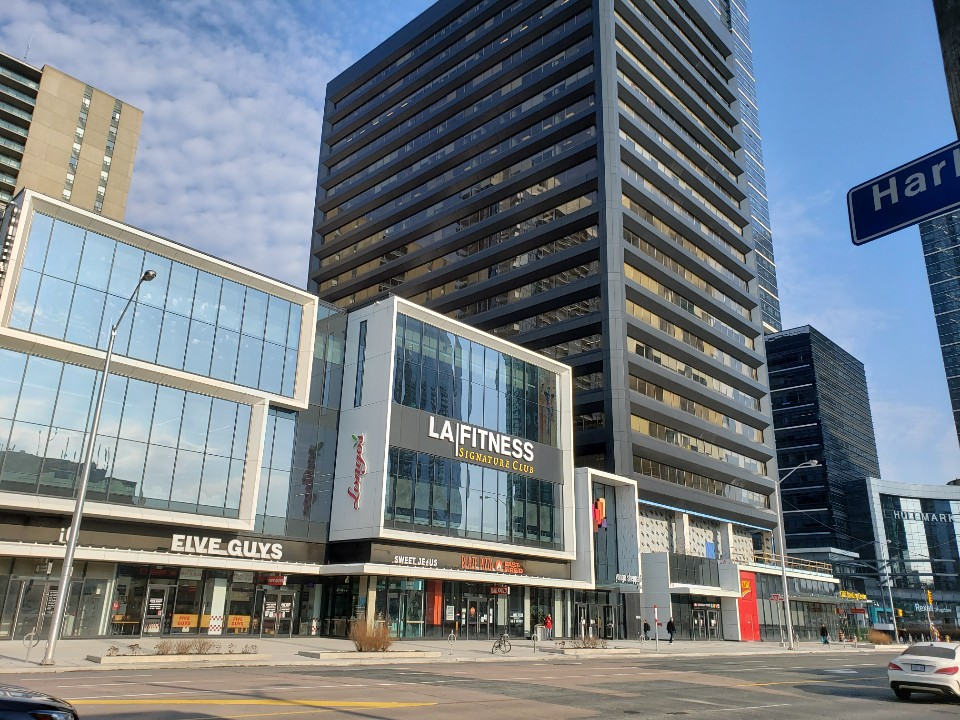
Yonge Sheppard Centre, 2019

Completed in 2017, the 21,000 square foot two-storey store in Toronto's Eaton Centre is inspired by the rounded lines of Samsung Electronic's product range, with a grand curved staircase at the centre of the space. Unlike traditional retail stores, the Samsung Experience Store is designed to showcase the brand, rather than driving in-store sales. It includes a demo kitchen, interactive VR zones, as well as TV displays and customer service zones. The project received a 2018 ARIDO Award for its outstanding interior design.

=== 80 Atlantic Avenue (2019) ===
80 Atlantic is Ontario's first mass timber commercial building in over a century. The project was commissioned by Hullmark Developments to create a paired commercial development with 60 Atlantic. Their intention was to create a premium office that would attract tenants seeking to associate their brand with an innovative and sustainable environment. The 90,000 square-foot structure features four-storeys of nail-laminated timber with glulam beams and columns above a one-storey concrete podium. The mass timber construction was studied by the industry professionals and students as a prototype for future buildings of this type in Ontario.

=== Yonge Sheppard Centre (2019) ===
Covering a total of 8.4 acres, the new Sheppard Yonge development is a mixed-use centre, which includes retail, condo, office, and rental space. The retail phase of the project was completed in 2019, while the Pivot rental tower is due for completion in 2021. Animating the streetscape with diverse retail, the new development is a huge transformation from its 1970 design that did not allow for transparency between the inside and outside. Quadrangle revitalized the outdated mall with easy street-level entrances, wide corridors, large windows, and renovated interiors that emphasize naturally-lit atriums. Black cladding was also added on the two office towers to give the overall centre a modern aesthetic.

=== Downtown Markham (Ongoing) ===
Located on a greenfield site near the Rouge River Valley, Downtown Markham is a mixed-use master-planned community with an urban feel in Markham, a largely car-centric bedroom community north of Toronto. Designed for Remington Group, the sustainable, pedestrian and transit-friendly project features a mix of residential, shopping, office space, recreation spaces, and public art installations with parks and green space leading to the Rouge River System. The project received a BILD Award in the Best New Community (Built) category at the 2017 BILD Awards.

== Awards ==
=== Ontario Association of Architects Awards – Award of Excellence, 2004 ===
- BMW Showroom, 2004

=== Ontario Association of Architects Awards – Landmark Award, 2016 ===
- 299 Queen Street West

=== Association of Registered Interior Designers of Ontario Awards – Award of Excellence, 2011 ===
- Corus Entertainment, 2010

=== Association of Registered Interior Designers of Ontario Awards – Award of Merit, 2015 ===
- 60 Atlantic Avenue, 2014

=== Association of Registered Interior Designers of Ontario Awards, 2018 ===
- [Samsung Experience Store, 2017
- The Travel Centre, 2017
- Toronto Marriott Markham Guest Rooms, 2018

=== BILD Awards – Places to Grow Community of the Year (High Rise) Award, 2012 ===
- Downtown Markham Master Plan, 2009 + Ongoing

=== BILD Awards – Best New Community (Built), 2017 ===
- Downtown Markham Master Plan, 2009 + Ongoing

=== AJ Retrofit Awards – International Innovation, 2015 ===
- 60 Atlantic Avenue, 2014

=== Architectural Record – Good Design is Good Business, 2016 ===
- 60 Atlantic Avenue, 2014

=== Toronto Urban Design Awards – Award of Excellence (Private Buildings in Context, Low-Scale Category), 2015 ===
- 60 Atlantic Avenue, 2014

=== Toronto Urban Design Awards – Award of Merit, 2017 ===
- 619 Queen Street West, 2016

=== Toronto Urban Design Awards – Award of Merit, 2019 ===
- Duke Condos 2803 Dundas Street West, 2017

=== Wood Design and Building Awards – Citation Award, 2019 ===
- 80 Atlantic Avenue, 2020

=== Wood Works! Ontario Awards – Mass Timber Wood Design Award, 2019 ===
- 80 Atlantic Avenue, 2020
