= Laurentian University Student Centre =

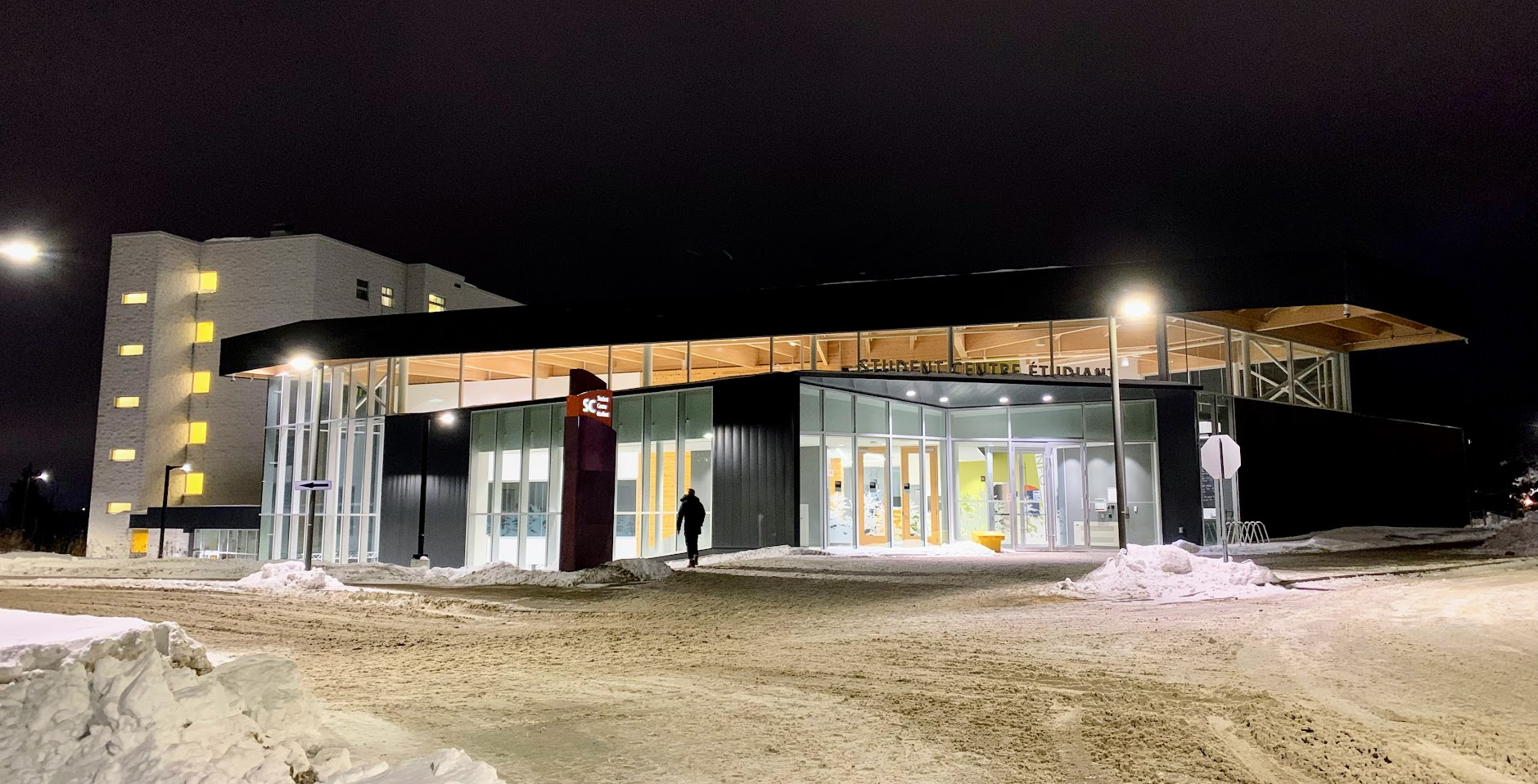
- Laurentian University Student Centre

General information
- Location: Great Sudbury, Ontario, 935 Ramsey Lake Rd, Greater Sudbury, ON, Canada
- Completed: 2021
- Opened: Oct 28, 2019

Technical details
- Floor count: 2
- Floor area: 15,135 sq.ft.

Design and construction
- Architecture firm: Bélanger Salach and Gow Hastings
- Awards: Grand Prix Du Design Award - Silver Winner 2023; Architecture MasterPrize 2021; Interior Designers of Canada (IDC) Value of Design Award (VODA) of Excellence 2021; WoodWorks! Northern Ontario Design Award 2021; Architizer A+Awards Finalist - Higher Education & Research Facilities 2021

The Laurentian University Student Centre is located on the Laurentian University campus in Sudbury, Ontario, Canada. Laurentian University was established in 1960 and is a tri-cultural public university offering undergraduate and graduate studies. The Student Centre is an anchoring place for students at the university providing them with a sheltered home away from home. It is also home to the offices of the Laurentian University Student General Association (SGA). Students of the University visit the Student Centre for events, activities, to study, as a place to gather, and more. The Student Centre blends with the surrounding natural landscape and the urban industrial cityscape while countering the existing brutalist architecture.

== Location ==
The Student Centre is located on the Laurentian University campus in the City of Greater Sudbury, Ontario, Canada. Sudbury is a Northern Ontario city with a population of 166,004 in 2021. Sudbury is thought of as a city of lakes, containing 330 lakes. The university Main Campus is located between three lakes; Ramsey Lake, Lake Nepahwin, and Lake Laurentian. Within the Main Laurentian Campus, the Student Centre is located centrally between the R.D. Parker Building and the West Student Residence. The Centre is the first standalone building in the university's history. Across from the Centre is a forested patch and behind is a steep, rock outcropped landscape with a central walkway leading downward to a parking lot for the campus. The Centre is embedded within the landscape as it follows the elevation changes of the site.

== Architectural style ==
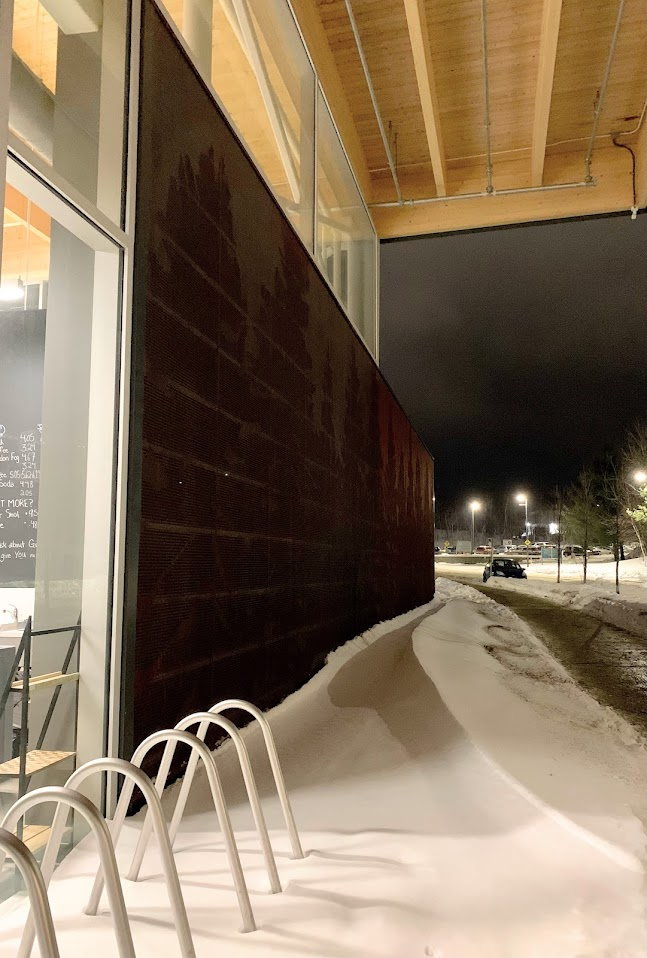
The Laurentian University Student Centre Exterior Corten Steel Detail

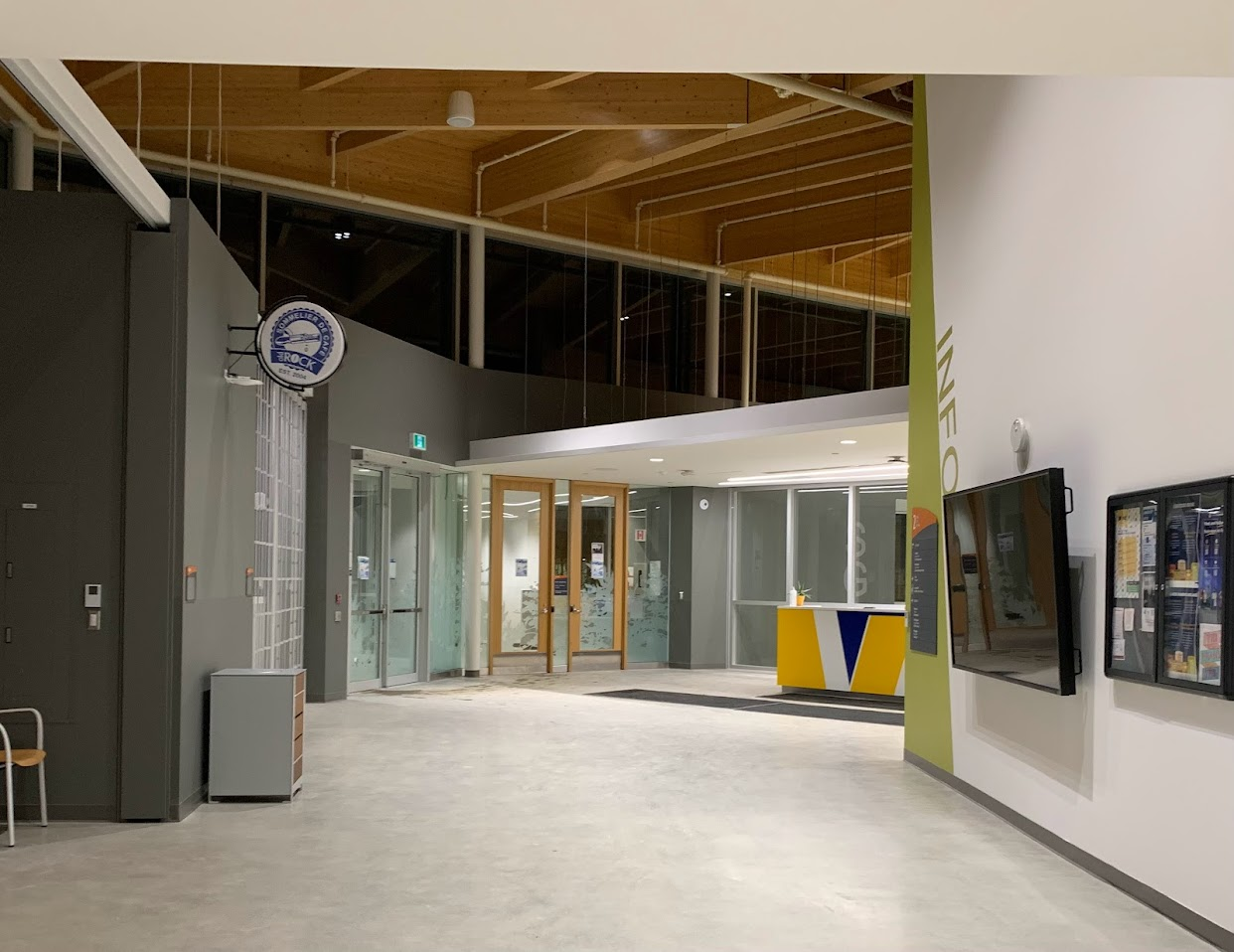
The Laurentian University Student Centre front lobby.

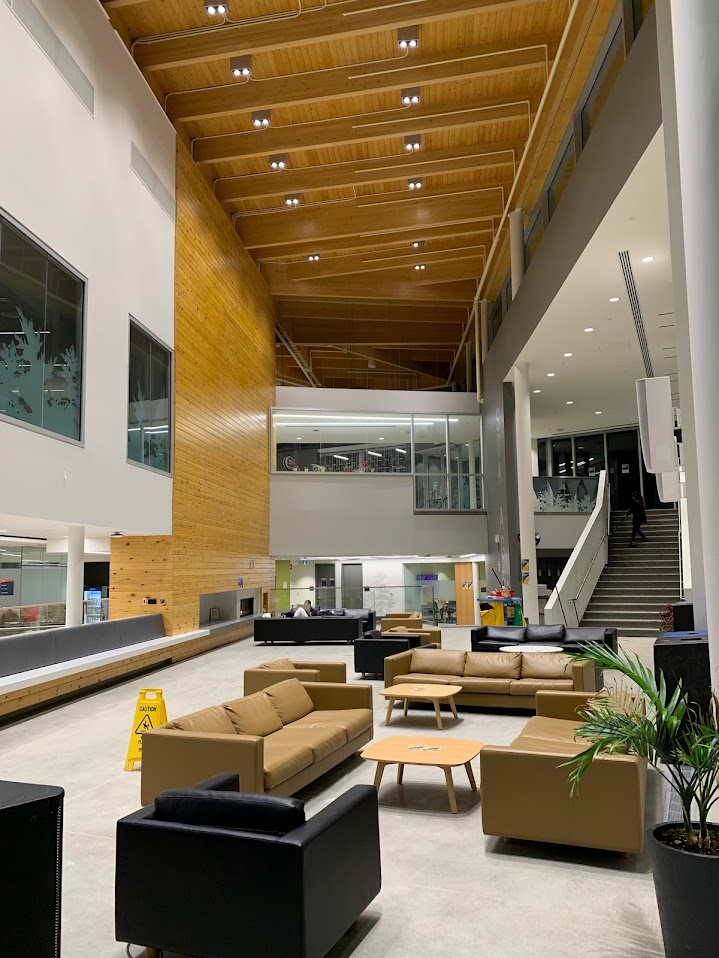
The Laurentian University Student Centre atrium.

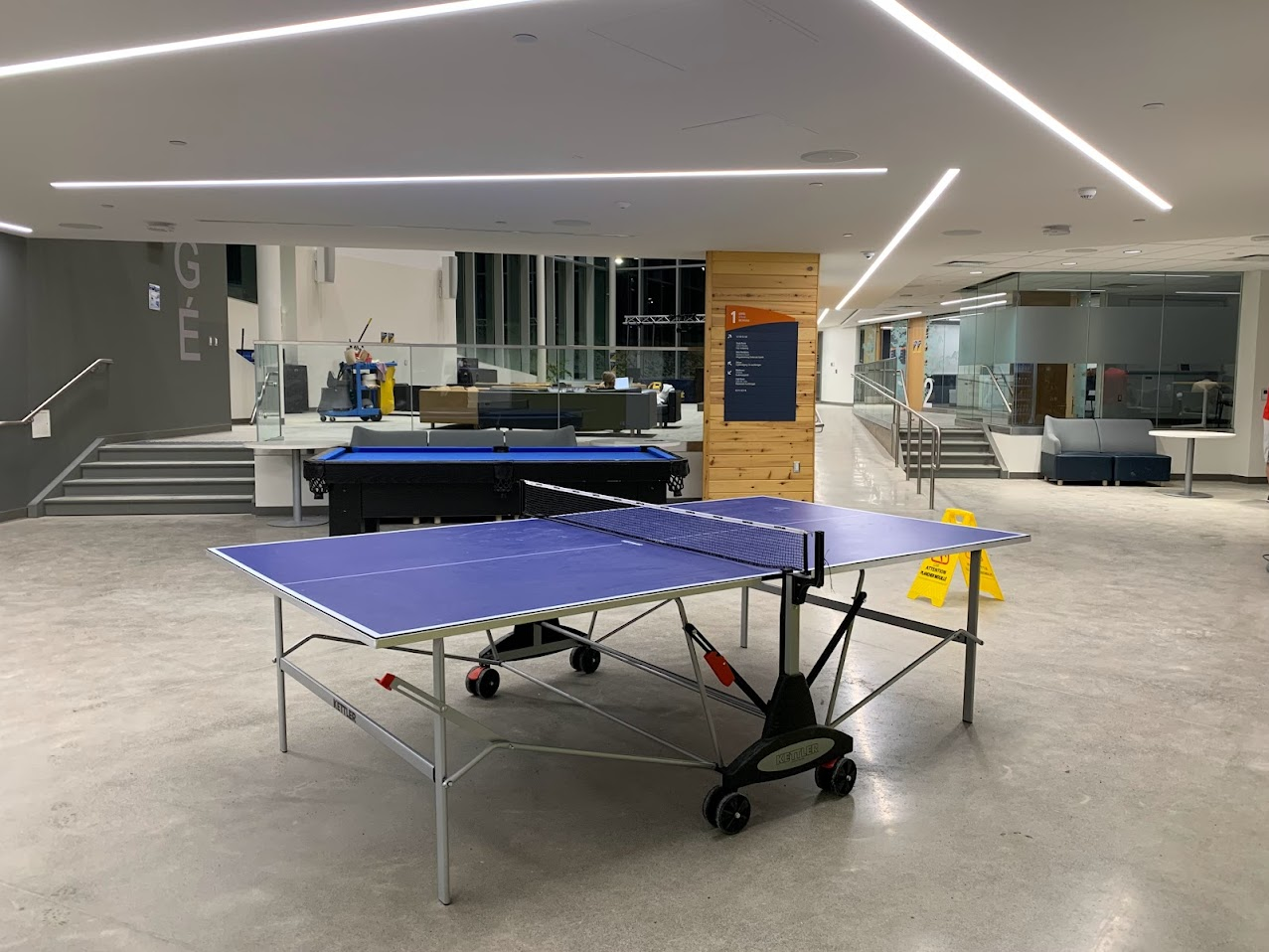
The Laurentian University Student Centre Game Area

The Laurentian University Student Centre was completed in 2021 and designed by the architectural firms Bélanger Salach from Sudbury, Ontario, and Gow Hastings from Toronto, Ontario. The Centre features a unique architectural style which blends the surrounding natural landscape and Sudbury’s urban industrial cityscape while providing a stark juxtaposition from the neighbouring brutalist campus buildings which feature exposed concrete and geometric forms. The Student Centre was designed on a topographically challenging site due to varying changes in elevation which lead to a two-storey design embedded within the site to look as if it is emerging from the landscape. The design of the Centre was awarded the Architecture MasterPrize and the WoodWorks! Northern Ontario Design Awards in 2021. The exterior of the Centre features a unique brow-like shape which provides a sheltered entrance for students and is reflective of the surrounding landscape. The exterior of the Centre was designed to withstand harsh Northern Ontario winters by using steel panels as cladding. Corten Steel was additionally used on the exterior and was engraved with a tree-like pattern that reflects the forest across from the Centre. Over time, the Corten Steel will patina and gain a deeper, rust-like appearance as it weathers. The underside of the brow was clad with wood to reflect the surrounding natural landscape and continues into the interior of the building as well, running along the atrium ceiling. Spruce and pine glue-laminated wood were used throughout the Centre. Sustainability was an additional aspect of the design including a high-performance building envelope, natural ventilation, and solar shading, to produce an environmentally friendly building, allow natural daylight, and a regulate interior temperature.

== Student life ==
The Centre is a 15,135 sq ft two-storey building with a large atrium lounge, private study rooms, and an open concept game room making it feel spacious and welcoming. The building has a room for clubs, Student General Association (SGA) administration offices, meeting rooms, retail space with coffee kiosk, space for taking graduation photos, and two retail areas for pop-up shops and potential future services. The Centre's mix of social, learning, and support spaces enhance student life and give the SGA a place which is truly theirs. The Centre is situated to prioritizes students as it is placed at the direct centre of the Laurentian University campus, connecting both the east and west ends making it a central gathering spot.

== Funding ==
The initial proposal was pioneered by the SGA and voted by members during a referendum back in March 2014 from the 19th to the 20th. The referendum was successful and passed with 601 members voting in favour. The building continues to be funded and paid for through a mandatory incidental fee with an initial budget of seven million dollars. Students have been paying $113 per year toward the new student centre since the referendum passed, and will continue to do so until 2034. In addition to this mandatory fee, the Canadian Federation Of Medical Students (CFMS) joined the team and helped by providing funding for the new addition. In the past prior to this project, the CFMS had also collaborated with the University, providing funding for other projects including the McEwan School of Architecture located on Elm Street in downtown Sudbury, ON, and the Cliff Fielding Research project in part with the Innovation and Engineering Building, also on Laurentian University's Main Campus.
