= Charles Alexander Hopkins =

Educator for sustainable development

Charles Alexander Hopkins CM
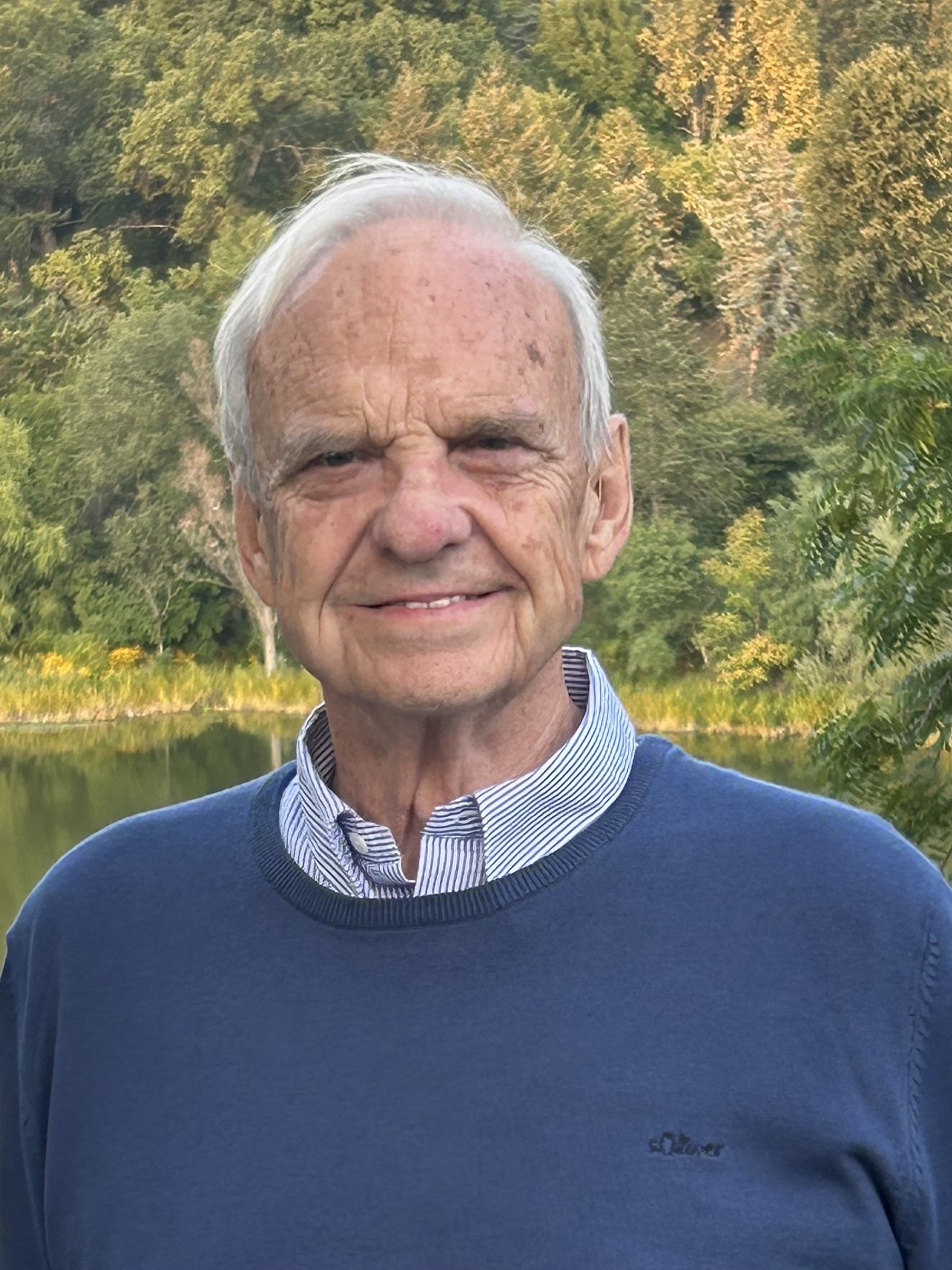
- Born: 1940; Parry Sound, Ontario, Canada
- Occupation: Educator
- Employer(s): Toronto District School Board; York University, Toronto

Charles Alexander "Chuck" Hopkins is an educator who is best known for his contributions to the concept of education for sustainable development.

== Biography ==
He was born in 1940 in Parry Sound, Ontario, Canada, and lives in Toronto. In 1999, following a career in formal education as a principal and superintendent, he became the inaugural UNESCO Chair in Reorienting Education towards Sustainability at York University in Toronto.

=== Teaching ===
Hopkins has previously worked for the Toronto District School Board as the principal of the Island Public/Natural Science School and the Boyne River Natural Science School, as a regional school superintendent, and as superintendent of curriculum.

== Career ==
Hopkins has made considerable contributions to the concept of education for sustainable development (ESD).

When the UNESCO Chair for Reorienting Education towards Sustainability was established in 1999, it was the first chairship to focus on ESD. The aim of the UNESCO Chair, according to the United Nations Commission on Sustainable Development, was to facilitate the creation of a "pilot network of teacher education institutions" working on ESD. The United Nations General Assembly has recognized ESD as a key enabler of all 17 Sustainable Development Goals.

Hopkins was one of the first to apply overarching concepts of sustainable development to education. His advocacy for ESD has included speeches promoting outdoor education in the 1960s and international involvement in developing environmental education in the 1970s. Hopkins also advocates for hands-on engagement as a pedagogical tool. In a 1973 textbook for elementary students, he emphasized school development and neighbourhood exploration as a way for students to become engaged in hands-on learning. He presented to the Brundtland Commission in 1986.

As part of the UN preparation for the Earth Summit in Rio de Janeiro in 1991/92, together with John Smyth, Hopkins helped draft Chapter 36 of Agenda 21: Education, Public Awareness and Training. In 1992, he organized and chaired the World Congress for Education and Communication on Environment and Development Conference (ECO-ED) in Toronto, the first international education and communication conference following the summit. The event was considered one of the 'Canadian milestones' in the efforts towards educating for sustainability.

Hopkins has published widely on the importance of engaging education in implementing sustainable development, and was an early advocate for this approach. He has been involved in UNESCO's education efforts since 1999. He has also chaired the writing and adoption processes of two global UNESCO ESD Declarations: the Bonn Declaration on ESD (2009), marking the mid-point of the United Nations Decade of Education for Sustainable Development (UNDESD), and the Aichi-Nagoya Declaration on ESD (2014), which marked the end of the UNDESD and the launch of the Global Action Programme on ESD.

In addition to his ESD work with UNESCO, he worked with the United Nations University Institute for the Advancement of Sustainability (UNU-IAS) in creating the Global Network of the Regional Centres of Expertise on ESD.

=== Research ===
Hopkins coordinates two global ESD research networks, the International Network of Teacher Education Institutions and the #IndigenousESD. The first network is composed of teacher education institutions spanning 50 countries and focuses on enhancing ESD in pre-service and in-service teacher training. The INTEI network became known for its recommendations on how to reorient teacher education to infuse sustainability in 2005. The second network, covering 40 countries, aims to embed sustainability in curricula to improve the education of Indigenous youth and informed the United Nations Special Rapporteur on the Rights of Indigenous Peoples when addressing the opportunities in a post-pandemic world.

Hopkins currently pursues research and activities with a focus on the whole-institution approach towards sustainability as recommended as a promising tool to create holistic changes by UNESCO.

== Lithuanian treaties ==
In 1973, in coincidental circumstances, Hopkins found a stash of valuable historic Lithuanian treaties from the interwar period. Hopkins was a neighbour of the Lithuanian diplomat Vytautas Jonas Gylys who, prior to the 1940 Soviet occupation of Lithuania, evacuated the documents first to Sweden and later to Canada. After Gylys and, later, his wife died, the boxes with the documents were left for disposal. Having found the documents, Hopkins realized their value and safeguarded them for several decades during the Cold War. It included the original Soviet–Lithuanian Peace Treaty of 1920 as well as other international treaties. After returning the documents to Lithuania in 2021, Hopkins received the Order for Merits to Lithuania state award – on 6 July 2022, the Statehood Day in Lithuania. The award was presented by the President of Lithuania Gitanas Nausėda.

== Honours ==
Hopkins has received honorary doctorates from Uppsala University in Sweden (2006), the National University of Trujillo in Peru (2011), and Okayama University in Japan (2019). In 2022, he received the inaugural Clean 50 Lifetime Achievement Award for his efforts in connecting education to business and industry in Canada and globally. In 2025, he received another Lifetime Achievement Award from the Association for the Advancement of Sustainability in Higher Education (AASHE) as the first Canadian to ever be awarded.

=== State awards ===
- Lithuania
  - Order for Merits to Lithuania (2022)
- Canada
  - Member of the Order of Canada (2025)
