= Gow Hastings Architects =

Canadian architectural firm

Practice information
- Firm type: Architecture firm
- Key architects: Allan Baniña, associate Andrew Chiu, architect Janice Lee, senior architect Juliana Lee, architect Anne Ma, architect Hugo Martins, associate Rebecca Wei, senior architect Stephen Wenzel, architect
- Partners: Valerie Gow; Philip Hastings
- Founders: Valerie Gow; Philip Hastings
- Founded: 2002
- Location: Toronto, Ontario. Canada

Significant works and honors
- Awards: Best of Canada, 2009, 2018 OAA Award, 2009; ARIDO, 2009, 2016, 2021 TUDA, 2019

Website
- gowhastings.com

Gow Hastings Architects is a Canadian architectural firm specializing in post-secondary, commercial, and public buildings. Founded in 2002 by Valerie Gow and Philip Hastings, the Toronto-based firm has designed over 350 teaching and learning spaces for institutions across Ontario.

== History ==
Both graduates of the University of British Columbia, Valerie Gow and Philip Hastings founded Gow Hastings Architects in 2002 after working independently in Vancouver and London. Their offices are at 275 Spadina Road in Toronto.

From 2003 onwards, Gow Hastings received progressively larger commissions from post-secondary clients in Southern Ontario. In the late 2000s, the firm was considered the “village” architect for Humber College, where it completed over thirty projects that cemented its reputation in educational design. Gow Hastings were also recognized for their postsecondary culinary expertise.

Valerie Gow was inducted into the Royal Architecture Institute of Canada (RAIC) College of Fellows in 2016. Philip Hastings became a RAIC Fellow in 2018.

== Selected projects ==
=== George Brown College ===
In 2009, Gow Hastings designed two buildings for George Brown College with Kearns Mancini Architects. The college's Centre for Hospitality & Culinary Arts and The Chefs’ House Restaurant introduced transparency and hands-on learning to the design of Canada's culinary schools. To engage passersby and encourage enrolment in the culinary program, both buildings feature a glass wall that reveals the chefs and teaching kitchens to the street. In the culinary labs, cameras and screens help students get close-up views of live cooking demonstrations.

In 2009, these projects won the Ontario Association of Architects Award for Design Excellence, an ARIDO Award, and the Best of Canada Award.

=== Humber College ===
As Humber College's "village architect" from 2009 to 2010, Gow Hastings created numerous hands-on learning environments that closely replicate professional working scenarios. For example, the Centre for Trades and Technology (2009) includes two full-scale townhouses where students can practice woodworking, welding, plumbing, and electrical work. The Music Production & Recording Studio (2009) is a 1980s building retrofitted by Gow Hastings to create the optimal environment for music recording. The design team also converted several non-institutional buildings for educational purposes, including converting a car sales center into the Centre for Justice Leadership (2010), an ice hockey rink into a Performing Arts School (2010), and a bar into a Fashion Institute (2010).

=== Galen Weston Centre for Food ===
The Durham College W Galen Weston Centre for Food is an infill building located in Whitby, Ontario. Completed in 2015, the building embodies the school's farm-to-fork values and nods to its rural setting. Gow Hastings designed a two-storey edible herb wall on the interior and glass partitions that provides views into laboratories and kitchens. The building also incorporates sustainable elements such as solar panels, an insulating green roof, and a rooftop apiary. The project won a 2016 ARIDO Award for its green design.

=== Ryerson University Student ServiceHub ===
One of the firm's several projects completed for Ryerson University, the Student ServiceHub renovated a 1,250 square metres (13,500 sq ft) Brutalist-era cafeteria into a Registrar's Office. Ryerson's admissions, enrolment, and financial services were located in three different buildings on the downtown campus. In 2016, Gow Hastings designed a hub that brought these operations together. Their design integrated environmental graphics and coloured-glass space dividers to reflect the university's branding. The project won a 2016 ARIDO award for its interior design.

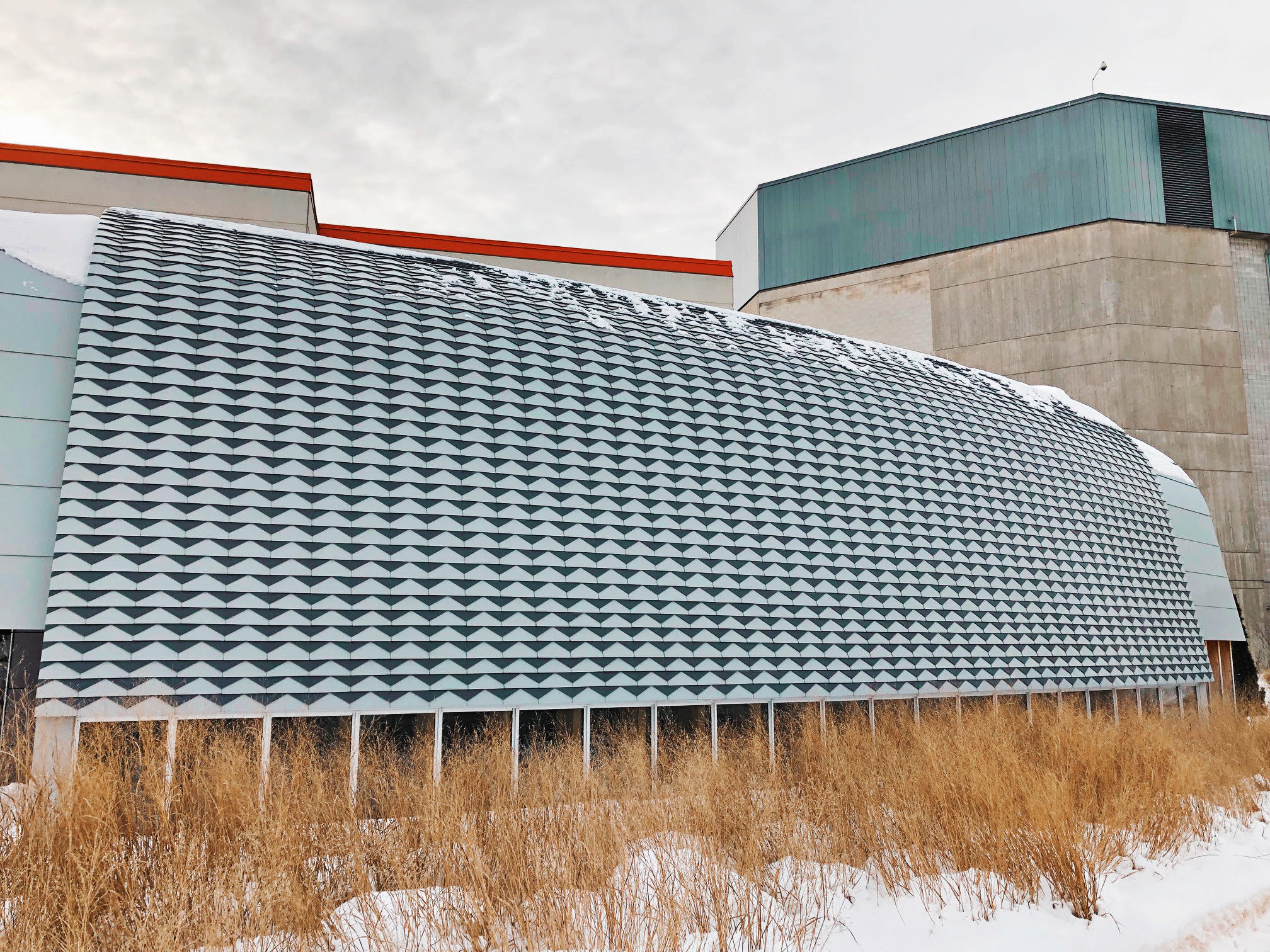
Odeyto Indigenous Centre

=== Seneca College Odeyto Indigenous Centre ===
In 2018, Gow Hastings completed the Odeyto Indigenous Centre, a multi-purpose facility for First Peoples at Seneca College in Toronto, in collaboration with Two Row Architects. The Odeyto building takes its name from the Anishinaabe word for “good journey”. Its shape was inspired by a canoe pulling up to a dock. Odeyto was named one of the 10 Best Canadian Architecture Projects of 2018 by Azure magazine. In 2019, Odeyto received a Toronto Urban Design Award (TUDA) in the category Public Buildings in Context.

=== Fleming College A-Wing ===
In 2019, the firm renovated and upgraded Fleming College’s A-Wing building at its Sutherland Campus in Peterborough, Ontario. The project included cladding the imposing brutalist institution with yellow and white-coloured folded aluminum panels and adding extensive glazing to draw natural light indoors. The project was considered an exercise in “overwriting” a dated building with a contemporary aesthetic. In 2019, this building was featured in Architect, the journal of the American Institute of Architects. It also received an ARIDO Award in the LEARN category in 2021.
