= Janice J Eng =

Professor

Janice Eng OC
- Born: 1963 (age 62–63)

Academic background
- Education: University of British Columbia; MSc, Biomedical Engineering, University of Toronto; PhD, Kinesiology, 1994, University of Waterloo
- Thesis: Biomechanical and neuromuscular strategies for a recovery from a trip during human walking. (1994)

Janice Jennifer Eng (born 1963) is a professor in the University of British Columbia's Department of Physical Therapy and Canada Research Chair (Tier 1) in Neurological Rehabilitation.

== Early life and education ==
Eng was born in 1963. She earned her undergraduate degree at the University of British Columbia (UBC) before moving to Ontario and enrolling at the University of Toronto for her MSc in Biomedical Engineering. Upon earning her Master's degree, she completed her doctorate in Kinesiology at the University of Waterloo and returned to British Columbia for her post-doctoral training in Neurophysiology at Simon Fraser University.

== Career ==
Upon completing her post-doctoral training, Eng accepted a professorship position in the University of British Columbia's Department of Physical Therapy. During her early tenure at the institution, Eng developed a rehabilitation program to assist stroke survivors and she received the Jonas Salk Award from the March of Dimes Canada for her efforts. Her research team devised the Graded Repetitive Arm Supplementary Program which consisted of a set of exercises for the arm and hand to improve recovery of arm function in stroke patients. She also developed the Fitness and Mobility Exercise (FAME) evidence-based exercise program to assist people recovering from a stroke, Parkinson’s disease, MS and frail older adults. It has been shown to improve strength, balance, cardiovascular fitness, bone density and reduce falls in people working to regain mobility following neurological injury. The YWCA Vancouver awarded Eng with the 2010 YWCA Women of Distinction Award in the category of Health and Active Living.

In 2015, Eng was the recipient of a Canadian Institutes of Health Research grant to fund her rehabilitative program research to aid stroke survivors. She also received the 2015 Distinguished Medical Lecturer Award in Clinical Sciences. In 2016, Eng was awarded a Tier 1 Canada Research Chair for being "recognized as a leader in rehabilitation research."

In 2019, Eng established the Exoskeleton for post-Stroke Recovery of Ambulation (ExStRA) study to use a robotic exoskeleton for early walking practice after a stroke. She also co-led a Canadian Institute for Health Research study which paired outpatients with coaches to prevent a second stroke. Within the first six months, patients were shown to have lower blood pressure and made healthier lifestyle choices.

Eng was made an Officer of the Order of Canada on December 31, 2025.
