= Odeyto Indigenous Centre =

Canadian college student center

Coordinates: 43°47′47″N 79°20′56″W

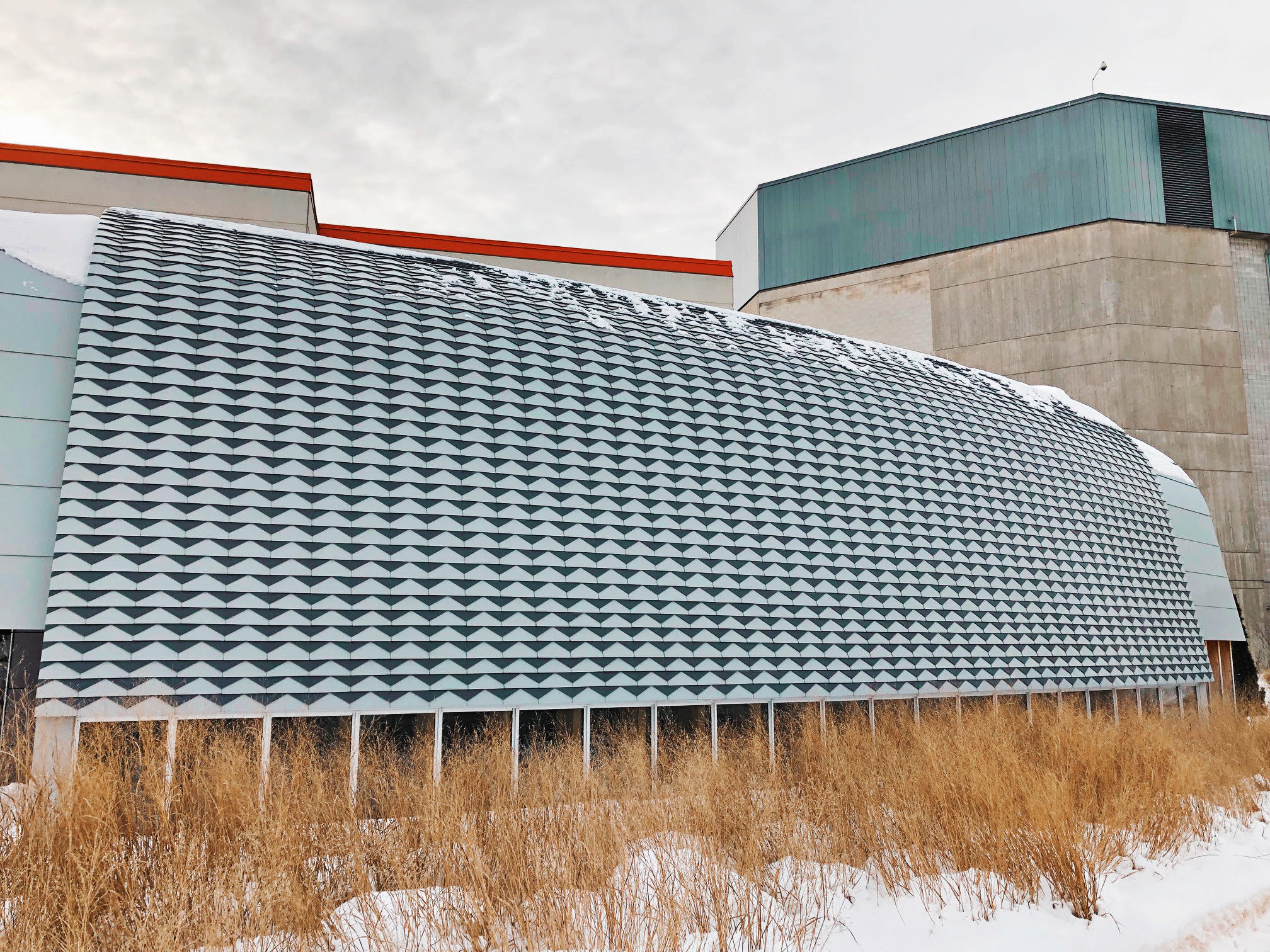
- Interactive map of Odeyto Indigenous Centre

General information
- Architectural style: Indigenous architecture
- Location: 1750 Finch Avenue East, North York, Toronto, Canada
- Completed: 2018
- Cost: $2.8 million Canadian
- Owner: Seneca College

Technical details
- Floor area: 167 square metres (1,800 sq ft)

Design and construction
- Architects: Gow Hasting Architects; Two Row Architects

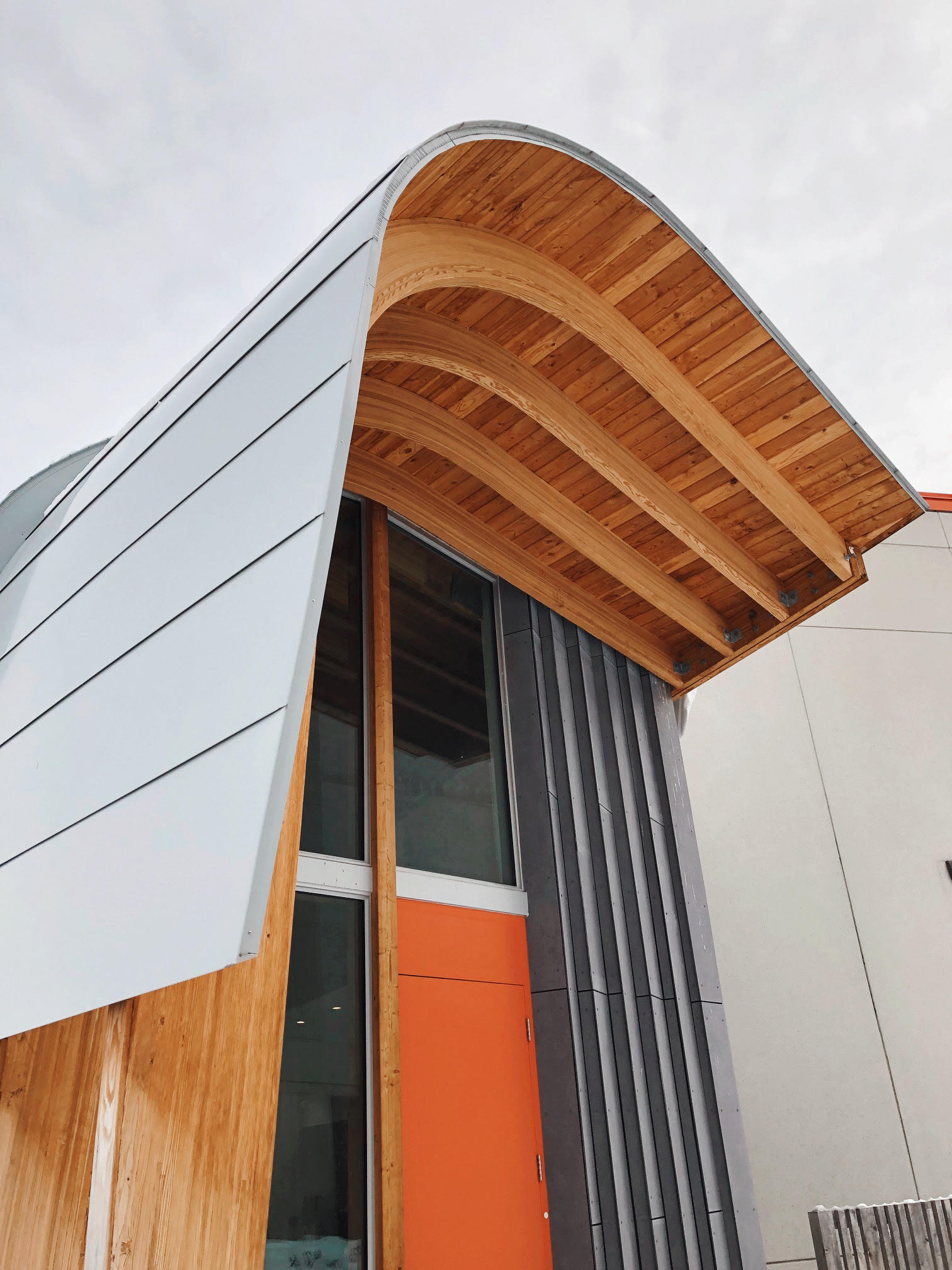
Odeyto Indigenous Centre entrance with red door

Odeyto Indigenous Centre is a purpose-built Indigenous student space on Seneca College's Newnham Campus in North York, Toronto, Canada. Odeyto provides a space where Indigenous students can feel safe and connected to their communities when away from home, while also rediscovering and practicing their traditions.

Gow Hasting Architects (project team: Valerie Gow, Jim Burkitt, Graham Bolton, and Courtney Klein) designed the building in partnership with Two Row Architect, a native-owned firm from the Six Nations reserve in southern Ontario. Their collaboration not only embeds Indigenous knowledge into the design but is also created a significant contribution to Indigenous Architecture. Azure magazine wrote, "Odeyto pays more than lip service to the implementation of Native building practices, giving gorgeous physical form to an important – and long-neglected – aesthetic."

== History ==
The name Odeyto means “The Good Journey” in Anishinaabe. Odeyto Indigenous Centre was a joint effort of the Truth and Reconciliation Commission of Canada, Seneca College, and the provincial government. The project renovated and expanded an existing classroom space for $2.8 million Canadian. The building serves as a venue for Indigenous cultural and social events and is also used for studying, tutoring, and counseling.

Each year, Seneca College has between 400 and 700 students who identify as Indigenous. The college's purpose-built Odeyto allows these students to feel valued, engage and bond with the Seneca community, and reclaim their space by celebrating Indigenous culture. Students from other campuses come to the Newnham Campus to join in ceremonies and feasts at Odeyto such as the day-long Tasewung feast. For this event, participants assemble dishes that remind them of a loved one who has passed onto the spirit world and share stories that celebrate the life of their loved ones. Odeyto is also a place where students engage in story-telling with Elders.

== Design ==
Gow Hasting Architects and Two Row Architect developed a building with a warm, organic curvilinear form that contrasts with the colonial grid structures elsewhere on campus. Brian Porter and Matthew Hickey of Two Row Architect came up with a design concept inspired by an upturned, resting canoe, symbolizing the students' stop at Seneca College to gather knowledge before continuing on life's journey. The 167 square metres (1,800 sq ft) building is also "docked" alongside a contrasting precast concrete building.

Odeyto Indigenous Centre's exterior is clad with triangular zinc shingles that are folded and interlocked to replicate the White Pine Tree of Peace, a symbol of the Haudenosaunee wampum belt. This design stemmed from folding pieces of paper together. The zinc shingles also have a faint glimmer that replicates fish scales.

The building's entrance doors are painted red, inspiring those who enter to “walk the red road” which means to live a life of "respect, humility, and truthfulness." The color red is also a reminder of Canada's missing and murdered Indigenous women and children. The entrances are oriented with consideration of Indigenous tradition. One is facing the east which represents birth, and the other faces the west which represents death. These glass entrances also align with the summer solstice.

Indigenous culture and teachings are also symbolically embedded throughout the building's interior; a dominant feature being its Haudenosaunee longhouse typology. The curves of the exterior "create a warm, womb-like interior." The structure has a vaulted ceiling supported by 28 Douglas fir ribs—each rib represents a day of the lunar cycle. These delicate and light ribs are similar to the ribs found on the underside of a birch bark canoe. In addition, the building is decorated with contemporary art by Kent Monkman and Steven Paul Judd, both Indigenous Canadian artists. Neon art by Joi Arcand spells out "Don't Be Ashamed" in the Cree language.

The center's main lounge is generously sized for celebrations and traditional ceremonies such as smudging. Its kitchen enables students to gather to prepare and share food, honoring a core tenet of Indigenous culture. The kitchen has fluted ceramic tiles that relate to the nearby artwork, "Dish with One Spoon wampum land acknowledgment belt." The building also has counseling offices and student work areas.

Odeyto is situated in the center of a green space that landscape architect firm Forrec designed. The grounds are divided into two separate gardens, representing the Boreal and Carolinian biomes where the First Peoples in Ontario have lived for thousands of years. The western garden features conifers while the eastern garden is a deciduous medicine garden. The interior programming spaces are close to the outdoor garden so it can be easily utilized for traditional teachings and ceremonies.

In June each year, the building's primary circulation axis aligns with the summer solstice, a time when many Indigenous people celebrate traditional sunrise ceremonies. The arc of the building's interior matches the sun's path on the solstice.

== Awards ==
- 10 Best Canadian Architecture Projects: Best Implementation of Native Building Practises, Azure magazine, 2018
- Public Buildings in Context Award of Merit, Toronto Urban Design Awards, City of Toronto, 2019
- Design and Building Award citation by Wood Design magazine, 2021
- Gold Winner for Public Building / Higher Education & Research Building, Grand Prix Du Design Awards, 14th edition, INT Design, 2021
