= Peter Annan =

Engineer

Peter Annan CM
- Born: Alexander Peter Annan
- Education: University of Toronto (BASc & MS); Memorial University of Newfoundland (PhD, 1974)
- Occupations: Geophysicist; engineer

Alexander Peter Annan is an engineer whose research focuses on near-surface geophysics. He has made significant contributions to the development of ground-penetrating radar (GPR) technology. Annan is the CEO of Sensors & Software, a company he founded to commercialize GPR technology. He has been working on the development of GPR since the 1970s and was one of the lead researchers on the surface electrical properties experiment conducted on the Moon during the Apollo 17 mission.

== Early life and education ==
Annan graduated from University of Toronto with a Bachelor of Applied Science degree in engineering science in 1968 and a Master of Science degree in geophysics in 1970. In 1972, Annan was one of the researchers on the surface electrical properties (SEP) experiment on the Apollo 17 mission to the Moon. SEP was the subject of Annan's graduate school research and used radio waves to scan as far as a few kilometres below the surface of the Moon.

In 1974, he earned his PhD in engineering science from Memorial University of Newfoundland. In his thesis, The Equivalent Source Method for Electromagnetic Scattering Analysis and Its Geophysical Application, Annan developed the PLATE program used in transient electromagnetics to mathematically model the electromagnetic response of finite thin conducting plates.

== Career ==
After earning his PhD, Annan began working as a research scientist at the Geological Survey of Canada. He then served as chief geophysicist at Barringer Research and senior engineering geophysicist at Golder Associates. During this time, he developed methods for the use of radio frequency to measure soil water content. In 1981, Annan founded A-Cubed to develop ground-penetrating radar (GPR) and airborne electromagnetic (AEM) systems . The GEOTEM and MEGATEM AEM systems flown by Geoterrex (subsequently Fugro) and the SPECTREM system flown by Anglo American have surveyed millions of line km world wide in search of base metals and mapping groundwater.

When the Waterloo Centre for Groundwater Research was founded at the University of Waterloo in 1987, Annan joined the centre as a part-time researcher and adjunct professor. He subsequently served on the board of directors of the Waterloo Centre for Groundwater Research, CRESTech, and the Ontario Centres of Excellence.

In 1988, Annan formed the multiVIEW Geoservices, a company focused on carrying engineering and urban geophysical surveys. The company grew rapidly after 2000 and primarily services the Subsurface Utility Engineering market in Ontario, Canada.

In 1989, Annan commercialized GPR systems by forming Sensors & Software, a supplier of equipment for underground or subsurface surveying. The company developed many systems that are sold globally. He retired in 2020 as CEO of Sensors & Software based in Mississauga, Ontario.

Annan has been a member of Society of Exploration Geophysicists (SEG) since 1969 and has received the SEG's Cecil Green Enterprise Award. At SEG, he served as chair of the Mining Committee, president of the Near-Surface Geophysics Section (NSGS), which he founded, and as editor of NSGS's newsletter Near Surface Views. In 1996, SEG awarded him the Hal Mooney Award for “scientific and technical excellence and innovation" in near-surface geophysics. He also served as second vice-president, and director-at-large for SEG. Annan is also a member of the Canadian Exploration Geophysical Society and lectured about near-surface geophysics in the society's KEGS Special Lecture program in 2015.

He was made a Member of the Order of Canada on December 31, 2025.

== Selected publications ==
- Annan, A. P. (June 1, 1973). "Radio interferometry depth sounding: part i—theoretical discussion". Geophysics. 38 (3): 557–580. Bibcode:1973Geop...38..557A. doi:10.1190/1.1440360. ISSN 0016-8033.
- Annan, A. P. (January 31, 1974). The Equivalent Source Method for Electromagnetic Scattering Analysis and Its Geophysical Application (PDF) (PhD thesis). Memorial University of Newfoundland.
- Annan, A. P.; Davis, J. L. (1976). "Impulse radar sounding in permafrost". Radio Science. 11 (4): 383–394. Bibcode:1976RaSc...11..383A. doi:10.1029/RS011i004p00383. ISSN 1944-799X.
- Topp, G. C.; Davis, J. L.; Annan, A. P. (1980). "Electromagnetic determination of soil water content: Measurements in coaxial transmission lines". Water Resources Research. 16 (3): 574–582. Bibcode:1980WRR....16..574T. doi:10.1029/WR016i003p00574. ISSN 1944-7973.
- Davis, J. L.; Annan, A. P. (1989). "Ground-Penetrating Radar for High-Resolution Mapping of Soil and Rock Stratigraphy". Geophysical Prospecting. 37 (5): 531–551. Bibcode:1989GeopP..37..531D. doi:10.1111/j.1365-2478.1989.tb02221.x. ISSN 1365-2478.
- Annan, A. P.; Cosway, S. W. (January 1, 1992). "Ground Penetrating Radar Survey Design". Symposium on the Application of Geophysics to Engineering and Environmental Problems 1992. Symposium on the Application of Geophysics to Engineering and Environmental Problems Proceedings. Environment and Engineering Geophysical Society: 329–351. doi:10.4133/1.2921946.
- Huisman, J. A.; Hubbard, S. S.; Redman, J. D.; Annan, A. P. (November 2003). "Measuring Soil Water Content with Ground Penetrating Radar". Vadose Zone Journal. 2 (4): 476–491. doi:10.2136/vzj2003.4760. S2CID 18385194.
- Annan, A. P. (January 1, 2005). "Ground-Penetrating Radar". Near-Surface Geophysics. Investigations in Geophysics. Society of Exploration Geophysicists. pp. 357–438. doi:10.1190/1.9781560801719.ch11. ISBN 978-1-56080-130-6.
- Annan, A.P. (December 8, 2008). "Electromagnetic Principles of Ground Penetrating Radar". In Jol, Harry M. (ed.). Ground Penetrating Radar Theory and Applications. Elsevier. pp. 5–7. ISBN 978-0-08-095184-3.
