= Regional Centres of Expertise on Education for Sustainable Development =

Networks that facilitate learning and action on sustainability in local communities

Map of the global RCE network.

The Regional Centres of Expertise on Education for Sustainable Development; abbreviated RCE is a global network of 200 institutional networks acknowledged by the United Nations University (UNU) which focus on the development and practices of Education for Sustainable Development (ESD) in local regions across the world. Established and coordinated under the UNU Institute for the Advanced Study of Sustainability (UNU-IAS), these regional networks address local sustainable development challenges through research and capacity development, with a focus on translating its global objectives into the context of the local communities in which they operate.

== History ==
In response to the United Nations Decade of Education for Sustainable Development (DESD, 2005-2014), the United Nations University called for the development of regional networks for the promotion of Education for Sustainable Development (ESD). These networks address local sustainable development challenges through research and capacity development. As a result of the Ubuntu Declaration signed in 2002, RCE was introduced, with This was the birth of RCE. RCEs are acknowledged by the UNU based on recommendations of the Ubuntu Committee of Peers for the RCEs, which consists of signatories of the Ubuntu Declaration signed in 2002.

RCEs aspire to achieve the goals of the DESD by translating its global objectives into the context of the local communities in which they operate. This is then accomplished by acting as a catalyst for institutions that promote ESD through formal, non-formal and informal education, and by providing suitable platforms to share information and experiences and to promote dialogue among regional stakeholders through partnerships for sustainable development. They also develop regional knowledge bases to support ESD and promote its goals in a resource effective manner. This can be achieved through the delivery of training programmes, by facilitating research into ESD, through public awareness raising, and by increasing the quality and access to ESD in the region.

An RCE should have four core elements:

- Governance - addressing issues of RCE management and leadership
- Collaboration - addressing the engagement of actors from all levels of formal, non-formal and informal education
- Research and development - addressing the role of research and its inclusion in RCE activities, as well as contributing to the design of strategies for collaborative activities, including those with other RCEs
- Transformative education - contributing to the transformation of the current education and training systems to satisfy ambitions of the region regarding sustainable living and livelihood.

RCEs also have four major ESD goals to be promoted in an effective way:

- Re-orientating education towards SD, by covering integrating SD and ESD into the current curriculum and tailoring it to address issues and local context of the community in which they operate;
- Increase access to quality education that is most needed in the regional context;
- Deliver trainers’ training programmes and to develop methodologies and learning materials for them;
- Lead advocacy and awareness raising efforts to raise public awareness about the importance of educators and the essential role of ESD in achieving a sustainable future. RCEs promote the long-term goals of ESD, such as environmental stewardship, social justice, and improvement of the quality of life.

RCEs are not only significant for the region itself, where they provide a unique opportunity to promote learning and development for SD, but also important at international level where they help to constitute the Global Learning Space for Sustainable Development. Globally, RCEs are facilitated through the United Nations University Institute for Advanced Studies (UNU-IAS) who provide a framework for strategy, best practice and techniques for success, which can then be translated to the regional level.

RCEs have recently been acknowledged in the 2009 Bonn Declaration which calls for action to “develop knowledge through ESD networking” through “networks that could serve as centres of expertise and innovation”.

== RCEs around the world ==
As of January 2023, there are 170 RCEs in the Global network including:

In Africa:

- Buea, Cameroon
- Cairo, Egypt
- Central Kenya, Kenya
- Dar es Salaam, Tanzania
- Gauteng, South Africa
- Ghana
- Greater Eastern Uganda, Uganda
- Greater Kampala, Uganda
- Greater Masaka, Uganda
- Greater Mbarara, Uganda
- Greater Nairobi, Kenya
- Greater Pwani, Kenya
- Harare, Zimbabwe
- Jordan, Jordan
- Kaduna, Nigeria
- Kano, Nigeria
- Kakamega-Western, Kenya
- Khomas-Erongo, Namibia
- KwaZulu Natal, South Africa
- Lagos, Nigeria
- Lesotho
- Lusaka, Zambia
- Mau Ecosystem Complex, Kenya
- Makana and Rural Eastern Cape, South Africa
- Maputo, Mozambique
- Minna, Nigeria
- Mount Kenya East, Kenya
- Mutare, Zimbabwe
- North Rift, Kenya
- Nyanza, Kenya
- Port Harcourt, Nigeria
- Senegal
- South Rift, Kenya
- Swaziland
- Zaria, Nigeria
- Zomba, Malawi

In Europe and the Middle East:

- Açores, Portugal
- Barcelona, Spain
- Basque Country+Navarre, Spain
- Albania, Middle Albania
- Bordeaux-Aquitaine, France
- Brittany, France
- Central Macedonia
- Crete, Greece
- Creias-Oeste, Portugal
- Czechia, Czech Republic
- Denmark, Denmark
- Dublin, Ireland
- East Midlands, UK
- Espoo, Finland
- Euroregion Tyrol
- Galicia, Spain
- Graz-Styria, Austria
- Greater Manchester, UK
- Hamburg, Germany
- Ireland
- London, UK
- Munich, Germany
- Nizhny Novgorod, Russia
- North East Centre for Transformative Education and Research (NECTER), UK
- North Sweden
- Nuremberg, Germany
- Oldenburger Muensterland
- Paris Seine
- Porto Metropolitan Area, Portugal
- Rhein Meuse Cross Border Rhine-Meuse region Netherlands/Germany/France
- Ruhr
- Samara, Russia
- Scotland
- Severn, UK
- RCE Skane, Sweden
- Skane, Sweden
- Southern Black Forest
- Southern North Sea, Belgium/Netherlands/France
- Uppsala-Gotland, Sweden
- Vienna, Austria
- Vilnius, Lithuania
- Vojvodina, Serbia
- Wales, UK
- West Sweden
- Yorkshire and Humberside, UK

In South America and the Caribbean:

- Bogota, Colombia
- Chaco, Argentina
- Cuenca del Plata, Argentina
- Curitiba-Parana, Brazil
- Lima-Callao, Peru
- Rio de Janeiro, Brazil
- São Paulo, Brazil

In North and Central America:

- Atlanta, USA
- Borderlands Mexico, USA
- British Columbia, Canada
- Detroit-Windsor (USA and Canada)
- Georgetown, USA
- Grand Rapids, USA
- Greater Burlington, USA
- Greater Sudbury, Canada
- Greater Portland, USA
- Guatemala
- Montreal, Canada
- North Texas, USA
- Peterborough-Kawarthas, Canada
- Salisbury, Maryland, USA
- Saskatchewan, Canada
- Shenandoah Valley, USA
- Tantramar, Canada
- Toronto, Canada
- Mauricie/Centre-du-Quebec, Canada
- Western Jalisco, Mexico

In the Asia-Pacific region

- Australia, Western Australia; Perth and Albany.
- Anji, China
- Arunachal Pradesh, India
- Bangalore, India
- Beijing, China
- Bogor, Indonesia
- Bohol, Philippines
- Cebu, Philippines
- Central Semenanjung, Malaysia
- Cha-am, Thailand
- Chandigarh, India
- Changwon, Korea
- Chennai, India
- Chubu, Japan
- Delhi, India
- East Kalimantan, Indonesia
- Gippsland, Australia
- Goa, India
- Greater Dhaka, Bangladesh
- Greater Gombak, Malaysia
- Greater Phnom Penh, Cambodia
- Greater Sendai, Japan
- Greater Western Sydney, Australia
- Guwahati, India
- Hohhot, China
- Hokkaido Central, Japan
- Hyogo-Kobe, Japan
- Ilocos, Philippines
- Incheon, Korea
- Inje, Korea
- Iskandar, Malaysia
- Jammu, India
- Kitakyushu, Japan
- Kodagu, India
- Kunming, China
- Kyrgyzstan
- Lucknow, India
- Maha Sarakham, Thailand
- Mumbai, India
- Murray-Darling, Australia
- Northern Mindanao, Philippines
- Okayama, Japan
- Penang, Malaysia
- Pune, India
- Shangri-la, China
- Pacific Island Countries
- Southern Vietnam
- Srinagar, India
- Tasmania, Australia
- Thiruvananthapuram, India
- Tianjin, China
- Tirupati, India
- Tongyeong, Korea
- Trang, Thailand
- Ulju, Korea
- Waikato, New Zealand
- Yogyakarta, Indonesia
- Yokohama, Japan
