= Simon Brault =

Canadian arts administrator and cultural advocate

Simon Brault CC, OQ
- Born: September 5, 1955 (age 70); Montreal, Quebec, Canada
- Occupations: Arts administrator, author, cultural advocate
- Known for: CEO of the Canada Council for the Arts (2014–2023); cultural policy leadership
- Notable work: No Culture, No Future

Simon Brault, CC OQ (born 5 September 1955) is a Canadian arts administrator, cultural advocate, author, and former accountant. He is known for leading major cultural institutions, including as CEO and director of the Canada Council for the Arts from 2014 to 2023. Since 2024, he has been president of the Festival de Lanaudière. Brault previously directed the National Theatre School of Canada and played a central role in cultural advocacy in Montreal, including co-founding Culture Montréal and Journées de la culture. He is the author of No Culture, No Future (2010), a work promoting the democratization of culture. Brault made an Officer of the Order of Canada and promoted to Companion in 2025. He was also made an Officer of the Ordre national du Québec.

== Early life and family ==
Brault was born in Montreal, Quebec, and is the eldest of eight children. He grew up in the working-class neighbourhood of Villeray. His father, a painter and ceramicist who worked as a teacher, struggled to earn a living through his art, shaping Brault’s early perception of the challenges faced by artists. His uncle, poet Jacques Brault, provided a contrasting example of artistic success and influenced his appreciation of the arts.

== Education and early career ==
At age 20, Brault enrolled in law school but left after two and a half years to train as an accountant. After travelling to China, he returned to Montreal as a new father and sought work in the cultural sector. He joined the National Theatre School of Canada (NTS) after responding to a classified advertisement for a clerk position.
