= United Nations Decade of Education for Sustainable Development =

United Nations initiative

The Decade of Education for Sustainable Development (DESD) 2005–2014 was an Education for Sustainable Development (ESD) initiative of the United Nations. The Decade was delivered by UNESCO as lead agency, and gave rise to Regional Centres of Expertise (RCE) networks, and the GUPES universities' partnership. The launch of the United Nations Decade of Education for Sustainable Development started a global movement to reorient education to address the challenges of sustainable development. It was the first UN Decade to establish a global monitoring and evaluation process and expert group. Building on the achievement of the Decade, stated in the Aichi-Nagoya Declaration on ESD, UNESCO endorsed the Global Action Programme on ESD (GAP) in the 37th session of its General Conference. Acknowledged by UN general assembly Resolution A/RES/69/211 and launched at the UNESCO World Conference on ESD in 2014, the GAP aims to scale-up actions and good practices. UNESCO has a major role, along with its partners, in bringing about key achievements to ensure the principles of ESD are promoted through formal, non-formal and informal education.

International recognition of ESD as the key enabler for sustainable development is growing steadily. The role of ESD was recognized in three major UN summits on sustainable development: the 1992 UN Conference on Environment and Development (UNCED) in Rio de Janeiro, Brazil; the 2002 World Summit on Sustainable Development (WSSD) in Johannesburg, South Africa; and the 2012 UN Conference on Sustainable Development (UNCSD) in Rio de Janeiro. Other key global agreements such as the Paris Agreement (Article 12) also recognize the importance of ESD. Today, ESD is arguably at the heart of the 2030 Agenda for Sustainable Development and its 17 Sustainable Development Goals (SDGs) (United Nations, 2015). The SDGs recognize that all countries must stimulate action in the following key areas – people, planet, prosperity, peace and partnership – to tackle the global challenges that are crucial for the survival of humanity. Some of these SDGs include ensuring affordable and clean energy, providing clean water and sanitation, and partnership for these goals. ESD is explicitly mentioned in Target 4.7 of SDG4, which aims to ensure that all learners acquire the knowledge and skills needed to promote sustainable development and is understood as an important means to achieve all the other 16 SDGs. Additionally, SDG17 focuses on strengthening the means of implementation and revitalization of global partnership for sustainable development.

== About the Decade ==
Based on proposals by Japan and Sweden, the United Nations General Assembly, at its 57th Session in December 2002, adopted Resolution 57/254 to start the DESD, following the Johannesburg Plan of Implementation, which emphasised that education is an indispensable element for achieving sustainable development.

UNESCO was designated as lead agency for the Decade and developed a draft International Implementation Scheme for the DESD.

Along with the Millennium Development Goals (MDGs) process, the Education For All (EFA) movement, and the United Nations Literacy Decade (UNLD), the DESD also aimed to achieve an improvement in the quality of life, particularly for the most deprived and marginalised, fulfillment of human rights including gender equality, poverty reduction, democracy and active citizenship. Whereas the MDGs provide a set of tangible and measurable development goals within which education is a significant input and indicator; EFA focuses on ways of providing educational opportunities to everyone; and the UNLD concentrates on promoting the key learning tool for all forms of structured learning, DESD was concerned particularly with the content and purpose of education. In concept and design, ESD challenges all forms of educational provision to adopt practices and approaches which foster the values of sustainable development.

In response to the DESD, the United Nations University (UNU) called for the development of networks for the promotion of ESD, as well as being expertise centres for the research development of ESD. This was the birth of Regional Centres of Expertise (RCE) supporting education for sustainable development. Dr. Betsy Boze was instrumental in drafting and approval of the International Association of Universities "Iquitos statement on Higher Education for Sustainable Development."

The United Nations Environment Programme (UNEP) has facilitated the establishment of the Global Universities Partnership on Environment and Sustainability (GUPES) in 2012 as a flagship contribution to the UN DESD. The focus of GUPES is around three pillars: Education, Training and Network, and is based on the experience and scaling up of the successful Mainstreaming Environment and Sustainability in African Universities (MESA) project.

== See also ==
- Sustainable Development
- Education for Sustainable Development
- United Nations
