= Mark S. Bonham =

Mark S. Bonham (born 1959) is a Canadian investment manager, philanthropist, author, LGBTQ rights advocate and a Senior Fellow at Massey College.

== Early life and education ==
Bonham hails from Elliot Lake, Ontario. He holds a Bachelor of Commerce from the University of Toronto in 1982 and an M.Sc. in Economics from the London School of Economics in 1986. In 2024, he was awarded an honorary doctorate from Toronto Metropolitan University.

== Career ==
Bonham co-founded BPI Financial Corporation in 1986. BPI became publicly traded in 1991, and by his departure in 1995 was among Canada’s largest mutual fund companies. He then founded Strategic Value Corporation, which went public in 1996 and expanded through acquisitions before being sold in 2000. From 2003 to 2008, Bonham was president of Stoney Ridge Estate Winery. Bonham is a benefactor of Casey House and endowed the Mark S. Bonham Centre for Sexual Diversity Studies at the University of Toronto. He also funds scholarships at the Rotman School of Management. Since 2020, he has served as Executive Director of The Veritas Foundation. In 2024, he was appointed to the board of CreateTO, the City of Toronto’s real estate management agency, and joined the board of Human Rights Watch.
