= Roger Lewis =

Roger Lewis may refer to:

- Roger Lewis (biographer) (born 1960), Welsh academic, biographer and journalist
- Roger Lewis (American football) (born 1993), American football player
- Roger Lewis (businessman) (1912–1987), American business executive
- Roger K. Lewis (born 1941), American architect and urban planner

== See also ==
- Wm. Roger Louis (born 1936), American historian
