= Bert Crowfoot =

Canadian journalist and producer

Bert Cecil Crowfoot OC is a Canadian journalist, photographer and TV producer of Siksika and Saulteaux descent.

In 1983, Bert began publishing Windspeaker, a national magazine covering issues in the aboriginal community and he is the founder and CEO of the Aboriginal Multimedia Society of Alberta.

He established Alberta's first Aboriginal radio station, CFWE-FM, and he is the producer of the documentary series Quest of Buffalo Spirit.

He is the great-great-grandson of legendary Blackfoot chief Crowfoot.

He was made an Officer of the Order of Canada on December 31, 2025.
