= James Retallack =

Canadian-American historian (born 1955)

- Born: 2 July 1955; Montreal
- Education: St John's College
- Occupations: Historian, professor
- Employer: University of Toronto
- Awards: Guggenheim Fellowship (2015); Rhodes Scholarship (1978)

James N. Retallack (born July 2, 1955, in Montreal) is a Canadian historian.

== Life ==
Retallack studied history at Trent University in Peterborough, Ontario, until 1978 and subsequently as a Rhodes Scholar at the University of Oxford, where he earned his Ph.D. in 1983. He then received postdoctoral fellowships at Stanford University and the University of Alberta. In 1987, he was appointed to the University of Toronto, where he continues to hold a professorship in history.

Retallack's research and teaching focus on German and European history from 1740 to 1945. In 1993–94, he spent a year as a Humboldt Fellow at Freie Universität Berlin and served as a visiting professor at the university's Institute of Political Science. In 2002–03, he was a visiting professor at the University of Göttingen and won the Friedrich Wilhelm Bessel Research Prize. In 2011, he was elected a Fellow of the Royal Society of Canada. In 2014, he taught as a visiting professor at the University of Wuppertal.

== Awards ==
- 2025: Member of the Order of Canada.
- 2022: Faculty Research Fellow, Jackman Humanities Institute, University of Toronto.
- 2019: Appointment as University Professor, University of Toronto.
- 2017: Guggenheim Fellow.
- 2017: Hans Rosenberg Book Prize, Central European History Society.
- 2016: Hans Rosenberg Article Prize, Central European History Society.
- 2015: Killam Fellow (Canada).
- 2014: Fellow of the Royal Society of Canada.
- 2014: Friedrich-Wilhelm-Bessel Research Prize (Reinvitation) (University of Wuppertal).
- 2011: Fellow, Royal Society of Canada.
- 2002: Friedrich Wilhelm Bessel Research Prize.
- 2001: Friedrich-Wilhelm-Bessel Research Prize (University of Göttingen).
- 1998: Trans-Coop Research Fellowship.
- 1997: Research Fellowship (renewal) (FU Berlin).
- 1993: Research Fellowship (FU Berlin).
- 1978: Rhodes Scholar, Ontario and St. John's, Oxford University.

== Works ==
- Retallack, James (2023). Das rote Sachsen. Wahlen, Wahlrecht und politische Kultur im Deutschen Kaiserreich. Leipzig: Leipziger Universitätsverlag. ISBN 978-3-96023-472-2.
- ——————— (2022). German Social Democracy through British Eyes. A Documentary History, 1870–1914. Toronto: University of Toronto Press. ISBN 978-1-4875-2748-8.
- ——————— (2017). Red Saxony. Election Battles and the Spectre of Democracy in Germany, 1860–1918. Oxford: Oxford University Press. ISBN 978-0-19-966878-6.
- ——————— (2015). Germany's Second Reich. Portraits and pathways. Toronto: University of Toronto Press. ISBN 978-1-4426-2852-6.
- ——————— (2006). The German Right 1860–1920. Political Limits of the Authoritarian Imagination. Toronto / Buffalo / London: University of Toronto Press. ISBN 978-0-8020-9419-3.
- ——————— (1996). Germany in the Age of Kaiser Wilhelm II. Houndmills, Basingstoke, Hampshire: Macmillan Press. ISBN 0-333-59242-5.
- ———————; Jones, Larry Eugene (1992). Elections, Mass Politics, and Social Change in Modern Germany. New Perspectives. Cambridge: Cambridge University Press. ISBN 0-521-42912-9.
