= March of Dimes Canada =

- Abbreviation: MODC
- Formation: 1951
- Type: Registered Charity
- Registration no.: 10788 3928 RR0001
- Headquarters: 99 Duncan Mills Road, Toronto, Ontario, M3B 1Z2
- Official language: English and French
- President and CEO: Len Baker
- Subsidiaries: March of Dimes Canada's Non-Profit Housing Corporation
- Website: https://www.marchofdimes.ca

March of Dimes Canada (MODC), is a Canadian registered national charity founded in 1951. The current name was established in 2006 by Ontario March of Dimes. MODC provides community-based programming, employment supports, skills development, home and vehicle modifications and after stroke supports.

== Organization ==
March of Dimes Canada is headquartered in Toronto, Ontario, with additional offices in major Canadian cities such as Vancouver, Edmonton, Ottawa, Québec City and Halifax.

March of Dimes Canada has no affiliation with the American organization. Like its American counterpart, it began in 1951 with the Marching Mothers fundraising campaign to eradicate polio.

== History ==
March of Dimes Canada began during the fight against polio. In 1949, mothers across Canada joined a fundraising campaign, collecting donations door-to-door to support research for a cure. These volunteers became known as the Marching Mothers.

Their efforts helped fund important polio research, including the work of Dr. Jonas Salk, whose vaccine was introduced in 1955. As polio cases declined, the organization shifted its focus from finding a cure to supporting people living with disabilities.

Originally founded as the Canadian Foundation for Poliomyelitis in 1951, the organization expanded its services throughout the 1960s to assist adults with physical disabilities through rehabilitation, employment, and community support programs.
