= Association of Registered Interior Designers of Ontario =

Association of Registered Interior Designers of Ontario (ARIDO) is a self-regulatory professional organization for interior designers in Ontario, Canada. It is the only recognized professional organization for interior designers in Ontario. ARIDO has over 3,300 members who represent all areas of interior design, including corporate, residential, retail, hospitality, and institutional design.

== History ==
ARIDO was founded in 1934 as the Society of Interior Decorators of Ontario, then Interior Designers of Ontario (IDO). In 1984, IDO became the Association of Registered Interior Designers when the ARIDO Act was passed in the Legislature of Ontario. The Act was amended in 1999 to permit that only interior designers who meet ARIDO standards might use the title of "Interior Designer" in the Province.

== Requirement ==
As of December 23, 1999, in the province of Ontario, only those individuals who meet the strict qualifications confirmed by the government in Bill Pr6 are entitled to call themselves Interior Designers. The idea of giving legal standing to the designation of "Interior Designer", is said to give the title a new measure of respect that reflects the high degree of education, training and formal examination that professional Interior Designers undergo. By consolidating the designation of "Interior Designer," it is thought that it will enhance consumer protection by reducing confusion in the marketplace.

== Regulation ==
Only ARIDO members can legally use the designation of "Interior Designers", but there is no law to prevent unqualified individuals from practicing interior design nor is it a legal requirement to belong to ARIDO in order to offer interior design services. ARIDO members voluntarily join the association and agree to adhere to their standards of practice and code of ethics.

== See also ==
- Country bohemian style
- Ontario Real Estate Association
