= McGill School of Architecture =

Architecture school in Quebec, Canada

- Other name: Peter Guo-hua Fu School of Architecture
- Type: Architecture school
- Established: 1896; 130 years ago
- Founder: William Christopher Macdonald
- Parent institution: McGill Faculty of Engineering
- Director: David Theodore
- Faculty: 44
- Administrative staff: 7
- Students: 273 (Fall 2019)
- Undergraduates: 163 (Fall 2019)
- Postgraduates: 90 (Fall 2019)
- Doctoral students: 20
- Location: Macdonald-Harrington Building, Montreal, Quebec, H3A 2K6, Canada; 45.5053°N 73.5758°W
- Campus: Urban
- Language: English
- Accreditation: CACB; NCARB
- Website: mcgill.ca/architecture/

The Peter Guo-hua Fu School of Architecture, formerly the McGill School of Architecture, is one of eight academic units constituting the Faculty of Engineering at McGill University in Montreal, Quebec, Canada. Founded in 1896 by Sir William Macdonald, it offers accredited professional and post-professional programs ranging from undergraduate to PhD levels.

The School of Architecture is located inside the Macdonald-Harrington Building, designed by Sir Andrew Taylor, on the McGill University downtown campus. The School of Urban Planning, which became independent from the School of Architecture in 1970, occupies the fourth floor. The School of Architecture also operates many auxiliary facilities, including workshops, laser cutting and 3D-printing facilities, research labs and various libraries and collections both within the Macdonald-Harrington Building and elsewhere on McGill's campus. The school is accredited by the Canadian Architectural Certification Board (CACB) and is recognized in the United States by the National Council of Architectural Registration Boards (NCARB).

The Architecture Students' Association represents undergraduate students at the school and the Graduate Architecture Students' Association represents graduate and post-graduate students. All registered students automatically become members of these associations. The school also maintains a chapter of the American Institute of Architecture Students as well as bilateral exchange agreements with several architecture schools in other countries. As of Fall 2019, there were 163 undergraduate, 90 graduate and 20 PhD students enrolled.

On September 26, 2017, the school was renamed the Peter Guo-hua Fu School of Architecture following a C$12 million gift from architect and McGill graduate Peter Fu.

== History ==
McGill's School of Architecture, founded in 1896, is one of the oldest architecture schools in North America and the second to be established in Canada. Initially a Beaux-Arts style school based in the Arts and Crafts movement, it became a Bauhaus-based institution under new directorship after World War II. The school was the first in the country to offer a graduate planning program and a PhD in architecture.

=== Early history ===
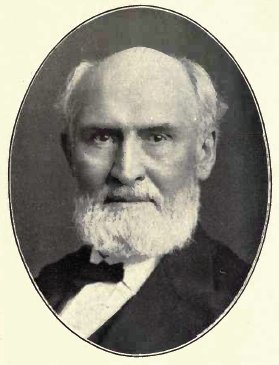
Sir William C. Macdonald, 4th Chancellor of McGill University, created a chair in architecture at McGill in 1896.

In 1890, the Province of Quebec Association of Architects adopted a constitution requiring compulsory examination for people in Quebec who wished to become professional architects. This created a need for more systematic architectural education, and the absence of such opportunities caused many aspiring Canadian architects to study in the United States, where ten architecture schools had already been established. Canada did not yet have any formal architectural education, and the only forms of architectural education in Montreal were periodical lectures by local practising architects at McGill's affiliated religious colleges. This new need for architectural education is an important factor that led to the founding of the School of Architecture at McGill University.

In 1896, Sir William C. Macdonald created a chair in architecture at McGill which was led by Stewart Henbest Capper, a former student at the École des Beaux-Arts in Paris. Macdonald also provided funds for the purchase and maintenance of the school's initial equipment. At this time, the school had two architecture studios which occupied two rooms of the top floor of the original Macdonald Engineering Building. The school offered a four-year course to prepare students for professional accreditation, and as it remains today, the first year was preparatory, with all courses taken jointly by architecture and engineering students. The first graduating class was composed of only three students, (Note: The first graduating class was composed of Frank Peder, George Taylor Hyde and Norman M. McLeod.) and Professor Capper gave all lectures in architecture, while Henry F. Armstrong, the only other full-time professor, taught art classes and modelling.

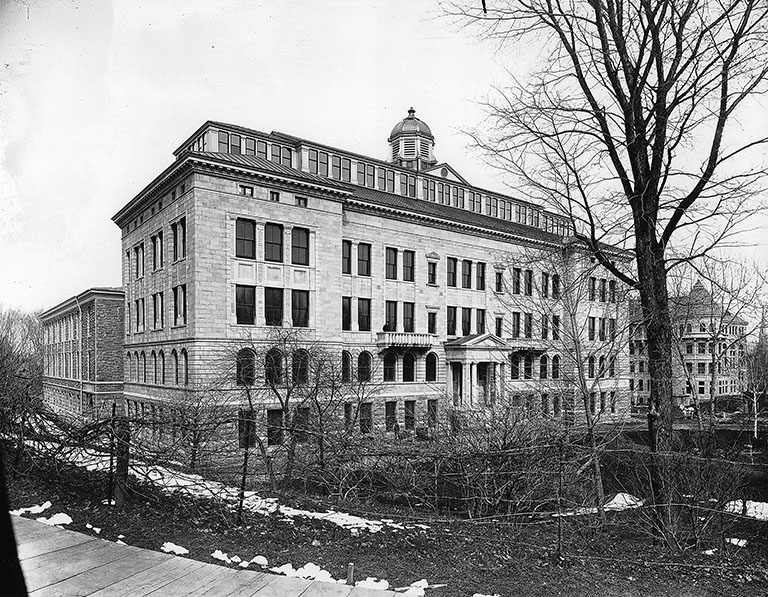
The old Macdonald Engineering Building, the School of Architecture's original home.

In 1903, Capper returned to England to establish the School of Architecture at Victoria University of Manchester, which was the fourth university architecture school to be established in the British Commonwealth, after University of Toronto (1890), University of Liverpool (1894) and McGill (1896). The second director of the school, Percy Nobbs, arrived at McGill in 1903 to only two students. Nobbs is credited with designing the McGill coat of arms three years into his tenure. As director, he divided the four-year course into two streams, the BArch degree and the BSc degree in Architectural Engineering. By 1906, he was teaching six classes, so he hired three new staff to assist him, including his former colleague Cecil Burgess. Nobbs believed students should be exposed to architecture in practice, and designed the McGill Union (today the McCord Museum) across from McGill's Roddick Gates. After the Macdonald Engineering Building burned down in 1907, Nobbs designed the new building in its place, and the School of Architecture moved to its ground floor. By 1912, the school had grown to eight students, and the next year, Philip J. Turner joined the faculty. In 1913, Ramsay Traquair became the new director. He is credited with designing the McGill flag, which he presented to the university in 1921 and has since flown above the Arts Building.

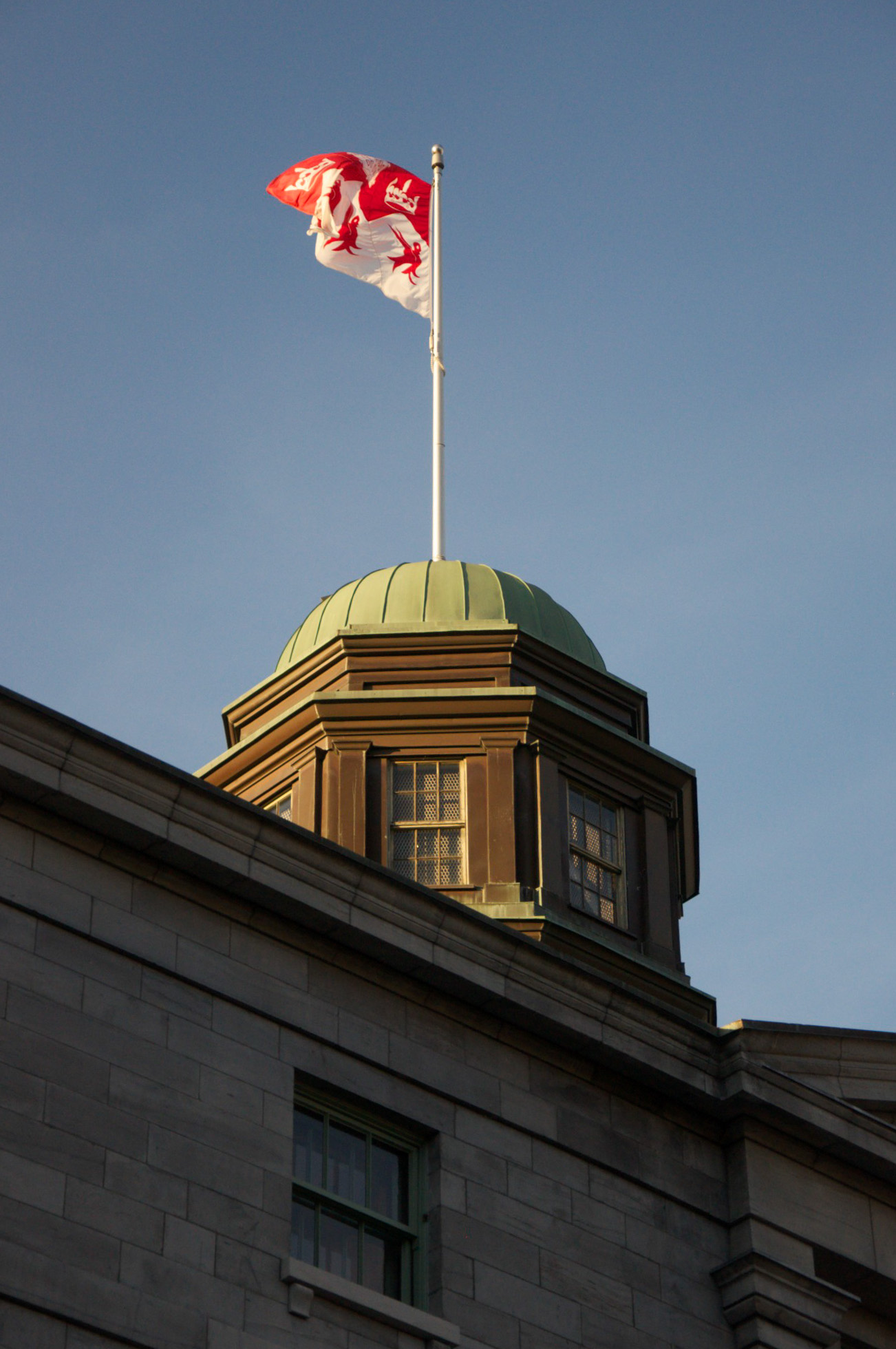
The McGill flag, designed by Ramsay Traquair and presented to McGill in 1921, flown above the Arts Building.

==== World War I ====
At the onset of World War I, many faculty and students were called to war. Nobbs attained the military rank of major, while twelve of his students did not return. Four among these students have tributes named in their honour at McGill, including Gordon H. Blackader, for whom the Blackader-Lauterman Library is named, Hugh McLennan, namesake of the Hugh McLennan Memorial Travelling Scholarship, Murdoch Laing, of the Murdoch Laing Prize and John Louis Robertson, of the Louis Robertson Book Prize. In addition to the aforementioned four, eight other McGill architects were added to the Roll of Honour of World War I. (Note: McGill architects who fell during World War I include Gunner A.I. Richardson (Arch. '11), Robert W.S. Robertson (Arch. '16), Private Allen D. Harvey (Arch. '17), Private Archibald McLeod (Arch. '15), Lieutenant George D. McLeod (Arch. '15), Lieutenant Clarke H. Popham (Arch. '17) and Captain Benjamin B. McConkey (Arch. '14).) Another seven graduates returned from the war as distinguished soldiers, with one receiving the Distinguished Service Order, four the Military Cross and two the French Croix de Guerre. (Note: McGill graduates who distinguished themselves in service to Canada during World War I were Major Walter C. Hyde (Arch. '15), who received the Distinguished Service Order, Lieutenants S.M. Sproule (Arch. '12), W.A.I. Anglin (Arch. '16), K.G. Blackader (Arch.'19) and G.A. Birks (Arch. '19), who received the Military Cross and Lieutenants P.E. Amos (Arch. '19) and H.P. Illsley (Arch. '17), recipients of the Croix de Guerre of France.)

==== Post-war ====
After the war, Nobbs continued to teach many classes. In 1920, Ernest Cormier joined the faculty for one year to teach design and the next year, Traquair organized the school's first "sketching school" in Quebec City, a tradition that has been carried on annually to various destinations since as a credited course. Arthur Lismer, a member of the Group of Seven, taught this course at the school for over a decade even after his retirement in 1955.

In 1939, Turner succeeded Traquair, who had completed a 26-year tenure as director. At this time, McGill Principal Lewis Williams Douglas considered discontinuing the architecture program due to low enrollment; however he faced a great deal of backlash from Turner and several famous architects from Montreal, and eventually abandoned the idea. Under Turner's tenure, support for co-education was made, and in 1943 Catherine Mary Wisnicki became the first woman to graduate from the school. Wisnicki was the fourth woman member of the Ontario Association of Architects and the second to join the Architectural Institute of British Columbia.

=== Mid-century ===
Following the retirement of Turner as director of the School of Architecture, John Bland became director in 1941. In 1945, a new five-year program was adopted for the next two decades. After the Second World War, the School of Architecture increased its staff and doubled its physical accommodation due to the surge in university enrollment. This required the school to briefly use McGill's Dawson College, a satellite campus in St. Jean, Quebec, to accommodate its students. By 1947, the school had become so cramped that a repurposed building on University Street was vacated to make room for the school's students. This new building expanded the school's physical size immensely, and enrollment grew to 133 full-time students by the 1949–1950 academic year. At the same time as the school's relocation, Professor Frederic Lasserre left the school to establish a new architecture school at the University of British Columbia. (Note: McGill Architecture graduates Catherine Mary Wisnicki, Peter Oberlander and Arthur Erickson became teachers at Lasserre's new school in its formative years.) Lasserre's resignation, coupled with the new influx of students at the school resulted in the hiring of several new faculty members, which included Robert Esdaile and Harold Spence-Sales.

In 1946, Spence-Sales became associate professor of design, and he and Bland established the first post-graduate architecture and planning program in Canada. Beginning in this academic year, the professional program was extended to six years, with first-year students following the engineering curriculum. During the early 1950s, three new teachers were added to the faculty, including Hazen Sise and Guy Desbarats who later founded Arcop with Fred Lebensold, Ray Affleck, and Dimitri Dimakopoulos – all former students or teachers of the school.

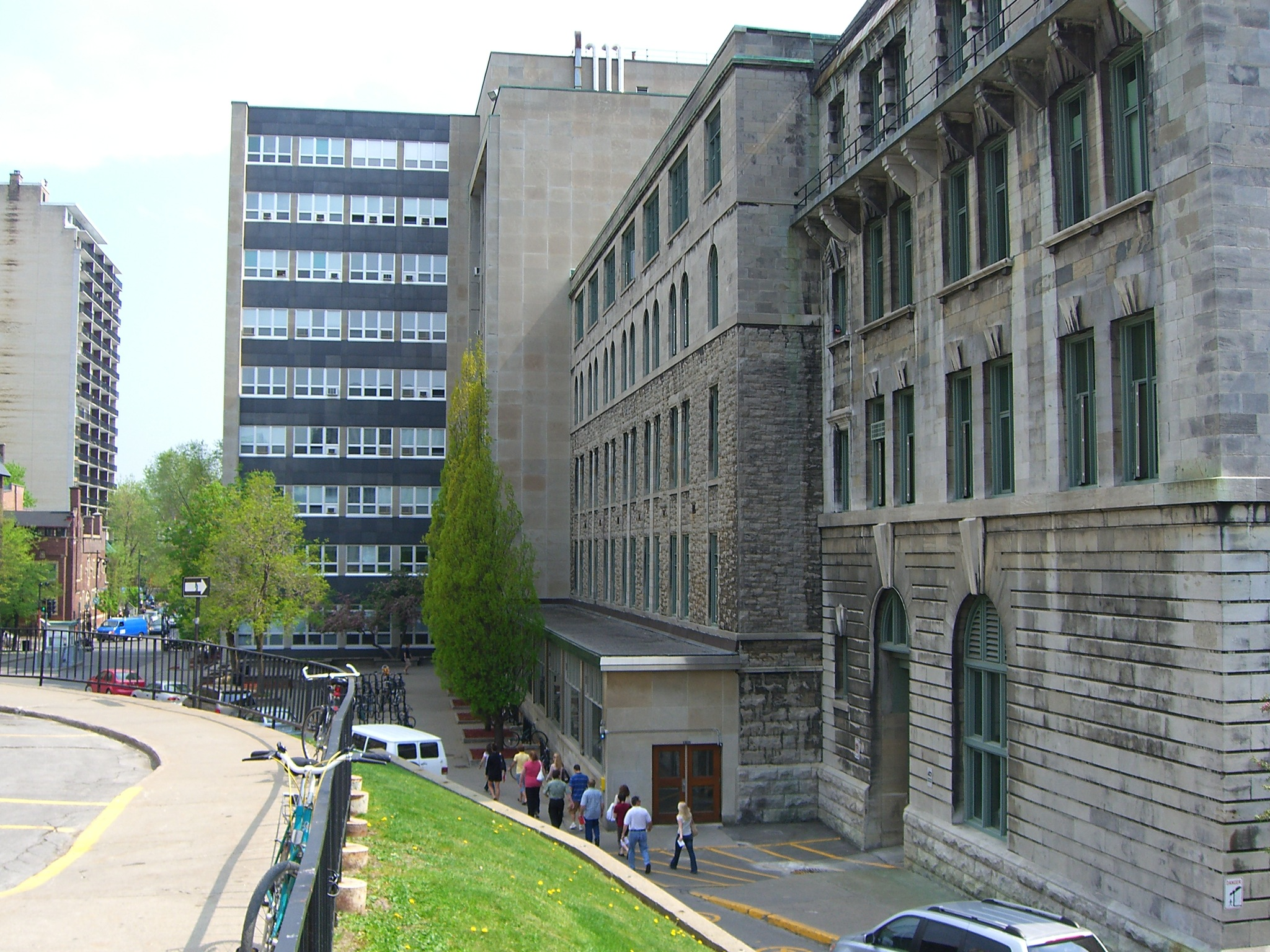
The McConnell Engineering Building in 2007, home to the school from 1959 until 1987.

In January 1958, the school was temporarily relocated to two townhouses on McTavish Street when the University Street building was demolished for the construction of the McConnell Building. On November 30, 1959, the new building was inaugurated and the School of Architecture moved to its north-eastern wing, where it remained for decades. Enrollment was steady during the 1950s due to the limitations of physical space, but after the McConnell Building underwent a four-story expansion in the 1960s enrollment grew again.

In 1961, McGill Professor Douglas Shadbolt left the school to found the first architecture program at the Nova Scotia Technical College (later known as Technical University of Nova Scotia [TUNS]) in Halifax, and 8 years later founded the School of Architecture (later the Azrieli School of Architecture and Urbanism) at Carleton University in Ottawa, Ontario. In 1966, John C. Parkin and Harry Mayerovitch joined the faculty as visiting professors. In the following years, Ray Affleck, Fred Lebensold, Andre Vecsei, Warren Chalk and Moshe Safdie also became visiting professors.

In the late 1960s, the six-year architecture program became a four-year program with the introduction of CEGEPs in Quebec.

=== 1970–present ===
In 1970, Spence-Sales retired from the faculty. Later that year, the graduate planning program was restructured by Professor David Farley, which resulted in the establishment of the independent School of Urban Planning. Over the next decade and a half, the school changed directorship three times, with Professor Norbert Schoenauer heading the school from 1972 until 1975, Professor Derek Drummond from 1975 until 1985 and Professor Bruce Anderson in 1985.

In 1987, the school moved from the Engineering building to the Macdonald-Harrington Building. Macdonald-Harrington was initially named the Macdonald Chemistry Building but was renamed after Bernard Harrington, the building's first chemistry professor. The building is one of the many donations made by Sir William Macdonald and was designed by Sir Andrew Taylor for the Departments of Chemistry and Mining in 1896. The building was renovated for the architecture and urban planning departments by Arcop in 1987.

In 1989, the School of Architecture's PhD program was introduced. In 1990, Derek Drummond returned for another six years as the school's director, replaced by Professor David Covo in 1996. In 1997, the PhD program was officially approved by the Minister of Education as the first in Canada, and the school had its first PhD graduate, Lily Chi. In 1999, the professional BArch degree was replaced by the new MArch I professional degree, leaving the BSc in architecture as the only undergraduate architecture degree. Two years later, the school graduated its first class in the MArch I program.

In 2003, philanthropist David Azrieli endowed an annual lecture at the school, called the David J. Azrieli Lecture Series. In 2005, McGill Architecture graduate Gerald Sheff endowed the Gerald Sheff Visiting Professorship in Architecture faculty position, which enabled the recruitment of leading individuals in architecture to teach at the school. The first appointee in 2006 was Dan Hanganu, and subsequent hires include John Shnier (the first Canadian to win the Prix de Rome in Architecture), Steve Badanes, Atelier TAG, Matthew Lella (partner at Diamond Schmitt Architects), and Gilles Saucier.

After an 11-year tenure as director, Covo stepped down and Professor Michael Jemtrud became director of the school in 2007. The next year, Jemtrud founded the Facility for Architectural Research in Media and Mediation (FARMM) at the School of Architecture with more than $1 million in funding from the Canada Foundation for Innovation. FARMM produced many award-winning projects and serves as the research hub for the school.

In 2011, Professor Annmarie Adams became the first woman director of the School of Architecture. From 2015 to 2021, the director was Professor Martin Bressani. Since September 2021, the director has been Professor David Theodore.

=== Directors ===
Director	Tenure
Stewart Henbest Capper	1896–1903
Percy Nobbs	1903–1913
Ramsay Traquair	1913–1939
Philip J. Turner	1939–1941
John Bland	1941–1972
Norbert Schoenauer	1972–1975
Derek Drummond	1975–1985
Bruce Anderson	1985–1990
Derek Drummond	1990–1996
David Covo	1996–2007
Michael Jemtrud	2007–2011
Annmarie Adams	2011–2015
Martin Bressani	2015–2021
David Theodore	2021–present

== Buildings and resources ==
=== Macdonald-Harrington Building ===
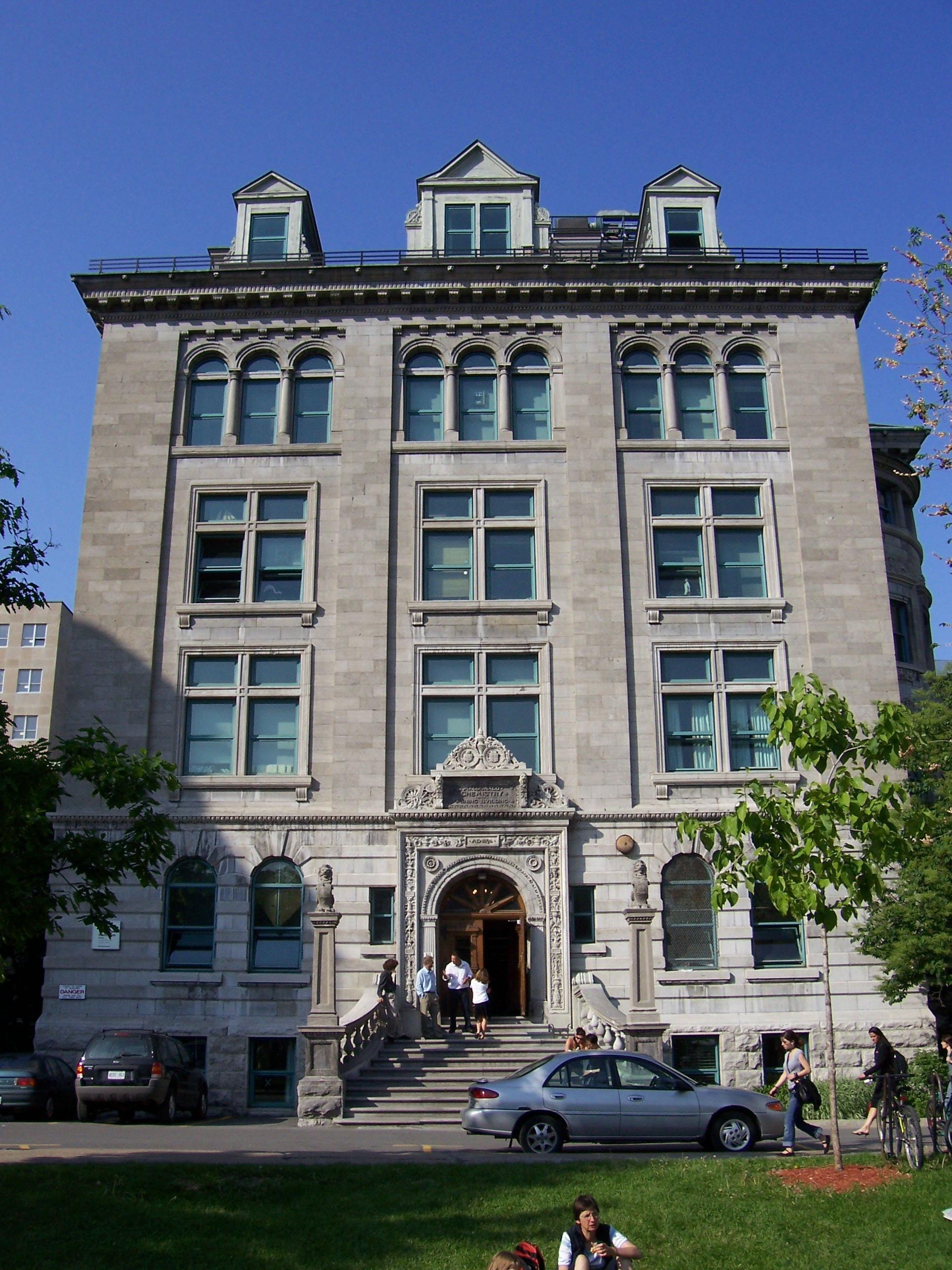
The Macdonald-Harrington Building, home to the McGill School of Architecture since 1987.

The Macdonald-Harrington Building is the home of the Peter Guo-hua School of Architecture, and also contains the School of Urban Planning on the fourth level. As architecture students progress through the years of the undergraduate program, they move through the design studios as well, with each year's respective studio located on a different level of the Macdonald-Harrington Building. The Master's studios are located on the top level, while the PhD studios are located on the same level as the first-year undergraduate studios and the school's administration. The ground level, which can be accessed from the Frank Dawson Adams (FDA) building, contains the lecture hall known as "G-10", which hosts the school's lecture series. The ground floor also contains the Architecture Students' Association (ASA) Supply Store where students can purchase drafting kits, as well as the architecture student lounge, known as the "Cellar", which is accessible 24/7 to architecture students. The first floor, above the ground level, contains the second-year undergraduate studio as well as three "crit rooms", where project critiques are given, and the largest among them the "exhibition room" due to its common hosting of exhibitions of students' and outside guests' work. The third-year undergraduate studios are located on the third floor of Macdonald-Harrington.

==== Workshop ====
The multi-level workshop is located in the basement and ground floor of the Macdonald-Harrington building, and provides students with their model-making needs. The workshop contains various equipment and power tools for working with wood, plaster, glass, acrylics and metal, and also contains other facilities, including a fumehood for sandblasting, spray painting, casting and mould-making. Workshop facilities include a Laser Cutting Room with three Universal Laser Cutter machines that students can use free-of-charge to cut and engrave acrylic, MDF, wood, styrene and other sheet materials. The workshop also includes 3D-printing machines, two of which are located inside the third-year studios on the third floor.

McGill University as a whole has a 3D-printing hub called "the Cube" which offers 3D-printing services to McGill students.

==== Media Centre ====
The Media Centre is located in the Macdonald-Harrington building and is available exclusively to architecture students, faculty and staff at McGill. The Centre includes a traditional dark room for developing film photographs, a photography studio/light room for students to photograph their work as well as a printing room with multiple large format printers and scanners. The Media Centre also lends out digital cameras, lenses, tripods and light tents to students.

==== FARMM ====
The Facility for Architectural Research in Media and Mediation (FARMM) is the research hub of the McGill School of Architecture, located on the first floor of the Macdonald-Harrington Building. Founded in 2008 with funding from the Canada Foundation for Innovation, FARMM connects students and researchers with colleagues internationally, and provides modern infrastructure for simulation, imaging, and fabrication.

=== Libraries and collections ===
==== John Bland Canadian Architecture Collection ====
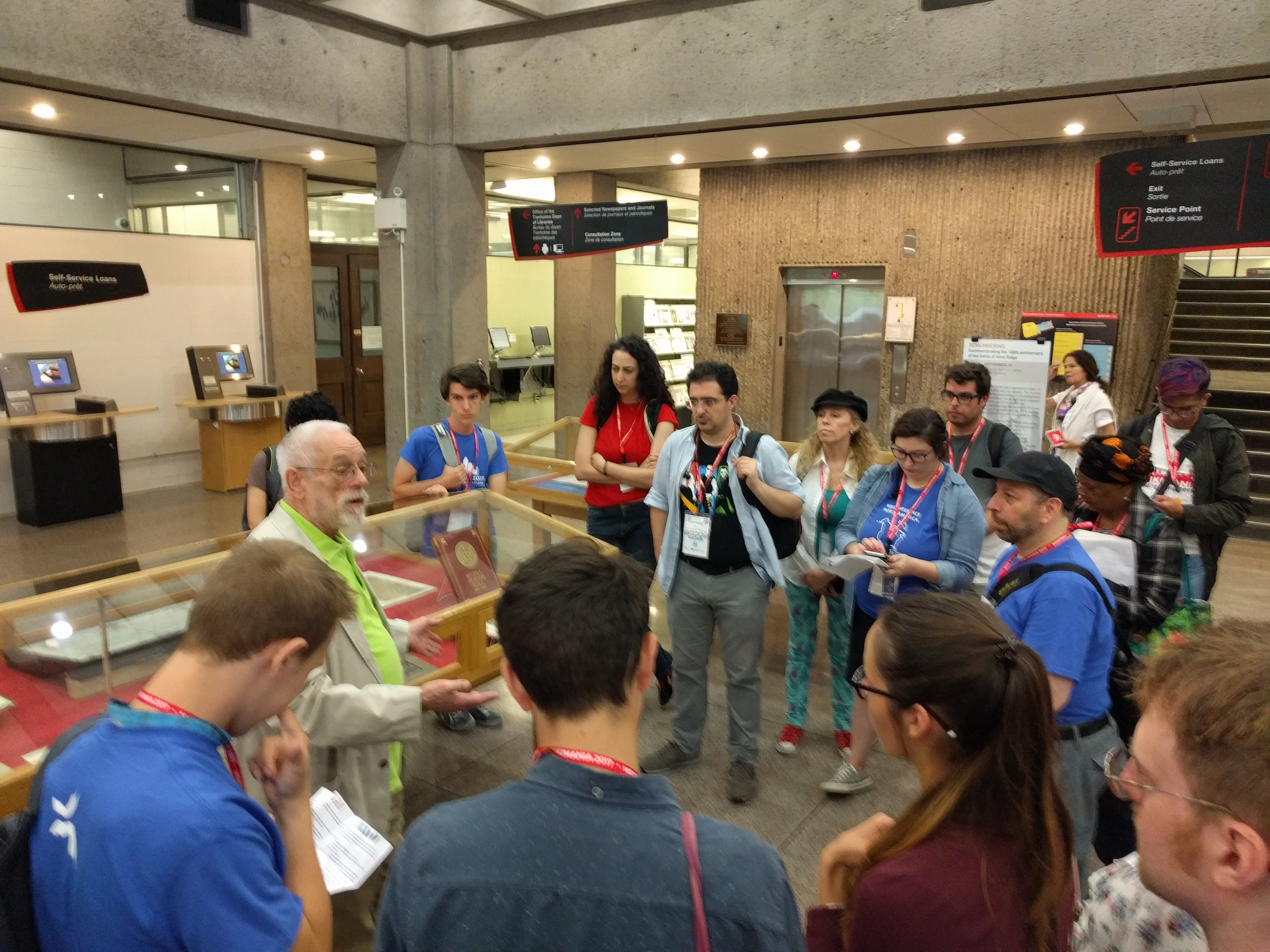
Tour of the CAC, 2017

The Canadian Architecture Collection (CAC) is one of the McGill Libraries' Special Collections. It is located on the fourth floor of the Redpath Library building. Students and professors at the Schools of Architecture and Urban Planning are required to document their work and entrust it with the Canadian Architecture Collection for safe-keeping, and several Canadian architects also bequeath their archives to the collection.

As of 2020, the Collection consisted of over 200,000 drawings, photographs, slides, models and maps as well as 400 metres of papers of nineteenth- and twentieth-century architects in Canada. The largest fond of major Canadian architects is that of Moshe Safdie, who donated his archives to the collection with an ongoing bequest since 1990. The CAC also includes at least 770 papers from the course "History of Architecture in Canada".

==== Architecture Slide Library ====
The Architecture Slide Library contains more than 40,000 images, of which nineteenth- and twentieth-century images are the most heavily used. They are now part of the John Bland Canadian Architecture Collection.

==== Orson Wheeler Architectural Model Collection ====
The Orson Wheeler Architectural Model Collection contains over two hundred scale architectural models of structures from around the world. The models were created out of Roma Plastilina between 1940 and 1990 by Orson Wheeler, a sculptor and former professor at McGill's School of Architecture.

A small collection of 40 works are on display in the front vestibule of the Macdonald-Harrington building.

==== Blackader-Lauterman Library of Architecture and Art ====
The Blackader-Lauterman Library of Architecture and Art is the university's parent library for the Schools of Architecture and Urban Planning, and is located on the upper floor of the Humanities and Social Sciences Library.

The library was established through a donation from the family of Gordon H. Blackader, one of the first students to study at the School of Architecture who died during World War I. The library was renamed the Blackader-Lauterman Library of Architecture and Art during the 1940s after the family of sculptor Dinah Lauterman made a donation to the university in her memory.

The library contains over 79,000 monographs and journal subscriptions, and has a substantial collection of over 3000 rare books from 1511 to 2009 housed in the Rare Books and Special Collections Library at McGill. This includes a collection of original works by Vitruvius, Palladio, and G. B. Piranesi, among others.

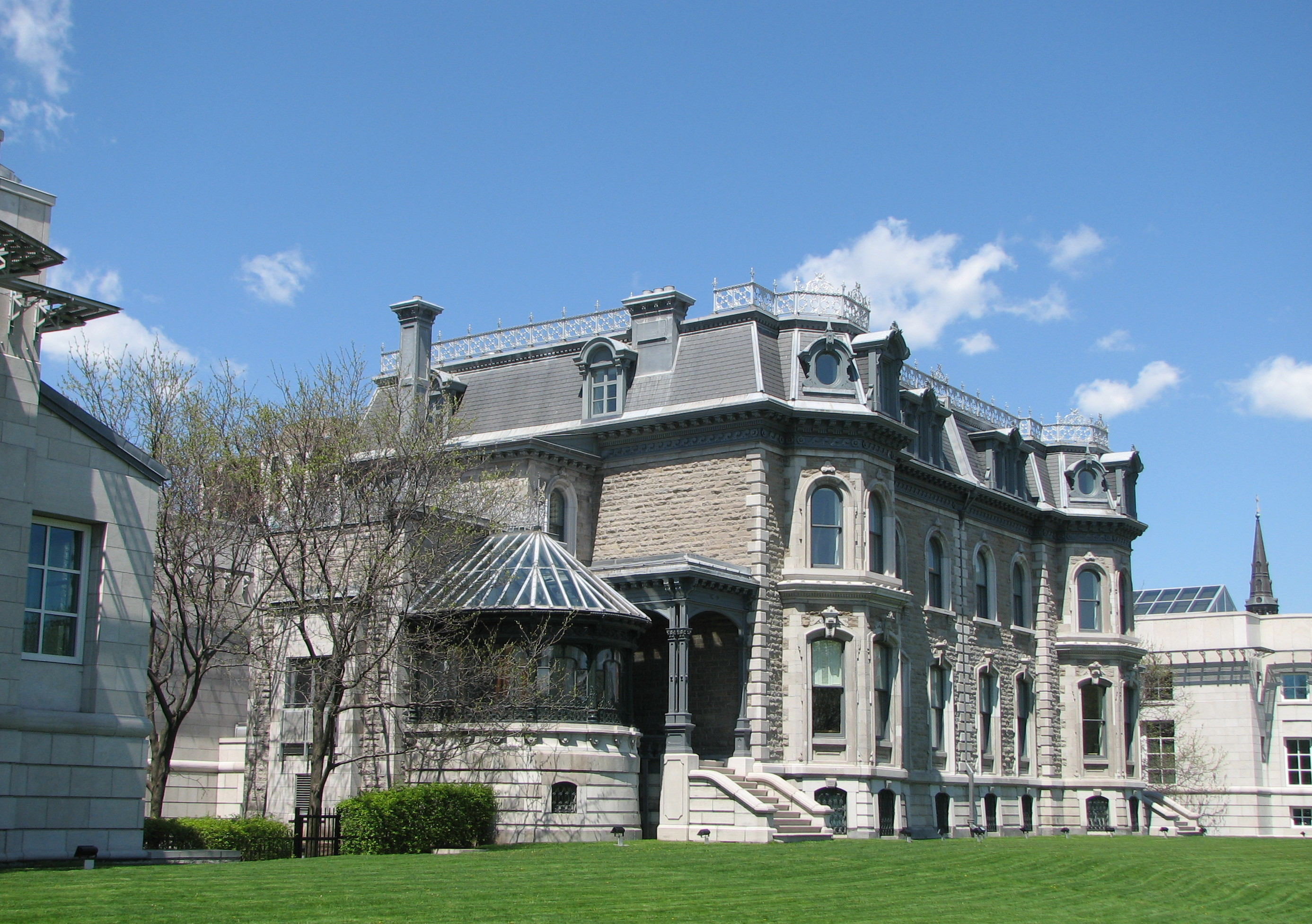
Canadian Centre for Architecture, view of Shaughnessy House.

=== Partnerships ===
==== Canadian Centre for Architecture ====
The School of Architecture maintains ties with the Canadian Centre for Architecture (CCA), which houses one of the largest architectural design collections in the world, a 20-minute walk away from the downtown campus. The CCA collaborates regularly with the school, and together organized the 2019 CCA Interuniversity Charrette which took place over a week in November and involved more than 10 universities in Canada.

== Organization and administration ==
The School of Architecture reports to the Dean of the McGill Faculty of Engineering. Due to its small size, the school is attached to the Faculty of Engineering for administrative purposes, but stands apart from the engineering departments and is headed by a director rather than a chair. As of 2020, the school's faculty consists of 44 academic staff and seven administrative and technical staff. The current director is Professor Martin Bressani. As of 2018, student to faculty ratios fall between 12:1 and 15:1 for design studios, as established by the Canadian Architectural Certification Board (CACB). Students are often employed as part-time assistants to allow for greater access to facilities within the school.

The school has been the recipient of several endowments, including over 50 scholarships and awards, over a dozen fellowships, several lecture series and a C$1 million donation from Gluskin Sheff + Associates in 2005, subsequently matched by the school in 2008 to fund the annual Gerald Sheff Visiting Professorship in Architecture. On September 26, 2017, the school was the recipient of a $12 million gift from Chinese architect and McGill graduate Peter Guo-hua Fu, which resulted in the renaming of the school. According to the CACB, approximately $500,000 of this donation is being employed annually outside of the school's base operating budget.

== Academics ==
The School of Architecture offers a professional program in Architecture comprising a Bachelor of Science in architecture (BSc[Arch]) and professional Master of Architecture (MArch) degree, as well as post-professional graduate programs leading to a Doctor of Philosophy (PhD) and post-professional Master of Architecture (MArch) degree.

=== Professional programs ===
- BSc(Arch) – 3 years, 100 credits
- MArch (Professional):
  - Design Studio – 1.5 years, 45 credits, or
  - Design Studio (Directed Research) – 2 years, 60 credits

In Canada, the MArch (Professional) degree is accredited by the Canadian Architectural Certification Board (CACB), and is recognized in the United States by the National Council of Architectural Registration Boards (NCARB).

=== Post-professional research programs ===
- MSc (Non-Thesis)
- PhD

=== Admissions ===
The McGill School of Architecture has the smallest undergraduate entering class of any architecture school in Canada, as well as one of the smallest professional Master of Architecture programs. With a maximum capacity of 48 undergraduate students in the first year undergraduate studio (BSc[Arch]) and 35 students in both of the Master's (MArch 1 and MArch II) studios, the school has one of the most selective and competitive sets of program offerings in the country with one of the lowest overall application-to-acceptance ratios.

Generally, about 5–10 students from outside Quebec who plan to study architecture for their undergraduate degree will spend their first year at McGill in "U0", taking the necessary engineering prerequisites required for the 3-year BSc (Architecture) program at the School of Architecture. Students coming from Quebec CEGEPs enter directly into the BSc (Architecture) program, or first-year undergraduate (U1), but are required to have received a DEC in either pure and applied science or health sciences, as these degrees fulfill the engineering prerequisites for the Architecture program.

Offers of acceptance into the program are based on a unique review process including an evaluation of a portfolio of works and extracurricular involvement, in addition to grades. In the 2010–2011 academic year, there were 687 applications with portfolios to the undergraduate BSc Architecture program with only 51 spaces, giving an overall applications to enrolments ratio of 7.42%. As of 2018, the number of spaces has been reduced to 48. With the exception of the new Bioengineering degree at McGill, for Quebec CEGEP students, admissions to the School of Architecture represent the highest average R score of students accepted into the Faculty of Engineering however in contrast to the high average R score, the lowest score admitted can sometimes be closer to the engineering average due to the importance of the portfolio in the admissions process.

Each year, the Master's program receives over 200 applicants, of which approximately 35 are admitted. Generally, about half of these students obtain their undergraduate degree from McGill, either from the BSc (Arch) program or another at the university.

The School of Architecture has one of the highest percentages of women representation at McGill, with an overall ratio of female-to-male students of approximately 2:1. As of fall 2019, there were 119 female and 44 male undergraduate students, and 54 female and 36 male graduate students enrolled at the school.

== Student life ==
=== Student associations ===
==== Architecture Students' Association (ASA) ====
The Architecture Students' Association (ASA) is a society within the School of Architecture that is not-for-profit and student-run. The society represents all undergraduate students in the School of Architecture, organizes student activities and affairs and speaks for students regarding issues at McGill. The ASA is chaired by the President and run by a council of six vice-president portfolios: Academic, Internal, External, Administration, Finance and Student Life. A student representative from each undergraduate year is also elected to sit on the council.

Part of the ASA's mandate is to maintain the ASA Supply Store where students can purchase drafting kits as well as the architecture lounge, also known as the "Cellar". Since 2011, the ASA has been part of the Engineering Undergraduate Society (EUS) at McGill, and is also a member of the Canadian Architecture Students' Association (CASA).

==== Graduate Architecture Students' Association (GASA) ====
The McGill Graduate Architecture Students' Association (GASA) is a student-run society representing all graduate students at the School of Architecture. GASA is known to hold "Late Night" events on Thursdays, popular among students from all programs in the school.

==== American Institute of Architecture Students (AIAS) ====
As of 2019, the School of Architecture has established a chapter of the American Institute of Architecture Students, an international, non-profit, student-run organization dedicated to providing progressive programs, information and resources on critical issues to architecture students.

=== Exchange and Study Abroad ===
The Peter Guo-hua Fu School of Architecture has close ties to several architecture schools across the world and has formal bilateral exchange agreements on a departmental level with seven schools in particular, including The Royal Danish Academy of Fine Arts in Copenhagen, Politecnico di Milano in Milan, Tongji University in Shanghai, École Nationale Supérieure d'Architecture de Paris-Belleville, École nationale supérieure d'architecture de Grenoble, Université catholique de Louvain in Brussels and TU Wien in Vienna. These bilateral agreements make it easy for undergraduate architecture students at McGill to go on exchange.

Students can also spend an exchange semester abroad at any of McGill University's 160+ partner institutions as long as they offer architecture exchanges, however these are more difficult to coordinate due to the competitive nature of university-wide exchanges.

=== Field trips and educational travel projects ===
The McGill School of Architecture routinely organizes field trips and educational travel projects that provide students with experiential learning opportunities to examine and document significant buildings and urban sites. Through the Summer Sketching School, students participate in annual trips to different cities, where they study the built environment through on-site observation and drawing exercises. In the 2010s and 2020s, students travelled to Canadian cities such as Quebec City, Baie-Saint-Paul, Lunenburg, and Saint John to document and study the cities' historic architecture. Students also participate in local site visits in Montreal; for instance, during Muslim Awareness Week in 2025, students visited the Lebanese Islamic Center to learn about Islamic architecture and the needs of Muslim communities in Quebec as part of a project on mosque design and the role of religious spaces.

== Lecture series ==
Each year, the School of Architecture presents public lectures, exhibitions and symposia showcasing leading architects and important figures in the field. These lectures are organized by various individuals and organizations affiliated with the school. Lecture Series include lunchtime "Brown Bag" lectures organized by the McGill Architecture Students' Association, evening lectures sponsored by local Montreal firms such as Provencher Roy & NEUF Architect(e)s, and most notably, the annual David J. Azrieli Lecture in Architecture which has brought in starchitects from all over the world since 2003, including seven Pritzker Prize laureates. (Note: Lecturers at McGill who have won the Pritzker Prize include Carme Pigem, David Adjaye, Thom Mayne, Shigeru Ban, Paulo Mendes da Rocha, Glenn Murcutt and Jacques Herzog.)

=== Notable lecturers ===
- Douglas Cardinal (2019–2020)
- Carme Pigem (2018–2019)
- Odile Decq (2018–2019)
- Brigitte Shim & Howard Sutcliffe (2017–2018)
- David Adjaye (2016–2017)
- Adam Caruso (2015–2016)
- Bruce Kuwabara (2014–2015)
- Bjarke Ingels (2013–2014)
- Jürgen Mayer (2012–2013)
- Thom Mayne (2011–2012)
- Shigeru Ban (2010–2011)
- Gregory Henriquez (2010–2011)
- Peter Eisenman (2009–2010)
- Michael Rotondi (2008–2009)
- Moshe Safdie (2007–2008)
- Nanako Umemoto (2007–2008)
- Paulo Mendes da Rocha (2006–2007)
- Glenn Murcutt (2005–2006)
- Daniel Libeskind (2004–2005)
- Jack Diamond (2004–2005)
- Will Alsop (2002–2003, 2004–2005)
- Steven Holl (2003–2004)
- Jacques Herzog (2002–2003)

== Notable alumni and faculty ==
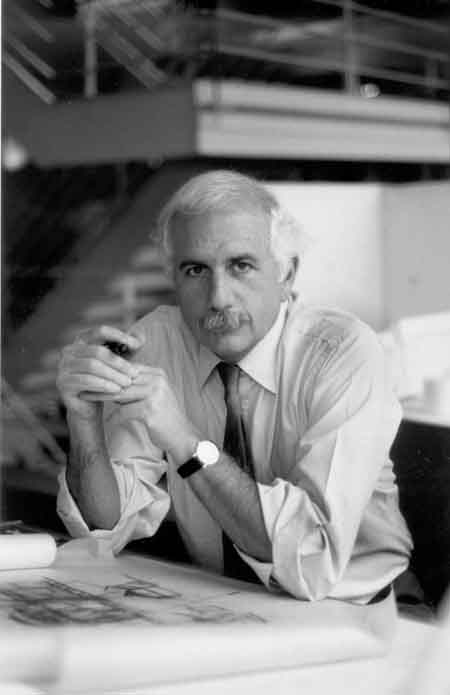
Moshe Safdie, architect of Marina Bay Sands and Habitat 67, which was originally conceived in his Master's thesis at McGill in 1961.

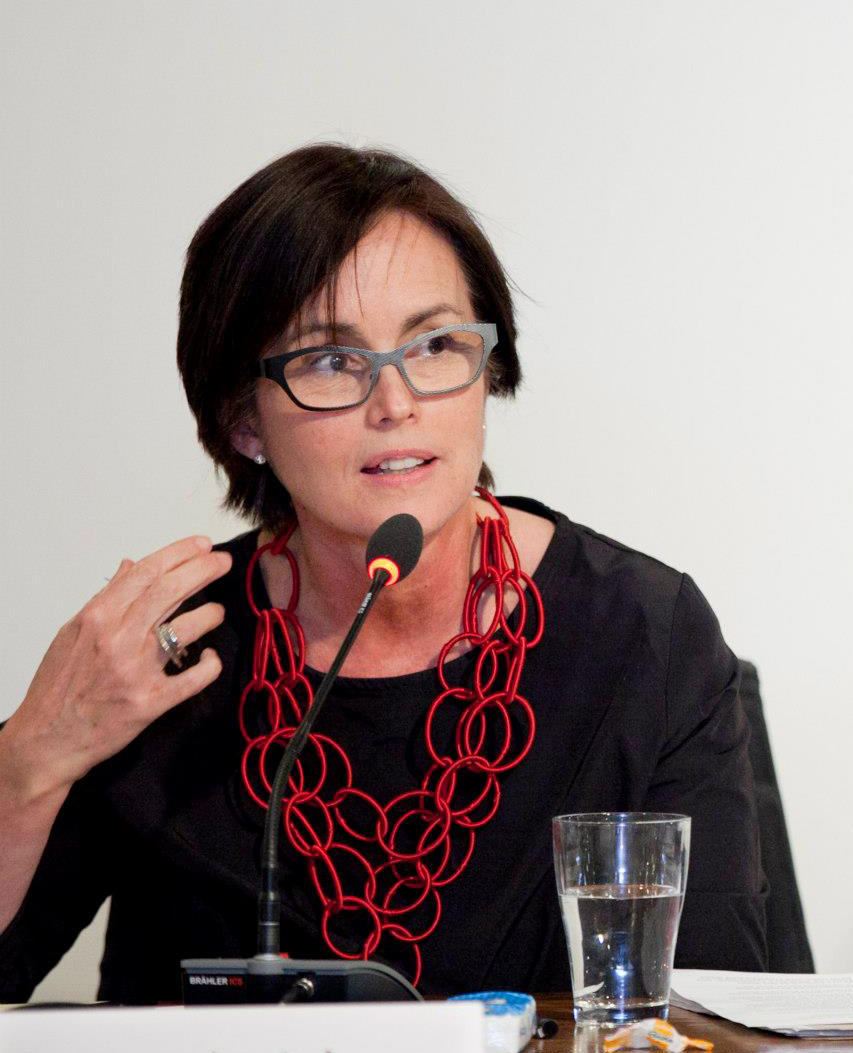
Annmarie Adams, architectural historian and current professor and former director of the school.

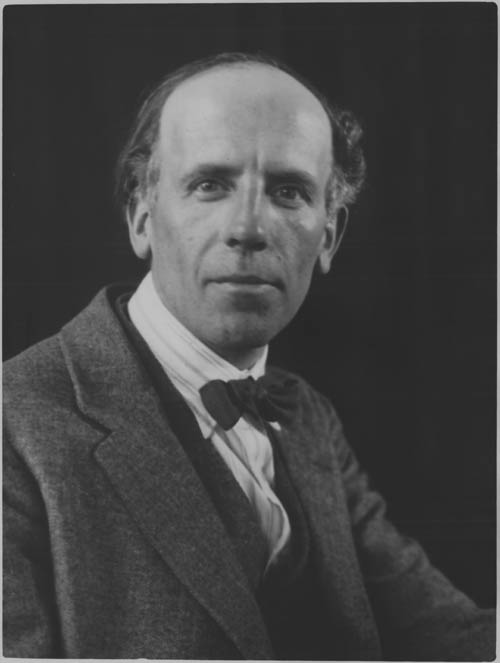
Arthur Lismer, a member of the Group of Seven, taught History of Art and Theory of Design, Freehand Drawing and Sketching School at the School of Architecture.

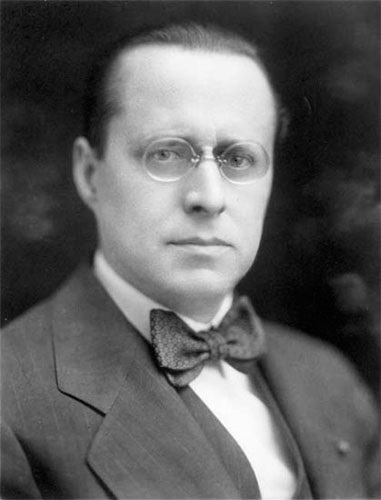
Ernest Cormier, renowned Art Deco architect, taught from 1919 to 1920.

=== Alumni ===
- Adam Caruso (BArch 1986) – co-founder of Caruso St John, Stirling Prize winner
- Alexandre Trudeau – filmmaker, journalist, founding member of the Pierre Elliott Trudeau Foundation
- Alina Payne (BArch 1977) – professor of History of Art and Architecture at Harvard University
- Amale Andraos (BArch 1996) – founder of New York-based architecture firm WORKac
- Arthur Erickson (BArch 1950) – architect of Robson Square, the Canadian Embassy and Roy Thompson Hall
- Blanche van Ginkel (BArch 1945) – first woman to head a faculty of architecture in Canada and be awarded a fellowship by the RAIC
- Catherine Chard Wisnicki (B. Arch. 1943) – first woman architecture graduate at McGill and one of the first women registered architects in Canada
- Dimitri Dimakopoulos (BArch 1955) – of Affleck, Desbarats, Dimakopoulos, Lebensold, Sise, designed Place Ville-Marie and 1000 de La Gauchetiere
- Dorice Walford (MArch 1958) – one of the first Canadian women in architecture to specialize in designing buildings for institutions
- Frances Bronet (BSc[Arch] 1977, BArch 1978) – president of the Pratt Institute in Brooklyn, New York
- Gavin Affleck (BArch 1985) – architect and son of Ray Affleck
- Gregory Henriquez (MArch History & Theory program 1988) – Vancouver-based architect
- Guy Desbarats (BArch 1948) – co-founder of Montreal-based architectural firm Arcop
- Harold Lea Fetherstonhaugh (BArch 1909) – architect of many buildings on McGill's campus, including Douglas Hall and William and Henry Birks Building
- Harry Mayerovitch (BArch 1933) – architect, artist and cartoonist
- Hazen Sise (transferred) – co-founder of Affleck, Desbarats, Dimakopoulos, Lebensold, Sise
- Janet Leys Shaw Mactavish (BArch 1947) – architect of the McIntyre Medical Sciences Building at McGill and Stirling Hall, the physics building at Queen's University
- John Campbell Merrett (BArch 1931) – staff architect for Canadian National Railway and town planner of Pointe-Claire, Quebec
- Karl Fischer (BSc[Arch] 1971, BArch 1972) – New York-based architect and benefactor of the Karl Fischer Scholarship at McGill
- Michael Fish (BSc[Arch] 1956) – Canadian architect and urban conservationist
- Lucien Lagrange (BArch 1972) – former partner at Skidmore, Owings & Merrill and founder of Lucien Lagrange & Associates
- Ludger Lemieux – architect known for his Art Deco buildings in Montreal, notably Atwater Market
- Maxwell M. Kalman (BArch 1931) – designed over 1,100 projects in Quebec, including Canada's first shopping centre
- Melvin Charney (BArch 1958) – architect known for designing the sculpture garden at the Canadian Centre for Architecture
- Moshe Safdie (MArch 1961) – architect of Habitat 67, Marina Bay Sands, Jewel Changi Airport and the Montreal Museum of Fine Arts
- Peter Oberlander (BArch 1945) – architect and Canada's first professor of Urban and Regional Planning
- Raymond Affleck (BArch 1947) – co-founder of Arcop
- Raymond Moriyama (MArch 1957) – architect of Ottawa City Hall, Bata Shoe Museum and Scarborough City Centre
- René Menkès (BArch 1955) – co-founder of WZMH Architects, architect of CN Tower
- Robert John Pratt (BArch 1933) – politician and architect
- Robert Jolicoeur, landscape architect and designer of FEI equestrian show jumping courses
- Robert Libman (BArch 1985) – politician and architect
- Robert Schofield Morris (BArch 1923) – architect and RIBA Gold Medal recipient
- Ted Remerowski (BSc[Arch] 1970) – film producer
- Witold Rybczynski (BArch 1966, MArch 1972, DSc 2002) – architectural writer/researcher

=== Current and former faculty ===
- Alberto Pérez-Gómez – professor (retired)
- Annmarie Adams – professor (current) and former director of the school
- Andre Vecsei – visiting professor
- Andrew Taylor – taught freehand and model drawing
- Arthur Lismer – member of the Group of Seven, taught from 1941 to 1955
- Cecil Burgess – began teaching in 1906
- Dan Hanganu – architect of the Pointe-à-Callière Museum and the HEC Montréal building
- Ernest Cormier – taught from 1919 to 1920
- Fred Lebensold – co-founder of Arcop, taught from 1949 to 1955
- Gavin Affleck – visiting professor
- Gentile Tondino – renowned artist, taught from 1959 to 1999
- Gilles Saucier – founder of Saucier + Perrotte, designed the Elizabeth Wirth Music Building on McGill campus, course lecturer (current)
- Guy Desbarats – co-founder of Affleck, Desbarats, Dimakopoulos, Lebensold, Sise
- Hazen Sise – co-founder of Affleck, Desbarats, Dimakopoulos, Lebensold, Sise
- John Bland – architect, served as director of the school for 31 years
- John C. Parkin – co-founder of John B. Parkin Associates, visiting professor
- Kiel Moe – Gerald Sheff Chair of Architecture (former)
- Michael Jemtrud – associate professor (current)
- Moshe Safdie – visiting professor
- Percy Nobbs – architect of many buildings on McGill's campus, including the Redpath Library and Osler Library buildings, taught from 1903 to 1939
- Peter Rose – architect of Canadian Centre for Architecture
- Ramsay Traquair – third director of the school, taught from 1913 to 1939
- Ray Affleck – co-founder of Arcop, visiting professor from 1967 to 1975
- Ricardo L. Castro – associate professor (current) since 1983
- Samuel Herbert Maw – architect, delineator and cartographer; professor of Architectural Rendering and Perspective in 1940
- Stewart Henbest Capper – first director of the school, taught from 1896 to 1903
- Warren Chalk – founding member of Archigram, visiting professor
- Andrew King Chief Design Officer at Montreal-based architecture firm Lemay and Professor in Practice at the Peter Guo-hua Fu School of Architecture

== See also ==
- List of architecture schools in Canada
- Macdonald-Harrington Building
- McCall MacBain Arts Building
- Stephen Leacock Building
- Elizabeth Wirth Music Building
- Architecture of Montreal
- Canadian Centre for Architecture
