= Arts Building (McGill University) =

McCall MacBain Arts Building
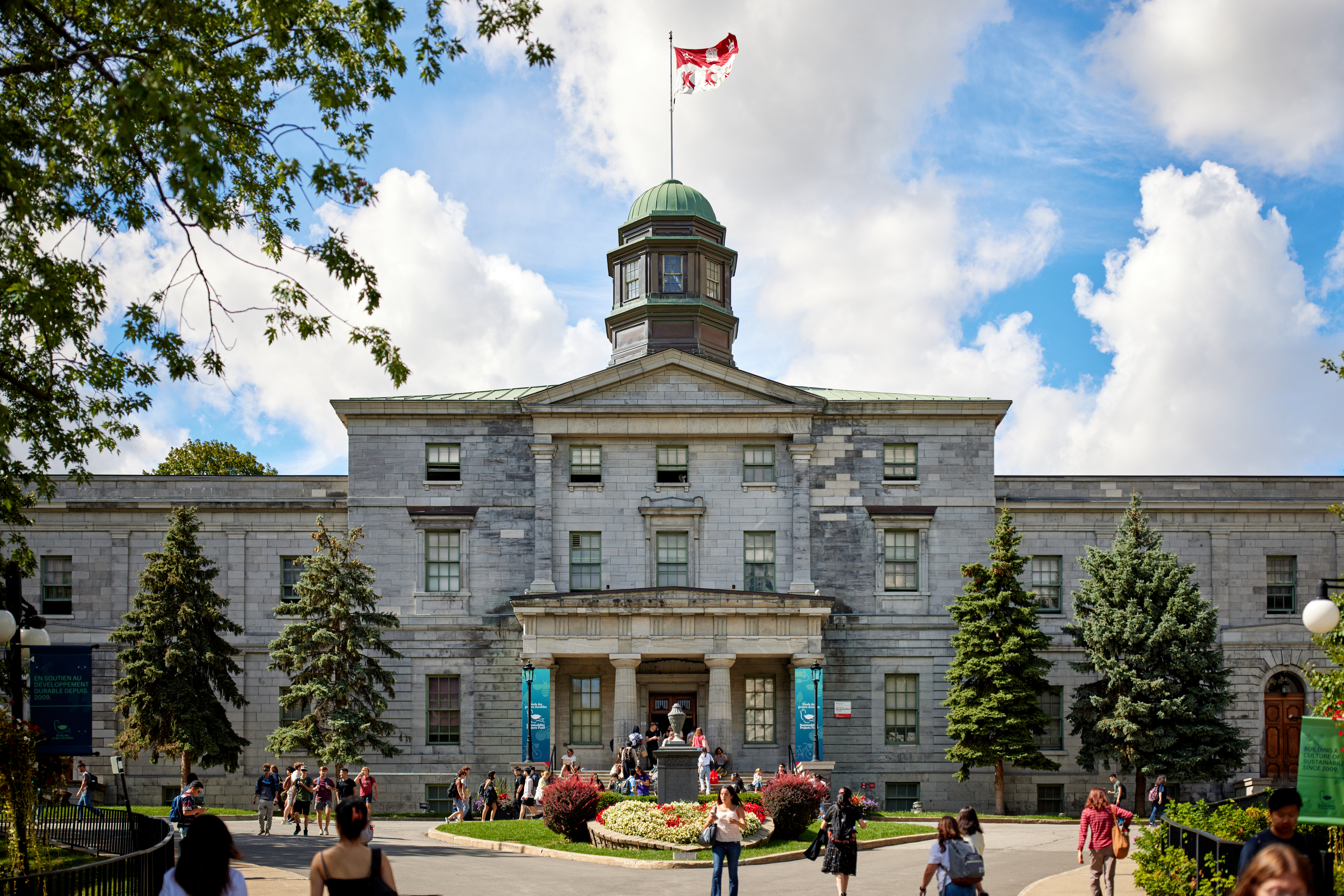
- Front of the building in 2022
- Interactive map of the McCall MacBain Arts Building area
- Former names: McGill College Building; Arts Building

General information
- Architectural style: Classical Revival
- Location: 853 Sherbrooke Street West, Montreal, Quebec, Canada
- Coordinates: 45.50500000°N 73.57750000°W
- Named for: John and Marcy McCall MacBain
- Completed: 1843 (central and east wings); 1861 (west wing); 1925 (north wing)
- Owner: McGill University

Design and construction
- Architect: John Ostell
- Other designers: William Spier; Alexander Francis Dunlop; H.L. Fetherstonhaugh; J.C. McDougall

The McCall MacBain Arts Building (also known as the Arts Building, formerly the McGill College Building) is a landmark building located at 853 Sherbrooke Street West in Montreal, Quebec, in the centre of McGill University's downtown campus. The Arts Building is the oldest existing building on campus, and it was designed in the Classical Revival style by John Ostell. Construction began in 1839, and the building's central block and east wing were completed in 1843. The west and north wings were finished in 1861 and 1925, respectively, after involving multiple architects, including Alexander Francis Dunlop and Harold Lea Fetherstonhaugh. Today, the Arts Building is made up of a central block and three distinct wings – Dawson Hall (east), Molson Hall (west) and Moyse Hall (north). The building currently houses the Department of French Language and Literature, the Department of English, and the Department of Art History and Communication Studies. It also hosts lectures for several other departments from the Faculty of Arts.

In April 2019, the building was renamed the McCall MacBain Arts Building in recognition of a private donation of C$200 million, the then-largest single gift to a university in Canadian history, from the McCall MacBain Foundation.

== History ==
In 1811, the founder of McGill University, James McGill, bequeathed his forty-six acre estate, Burnside Place (which stretched from what is now Doctor Penfield Avenue to a few streets south of Sherbrooke Street), along with £10,000, to the Royal Institution for the Advancement of Learning, which governed the education system in Quebec at that time. He made his bequest with the understanding that within ten years of his death, it would create a university, otherwise his heirs would acquire the property. This plan ultimately took a lot longer to achieve than expected, as the Royal Institution for the Advancement of Learning did not have trustees or a board and thus could not execute the provisions of the will.

Finally, in 1837, with McGill's bequest and property deed in hand, the Royal Institution decided to build the first building on campus. That year, the Royal Institution held a competition for the design of what would eventually be known as the McGill College Building (later called the Arts Building). In 1839, the competition was won by John Ostell, a British architect known for designing the Old Custom House (1836) in Montreal, and soon after, construction began on the McGill College Building.

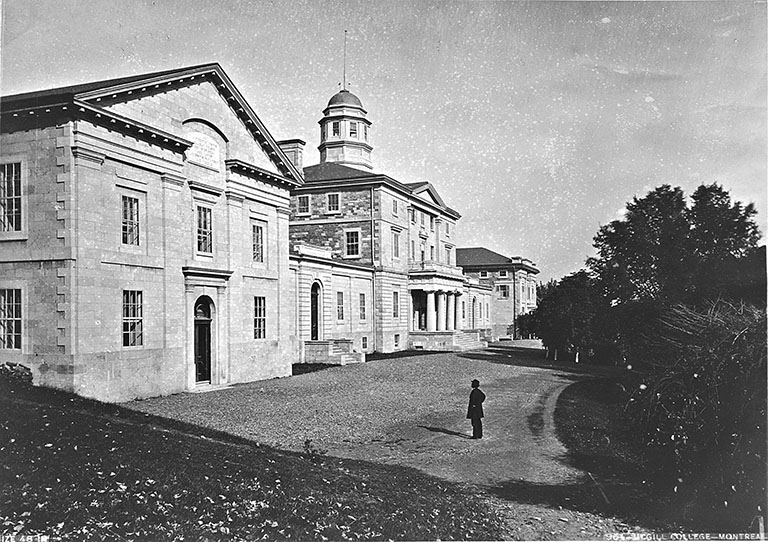
McGill College Building, c. 1875.

By 1843, the central and east sections of the building were constructed in the Classical Revival style, but a lack of funds prevented any further construction. At that time, the central block contained the kitchen, steward's residence, a room for the Governors' council, college hall, library and classrooms. The east section contained the chapel and vice-principal's residence. The Royal Institution had planned to build a two-storey portico with Doric columns but could not at that time. Due to the building not being properly finished, the roof leaked, the rooms were cold and dark, there were rats roaming the halls and several windows were broken. In order to raise money to finish the project, the Royal Institution sold land south of Sherbrooke Street.

In 1852, the city began construction of the McTavish reservoir and, in the process, inadvertently ended up sending large boulders into the roof of the McGill College Building. This resulted in the staff and students having to relocate.

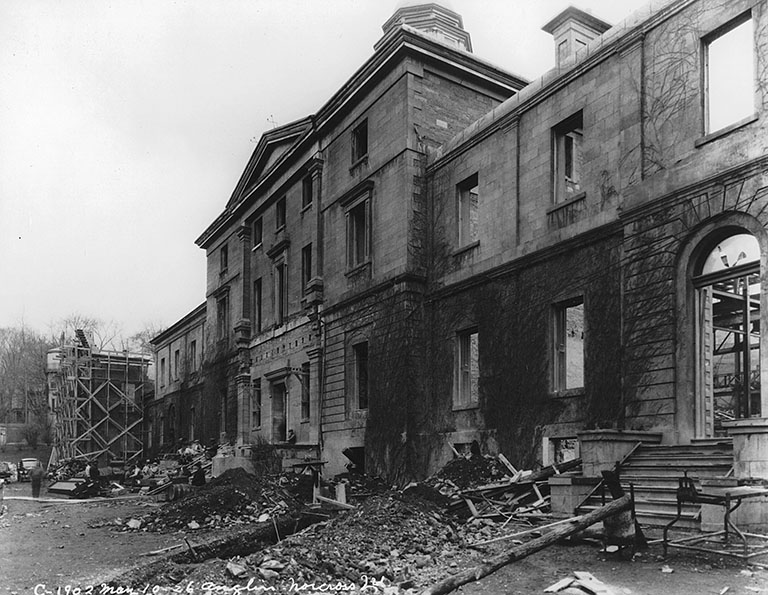
The Arts Building under renovation in 1926.

In 1855, the new principal of McGill College, Sir William Dawson, arrived to a disorderly campus. Dawson, who lived in the building's east wing, decided to fix up the campus. He hired J.W. Hopkins to add the portico with Doric columns that the Royal Institution had previously intended to build in front of the central block, although made out of wood rather than stone. Dawson convinced Sir William Molson to donate funds for the construction of the McGill College Building's west wing, which would be called Molson Hall. The west wing was built in 1861 by William Spier, and it held the convocation hall, classrooms, chemistry labs, a museum and a library.

In 1888, Alexander Francis Dunlop made major alterations to the building's east wing for the Science Department. At some point within the next few decades, as McGill continued to grow, the McGill College Building was renamed the Arts Building. In 1921, Ramsay Traquair, director of the McGill School of Architecture at that time, designed the McGill flag and presented it to the university. As of 2020, it continues to fly above the Arts Building.

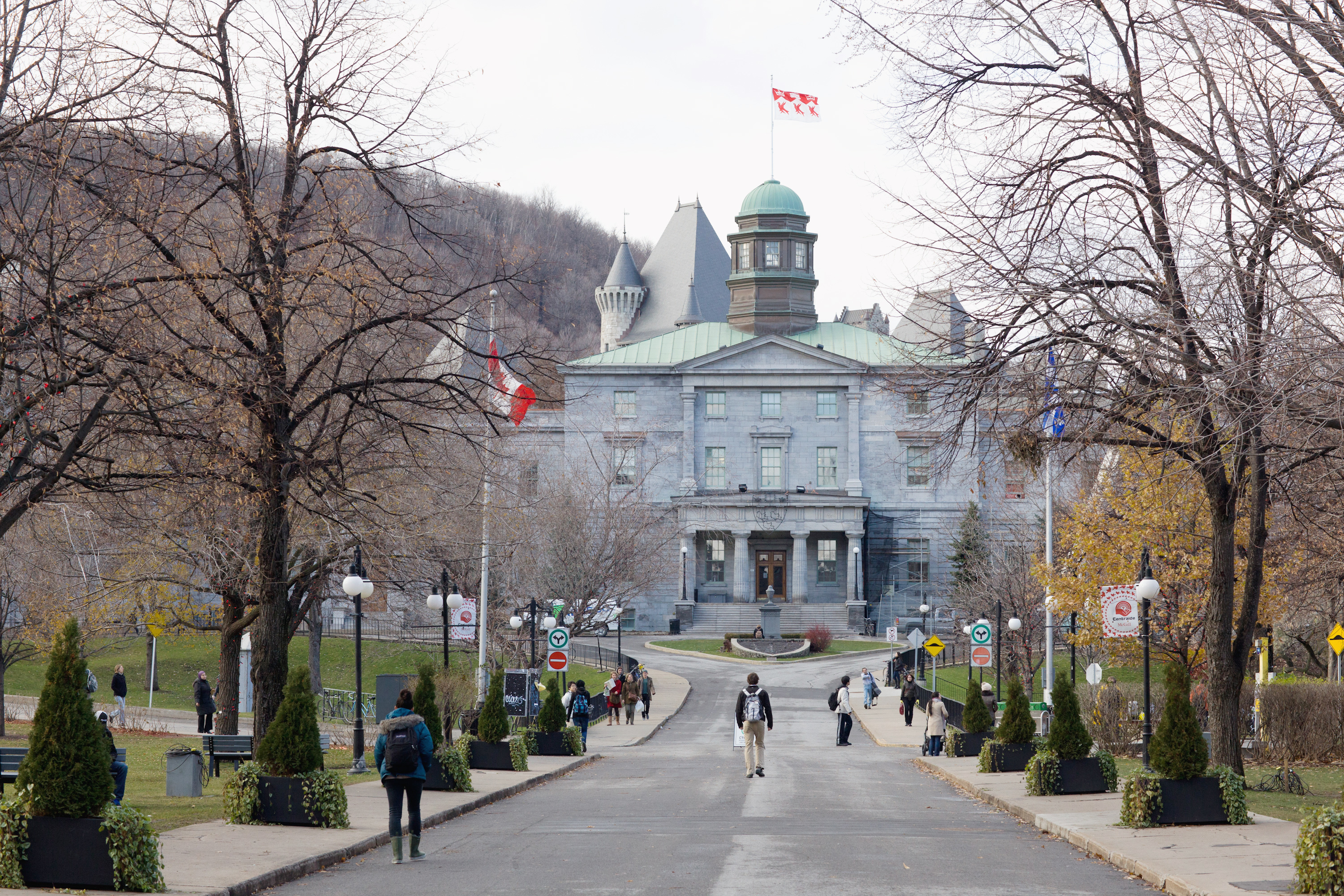
The Arts Building as seen from just beyond the Roddick Gates.

In 1925, Harold Lea Fetherstonhaugh and J. Cecil McDougall were hired to renovate the Arts Building. They transformed the central block's first floor into a large lobby with columns made of black marble, and a floor made of pink Tennessee marble. The construction was done by Anglin-Norcross Ltd. of Montreal. They also introduced the coloured globe lamp that hangs today in the entrance lobby surrounded by the zodiac signs. Behind the central block, Moyse Hall was added, containing a large lecture theatre with bas-reliefs and ten electric chandeliers made of bronze. The wooden portico that Hopkins added was taken down and rebuilt out of yellow stone, while an additional storey was added to Molson Hall. The exterior of the Arts Building has remained more or less the same since then.

The Arts Building's east wing, once simply known as "the wing", was named Dawson Hall in 1947, after its occupant Sir John William Dawson. Today, it serves as one of the university's administration facilities.

In 2019, the building was renamed the McCall MacBain Arts Building after the university received a private donation of C$200 million, the then-largest single gift to a university in Canada, from John and Marcy McCall MacBain through their McCall MacBain Foundation.

== Architecture ==
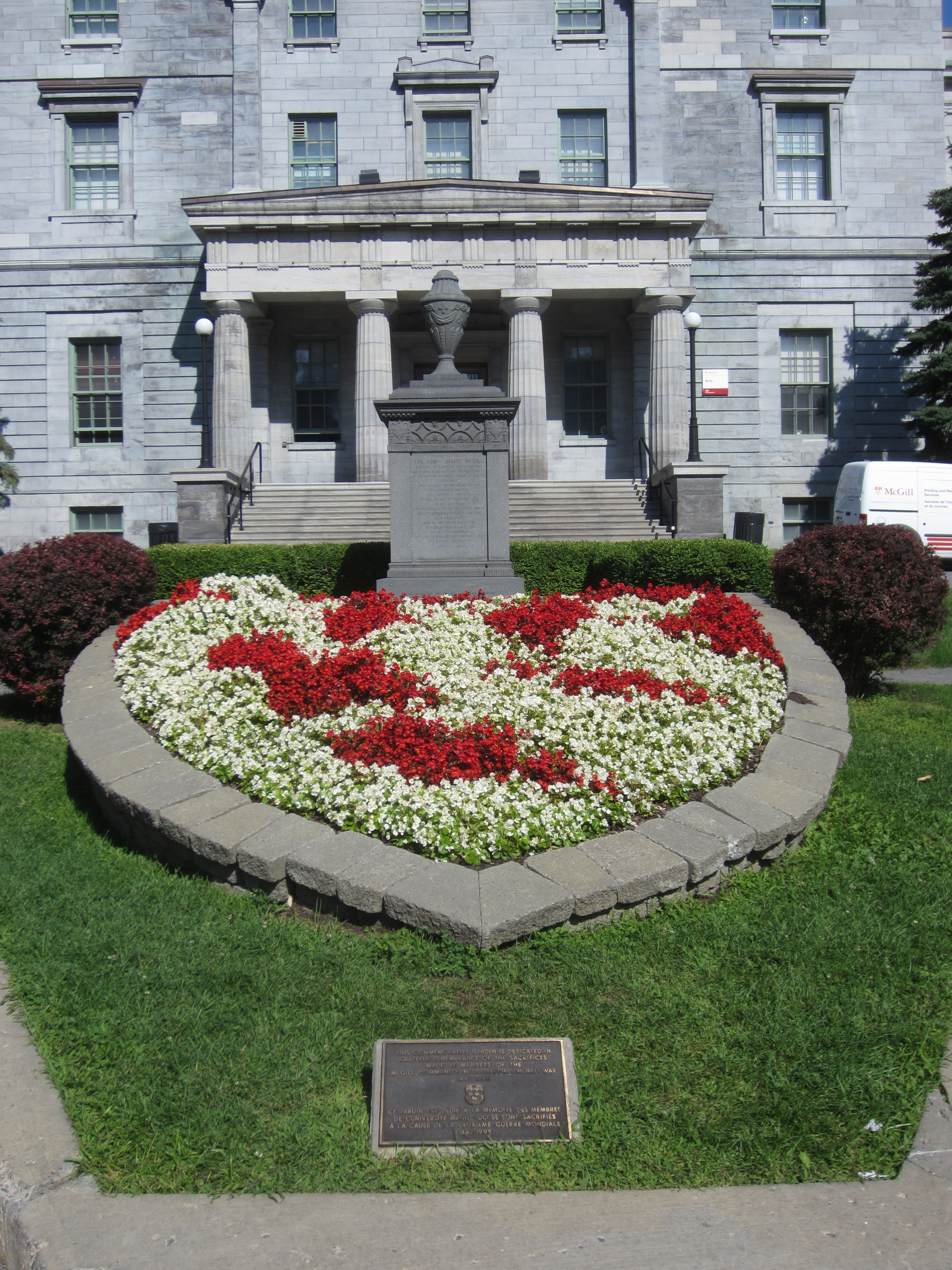
The tomb of James McGill in front of the Arts Building.

The McCall MacBain Arts Building uses a mix of Classical architectural elements, such as a front portico with a pediment held up by Tuscan columns. The motto of the university, Grandescunt Aucta Labore (Latin for 'By work, all things increase and grow'), is inscribed in the building, representing the classical and liberal education of the university around the time it was founded.

The interior lobby of the building contains black marble columns, a pink marble floor and oak furnishings. The wooden cupola atop the central block, from which the McGill flag flies, can be seen from the Roddick Gates and is a recognizable symbol of the university. The tomb of James McGill can also be seen in front of the Arts Building.

== Restoration ==
In 2016, the Arts Building underwent significant restorations by the Montreal architectural firm EVOQ Architecture, in order to preserve its heritage. The building had significantly deteriorated and the restoration project involved the selective dismantling and consolidation of two sections of the wall, unit re-anchoring, the replacement of multiple stones and the restoration of 44 windows. The front portico was also stabilized and the stone masonry completely restored in order to recreate the original appearance while also ensuring the structural stability of the building.

== See also ==
- McGill University buildings and structures
- Leacock Building
- Macdonald-Harrington Building
- McGill School of Architecture
