= Stephen Leacock Building =

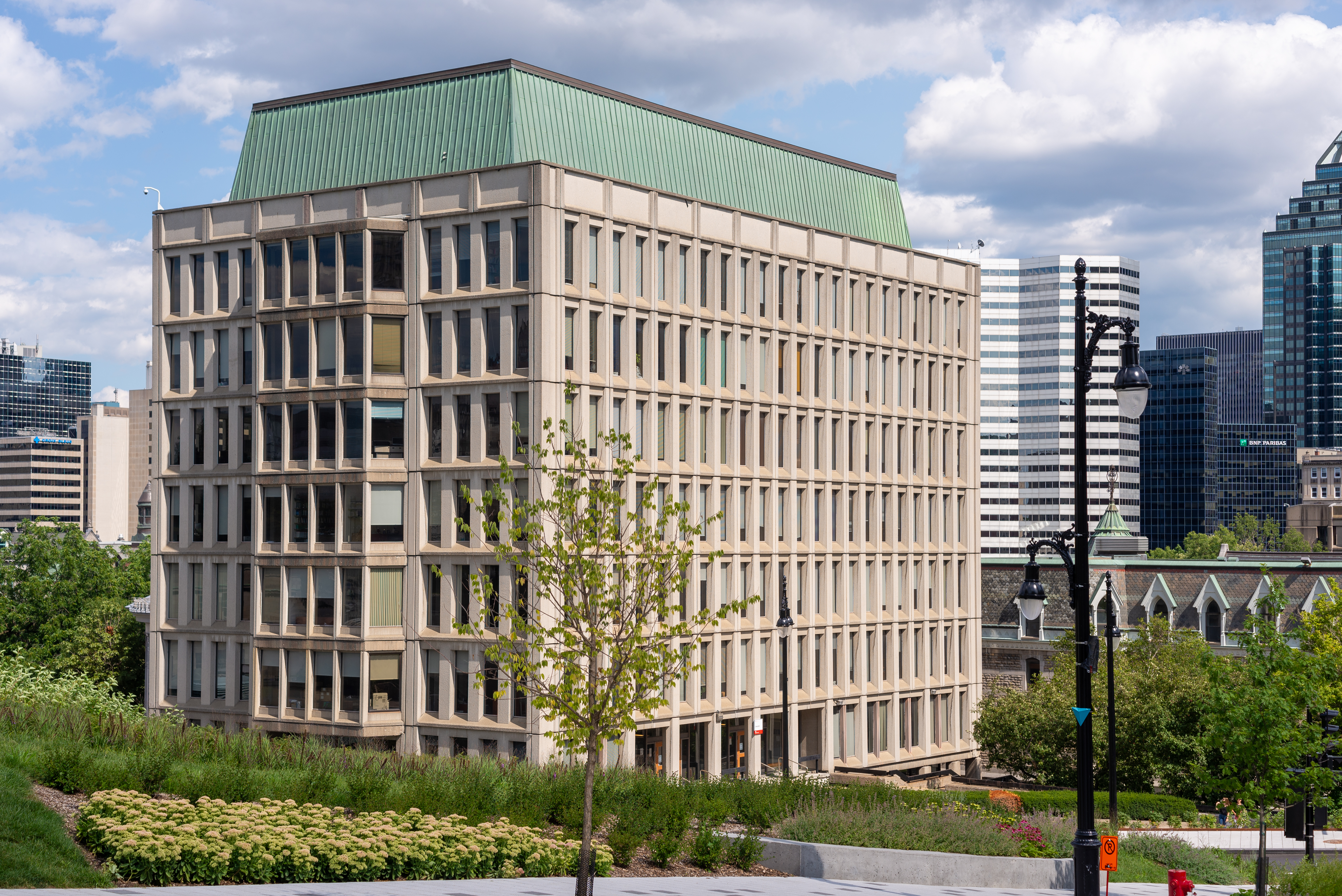
- Leacock Building (2017)
- Interactive map of the Stephen Leacock Building area
- Alternative names: Leacock Building; Leacock
- Etymology: Stephen Leacock

General information
- Architectural style: Brutalism
- Location: 855 Sherbrooke Street West, Montreal, Quebec, Canada
- Coordinates: 45.50444444°N 73.57777778°W
- Construction started: 1962
- Completed: 1965
- Affiliation: McGill University

Height
- Height: 30m

Technical details
- Material: concrete
- Floor count: 11
- Lifts/elevators: 3

Design and construction
- Architect: Ray Affleck
- Architecture firm: Arcop

The Stephen Leacock Building, also known simply as the Leacock Building, is a building located at 855 Sherbrooke Street West, on the McGill University downtown campus in Montreal, Quebec. The building was named after Stephen Leacock, a well-known Canadian humorist and author, and Professor of Economics at McGill from 1901 to 1944. Built between 1962 and 1965 by the Montreal architectural firm Arcop, the Leacock Building's purpose was to accommodate the growing number of students at McGill, particularly in the Faculty of Arts which had outgrown its ancestral home, the Arts Building.

Leacock is a ten-storey, Brutalist concrete structure currently housing the Departments of Humanities, Social Sciences and Islamic Studies at McGill. It contains offices on the upper floors and lecture rooms on the lower floors, including the largest lecture room at McGill, Leacock-132, which seats up to 650 students at a time. The tower can be accessed from three different levels, either from the first floor at street level, the second floor terrace to the south, or the third floor terrace to the west from McTavish Street. It can also be entered directly from the Arts Building from the east through a two-storey glass-walled corridor.

== History ==
At the time of the Leacock Building's construction, many building projects at McGill were being constructed due to the large increase in enrollment at the university. Many faculties and departments had expanded beyond their spaces and needed more room to grow, such as the Faculty of Arts, the largest faculty at McGill today, which at one point fit entirely into the Arts Building.

Among the number of projects being constructed on campus was the Stephen Leacock Building, which was chosen to be designed by Arcop, a Montreal-based architectural firm founded entirely by graduates of and/or professors at the McGill School of Architecture, including Ray Affleck, Guy Desbarats, Hazen Sise, Fred Lebensold and Dimitri Dimakopoulos. The firm had previously constructed the University Centre on campus, and is known for having designed many important buildings in Montreal, such as Place Bonaventure (1964-1967) and Place Ville-Marie (1958-1964).

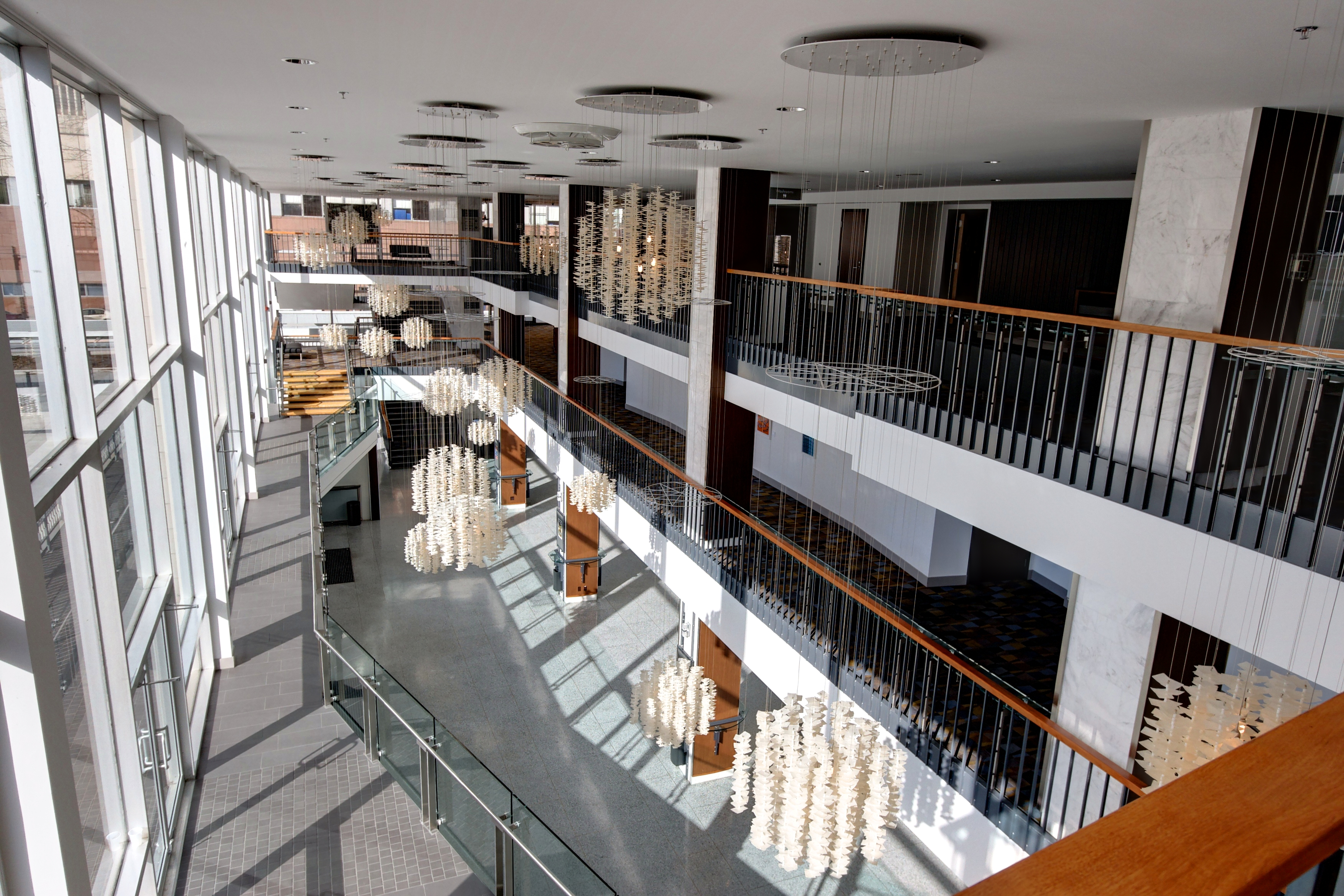
Interior of the Queen Elizabeth Theatre, designed by Arcop in 1959, looks strikingly similar to the interior of the Leacock Building.

The area chosen for the new building was the site of the McGill Observatory and half of the Presbyterian College, which today is Morrice Hall, which houses the McGill University Institute of Islamic Studies and Islamic Studies Library. Originally, the Leacock Building was intended to have two towers, but the second tower was never built, for it was deemed unnecessary and would have required the demolition of the Gothic Morrice Hall.

== Layout ==
The Leacock Building is ten storeys tall, and currently houses parts of the Departments of Humanities, Social Sciences and Islamic Studies at McGill. The first three floors contain twenty-four lecture rooms ranging from 30 seats to 200 in capacity. The first floor also contains the largest lecture hall at McGill, called Leacock-132, which can seat up to 650 students at once. The large auditorium has no windows in order to provide fewer distractions, and is half underground with its seats sloping in the same direction as the natural hillside. The lecture halls were specifically designed to be on the lower floors so that they would be easily accessible to students, and would also lower the amount of traffic to the upper floors, which contain 125 offices served by elevators. While the lower floors are quite open in plan, the upper floors follow a traditional race-track layout.

Due to Leacock's unique position of being banked into the hillside, it can be accessed from three different levels, either from the first floor at street level facing Redpath Museum, the second floor terrace to the south, facing Morrice Hall, or the third floor terrace to the west from McTavish Street. It can also be entered directly from the Arts Building from the east through a two-storey glass-walled corridor.

== Architecture ==
Leacock is a Brutalist structure comprising precast load-bearing concrete panels on the exterior, each containing a sealed window. Three different moldings are used for the panels, with the one containing the largest opening used for the central bay windows on the north and south facades, the next largest on either side of those bay openings, and the smallest on the east and west facades. Concrete pillars with hexagonal horizontal sections support the structure above the first two storeys, which unlike the upper floors contain walls made almost entirely of glass. These walls allow a great deal of natural light into the lower floors where students gather to attend lectures. One of the core ideas of Brutalism was to produce a rich individual user experience while creating a sense of equality and spatial democracy. The use of precast concrete panels containing sealed windows was the manifestation of these ideas, as their repetitiveness and identicality erase any kind of spatial hierarchy. In contrast, the interior walls are made up of different concrete textures in order to have a unique experience for each individual.

The use of 120-degree angles can be seen throughout the design of the Leacock Building, such as in the guardrails of the staircases, the bay windows protruding from the tower and the layout of the extension and Leacock-132, which can be understood when viewing Leacock from above. A green roof covers the building's mechanical equipment in order to visually link Leacock to the neighboring Redpath Museum and Arts Building, with the green patina coloring of their roofs.

== See also ==
- McGill University buildings and structures
- McCall MacBain Arts Building
- Macdonald-Harrington Building
- Elizabeth Wirth Music Building
- McGill School of Architecture
