= Catherine Mary Wisnicki =

Canadian architect (1919 - 2014)

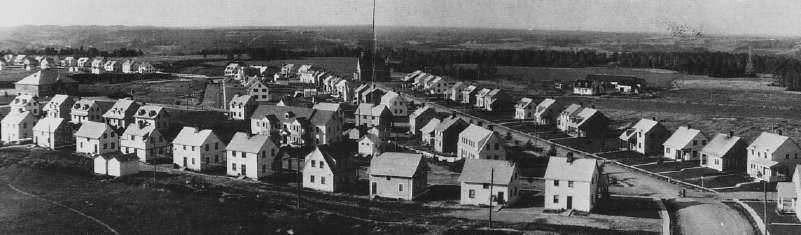
- Arvida, Quebec, 1928
- Born: Catherine Chard; September 19, 1919; Winnipeg, Manitoba
- Died: October 21, 2014 (aged 95); British Columbia
- Education: McGill University
- Known for: architecture, urban planning
- Movement: Modernist architecture
- Spouse: Paul Wisnicki
- Awards: Honorary Doctorate of Science, McGill University, 1996

Catherine Mary Wisnicki (née Chard, 19 September 1919 – 21 October 2014) was a Canadian architect, planner and educator. She was the first woman to graduate from the McGill University School of Architecture. Her professional career was spent largely in Vancouver, where she was a senior designer with the firm Sharp, Thompson, Berwick & Pratt (later Thompson Berwick and Pratt and Partners). She taught at the University of British Columbia school of architecture.

== Biography ==
Catherine Mary Wisnicki was born in Winnipeg, Manitoba in 1919. She graduated from McGill University with a Bachelor of Arts in History in 1939. In 1943, she obtained her Bachelor of Architecture, becoming the first woman to graduate from the school of architecture at McGill.

Early in her career, Wisnicki worked with A.J.C. Paine and Lawson & Betts. She also participated in the planning of Arvida, Québec, for the Aluminum Company of Canada (which became Alcan). Right after World War II, she undertook a study of prefabricated housing for the Canadian Wooden Aircraft Company in Toronto. As an outcome of the research, she co-authored a major article on the subject of "prefab" houses with city planner E.G. Faludi in 1945.

In 1945, Wisnicki registered with the Ontario Association of Architects, becoming their fourth woman member. That same year, she married Paul Wisnicki, a former aeronautical structural engineer in the Polish Air Force. In 1946, they moved to Vancouver, where she became the second female member to register with the Architectural Institute of British Columbia.

Wisnicki spent most of her career in Vancouver, where she became a senior designer with firm Sharp, Thompson, Berwick & Pratt (later Thompson Berwick and Pratt and Partners. She worked closely with partner Ned Pratt, participating in the design of the Brooks, Saba, Gregg and Mathers residences, all considered icons of Canadian West Coast Modernism. She also worked briefly in partnership with architect John C. H. Porter to design the Daniels and Nemetz houses on the University of British Columbia Endowment Lands, which are also considered iconic.

In 1963, Wisnicki began teaching part-time at the University of British Columbia's school of architecture. She joined the faculty full-time in 1969.

After retiring in 1986, Wisnicki and her husband moved to Naramata, British Columbia where they designed and built an innovative passive solar house.

In 1996, McGill University gave Wisnicki an honorary doctorate in science.

== Influence ==
Wisnicki was a trailblazing woman in a field dominated by men. She was the first woman to graduate from McGill University's school of architecture, the fourth female member of the Ontario Association of Architects, and the second female member of the Architectural Institute of British Columbia. Along with Porter and others, Wisnicki was among a group that brought Modernist ideas to the West Coast in the postwar period. She contributed to the regional style known as West Coast Modernism or BC Modernism, characterized by a clear expression of structure (often with large wood or concrete members), and generous connections between indoor and outdoor spaces.

== See also ==
- Thompson Berwick and Pratt and Partners
