= Ricardo L. Castro =

- Born: Ricardo León Castro; April 2, 1942 (age 84); Bogotá, Colombia
- Known for: Architecture
- Notable work: Rogelio Salmona: A Tribute (2008), Arthur Erickson: Critical Works (2006), Syndetic Modernisms (2014)
- Awards: Prix Paul-Henri Lapointe, Ordre des Architectes du Québec (1990), Ida & Samuel Fromson Award for Outstanding Teaching, McGill University (2005)
- Elected: Royal Canadian Academy of Arts (2015), Royal Architectural Institute of Canada (2010)

Ricardo León Castro, RCA FRAIC (born 1942) is a Colombian-born, Canadian architectural photographer, critic, and educator. Known for his monographs on architects Rogelio Salmona and Arthur Erickson, his design philosophy was published in Syndetic Modernisms (2014). Castro was elected Fellow of the Royal Architectural Institute of Canada (FRAIC) in 2010, and to the Royal Canadian Academy of Arts in 2015. He was awarded the 1990 Prix Paul-Henri Lapointe for architectural journalism by the Ordre des Architectes du Québec. A frequent contributor to Canadian Architect Magazine and ARQ Architecture Québec, photographic expositions of his work were also held in public institutions in Bogotá, Vancouver, Toronto, Ottawa, Montreal and Quebec City.

== Education and career ==
Ricardo León Castro was born in Bogotá, Colombia, on April 2, 1942. As a youth he lived in Madrid, Spain, and, at age 14, began to photograph his surroundings. Inspired by his uncle, architect Dicken Castro, he enrolled in architecture at the Universidad de Los Andes where he was taught by Rogelio Salmona. At this time he also photographed the colonial Colombian city of Villa de Leyva and was mentored by Germán Téllez at the Universidad de Los Andes and William Zapata at the Colombo American Center. In 1972 Castro graduated with a Bachelor of Architecture from Universidad de Los Andes and moved to Eugene, Oregon to attend the School of Architecture and Allied Arts at the University of Oregon. There he was taught by Robert S. Harris, a proponent of participatory design, and worked during the summers of 1973-75 in the Campus Planning Office where Christopher Alexander's Pattern Language was implemented as The Oregon Experiment. Castro graduated with a Master of Architecture in 1974, but continued to study Architectural History and attend seminars given by photographers Bernard Freemesser and Brett Weston. In 1976 he graduated from the University of Oregon with a Master of Arts in Art History and moved to Quebec City. Castro taught from 1977 to 1982 at the Université Laval which awarded him a doctoral equivalency in 1978. He continued to photograph architecture and an exhibition of his work "The Facades of Quebec: CloseUps", sponsored by the McCord Museum, was held in Montreal and at the Université Laval in 1980, Carleton University in 1981, and the University of Toronto in 1982. That year Castro moved to Montreal to teach at the McGill University School of Architecture and, in 1983, he was appointed Associate Professor of Architecture.

During the 1980s Castro's reviews and essays were published in Canadian Architect, ARQ Architecture Québec and, after 1985, in the Montreal Gazette. In 1998 his research on architect Rogelio Salmona was published in both Spanish and English, and he exhibited photographs of Salmona's work at Galeria Mundo (Bogotá) in 2001. During the early 2000s, Castro was also Director of Research at the Institut de recherché en histoire de l’architecture (IRHA) in Montreal. At that time he partnered with Nicholas Olsberg of the Canadian Centre for Architecture to research the work of Canadian architect Arthur Erickson. Following the publication of Arthur Erickson: Critical Works, Castro curated the accompanying exhibition at the Vancouver Art Gallery, held from June to September 2006. That year he also lectured on "Architecture and Photography" at the Tate Liverpool. In 2007 Castro was also appointed Associate Director of the Masters of Architecture (M. Arch) Professional Program at McGill University, a position he held until 2011. He also joined the editorial board of deArq, the architectural journal of the Universidad de los Andes and his book on Salmona's later work, Rogelio Salmona: Tributo was published in Bogotá. In 2008 the English edition Rogelio Salmona: A Tribute was published, and Castro lectured on Salmona at Centro Cultural Gabriel Garcia Marquez in Bogotá. From 2008-14, he collaborated with Juan Suarez of the University of Western Ontario on Spanish Baroque Fortifications in the Caribbean. In 2013 Castro's photographs were exhibited as "Paseo de ronda: Chemin de ronde / Wall-walk" and those of Punta Pite, Chile, were published in 2014 in Syndetic Modernisms. Castro continued to teach at McGill School of Architecture and, in 2015, he was Resident Fellow of the McGill Institute for Public Arts and Ideas (IPLAI) as well as a member of the editorial board for the architectural journal deArq. At that time he was also recognized for photographic excellence by the Royal Canadian Academy of Arts and inducted as a member in May 2016.

== Design philosophy and analysis ==
An architectural historian and design instructor, Castro wrote that his goal was to convey "both the theoretical and pragmatic aspects in a holistic way". Influenced by the work of architects Juhani Pallasmaa and Peter Zumthor and colleagues Alberto Perez-Gomez and Robert Mellin, Castro used the Greek term sýndesis to convey both the "tangible and conceptual" in monographs on Canadian architect Arthur Erickson and Colombian architect Rogelio Salmona. A concern with "urban topography", or architecture within its environment, is central to his analysis of the Hispanic Baroque. Castro interests also include the 17th- and 18th-century European notion of limits as well as systemic thinking and mnemonics within design. Interested in literature and philosophy, Castro's analysis of architecture or art also incorporated literary concepts. Introduced to the writings of Alejo Carpentier by his uncle Dicken Castro, he elaborated on the idea of lo real maravilloso (the real-marvelous) in the 1992 essay "Thoughts at the Edge of Architecture: Solitude and the Marvelous-Real" in ARQ Architecture Québec. More recently Castro included W. G. Sebald's "concept of the extraordinary" in A Taxonomy of Collecting, an analysis of collages by John A. Schweitzer exhibited at the University of Western Ontario in 2014. In Syndetic Modernisms, Carlos Rueda Plata wrote that both "syndesis and thaumaturgy (the marvelous)" informed Castro's analysis of the ceremonial path of Punta Pite, Chile.

== Recognition ==
Castro is recognized as a photographer as well as an architectural critic and historian. He was elected to the Royal Canadian Academy of Arts in 2015, and to the College of Fellows of the Royal Architectural Institute of Canada (FRAIC) in 2010. In 2002 he was Moderator in the “Design/Intervention/Montreal” at the Professional Practice Conference of the American Institute of Architects. In March 2005 he was Chair of Open Sessions at the annual conference of the Association of Collegiate Schools of Architecture in Chicago. Recognized for excellence in architectural journalism, he was awarded the 1990 Prix Paul-Henri Lapointe in the category "History, Criticism and Theory" by the Ordre des architectes du Québec. Castro was awarded grants by the Canada Council and the Graham Foundation for Advanced Studies in the Fine Arts to research Rogelio Salmona. He was also awarded grants from the Graham Foundation and the Institut de recherche en histoire de l’architectura (IRHA) for his collaborative research on Arthur Erickson. Published as Arthur Erickson: Critical Works in 2006, the book was described in the American Library Association's publication Choice as: "diverse but engaging essays, excellent layout, and superb photography reflect the extraordinary synthesis of building traditions, symbolic and structural, in Erickson's work. The book was also awarded the 2007 Alcuin Society Award for Excellence in Book Design Castro's research on Baroque Fortifications in the Caribbean in association with the University of Western Ontario was funded through the Major Collaborative Research Initiatives (2008-2014) of the Social Sciences and Humanities Research Council of Canada. Throughout his career, Castro taught at the Universidad de Los Andes (Bogota), University of Oregon, Kansas State University, and Université Laval, and was recognized, as an educator, with the 2005 Ida & Samuel Fromson Award for Outstanding Teaching by the McGill University Faculty of Engineering (School of Architecture).

== Books ==
- Syndesis II co-authored with Robert Mellin and Carlos Rueda Plata. (Bogota: Universidad Piloto de Colombia, 2016) Bilingual English/Spanish edition.
- Syndetic Modernisms co-authored with Robert Mellin and Carlos Rueda Plata. (Bogota: Universidad Piloto de Colombia, 2014) Bilingual English/Spanish edition.
- Rogelio Salmona: A Tribute (Bogota: Villegas Editores, 2008) English edition. ISBN 9588306140. First published as Rogelio Salmona: Tributo (Bogotá: Villegas Editores, 2008). Spanish edition.
- Arthur Erickson: Critical Works co-authored with Nicholas Olsberg. (Vancouver, BC: Douglas & McIntyre) 2006 Canadian edition ISBN 978-1553651543 and (Seattle, WA: University of Washington Press, 2007) American edition ISBN 978-0295986203.
- The Shapes of Time: John Schweitzer (Montreal: Westmount Visual Art Centre, 2001) Bilingual English/French edition.
- Rogelio Salmona (Bogota: Villegas Editores, 1998) English edition and Spanish edition.
