= Robert Jolicoeur =

Canadian landscape architect (born 1948)

Robert Jolicoeur (born June 15, 1948) is a Canadian landscape architect and designer of FEI international equestrian show jumping courses. He is noted for designing the show jumping courses for a number of major equestrian competitions. He was the jumping course designer for the 1976 Olympic games in Montreal, and designed the entire equestrian venue for the 1996 Atlanta Olympics, as well as parts of the Kentucky Horse Park. He is an official international course designer for the FEI, and has also served as a technical delegate for several World Cup Events. He is viewed as having played a key role in the development of Equestrian sport in North America.

Jolicoeur grew up on a farm with horses but realized that, unlike his brother Pierre, he was not an Olympic rider. After his experience designing show jumping courses for the Montreal Olympics as well as many other competitions, Jolicoeur went to college in 1978 to study landscape architecture with the goal of continuing to work in the horse show world. He is a graduate of the McGill School of Architecture in Montreal. In 1981, he started the company International Equestrian Design (IED), which specializes in the design and planning of "avant garde" equestrian sites and theme parks.

Jolicoeur's goal is to design farms and other facilities to be safe, functional, safe for driving, and attractive. In facility design, he has stated that his goals include grener designs that minimize environmental impact, making better use of fertilizers and taking water quality and evaporation loss into consideration. He also has a particular interest in protecting the health of sport horses and improving their performance through the development of new types of footing materials. His company has a research program to study and evaluate different types of materials for both horse footing and building design.

His brother, the show jumping trainer, Pierre Jolicouer, is also a course designer. From 1971 to 1981, the two brothers owned Robespierre Stables, and Pierre, as a trainer, was affiliated with Canadian Olympic medalist Michel Vaillancourt.

Robert has been part of evaluation committees for Toronto 2008, NYC 2012 and Chicago 2016, in their bids to bring the Olympics to their respective cities. In 2004, an Independent Review Body, consisting of Edouard de Rothschild, Chairman (FRA), Jack Snyder (USA), Robert Jolicoeur (CAN) and Thomas Velin was established by the FEI following the Olympic Games to determine why a number of horses received tendon injuries during the Jumping Competitions in Athens and to make recommendations for the future.

In a 2007 interview, Jolicoeur stated, "[I have a] passion to take a piece of property and to make it look nice. It makes for a nice legacy, to have land preserved and to have horses on it and to have people see this as they drive down the road and see pretty land and pretty horses...I like what I'm doing. I don't intend to stop."
