= Gavin Affleck =

Canadian architect (born 1958)

- Born: October 11, 1958 (age 67); Montreal, Quebec
- Education: McGill University
- Occupation: Architect
- Awards: 2015 National Trust Award; 2013 Award of Excellence, Order of architects of Quebec; 2009 Award of Excellence, Canadian Society of Landscape Architects
- Practice: Affleck de la Riva
- Projects: Montreal City Hall (2013), Square des Frères-Charon (2009), Minton House (2004)
- Website: Affleck de la Riva

Gavin Affleck (born October 11, 1958), FRAIC, is a Canadian architect known for the design of cultural institutions and public spaces. He is the founding partner of the Montreal firm Affleck de la Riva alongside Richard de la Riva, and is the son of architect and Arcop founder Ray Affleck. Affleck is an elected Fellow of the Royal Architectural Institute of Canada (FRAIC), a member of the Quebec Order of Architects (OAQ) and the Ontario Association of Architects (OAA), as well as a LEED-certified architect.

== Education and career ==
Gavin Affleck was born in Montreal on October 11, 1958. His father, Ray, was an esteemed architect and founder of the Montreal-based architectural firm Arcop, which was famous for designing many iconic buildings in Montreal, including Place Bonaventure and Place Ville-Marie. Growing up in an architect's household, especially at a time when his father's firm was so involved with shaping the cityscape of Montreal, Affleck got an inside look at the practice from a younger age than most. For his sixth birthday, Affleck "was given the working model for Place Bonaventure" which subsequently got demolished in the basement of a house with four boys in it, including animator Neil Affleck. Affleck has said that this showed him "how a building was put together by taking it apart."

In 1980, Affleck began studies at McGill University's School of Architecture and graduated with a Bachelor of Science in Architecture in 1984 and Bachelor of Architecture in 1985. After interning at Jodoin, Lamarre, Pratte et associés architectes (1986–88) and at Arcop (1988–89), Affleck set up his own practice. In 1990 his housing plan was awarded First Prize in a pan-Canadian design competition, while in 1992 a home design, entered in La casa più bella del mondo (Milan), received a jury special mention. In 1995 Affleck partnered with Governor General's Award recipient, Richard de la Riva, to form Affleck de la Riva. Their design for La Maison des trois jardins earned the 1998 Canadian Architect Award of Excellence, while Minton Hill House received a 2005 Home of the Year Award from Architecture Magazine.

During the early 2000s Affleck designed the City of Montreal's nursery, Pépinière municipale de la Ville de Montréal (2001), Hampstead Park Pavilion (2002) and the Côte Saint-Luc Recreation and Community Centre (2003). Other early Affleck de la Riva projects included the multiple dwellings Plex de la rue Saint-Ambroise (2003) and Les condominiums Clark-Bernard (2004), as well as the residential-commercial building, Habitations Wilson Monkland (2013). The firm's design for Les Habitations Joseph-Le-Caron (2009) in Montreal North earned an Outside the Box Award for Innovative Social Housing from Building Magazine. In 2009 Affleck was accredited in "Leadership in Energy and Environmental Design" (LEED) and began to focus on inner-city revitalization and urban design projects. He developed plans for Puerto Plata, Dominican Republic (2009) and for Square des Frères-Charon (2009) which received the 2009 Canadian Society of Landscape Architects' Award of Excellence. Affleck was also project manager for the LaSalle Waterworks Building (2012) which included geothermal heating and photovoltaic solar collectors. In 2013 his green plan for Montreal's Quartier 21 Peter-McGill, received the Conseil régional de l'environnement de Montréal's sustainable development award, while his redesign of Victoria School, École des métiers de la restauration et du tourisme de Montréal, was the first LEED-certified school in the Commission scolaire de Montréal. Awarded the 2015 National Trust Award, Affleck spoke on its refurbishment at the OAQ's environmental design lectures, Mardis verts. His interest in the craft-based trades also led to public commissions for the restoration of Bonsecours Market (2012) and Montreal City Hall (2010-17), both National Historic Sites of Canada. In 2016 at the time of his election to the cultural advisory board, the Conseil du patrimoine culturel du Québec, Affleck's projects included the new Rigaud City Hall, as well as the refurbishment of Brossard City Hall and Cabot Square, Montreal.

== Design philosophy ==
Throughout his career, Affleck has explored "the potential of landscape and history to generate contemporary architecture". His integration of landscape within the Katz House (1990) was described by Elizabeth Wood as: "Affleck's esteem for the openness of the Canadian landscape, his love of natural material, and his respect for the delicate and subtle relationship between an architectural structure and its surrounding environment." A respect for client requirements, which Affleck described as a "much stronger architectural idea" than signature, was evident in the Minton Hill House (2004). He has also advocated for community consultation within the design process. For Square des Frères-Charon, citizen comments on a community website formed the basis of the project design. With a belief that well-designed urban space "is simple, flexible and free of physical encumbrances" which enhances "human activity", his redesign of Cabot Square has been described in Canadian Architect as "an inclusive place that multiple communities may call home." Also concerned with the integration of contemporary design within historical settings, Affleck wrote in 2004 that Montreal housing "projects show a greater understanding of the following aspects of their architecture: urban design, respect for traditional housing types, insertion into historic contexts, environmental performance and interpretation...." He has also recognized that restoration must take into account traditional craftsmanship, a practice noted in the Brossard City Hall renovation: "Affleck de la Riva's project respectfully restores the building's monumental masonry elevations, conserves existing vegetation, and completes the enclosure of the city hall's new civic plaza." At that time it was also noted that: "The work of the firm grows out of a belief that quality environmental design is an agent of social change and a key element in fostering citizenship, social equity, and healthy lifestyles."

== Recognition ==
In 2014 Affleck was elected Fellow of the Royal Architectural Institute of Canada (FRAIC) for his contribution to design excellence and distinguished service to the profession and community. Throughout his career he has participated in numerous professional activities including the Technical Review Committee of the Green Municipal Fund, Federation of Canadian Municipalities (Ottawa ON), the Canadian Centre for Architecture/Université de Montréal symposium "Dealing with the 60s: How to intervene in the architecture of the 60s," and the Quebec Order of Architects' lecture series on environmental design, les Mardis verts. Affleck has also taught at schools of architecture including McGill University (Montreal QC), Dalhousie University (Halifax NS) as well as the Université de Montréal. As an architectural critic he has written for Vie des Arts and the Montreal Gazette and was a contributing editor to Canadian Architect from 2004 to 2014. Affleck was elected in 2016 to the Minister of Culture and Communication's advisory board on the promotion and protection of Quebec culture, the Conseil du patrimoine culturel du Québec.

Affleck's residential projects including the Katz House (1990) and Minton Hill House (2004) drew favorable reviews locally as well as in international professional journals. Affleck de la Riva's institutional projects have also been well received and, as designer and project manager, Affleck has been interviewed for the projects Square des Frères-Charon, Cabot Square, and Brossard City Hall in the Royal Architectural Institute of Canada's journal Canadian Architect. The firm has received Awards of Excellence from the Quebec Order of Architects (OAQ), Canadian Society of Landscape Architects, and Canadian Architect magazine, as well as a Home of the Year Award by Architecture Magazine, the National Trust Award, Prix de l'Institut de Design de Montréal, and Grand prix de l'opération patrimoine de Montréal.

== Design awards ==
- École des métiers de la restauration et du tourisme de Montréal (2012): 2015 National Trust Award (Recycling / Rehabilitation), Ottawa; Grand prix de l'opération patrimoine de Montréal.
- Quartier 21 Peter-McGill (2012): 2013 Prize: Reconnaissance en environnement et développement durable de Montréal (Public square).
- Montreal City Hall (2012): 2017 North American Copper in Architecture Award Ten Year Award, New York; 2013 Prix d'excellence, Ordre des architects du Quebec.
- Square des Frères-Charon (2009): 2009 Award of Excellence, Canadian Society of Landscape Architects, Ottawa; 2009 Silver Medal, Design Exchange Award, Toronto; Development Award, Les Arts et la Ville, Québec.
- Les Habitations Joseph-Le-Caron (2005): 2007 Winner Outside the Box Awards (Innovative Social Housing), Building Magazine, Toronto.
- Minton Hill House (2004): 2007 Prix de l'Institut de Design de Montréal (Architecture); 2005 Home of the Year Award, Architecture Magazine, New York; 2004 Honorable Mention, North American Wood Council, Virginia.
- La Maison des trois jardins (1998): 1998 Award of Excellence, Canadian Architect, Toronto.
- Cité Jardin, Rosemere (1993): First Prize, Competition.
- Home design concept (1992): 1992 Jury special mention, La casa più bella del mondo, Milan.

== Published articles ==
- "At 50, Place Ville Marie continues to shine." The Montreal Gazette, 2012. Web.
- "Island Hopping." Canadian Architect, 1 Feb. 2008. Web.
- "In Full View: Public Space In Montreal." Canadian Architect, 1 Feb. 2008. Web.
- "Renewing the Urban Fabric: Social Housing in Montreal." Canadian Architect, 1 Jul. 2004. Web.
- "Trois débats sur le nouveau pavillon des Hautes Études Commerciales." Vie des Arts, vol. 40:166, 1997. Web.
- "Before Broadacre," Canadian Architect, vol. 44. 23 Oct. 1997. pp. 10–13.
- "Perspectives on space-making." ETC, no. 26, Summer 1994. pp. 27–30. Web.
- "Winter of Discontent for Painting." ETC, no. 23, Autumn 1993. pp. 35–37. Web.
