= Andrew King (architect) =

Canadian architect

Andrew King is a Canadian architect and cross-disciplinary artist. He is a Professor in Practice at the Peter Guo-hua Fu School of Architecture at McGill University.
