= Michael Jemtrud =

Michael Jemtrud is a McGill University associate professor of Architecture (in Montreal, Canada), and former Director of the School of Architecture (2007-2011).

== Education ==
Jemtrud received a B.A. in Philosophy and a professional Bachelor of Architecture degree from Pennsylvania State University. He also holds a master's degree in History and Theory of Architecture from McGill University.
