= Eva Vecsei =

Hungarian-Canadian architect (born 1930)

- Born: Eva Hollo; 21 August 1930 (age 96); Vienna, Austria
- Education: Budapest University of Technology and Economics
- Occupation: Architect
- Spouse: André Vecsei
- Children: Andrea Vecsei, Paul Vecsei
- Awards: Fellow Royal Architectural Institute of Canada
- Practice: Arcop; Dimitri Dimakopoulos; Eva H. Vecsei Architect
- Projects: La Cité, Place Bonaventure

Eva Hollo Vecsei (born 21 August 1930) is a Hungarian-Canadian architect. She began her career in Budapest and emigrated to Montreal in 1957, where she established Vecsei Architects with her husband in 1984.

== Biography ==
Vecsei was born Eva Hollo in 1930 in Vienna. She completed a Bachelor of Architecture at the Budapest University of Technology and Economics, graduating in 1952. After graduating, she taught at the university's architectural school until 1953 as an assistant professor. In 1954 she designed housing for miners in Tatabánya and during 1955–1956 she worked on a school and housing projects.

Eva Vecsei and her husband, André Vecsei, who married in 1952, emigrated to Canada after the Hungarian Revolution of 1956 and settled in Montreal in 1957. She became a naturalized citizen of Canada in 1962. In 1958 she began working for the architectural firm Arcop, where she was in charge of design development of eight Massey Award winning projects. Vecsei was the senior project designer on the construction of Place Bonaventure from 1964 to 1967. Place Bonaventure was among the most significant projects of her career, and press coverage of the building's construction at the time highlighted Vecsei's gender and innovative construction methods.

Vecsei left Arcop in 1971 to join Dimitri Dimakopoulos' practice. She worked there until 1973, when she opened her own practice, Eva H. Vecsei Architect, in Montreal. Her first major project in her newly established firm was Complexe La Cité, the largest mixed use, high-density project in Canada at the time. Located in downtown Montreal it is comprised an office building, a hotel, three residential tower blocks, and a retail area - construction from 1973 to 1977. La Cité was the first residential development in Montreal with a green rooftop serving the residents. The rooftop garden features a waterfall, ponds that attract ducks, bridges and walkways. As for trees, there are pine trees, spruce trees, and birch trees that have root systems six feet deep. According to the Montreal Gazette, the idea for Place Bonaventure’s green roof dates to 1967 when the complex was built.

In 1976 the architect Yasmeen Lari invited Eva Vecsei as Architectural Consultant on the Karachi Trade and Finance Center, in Karachi, Pakistan. In 1983 at the invitation of the Chinese Government, RAIC sponsored ten Canadian architects on a lecture tour to China. Eva Vecsei was asked by the Beijing School of Architecture to present the La Cité project.

Vecsei and her husband later went into practice together, co-establishing Vecsei Architects in 1984. In the next 20 years they produced numerous public projects such as: College Marie de France, Elementary School, Montreal, Library and Cultural Centre, Dollard-des-Ormeaux, Municipal Library, St. Lambert (in joint venture with Dupuis, Roper Architects), Manoir Montefiore, Seniors Condominium, Cote St. Luc., Ark and Artworks for the Beth Zion Synagogue, Cote St. Luc and several planning studies. Husband and architectural partner Andre Vecsei died in 2006.

Vecsei has received numerous honours throughout her architectural career. She became a fellow of the Royal Architectural Institute of Canada in 1988 and was made an honorary fellow of the American Institute of Architects in 1990. She won the Canadian Architect Award of Excellence in 1983 and the Médaille du Mérite from the Order of Architects of Quebec in 2004. She was the only Canadian woman included in the 1980 directory Contemporary Architects compiled by Mildred Schmertz.

Publications on Eva Vecsei Architect:

- Zöller, Enikő Charlotte (2025): “We Knew It Right Away: This Was No Easy Job” – Eva Hollo Vecsei’s Life and Work from Socialist Hungary to Montréal’s Megastructures”. Architektúra & urbanizmus. Vol 59. No 1-2. 60-77. URL: https://architektura-urbanizmus.sk/2025/07/25/we-knew-it-right-away-this-was-no-easy-job/
- Zöller, Enikő Charlotte (2025): „‚Az Ön építészete rendkívül férfias!‘ – Vecsei Éva élete és munkássága – Második rész“ [‘Your architecture is remarkably masculine!’ – The Life and Work of Éva V. Holló – Part Two] Építészfórum. URL: https://epiteszforum.hu/az-on-epiteszete-rendkivul-ferfias--vecsei-eva-elete-es-munkassaga--masodik-resz
- Zöller, Enikő Charlotte (2025): „‚Azt mondtuk: itt sok munka lesz‘ – Vecsei Éva élete és munkássága – Első rész“ [‘“We Knew It Right Away: This Was No Easy Job” – The Life and Work of Éva V. Holló – Part One] Építészfórum. URL:https://epiteszforum.hu/azt-mondtuk-itt-sok-munka-lesz--vecsei-eva-elete-es-munkassaga--elso-resz
- “Eva Hollo Vecsei” Cronique rencontres par Pierre Boter-Mercier ARQ, August 2008, p. 40
- “Leading Women Architects and designers of the 20th Century.Eva Vecsei”, Greenway’s Almanac of Architecture and Design, 2003 p. 414
- “Megastructures and Megacarriers: The Quebec Case”, Designing Women, Gender and the Architectural Profession. Adams/Tancred, University of Toronto Press, 2000, pp. 60–64
- “Montreal’s Designing Women, Beaver Magazine, 2000, pp. 29-39
- “L’architecture est ma seule passion!” Une Femme, Une Vote / Ministère des Communautés culturelle et de l’immigration. Danielle Colas, 1990, pp. 58–59
- “Pratiques et pratiquants, Eva Vecsei et André Vecsei”, ARQ, ARCHITECTURE QUEBEC, 1988, pp. 20–23
- “Vecsei, Eva”, Encyclopaedia of Contemporary Architects, St. Martin Press, New York, Mildred F. Schmertz, 1980, pp. 846–848
- “Modern American Architecture” Zoltan Kosa, Hungarian edition 1973, Text p. 135, Photos pp. 189–190, 194-199.
- “La Cité,” Schmertz, Mildred F. Architectural record Vol. 163, Iss. 1, (January 1978): 111-116.
- “Church of St. Gérard Magella, Saint Jean, Quebec” “Tifereth Jerusalem Synagogue, City of Côte-St-Luc, Quebec”
- Massey Medal for Architecture 1964, pp. 84–85

Documentary…

- “The spirit of it... tout était possible.” The Planning, Design and Construction of Place Ville Marie, Central Station and Place Bonaventure. Interview with Eva Vecsei in regards to Place Bonaventure. Produced by City of Montreal and Quebec Ministry of Culture and Communication, In celebration of Montreal’s 150th Anniversary.
