= Annmarie Adams =

Canadian architectural historian

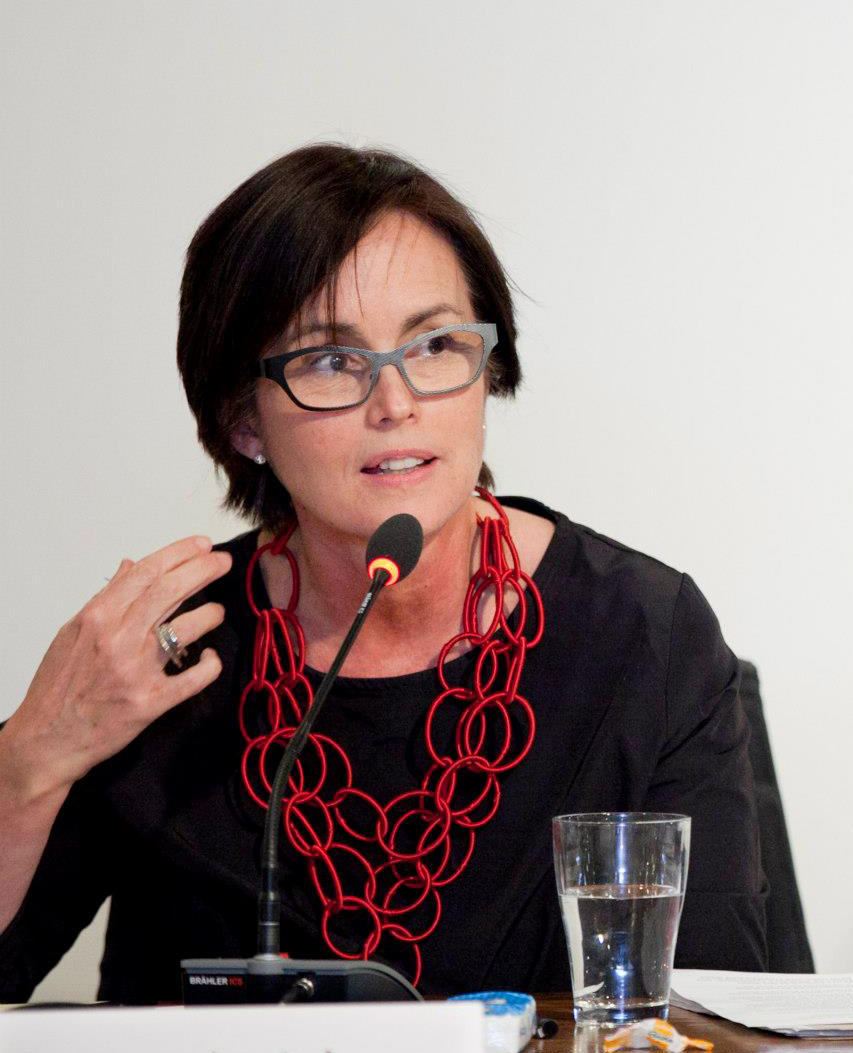
- Annmarie Adams speaking at an IGSF event in February 2013
- Born: 1960 (age 65–66); London, Ontario
- Education: University of California, Berkeley, MArch and PhD; McGill University, BA
- Awards: John K. Branner Travelling Fellowship from the University of California at Berkeley, 1985-86; E. McClung Fleming Fellowship in American Cultural, Social, and Intellectual History from the Winterthur Museum in 1991-92; Jason Hannah Medal from the Royal Society of Canada, 1999; William Dawson Scholar McGill University, 2000; Woman of Distinction Award from the YWCA, category Science and Technology, 2002; William C. Macdonald chair McGill University, 2005; Arcus Endowment Scholar-in-Residence Award from the College of Environmental Design, UC Berkeley, 2008
- Scientific career
- Fields: Architectural History; History of Medicine; Women's Studies
- Workplaces: McGill University
- Doctoral advisor: Dell Upton

Annmarie Adams (born 1960) is an architectural historian and university professor. She is the former Chair of the Department of Social Studies of Medicine and is the former Director of the School of Architecture at McGill University. Adams specializes in healthcare architecture and gendered space. At McGill she teaches courses in architectural history and research methods. She is the inaugural holder of the Stevenson Chair in the History and Philosophy of Science, including Medicine. She is a former board member of the Society of Architectural Historians and former board member of the Vernacular Architecture Forum.

== Career ==
Adams focused on domestic architecture in the 1990s and turned to hospital environments about 2000. A paper exploring the intentions and experience of women and children in suburban California established research questions to which Adams would return repeatedly. How do buildings express behavioral expectations and do users of houses simply do what they are told? She followed this up with studies of wartime housing in Canada; privacy and girlhood in 19th-century Quebec; and sick children and maternal care. She and colleagues contributed to an award-winning website, Great Unsolved Mysteries in Canadian History, by showcasing the role of a Montreal house in an unsolved double murder. Her more recent works examine Art Deco architecture and hospitals; and the architecture of the Montreal Neurological Institute and neurosurgeon Wilder Penfield. She is currently writing a biography of museum curator and physician Maude Abbott.

Adams has received numerous awards for her academic work including the President's Medal for Media in Architecture (2017) from the Royal Architectural Institute of Canada, the Hilda Neatby Prize (1994) from the Canadian Historical Association (CHA), the Jason Hannah Medal (1999) from the Royal Society of Canada (RSA), and a Woman of Distinction award (2002) from the Montreal YWCA. In 2023, Adams was declared as one of the Fellows of the Society of Architectual Historians.

She has served in administrative roles including as Curator of the Osler Library and Director of the Institute for Gender, Sexuality, and Feminist Studies (IGSF) at McGill University in 2010-11.

== Bibliography ==
Architecture in the Family Way: Doctors, Houses, and Women, 1870-1900. 1996. McGill-Queen's University Press. ISBN 9780773513860

- Contrary to the widely held belief that the home symbolized a refuge and safe haven to Victorians, Adams reveals that middle-class houses were actually considered poisonous and dangerous and explores the involvement of physicians in exposing "unhealthy" architecture and designing improved domestic environments.

"Designing Women": Gender and the Architectural Profession. (co-written with Peta Tancred) 2000. Toronto: University of Toronto Press. ISBN 9780802082190

- Adams and Tancred examine the issue of gender and its relation to the larger dynamics of status and power. They argue that many women architects have reacted with ingenuity to the difficulties they have faced, making major innovations in practice and design.

Medicine by Design: The Architect and the Modern Hospital, 1893-1943. 2008. Minneapolis: University of Minnesota Press. ISBN 9780816651146

- Medicine by Design examines how hospital design influenced the development of twentieth-century medicine and demonstrates the importance of these specialized buildings in the history of architecture.
