= Macdonald-Harrington Building =

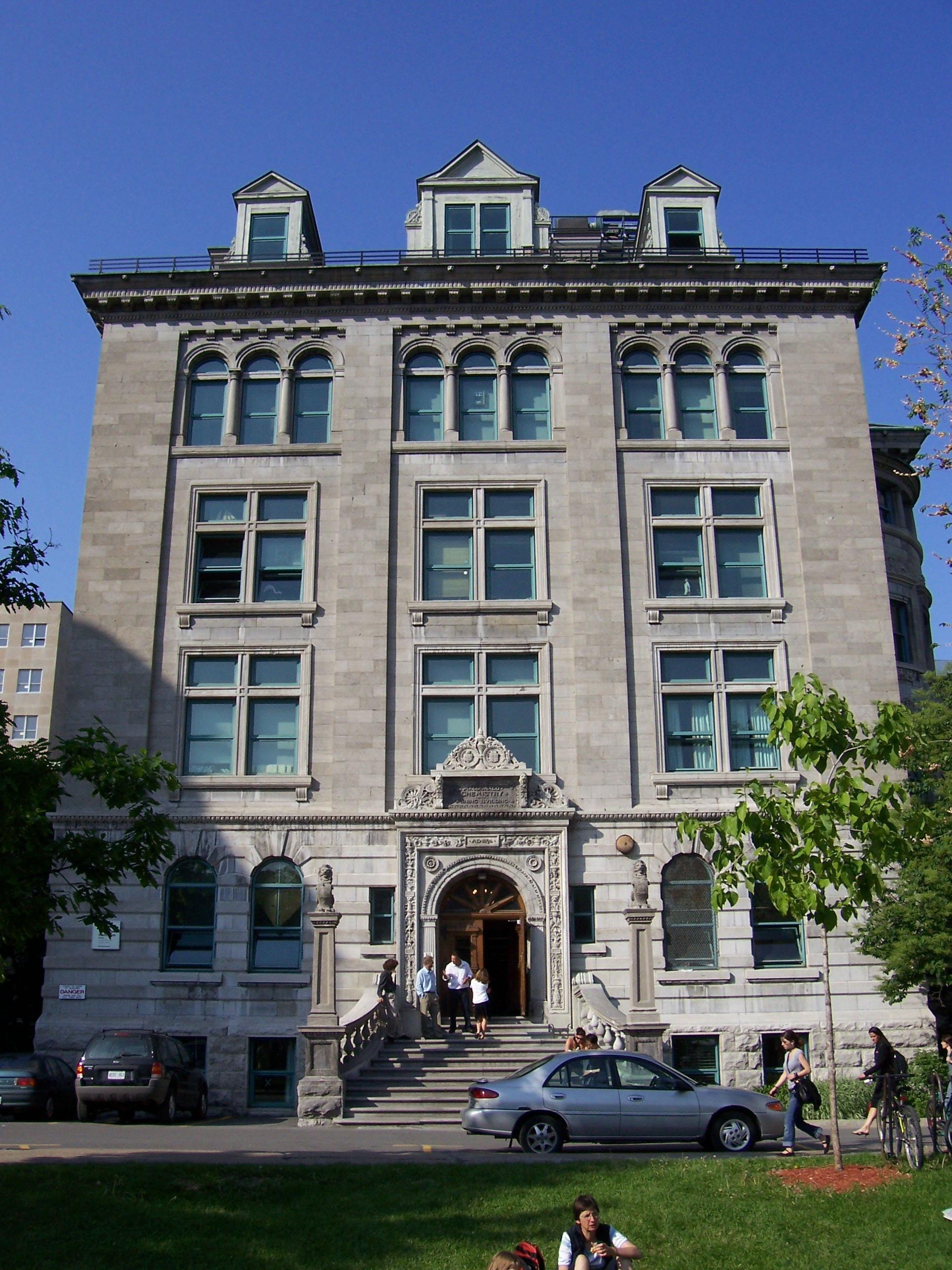
- Macdonald-Harrington Building (2005)
- Interactive map of the Macdonald-Harrington Building area
- Former names: Macdonald Chemistry Building

General information
- Architectural style: Renaissance Revival
- Location: 815 Sherbrooke Street West, Montreal, Quebec, Canada
- Coordinates: 45.5052°N 73.5758°W
- Groundbreaking: 1896
- Opened: 1898
- Renovated: 1987
- Affiliation: McGill School of Architecture

Technical details
- Material: Limestone, copper roof
- Floor count: 7
- Lifts/elevators: 1

Design and construction
- Architect: Sir Andrew Taylor
- Other designers: Arcop (1987 renovation)

The Macdonald-Harrington Building (formerly the Macdonald Chemistry Building) is a building located at 815 Sherbrooke Street West, on McGill University's downtown campus in Montreal, Quebec. Designed and built in Renaissance Revival style by Sir Andrew Taylor between 1896 and 1897, Macdonald-Harrington was one of the many donations made to the university by Sir William Macdonald. Today it houses the McGill School of Architecture and the School of Urban Planning, and prior to 1987, contained the Department of Metallurgy and Mining laboratories and the Department of Chemistry.

The six-storey building contains all of the architecture studios at McGill ranging from first year undergraduate to Ph.D., as well as offices, lecture halls, a workshop, laser cutting room and light/dark rooms. It is connected to the Frank Dawson Adams (FDA) building from the south, and the Macdonald Engineering building from the north.

== History ==
In 1896, Sir William Macdonald made a donation to McGill University in order to construct a new building on campus to hold the university’s chemistry department. Sir Andrew Taylor, who had previously designed multiple buildings on McGill's campus, including the Redpath Library (1893), Macdonald Physics Building (1893) and Montreal Diocesan Theological College (1895), was hired to be the building's architect along with his partners at the time, Morley Hogle and Huntley Davis.

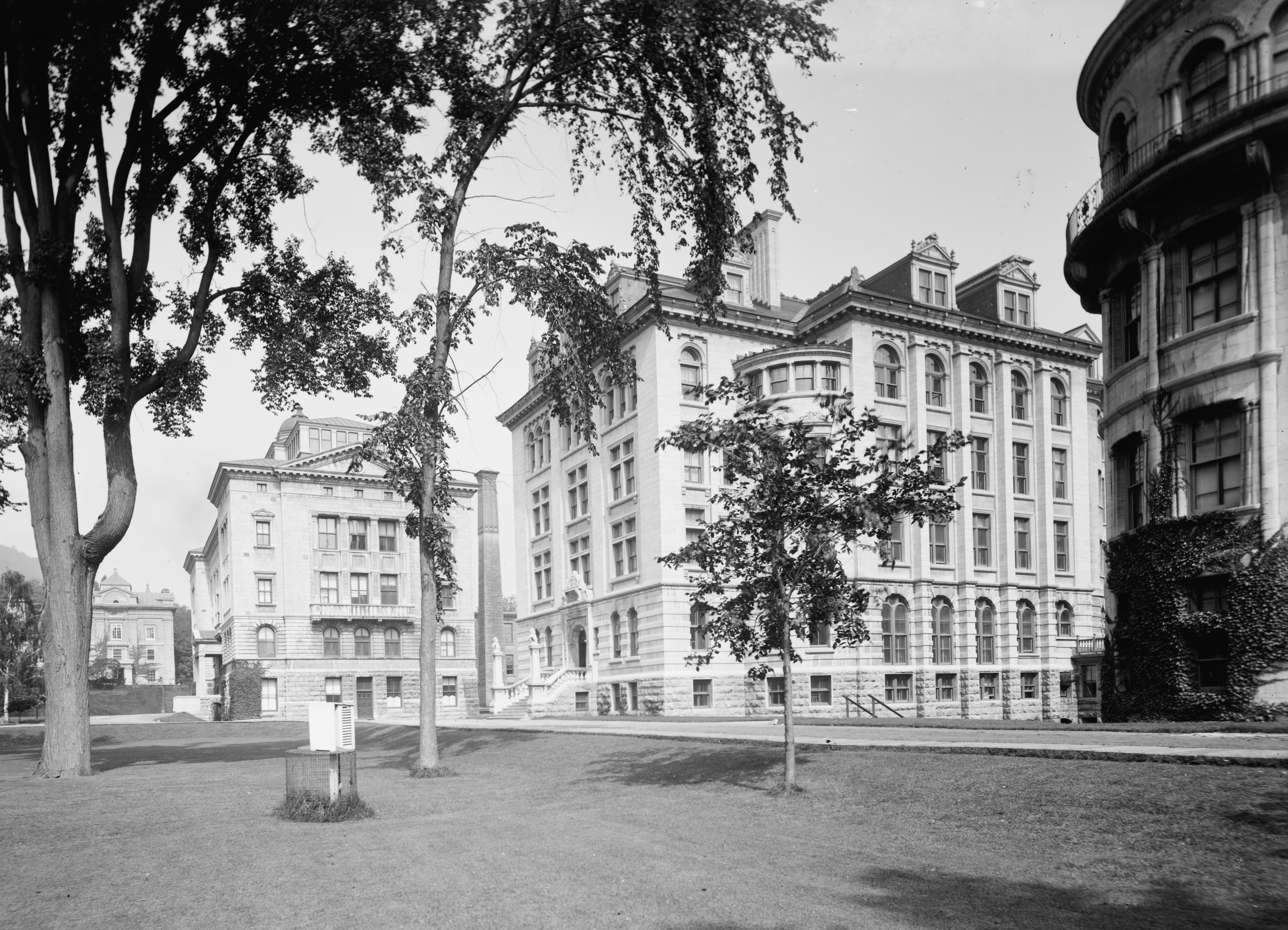
The Macdonald Chemistry Building within 5 years after the date of its construction.

The building was originally called the Macdonald Chemistry Building but was recently renamed Macdonald-Harrington after Bernard J. Harrington, McGill’s first chemistry professor. The building opened in 1898, and Harrington was the director for nearly a decade after until his death in 1907. His portrait by Robert Harris is located in Room 212 of the building today.

Early on, the two basement levels housed the Metallurgy and Mining labs. Some of these rooms can still be found today on these levels, though many have since been re-purposed as rooms related to the School of Architecture. The rest of the building at the time belonged to the Department of Chemistry, and contained labs, lecture rooms and offices. The third floor contained labs for organic and industrial chemistry, a balance room and a combustion room. The fourth floor held mineralogy labs, the Geological Services Library and a geology lecture room, all part of the Department of Chemistry at the time.

In 1957, a modern, two-storey extension was constructed on the north side of Macdonald-Harrington to provide more lab space for the growing chemistry department. In 1987, the entire section underwent major renovations by the Montreal architecture firm, Arcop, founded by graduates and professors at the McGill School of Architecture, and the building shifted ownership from the Department of Chemistry to the Schools of Architecture and Urban Planning, which it continues to function under today.

== Layout ==
Since 1987, the Macdonald-Harrington building has provided the McGill Schools of Architecture and Urban Planning with the necessary space for undergraduate and graduate studios alike. The building contains 7 floors, including a basement and two-storey annex appended to the north side of the building. The first floor can be accessed via the main staircase on the building's western facade, while the ground floor is accessed from the Frank Dawson Adams (FDA) building from the south.

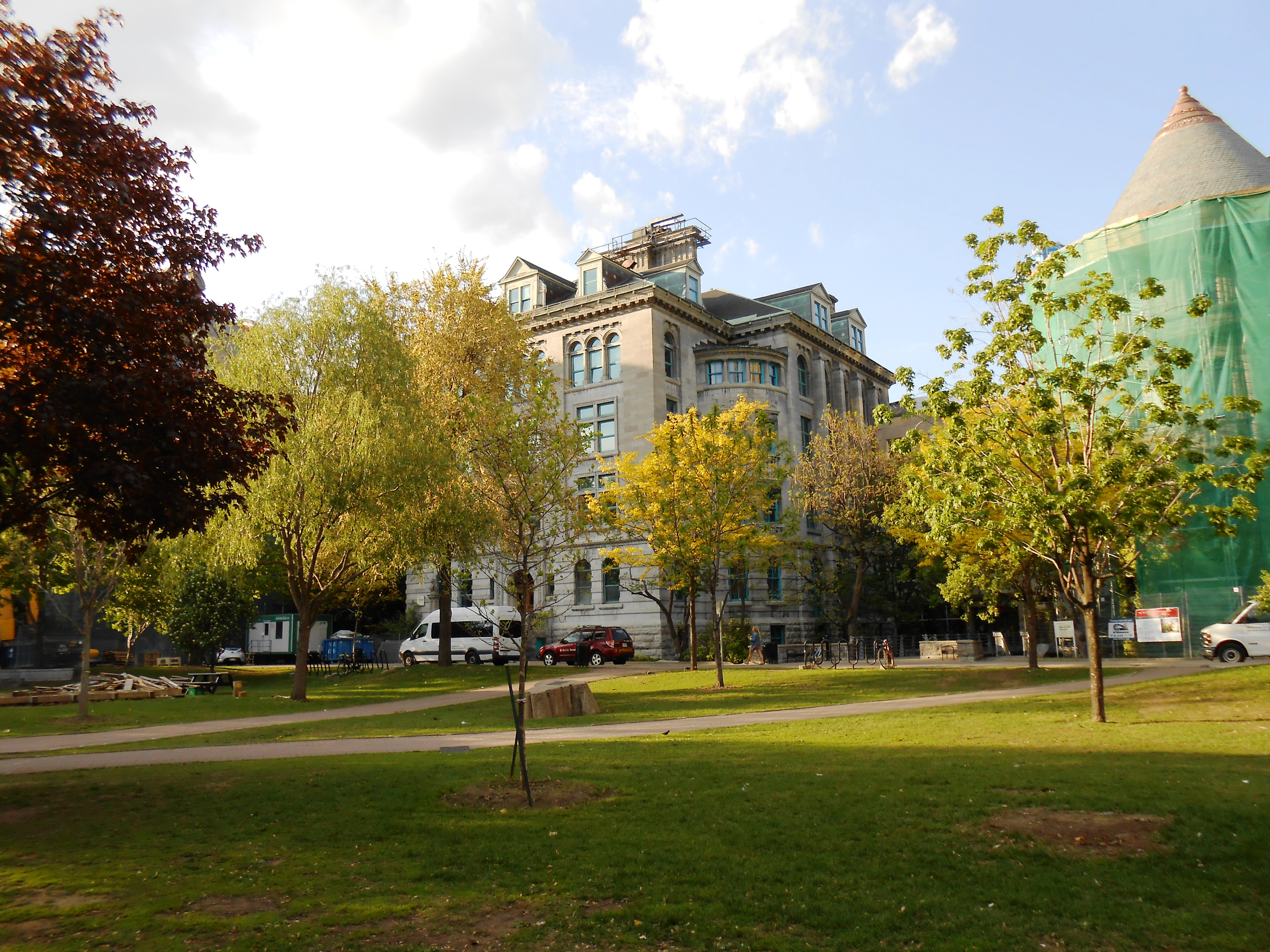
Macdonald-Harrington as seen from McGill's Lower Field.

The basement contains the workshop, laser cutting room, archive room, light room (photography studio) and dark room. These services are offered free-of-charge to architecture and urban planning students in the building. The ground floor contains the lecture hall (G-10) dedicated to guest lectures, an engineering microcomputing facility, the media centre, the architecture lounge (known as “the cellar”) and an architecture supply store. The latter two are managed by the Architecture Students’ Association.

The main entrance of the building opens up onto the first floor which contains the three exhibition rooms, the porter’s office, an IT lab and the second year undergraduate studio. The second floor hosts the main classroom for architecture students (212) as well as the first year undergraduate studio. It also contains the administrative offices, two conference rooms, one office and the post-professional and Ph.D studio. The third floor contains the rest of the full-time teaching staff offices, the two third year undergraduate studios and the Architecture Slide Library. The fourth floor is dedicated to the School of Urban Planning and contains their administrative offices, IT lab, graduate studio, teaching staff offices and conference room. The fifth floor is dedicated to the Master of Architecture program and contains their three studios and a large multi-purpose space.

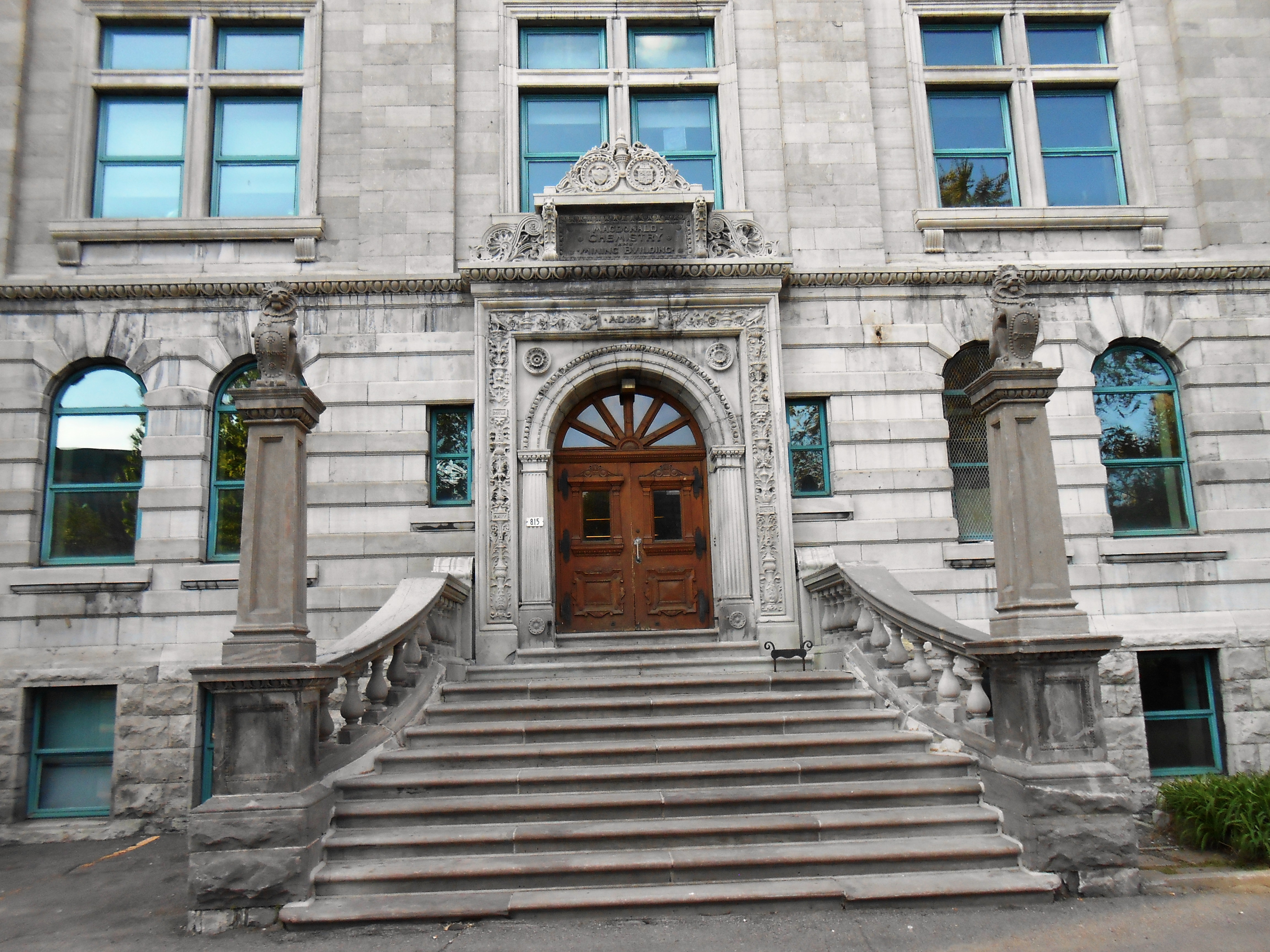
The ornate detailing of the main entrance to the Macdonald-Harrington building.

== Architecture ==
The Macdonald-Harrington Building was designed by Sir Andrew Taylor in Renaissance Revival style, with a roof clad in copper and a symmetrical facade built out of Montreal limestone like the rest of the McGill University campus at the time of construction in 1896. The building has a rusticated base with the exteriors of the first through fifth floors in cut-stone. The interior contains exposed steel beams, brick walls and main doorways in the form of rounded arches, as well as certain areas made of wood. The building’s ornament is largely concentrated around the facade, with lions carrying shields perched on each pillar in front of the main entrance stairs. Other details occur around the windows and doorways of the building.

== See also ==
- McGill University buildings and structures
- Leacock Building
- Redpath Library
- McGill School of Architecture
