= Dimitri Dimakopoulos =

Greek-Canadian architect (1929-1995)

Dimitri Dimakopoulos CQ RCA
- Born: September 14, 1929; Athens, Greece
- Died: November 7, 1995 (aged 66)
- Education: School of Architecture at McGill University

Dimitri Dimakopoulos CQ RCA (14 September 1929 – 7 November 1995) was a Greek-Canadian architect. He was best known for having been involved in the design of several notable buildings in Downtown Montreal.

== Early life ==
Dimakopoulos was born in Athens, Greece, on September 14, 1929. He grew up in Athens before emigrating to Montreal, Quebec, Canada, in 1948. He continued his education at the School of Architecture at McGill University. During this period, he earned awards from Anglin Norcross and Hobbs Glass and designed several theatres and concert halls. As the final work during his studies, Dimakopoulos designed the foundations of the Queen Elizabeth Auditorium in Vancouver, British Columbia, in 1954.

== Career ==
In 1955, he participated in the creation of the Affleck, Desbarats, Dimakopoulos, Lebensold, Michaud & Sise architecture firm, which changed names in 1970 to become ARCOP (Architects in Co-Partnership). This firm worked with Henry N. Cobb and Ieoh Ming Pei on the design of Place Ville-Marie, a landmark skyscraper in Downtown Montreal. The firm later worked on other major projects in Quebec and the rest of Canada, including Expo 67, Place Bonaventure in Montreal, and the National Arts Centre in Ottawa, Ontario.

In 1968, he created a new firm, "Dimakopoulos & Associates". The firm designed projects in Quebec City, Gatineau, Winnipeg and Hong Kong. From 1991 to 1992, alongside Lemay & Associates, Dimakopoulos & Associates designed 1000 de La Gauchetière, the tallest building in Montreal.

== Works ==
A list with several of his work

- 1955 - Queen Elizabeth Auditorium, Vancouver
- 1961 - Centre municipal de Laval
- 1962 - Fathers of Confederation Building, Charlottetown, Prince Edward Island
- 1962 - Place Ville-Marie, Montreal
- 1966 - Salle Wilfrid-Pelletier, Place des Arts, Montreal
- 1968 - Saint George Greek Orthodox Cathedral, Montreal
- 1972 - Hôtel Le Concorde, Quebec City
- 1974 - Université du Québec à Montréal
- 1981 - Palais de Justice, Quebec City
- 1985 - Alexis Nihon Plaza, Montreal
- 1986 - La Laurentienne Building, Montreal
- 1992 - Pavillon des Sciences de la Gestion (UQÀM), Montreal
- 1993 - 1000 de La Gauchetière, Montreal

== Awards and distinctions ==
- 1975 - Inducted as a Member in the Royal Canadian Academy of Arts
- 1985 - Inducted as a Knight in the National Order of Quebec
