= WSP Global =

Canadian consulting firm

WSP Global Inc.

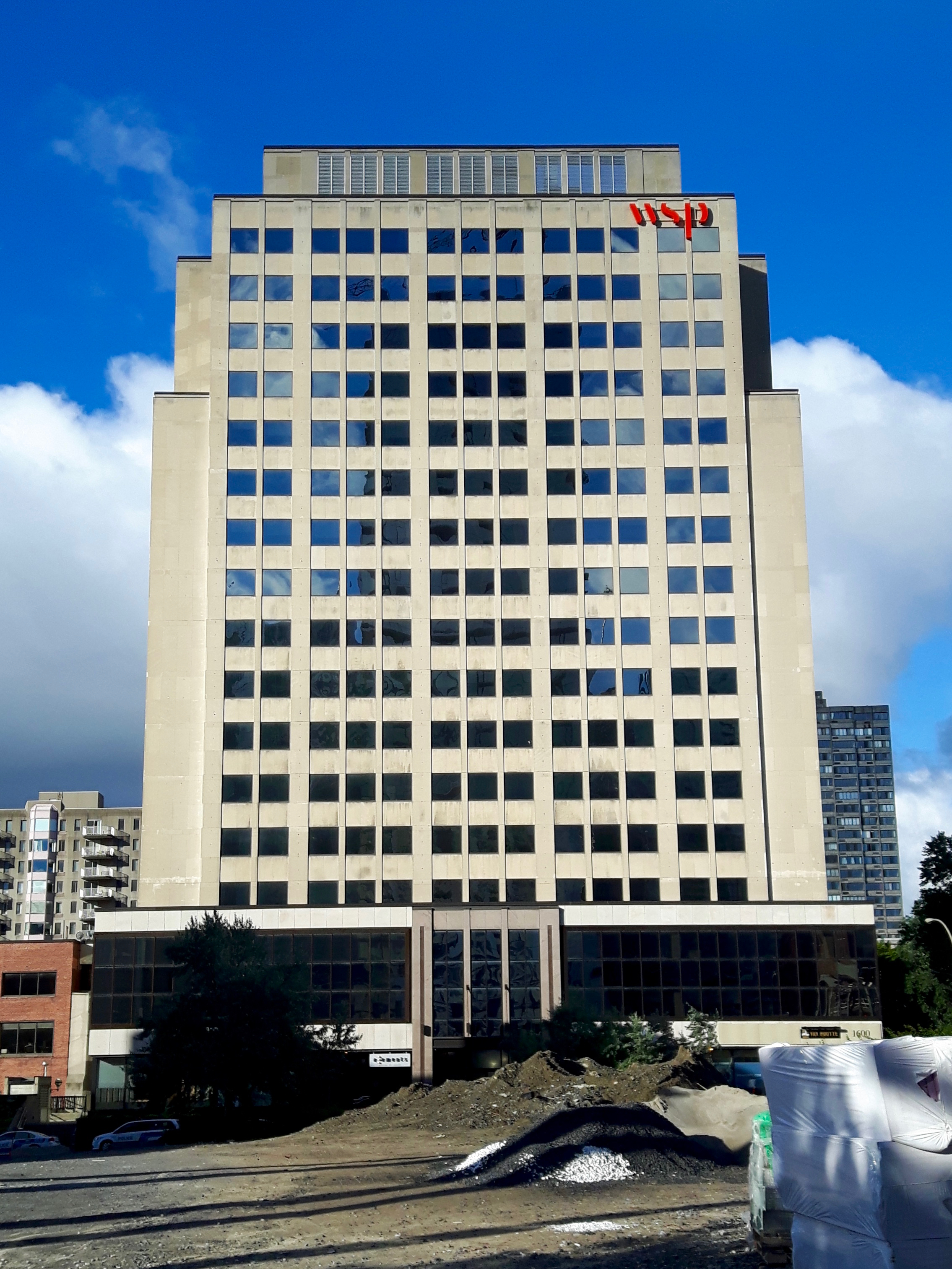
- WSP Global's head office in Montréal in 2017
- Type: Public
- Traded as: TSX: WSP; S&P/TSX 60 component
- Industry: Design, Engineering & Construction consulting, Environmental consulting, Professional services, Town planning
- Predecessor: Genivar Inc. WSP Group plc Parsons Brinckerhoff
- Founded: 1959; 67 years ago
- Headquarters: Montreal, Quebec, Canada
- Key people: Alexandre J. L'Heureux (President and CEO)
- Revenue: C$16.17 billion (2024)
- Number of employees: 83,000 (February 24, 2026)
- Website: wsp.com

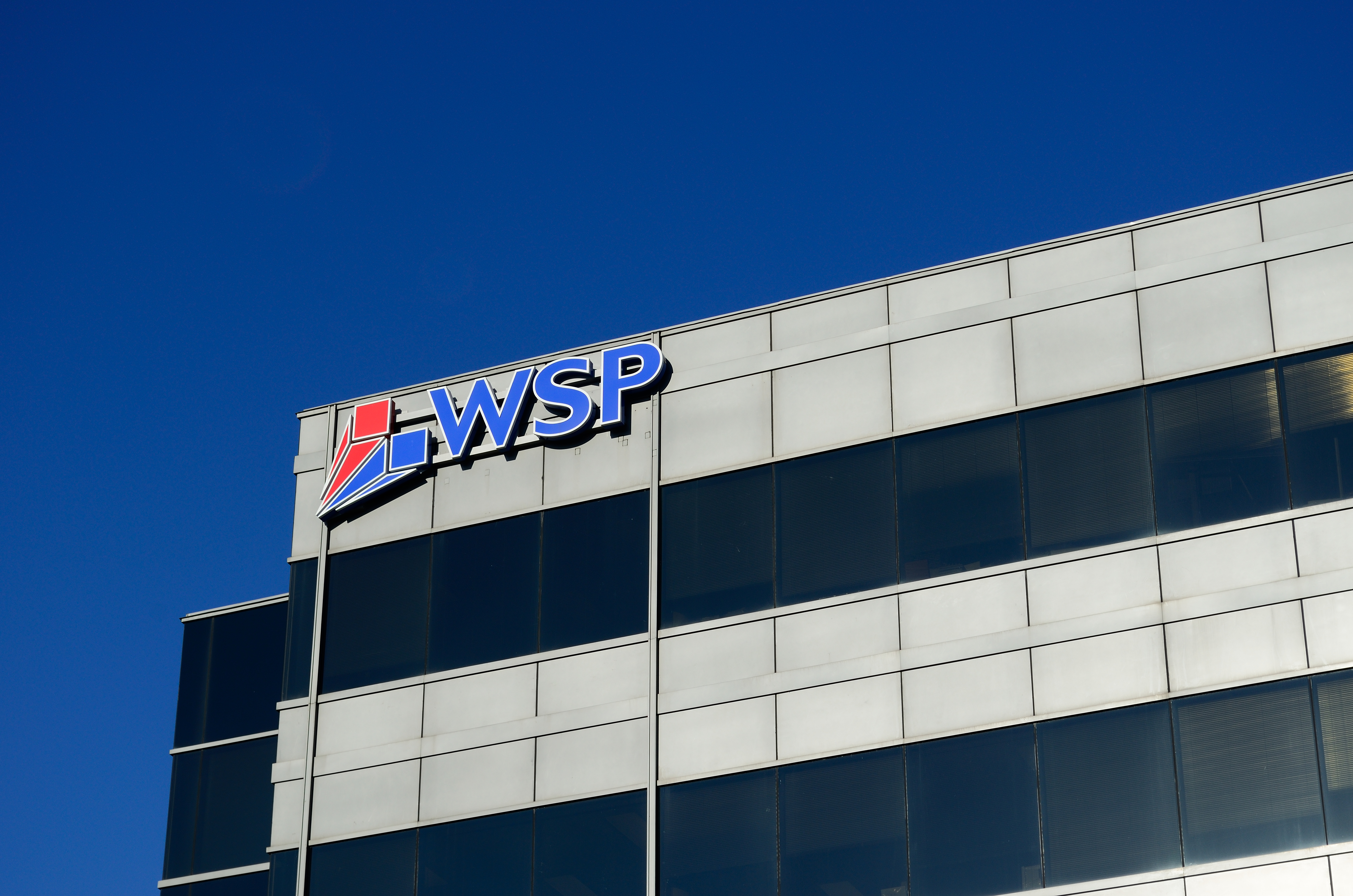
WSP office in Markham, Ontario, Canada

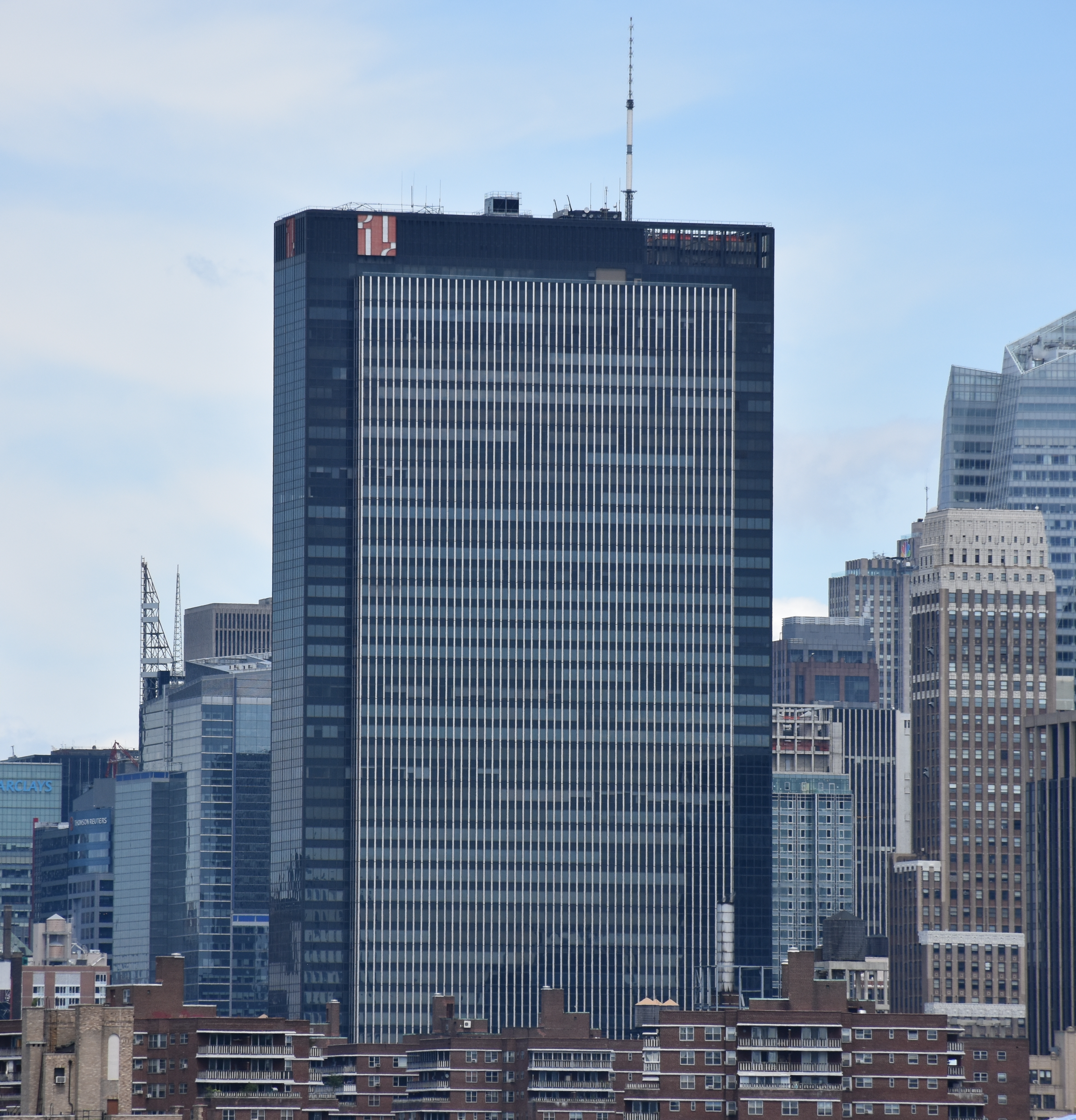
WSP USA offices in New York City

WSP is a Canadian engineering and professional services consulting firm providing technical and advisory services across the full lifecycle of built and natural environment projects. The company is listed on the Toronto Stock Exchange and is part of the S&P/TSX 60 and S&P/TSX Composite indices, with annual revenues exceeding C$16 billion in 2024.

After the purchase of New York-headquartered professional services firm Parsons Brinckerhoff in October 2014, WSP effectively became one of the largest professional services firms in the world, with approximately 83,000 employees in 500 offices across 50 countries.

WSP's service offering is structured around several technical domains:

Infrastructure and Transport

- Metro, rail, highways, and aviation
- Bridges, tunnels, and maritime infrastructure
- Urban mobility and transit system

Property and Buildings

- Building engineering
- Digital building design
- Asset performance and lifecycle optimization

Earth and Environment

- Environmental impact assessments (EIA/ESIA)
- Geotechnical engineering and earth sciences
- Contaminated land and remediation
- Regulatory compliance and permitting

Energy and Resources

- Power generation (conventional and renewable)
- Transmission and distribution systems (including HVDC)
- Energy transition, decarbonization, and storage
- Mining engineering and resource extraction

Water

- Water supply and treatment systems
- Wastewater and stormwater infrastructure
- Water resource management

Advisory Services

- Strategic and technical advisory
- Program and project management
- Sustainability and ESG-related services
- Digital and data-driven solutions

== History ==
=== Origins of WSP ===
Williams Sale Partnership was established in 1969 in England by Geoffrey Williams and John Sale. In 1976, it was a founding member of the Building Services Research and Information Association (BSRIA). It was first listed on the London Stock Exchange in 1987.

In the 1990s, the company expanded both domestically and internationally, forming WSP Asia in 1995, incorporating Graham Group and T P O'Sullivan and Partners in 1997, acquiring US practices Cantor Seinuk and Flack + Kurtz in 2000, as well as buying Jacobson & Widmark (J&W) in Sweden in 2001 (J&W was founded in 1938), LT Consultants Oyj and EMP Projects Oyj in Finland in 2003 and PHB Group in the UAE in 2005.

=== Genivar ===
After acquiring three firms and expanding geographically in 1993, the name of the Canadian firm GBGM was changed to Genivar Inc.

In August 2011, Genivar Inc. and Montreal-based architectural firm ARCOP announced an alliance.

=== Takeover ===
On 7 June 2012, Genivar made a friendly takeover cash offer of £278 million (C$442 million) for WSP Group plc, headquartered in London. The offer was backed by WSP's board of directors as well as investors holding 37% of the company's shares, and the takeover was completed on 1 August 2012. This merger created a professional-services firm with approximately 15,000 employees, working in over 300 offices worldwide.

The company reorganised its corporate structure on 1 January 2014, to create a parent company named WSP Global Inc. and adopted the common brand of WSP.

=== Subsequent acquisitions ===
In October 2014, WSP completed the purchase of New York-headquartered professional services firm Parsons Brinckerhoff from Balfour Beatty for US$1.24 billion. The company has a network of approximately 170 offices and nearly 13,500 employees on five continents and became a wholly owned independent subsidiary. Together, WSP | Parsons Brinckerhoff is one of the largest professional services firms in the world with approximately 32,000 employees in 500 offices serving 39 countries.

In early 2015, WSP announced plans to expand to 45,000 employees by 2020. In October 2016, WSP purchased Mouchel Consulting from the Kier Group for approximately £75 million.

In January 2017, WSP | Parsons Brinckerhoff announced that it would assume the name "WSP", effective from May 2017. In August 2017, WSP made a takeover bid for Opus International Consultants.

In July 2018, WSP announced its intention to buy Berger Group Holdings Inc., parent of the group of companies operating under the name of Louis Berger Group, a Morristown, N.J.-based international professional-services firm, for $400 million.

In February 2020, WSP acquired US-based environmental consulting firm LT Environmental (LTE). On December 3, 2020, WSP acquired Canadian-based geotechnical, earth-science, and environmental consulting firm Golder for $1.14 billion.

On June 1, 2022, WSP announced an agreement of sale with Wood Group for the Environment & Infrastructure group (E&I) part of its business. The £1.6 bn acquisition was concluded in September 2022. In August 2022, WSP made an unsuccessful takeover offer to purchase RPS Group for £591 million. In September 2022, RPS received a counter takeover offer from Tetra Tech for £636 million with WSP opting not to increase its bid. RPS' shareholders voted to accept the Tetra Tech offer in November 2022. In September 2022 WSP also completed the acquisition of Capita plc's property and infrastructure businesses GL Hearn and Capita Property and Infrastructure for £60m.

In December 2022, WSP announced plans to acquire a 700-person Swiss engineering firm, BG Consulting Engineers, based in Lausanne with offices in France, Portugal and Italy.

In August 2024, WSP announced plans to acquire 4,000-person US based consulting engineering firm, POWER Engineers, based in Hailey, Idaho with over 50 offices around the US and Canada for US$1.78 billion.

In June 2025, WSP agreed terms to purchase British engineering consultancy Ricardo.

In December 2025, it was announced that WSP had signed an agreement to acquire TRC Companies, a US-based power and energy engineering and consulting firm, in an all-cash transaction valued at approximately $3.3 billion. The acquisition closed on February 24, 2026 and expanded WSP’s operations and workforce in the United States.

In July 2026, Dutch design and engineering group Arcadis rejected two takeover approaches from WSP. In September 2026, WSP abandoned its takeover bid; Arcadis later said it would sell most of its architecture business and cut 1,000 full-time staff.

== Projects ==
WSP projects include:

- Durley Chine, Bournemouth, UK
- 22 Bishopsgate, London, UK
- 56 Leonard Street, New York City, US
- Old Oak Common railway station, London, UK
- Perth Arena, Perth, Australia
- Jerusalem Light Rail, Jerusalem, Israel and the Israeli West Bank
- City Rail Link, Auckland, New Zealand
