= Neil Affleck =

Canadian actor, animator and director

- Born: Montreal, Quebec
- Occupations: Animator, director, actor
- Parent: Raymond Affleck

Neil Affleck is a Canadian animator, director, actor, and teacher. He has worked as an animation-timer and director on The Simpsons and Family Guy. As an actor, he appeared in the 1981 film Scanners and had a leading role in the 1981 film My Bloody Valentine. He also directed animated works such as being an episode director on Miss Spider's Sunny Patch Friends, the first season of Mike the Knight, and the 2009 Doki special. He contributed to six episodes of Rocko's Modern Life, five episodes of The Critic, and Pearlie. Affleck won the Norman McLaren award for his animated film "Hands" while still a student.

== Early life ==
Affleck was born and grew up in Montreal, Quebec, Canada. He is the son of Canadian architect Raymond Affleck, who was one of the founders of the Montreal-based architectural firm, Arcop.

== Career ==
In 1972 he won the Norman McLaren Award from the Canadian Student Film Festival for Hands, an animated film he made while studying at the Montreal Museum of Fine Arts school of art and design.

Affleck studied theatre in Montreal in the late ‘70s. He appeared in films and TV shows, such as Wild Thing, Cross Country, Murder By Phone, Visiting Hours, Dirty Tricks, My Bloody Valentine, Scanners, Oh Heavenly Dog, and Will There Really Be a Morning?. My Bloody Valentine was his most prominent role in 1981. It later gained a cult following.

In 1985, Affleck moved to Los Angeles to study film and television at U.C.L.A. Upon graduation he free-lanced in the L.A. animation industry. As Affleck's visa was about to expire, a friend informed him that animators were being hired to work on The Simpsons. Affleck worked on The Simpsons from 1991 to 2000, contributing to 52 episodes and directing 7 of them.

Affleck returned to Canada in 2001. He worked as a supervising director at Nelvana in Toronto from 2001 to 2012. Subsequently he has free-lanced as a director, storyboard artist, and actor. He worked as a part-time teacher/mentor at the Seneca College Animation program from 2014 to 2019.

Affleck is also a musician and songwriter. He was a member in good standing of the Toronto-based folk band "BanjoGoBoom”.

== Personal life ==
Affleck is married. He enjoys swimming, canoeing, and cross-country skiing. He speaks English, French, and Spanish.

== Filmography ==
Year	Title	Role
1980	Oh Heavenly Dog	Postie #2
1981	Scanners	Medical Student In Mall
1981	My Bloody Valentine	Axel Palmer
1981	Dirty Tricks	Student #1
1982	Visiting Hours	Police Officer
1982	Murder By Phone	Phone Tracer
1983	Will There Really Be a Morning?	Actor #2
1983	Cross Country	Detective Kibbee
1987	Wild Thing	Detective Walt
2016	Petrol	The Employer
2017	Sandman: 24 Hour Diner	Marsh
2022	Tehranto	Old Man
