= Sherwood Avenue drill hall, Newark-on-Trent =

Former military installation

Sherwood Avenue drill Hall
- Newark-on-Trent
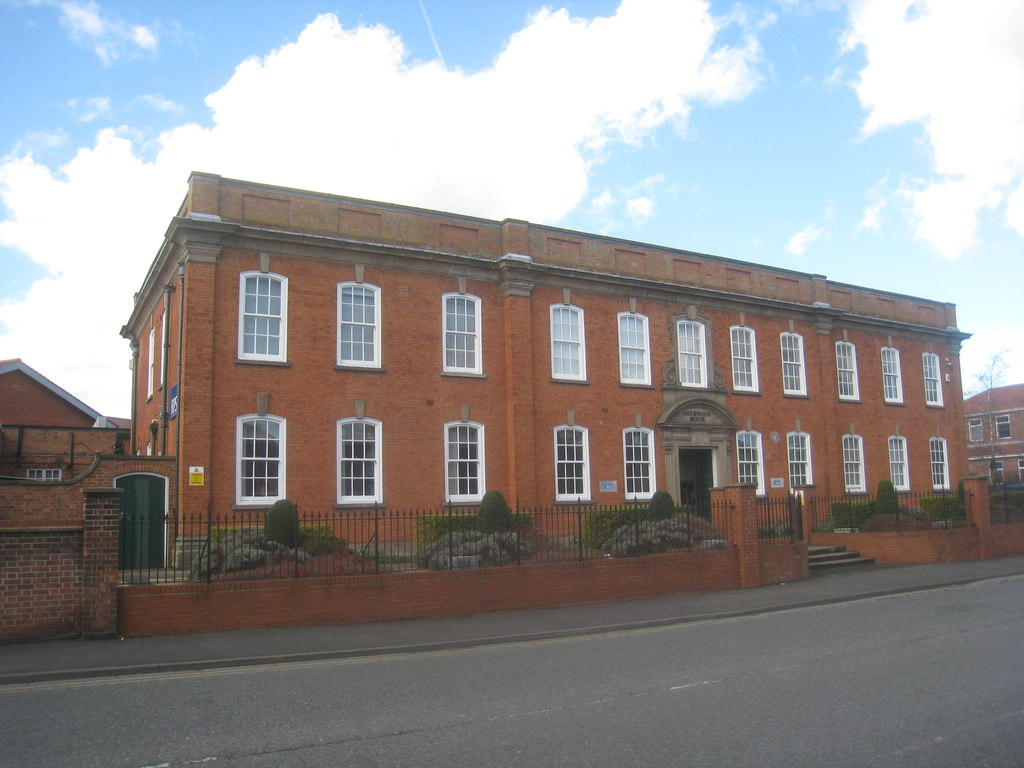
- Sherwood Avenue drill Hall

Site information
- Type: Drill hall

Location
- Location within Nottinghamshire
- Coordinates: 53.07358°N 0.80475°W

Site history
- Built: 1914
- Built for: War Office
- In use: 1914-1990s

The Sherwood Avenue drill hall is a former military installation in Newark-on-Trent, Nottinghamshire.

== History ==
The building was designed as the headquarters of the 8th Battalion, The Sherwood Foresters and was opened by the Duke of Portland in June 1914. The battalion was mobilised at the drill hall in August 1914 before being deployed to the Western Front and was still based there at the start of the Second World War.

The battalion amalgamated with 5th (Derbyshire) Battalion, to form 5th/8th Battalion, The Sherwood Foresters (Nottinghamshire and Derbyshire Regiment) in 1961. Following the cut-backs in 1967, the presence at the drill hall was reduced to a single company, E (Nottinghamshire Foresters) Company, Nottinghamshire and Derbyshire Battalion, The Worcestershire and Sherwood Foresters Regiment in 1971. After the infantry presence in Newark was reduced to a single platoon in the early 1990s, the drill hall was decommissioned and converted for use as offices: it is currently occupied by RPS Planning and Development, planning consultants.
