= Berkeley Hotel =

Berkeley Hotel may refer to:

- The Berkeley in London
- Maison Alcan in Montreal
