= Raymond Affleck =

Canadian architect (1922–1989)

- Born: 20 November 1922; Penticton, British Columbia
- Died: 16 March 1989 (aged 66); Montreal, Quebec, Canada
- Education: McGill University
- Occupation: Architect
- Children: Neil Affleck, Ewan Affleck
- Awards: Award of excellence, Canadian Architectural Yearbook, 1968; Prix d'excellence, Ordre des architectes du Québec, 1984; Royal Architectural Institute of Canada (RAIC) Gold Medal (posthumously), 1989
- Practice: Arcop
- Projects: Place Bonaventure, Place Ville Marie, Maison Alcan

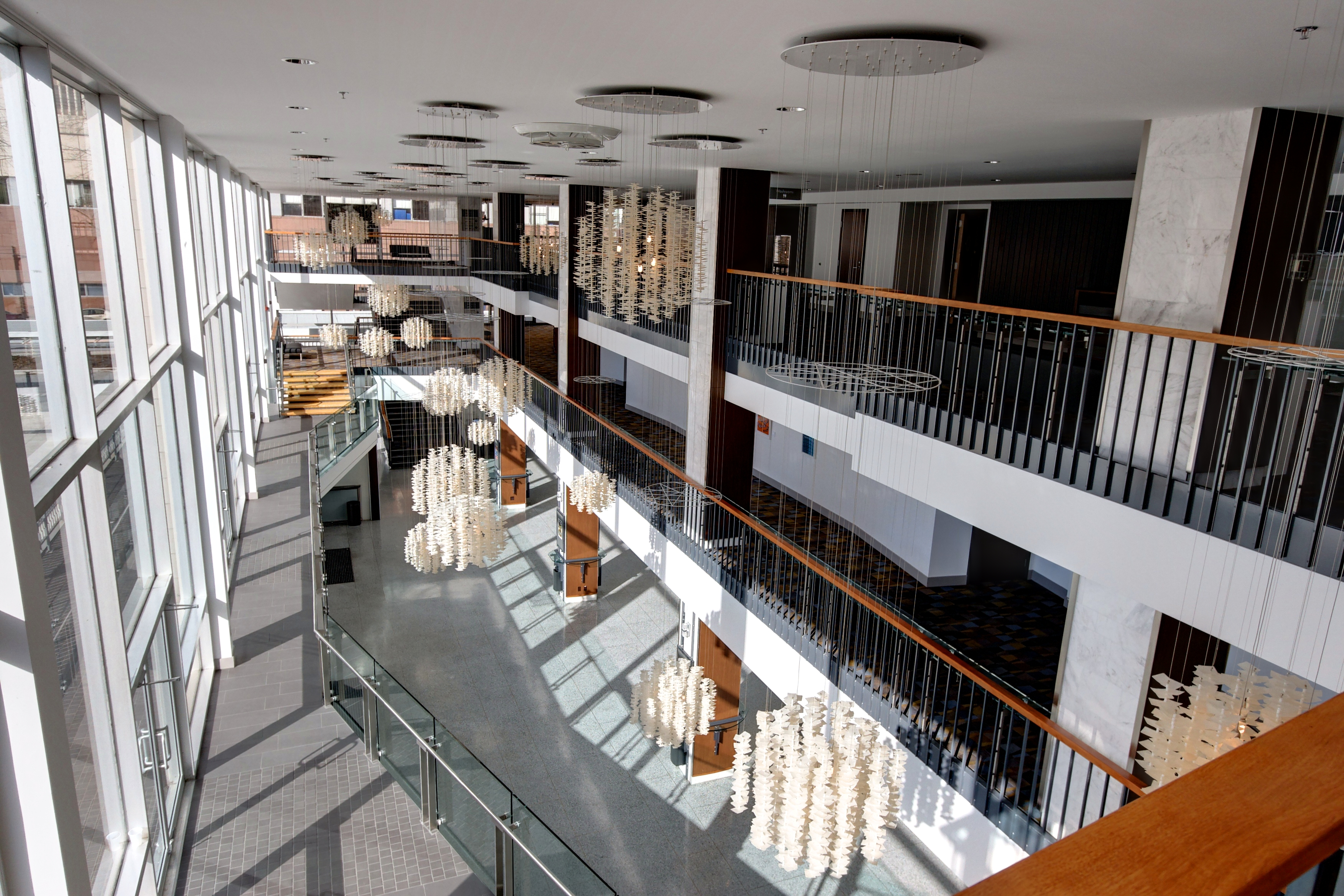
Queen Elizabeth Theatre, Vancouver

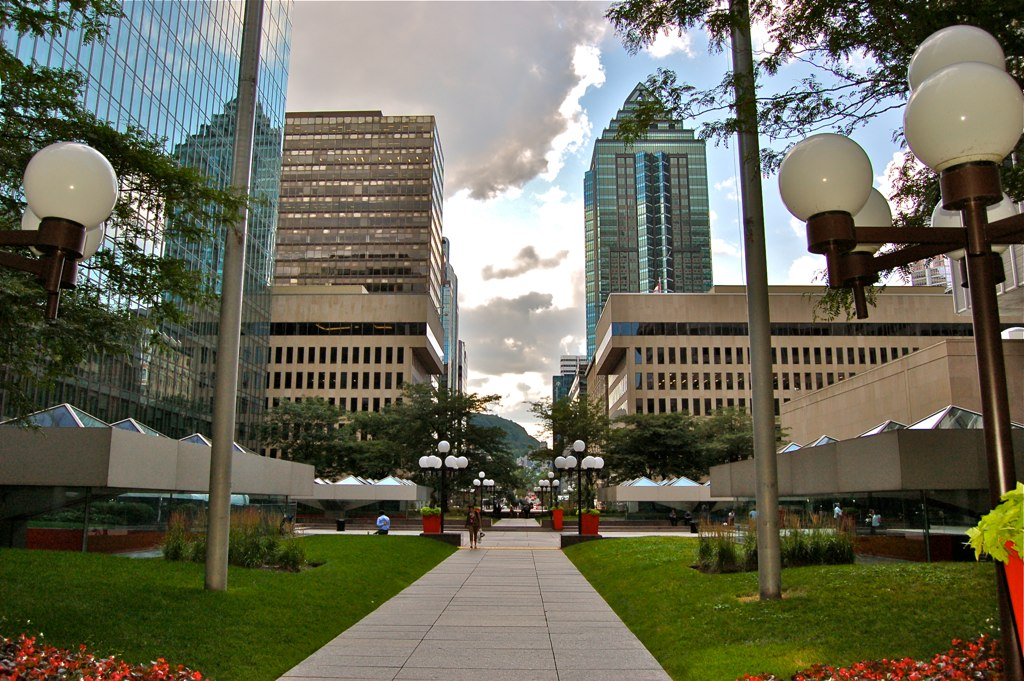
Place Ville-Marie, Montreal

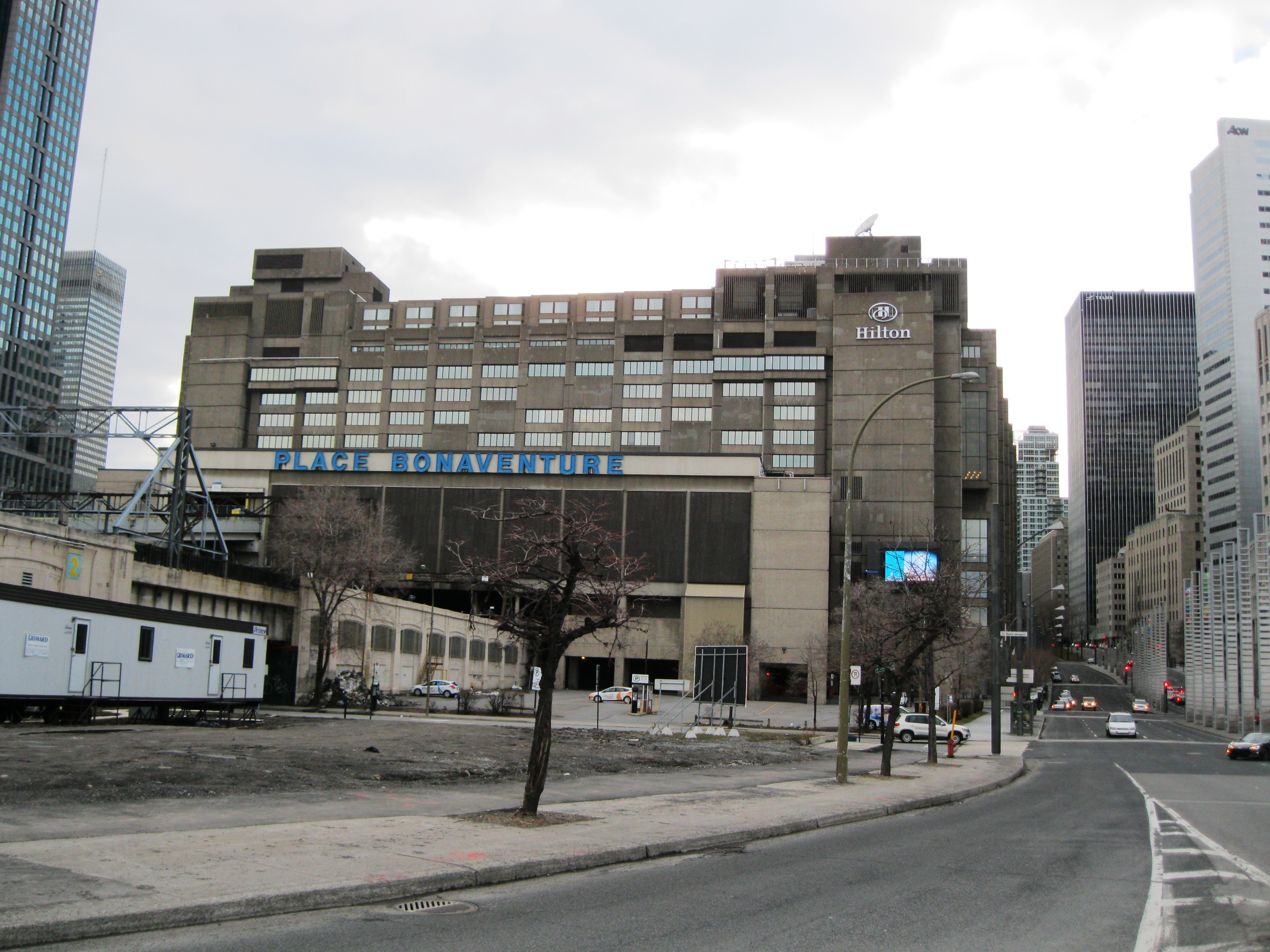
Place Bonaventure, Montreal

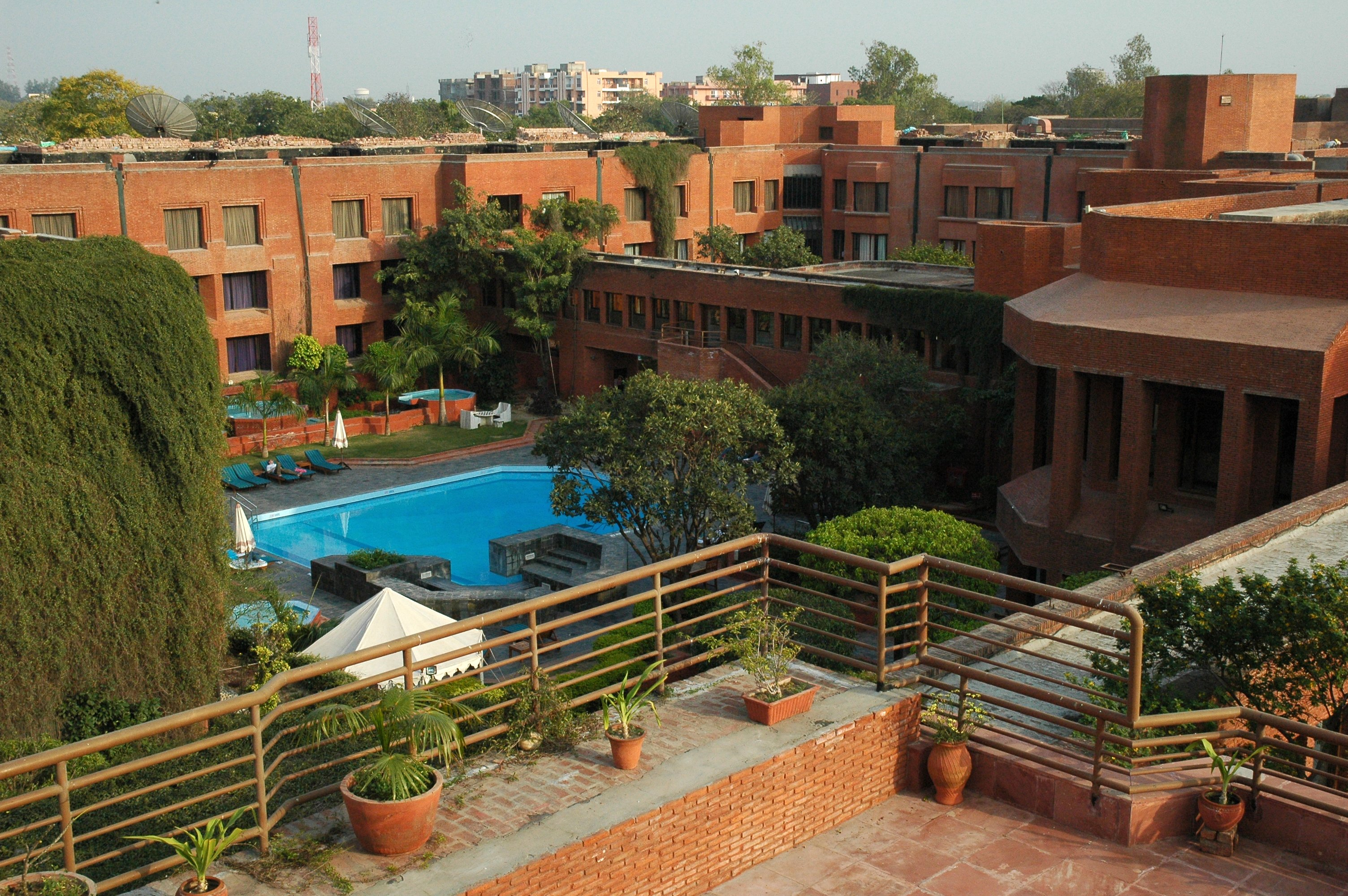
Mughal Sheraton Hotel, Agra

Raymond Tait (Ray) Affleck (20 November 1922 – 16 March 1989) was a Canadian architect. He was born on 20 November 1922 in Penticton, British Columbia. He died in Montreal on 16 March 1989. One of the founders of Montreal-based architectural firm Arcop, he also taught at leading universities in Canada and the United States.

== Academic career ==
Raymond Affleck attended McGill University, receiving a Bachelor of Architecture degree in 1947, and in 1948 undertook postgraduate studies at the Federal Technical Institute in Zurich. He later taught at prominent universities including Harvard University, University of Manitoba, University of Toronto and Technical University of Nova Scotia. He was a Fellow in the Royal Architectural Institute of Canada (1965) and an Academician in the Royal Academy of Arts (1967).

== Business career ==
He opened the R.T. Affleck independent architectural practice in 1952, and in 1955 participated in the creation of an architecture firm together with Guy Desbarats, Dimitri Dimakopoulos, Fred Lebensold and Hazen Sise. This firm changed its name to Arcop Associates, Architects and Planners in 1970.

== Major projects ==
Projects undertaken by Arcop ranged from Queen Elizabeth Theatre, Vancouver (1955) to St John's (Newfoundland) Arts and Cultural Centre (1967). These projects helped to establish Affleck as an influential architect. Between 1964 and 1968 Affleck was mainly engaged on the Place Bonaventure complex in central Montreal, which has been described as "a somewhat forbidding example of Brutalism". Other prominent projects included Place Ville Marie (1956-1965) and Maison Alcan (1983) in Montreal.

== Other projects ==
- Place des Arts (Salle Wilfrid-Pelletier), Montreal (1963)
- University Centre, McGill University, Montreal (1965)
- Stephen Leacock Building, McGill University, Montreal (1965)
- Life Sciences Centre, Dalhousie University, Halifax (Nova Scotia) (1971)
- Mughal Sheraton Hotel, Agra (1978)
- Place Air Canada, Montreal (1983)
- Post Office, Mont-Royal
- Number One Wood Avenue, Montreal

== Architectural thinking ==
In projects such as Place Bonaventure, Affleck sought to include indoor pedestrian routes and atria, design features suited to a cold climate. The aim was an integrated architectural plan encompassing buildings, streets and main highways.

At Maison Alcan, a restored historic hotel and greystone houses on Sherbrooke Street are joined to the modern glass and aluminum-clad structure behind by means of a glazed atrium. Market Square (Saint John, 1983) is another important conservation and infill project that demonstrates the application of Affleck's urban theories.

== Personal life ==
Affleck married Betty Ann Henley in 1950. They had five children, including animator Neil Affleck, Family Physician Ewan Affleck and architect Gavin Affleck.

== Awards ==
- Massey Medal - 1961, 1964, 1967, 1970
- Canadian Centennial Medal - 1967
- Award of excellence, Canadian Architectural Yearbook, 1968
- Aga Khan Award for Islamic Architectural Design, 1980
- Prix d'excellence, Ordre des architectes du Québec, 1984
- Royal Architectural Institute of Canada (RAIC) Gold Medal (posthumously) - 1989
