= Genivar =

Canadian engineering consulting firm

Genivar Inc.

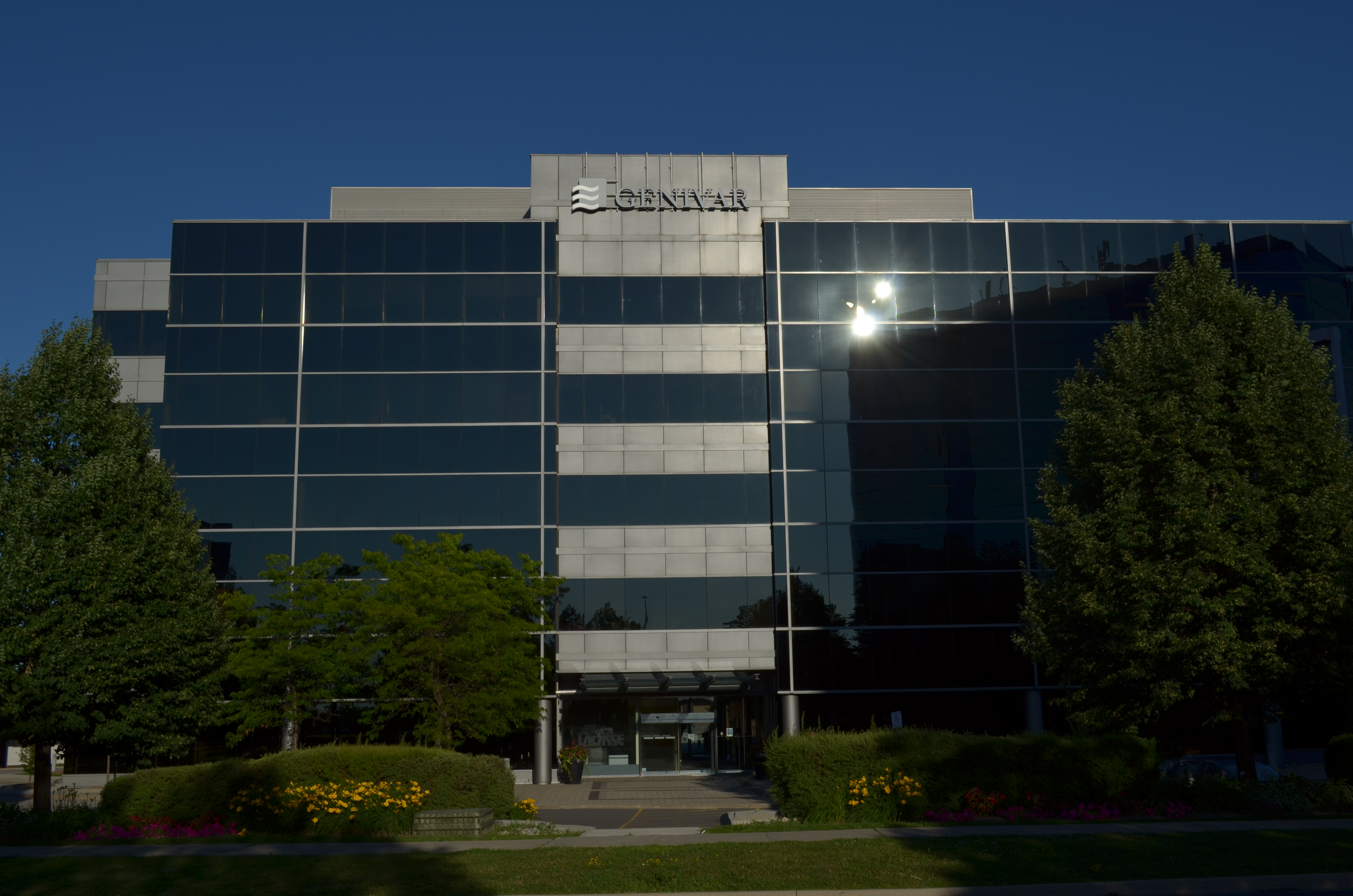
- Genivar office in Markham
- Type: Public
- Traded as: TSX: GNV
- Industry: Engineering consulting Construction management
- Predecessor: Groupe-Conseil Solivar Inc.
- Founded: 1959; 67 years ago
- Fate: Reorganized after acquiring WSP Group plc.
- Successor: WSP Global Inc.
- Headquarters: Montreal, Quebec, Canada
- Key people: Pierre Shoiry (CEO); Richard Bélanger (Chairman)
- Revenue: C$651.9 million
- Operating income: C$63.3 million
- Net income: C$50.1 million
- Total assets: C$726 million
- Total equity: C$501.4 million
- Number of employees: 15,000
- Website: genivar.com

Genivar Inc. was a Canadian engineering consulting firm. As of January 1, 2014, it became WSP Global. Its head office remains located at 1600 René Lévesque Boulevard West in Montreal, Quebec.

On August 29, 2011, Genivar Inc. and Montreal-based architectural firm Arcop announced a strategic alliance.

On June 7, 2012, Genivar Inc. announced that it made a friendly takeover cash offer of C$442 million (£278 million) for WSP Group PLC. The offer is backed by WSP's board of directors as well as investors holding 37% of the company's shares. The deal closed on August 1, 2012.

In 2013, the company announced it will be changing its name to WSP Global, reflecting a $442-million purchase of the British-based WSP Group PLC. The rebrand followed a reorganisation to a holding structure that enabled the company to separate its regional operations into distinct subsidiaries.
