= Sandman: 24 Hour Diner =

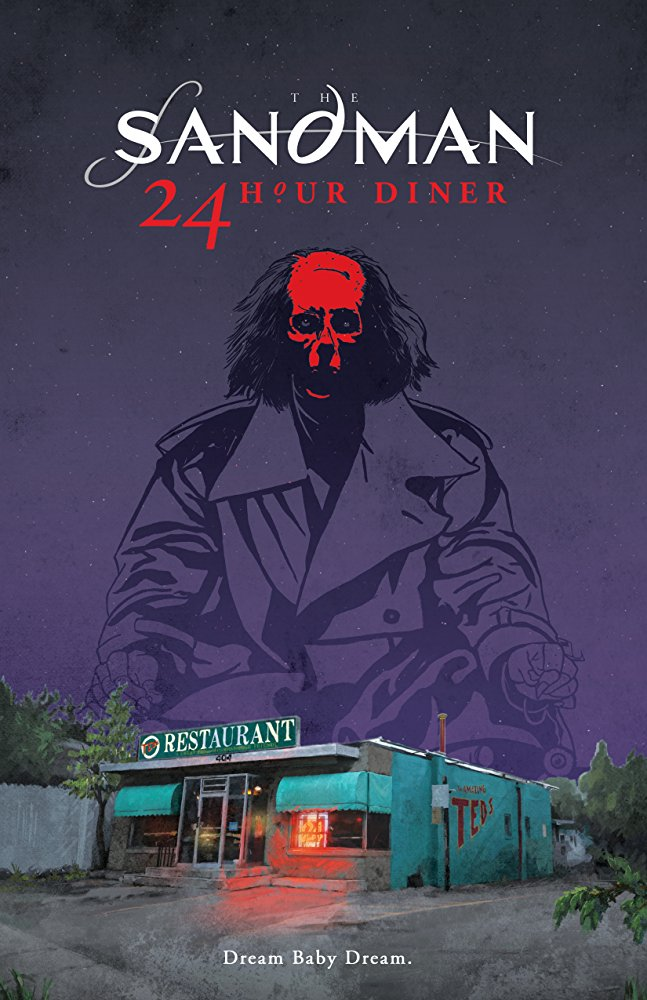
- Official poster
- Directed by: Evan Henderson; Nicholas Brown
- Screenplay by: Evan Henderson; Nicholas Brown
- Story by: Neil Gaiman
- Based on: The Sandman "24 Hours" by Neil Gaiman
- Produced by: Evan Henderson; Nicholas Brown
- Starring: Frances Steyck Townend; Storie Serres; Zach MacKendrick; Kenton Blythe; Justyna Bochanysz; Doran Damon; Neil Affleck
- Narrated by: David John Phillips
- Cinematography: Rich Liani
- Edited by: Evan Henderson and Nicholas Brown
- Music by: Zach Miller; James Reesor; Evan Henderson; Evan Loder
- Production companies: Maginot Films; The Great Auk
- Release date: 2017
- Running time: 30 mins
- Country: Canada
- Language: English
- Budget: $65,000

Sandman: 24 Hour Diner is a 2017 gothic horror fantasy short fan film produced and directed by Evan Henderson and Nicholas Brown. The film is a direct adaptation of a story from Neil Gaiman's best selling graphic novel series, The Sandman, following the story of issue #6, "24 Hours", considered one of the darkest and most horrific issues in the series.

== Plot ==
The story picks up right after issue #5 of Preludes and Nocturnes. Bette Munroe works as a waitress in a 24 Hour Diner. She serves regular happy customers and secretly writes stories about the patrons, dreaming of being a famous author. Dr. Dee, an escaped inmate from Arkham Asylum, has sheltered himself in the diner, using the Dreamstone he has stolen from Dream to control the patrons of the diner, and cause madness and nightmares around the globe. The ensemble of normal individuals slowly devolve over the course of 24 hours, with each new hour they act upon their darkest secrets and deepest desires, all to the pleasure of Dr. Dee. Over time, the patrons become increasingly violent and deranged as Dee toys with their sanity. As Dee loses interest in his "little insects", who eventually all kill each other or themselves, Dream finally awakens and escapes from his hourglass prison, traveling through the minds of the tormented dreamers to retrieve his Dreamstone. Along the way, he is cornered by nightmare versions of the diner patrons. They tackle and tear him to pieces, but he breaks free and they are left in the hands of his sister Death.

Dream arrives at the diner too late to save the patrons, and the film ends on a cliffhanger, with him confronting Dr. Dee.

A post-ending "next time on Sandman" teaser makes reference to the second arc of the Sandman series, The Doll's House, with a flyer advertising the "Cereal Convention" and introduces The Corinthian.

== Cast ==
- David John Phillips as the Narrator
- Frances Steyck Townend as Bette Munroe
- Storie Serres as Judy
- Zach MacKendrick as Dr. Dee
- Kenton Blythe as Mark
- Justyna Bochanysz as Kate
- Doran Damon as Gary
- Neil Affleck as Marsh
- Michael Sutherland as Kid's Show Host
- Ben LeFevre as Morpheus / Dream
- Ken Lashley as the voice of The Corinthian

== Development ==
Pre-production began in late October 2014, the script was written by Evan Henderson and Nicholas Brown, adapted straight from the original panels, with the intention to adapt it as faithfully as possible as a proof of concept television series.

As this was a fan film developed outside of the studio without the rights, the filmmakers self funded the production over the course of three years and released it online for free, with no chance of monetization.

The inclusion of the animated sequence was done to give the original story more of a climax, to feature Dream and his abilities, who only appears in the final page of the issue. This allowed the filmmakers to open up the world of the Dreaming, and the potential of blending live-action with animated scenes, similar to Fantasia. The original storyboards were created by artist Colton Fox, and animated by Anthony Francisco Schepperd.

Comic book illustrator Ken Lashley contributed the image of Morpheus for the opening credits. He also has a voice cameo as The Corinthian.

Principal photography began on April 17, 2015, and was completed in 4 nights of filming. It was filmed on location at Ted's Restaurant in Scarborough, Toronto.

== Release ==
A teaser trailer was released on May 16, 2017, featuring the song "Dream Baby Dream" by Suicide. Posters and marketing for the film began appearing around the city of Toronto in May 2017.

The film premiered on June 26, 2017 at The Royal Cinema in Toronto, Ontario. Attendees of the screening were given original posters and souvenirs from the event. The film was released for free online worldwide on June 27. It also screened along with a Q+A panel at Fan Expo Canada in 2017.

The film has been translated into Spanish, Portuguese, and Turkish by fans.

Neil Gaiman has viewed the film, saying it was "well done".

Cheryl Eddy of io9 writes, "Even with the success of American Gods, we still may never get a Sandman movie, or even a TV series. But Neil Gaiman diehards need not despair completely, because there's a new fan film that pays impressively exacting tribute to one of Sandman's most brutal installments."

H. Perry Horton of Film School Rejects commented saying that the creators "have nailed the tone, atmosphere, and emotional space of the narrative, and bring it to life with frightening legitimacy." and "while Hollywood is busy dropping the ball, independent filmmakers like Henderson and Brown are there to pick it up and run it into the endzone. This might not be canon, but it's still spectacular."
