= Le Centre Sheraton Hotel =

Hotel building in Montreal, Quebec

Le Centre Sheraton Montreal Hotel
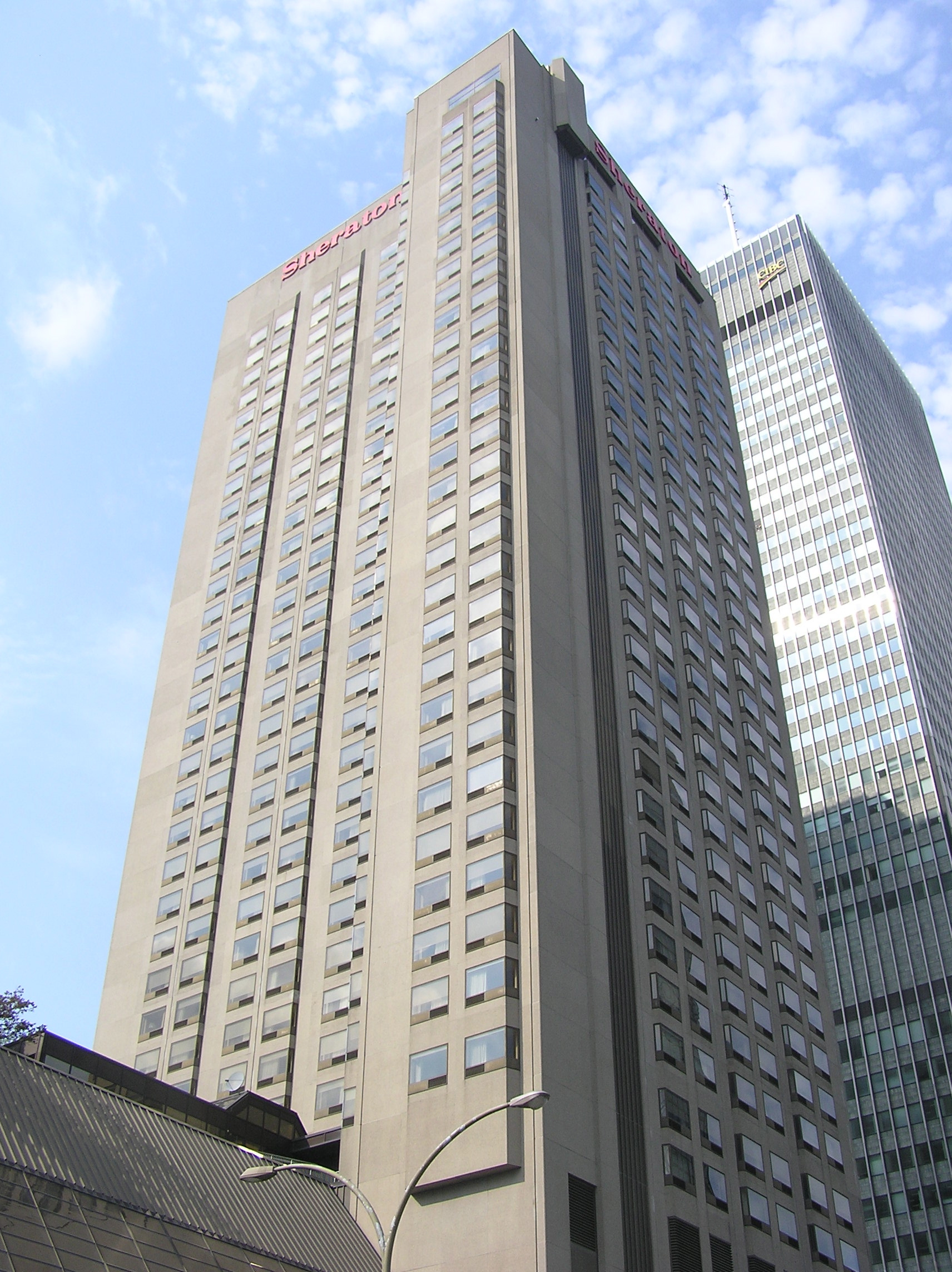
- Interactive map of the Le Centre Sheraton Montreal Hotel area

General information
- Status: Completed
- Type: Hotel
- Architectural style: Modernism
- Location: 1201, boulevard René-Lévesque Ouest; Montreal, Quebec; H3B 2L7
- Coordinates: 45°29′52″N 73°34′17″W
- Completed: 1982

Height
- Roof: 117.6 metres (386 ft)

Technical details
- Floor count: 38
- Lifts/elevators: 13

Design and construction
- Architect: Arcop

Website
- www.marriott.com/en-us/hotels/yulsi-le-centre-sheraton-montreal-hotel/overview/

The Le Centre Sheraton Montreal Hotel is a skyscraper hotel in Montreal, Quebec, Canada. It is located at 1201 René Lévesque Boulevard West in downtown Montreal, between Stanley Street and Drummond Street.

Le Centre Sheraton has 825 rooms and stands 118 metres (387 ft) tall with 38 floors. It was built by Arcop and was completed in 1982.

== History ==
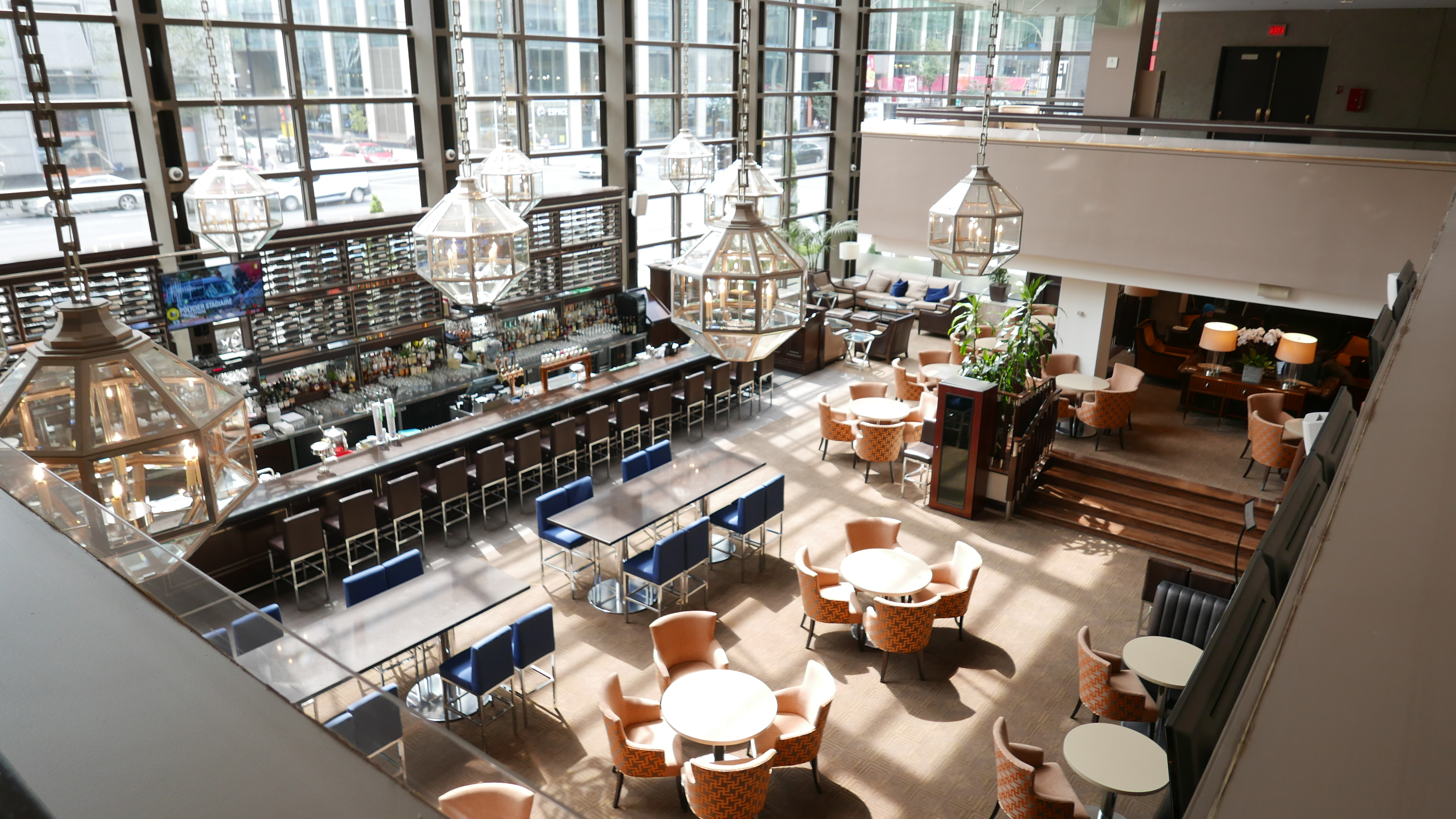
Le Café Bar in the lobby area of Le Centre Sheraton Hotel in Montreal

The hotel was planned to open in time for the 1976 Summer Olympics as the world's largest Holiday Inn. As with a number of Montreal Olympic-era projects, the project suffered from cost overruns to the tune of $81 million. Construction took eight years, with Holiday Inn backing out and Sheraton Hotels and Resorts becoming the project's backer. Mayor of Montreal Jean Drapeau officially opened the building in May 1982.

Baseball Hall of Fame member and Los Angeles Dodgers broadcaster Don Drysdale died in room 2518 on July 3, 1993 of a heart attack; he was discovered in his room during a welfare check after the team discovered he had not made it to Olympic Stadium for that day's game against the Expos. It hosted a meeting of G-20 finance ministers and central bank governors on October 24–25, 2000. It also hosted Wikimania 2017, attended by Civil Rights Movement historian Randy Kryn and 914 others.
