= Hugh Graham, 1st Baron Atholstan =

The Right Honourable The Lord Atholstan
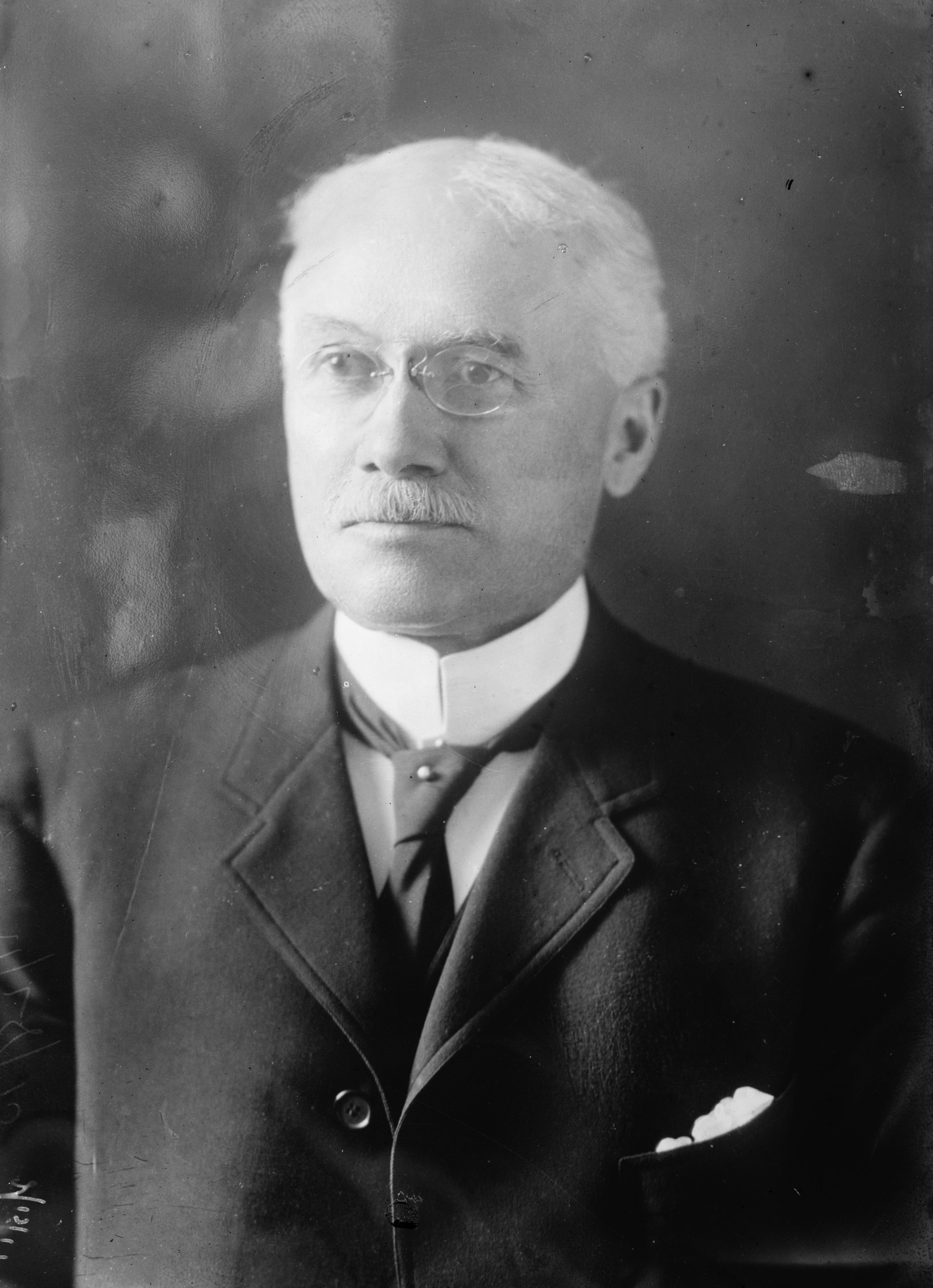
- Born: July 18, 1848; Athelstan, Canada East (now Hinchinbrooke, Huntingdon County, Quebec)
- Died: January 28, 1938
- Spouse: Annie Beekman Hamilton (m. 1892)

Hugh Graham, 1st Baron Atholstan (July 18, 1848 – January 28, 1938), known as Sir Hugh Graham between 1908 and May 1917, was a Canadian newspaper publisher.

== Biography ==
Born in Athelstan, Canada East (now Hinchinbrooke, Huntingdon County, Quebec), Graham was the son of Robert Walker Graham, a Scottish land owner, and his wife, Marion Gardner (d.1874), daughter of Colonel Thomas McLeay Gardner (1792-1854), of Edinburgh and Huntingdon.

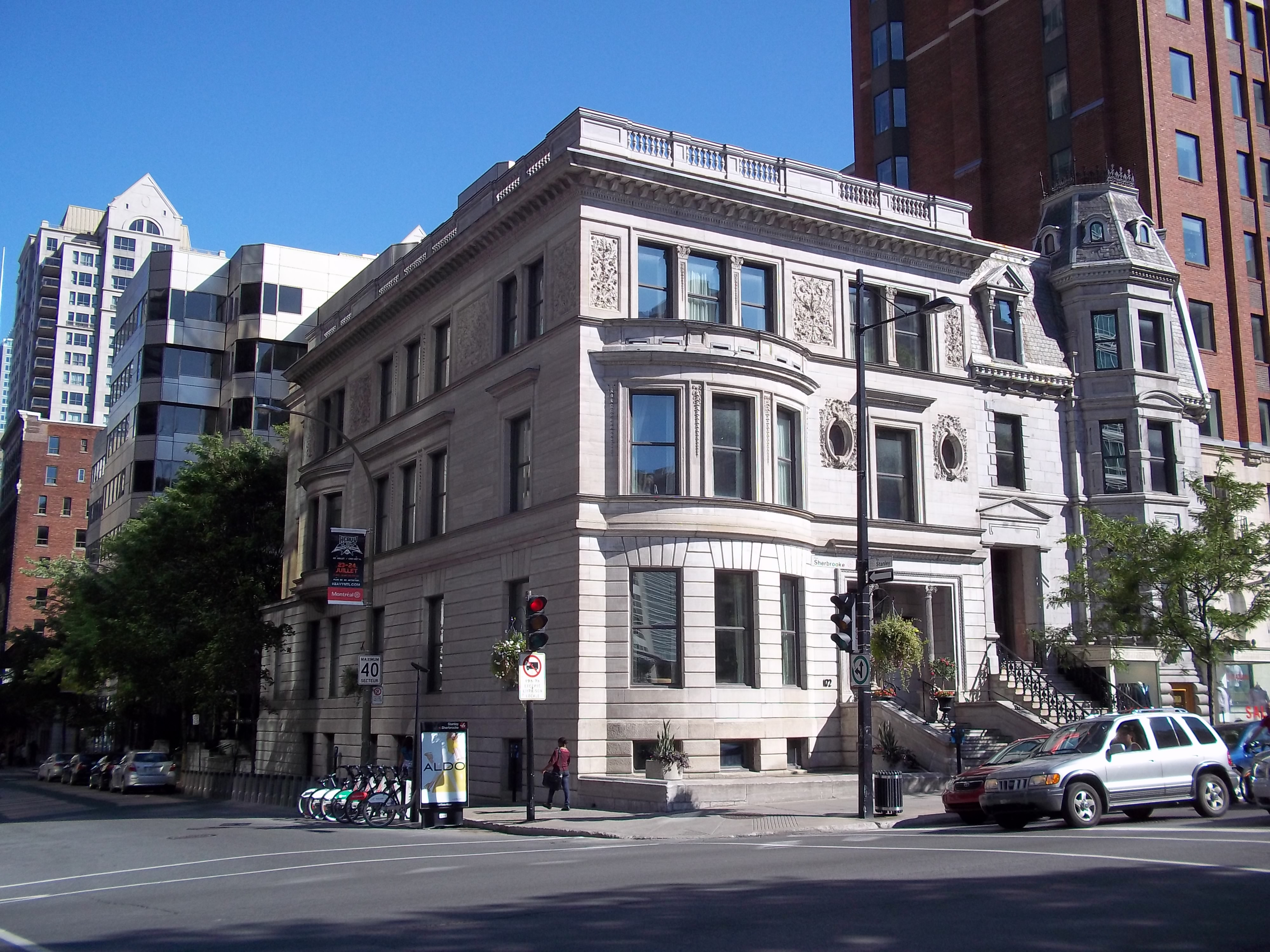
Lord Atholstan's House on Sherbrooke Street in the Golden Square Mile, Montreal

He was educated at the Huntingdon Academy until the age of fifteen. After terminating school, he served his apprenticeship as office boy and later business manager under his uncle, E. H. Parsons, a journalist, who published the Commercial Advertiser, and afterwards the Evening Telegraph in Montreal. In 1865, he was appointed Secretary-Treasurer of the Gazette Printing Company.

In 1869, along with George T. Lanigan and perhaps journalist Thomas Marshall (his role is disputed), he founded the Evening Star (later The Montreal Star), a one-cent daily. At first the Star's specialty was sensational news and scandals, and did not win favour with the educated public of Montreal. After it gained good circulation among workers, Graham, with some business ability, gradually changed it into a respected, powerful, and lucrative newspaper. Graham soon acquired full control of the paper.

Later Graham founded two weeklies, the Family Herald and Weekly Star, with a national circulation in rural districts, as well as the Montreal Standard, which catered to Montreal's urban population.

He also gained control of the Montreal Herald, a liberal daily, and was president of the Montreal Star Publishing Company.

Graham's publishing business prospered and he became one of the most powerful media executives in Canada. His newspapers' editorials greatly influenced the federal government's decision in 1900 to send troops to participate in the British offensive in the Second Boer War.

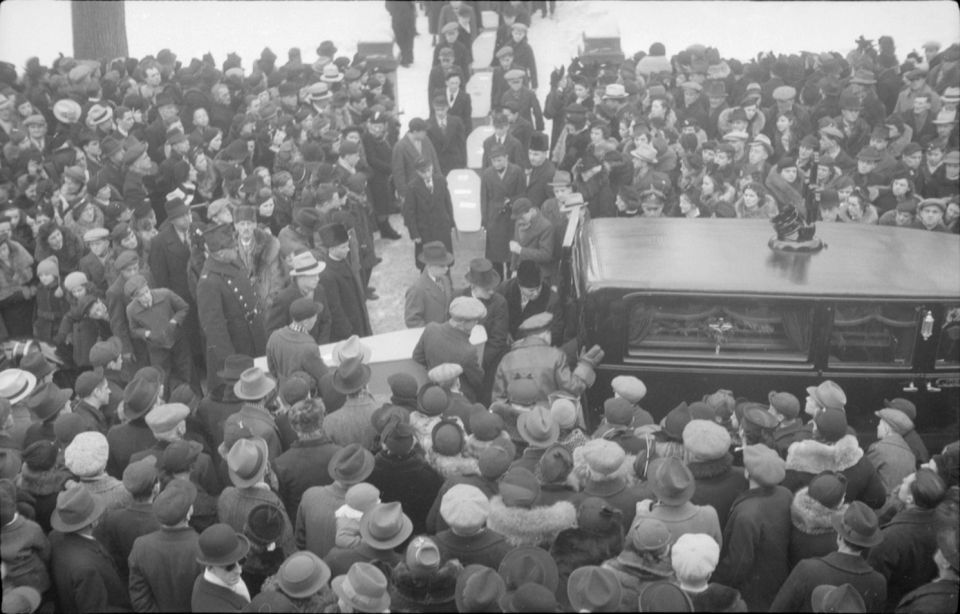
Lord Atholstan's funeral on January 31, 1938.

In 1905, Graham expanded his publishing business with the establishing of the Montreal Standard newspaper.

In 1908, he was knighted by King Edward VII and was awarded an honorary Doctorate of Law (LL.D.) by the University of Glasgow. In May 1917 he was created Baron Atholstan, of Huntingdon in the Province of Quebec in the Dominion of Canada and of the City of Edinburgh, by King George V. This granting of a peerage title to Graham was the final impetus for the drafting of the Nickle Resolution, which requested the Sovereign to cease granting knighthoods and peerage titles to Canadian subjects.

On August 9, 1917, Lord Atholstan's country residence was dynamited by radicals opposed to Canada's military conscription—an issue that Graham supported.

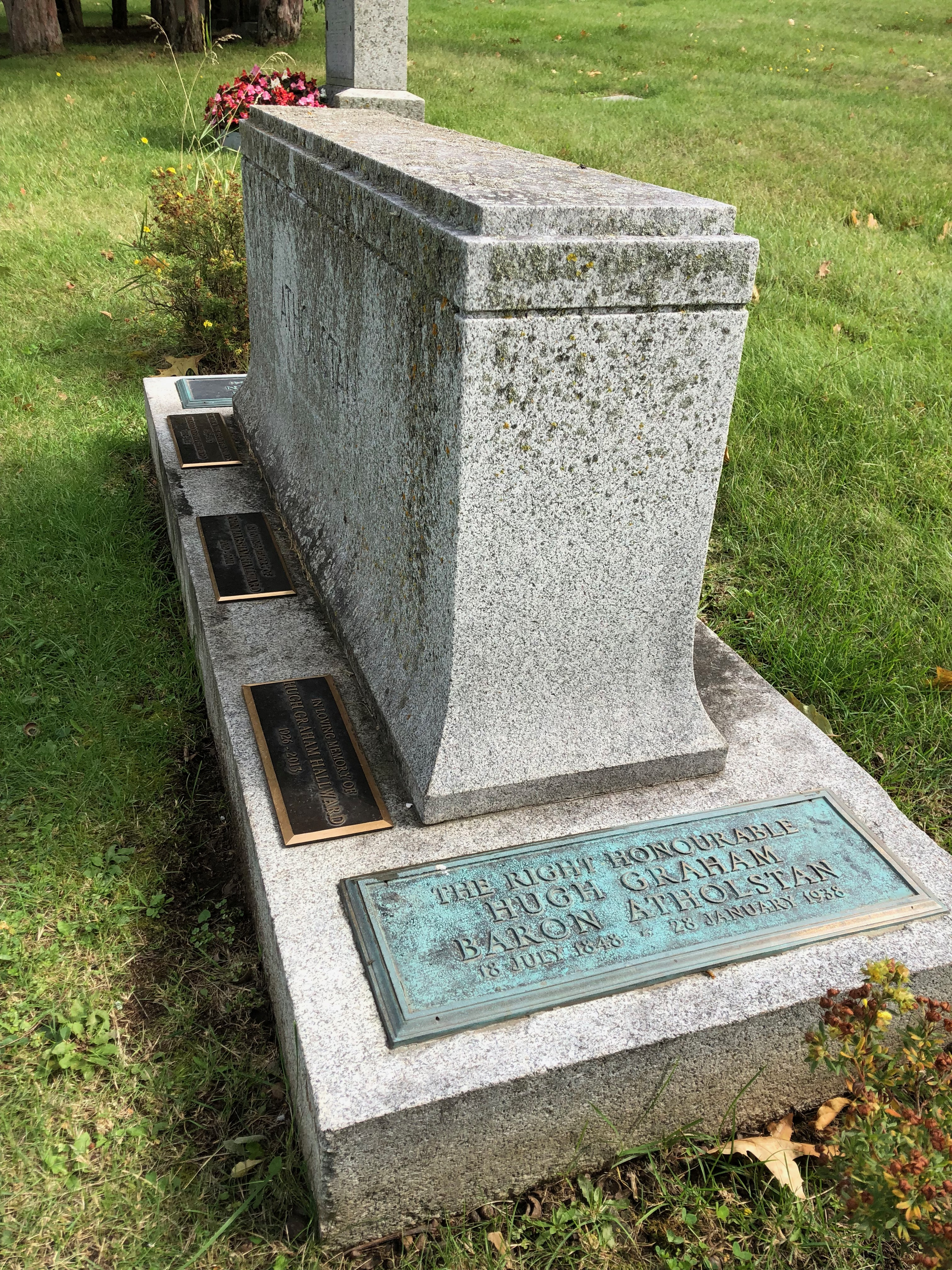
Lord Atholstan's funeral monument in Mount Royal Cemetery, Montreal.

In 1925, the 77-year-old Lord Atholstan sold his publications to John W. McConnell. In 1936, he donated the Atholstan Trophy, emblematic of cricket supremacy in eastern Canada, and in 1924 the Atholstan Trophy to the Canadian Football (Soccer) Association. Eventually this trophy was awarded to the champions of the National Soccer League of Canada from 1926 to 1941 and then from 1947 to 1950, when it was retired.

He died on January 28, 1938.

== Personal life ==
Graham married Annie Beekman Hamilton in 1892, with whom he had a daughter, Alice Hamilton Graham. Because he had no male issue, on his death in 1938 the Barony of Atholstan became extinct. His home in Montreal's Golden Square Mile on Sherbrooke Street was incorporated into the Maison Alcan complex in 1983. He is interred with his wife in the Mount Royal Cemetery in Montreal.

== Arms ==
Coat of arms of Hugh Graham, 1st Baron Atholstan
Adopted 1920 Coronet Coronet of a baron Crest An escallop Gules environed by two branches of maple proper Escutcheon Argent on a pale Sable between two thistles Azure an estoile between two maple leaves Or Supporters Dexter a moose sinister a beaver each proper and charged on the shoulder with three escallops two and one Gules Motto ONWARD Badge On an oval Vert a garb enfiling an ancient crown Or

== See also ==
- Canadian Hereditary Peers
- Maison Alcan
- Golden Square Mile

Peerage of the United Kingdom
New creation	Baron Atholstan; 1917–1938	Extinct
