= Legislative Building of Nunavut =

- ᓄᓇᕗᒻᒥ ᒪᓕᒐᓕᐅᕐᕕᒃ
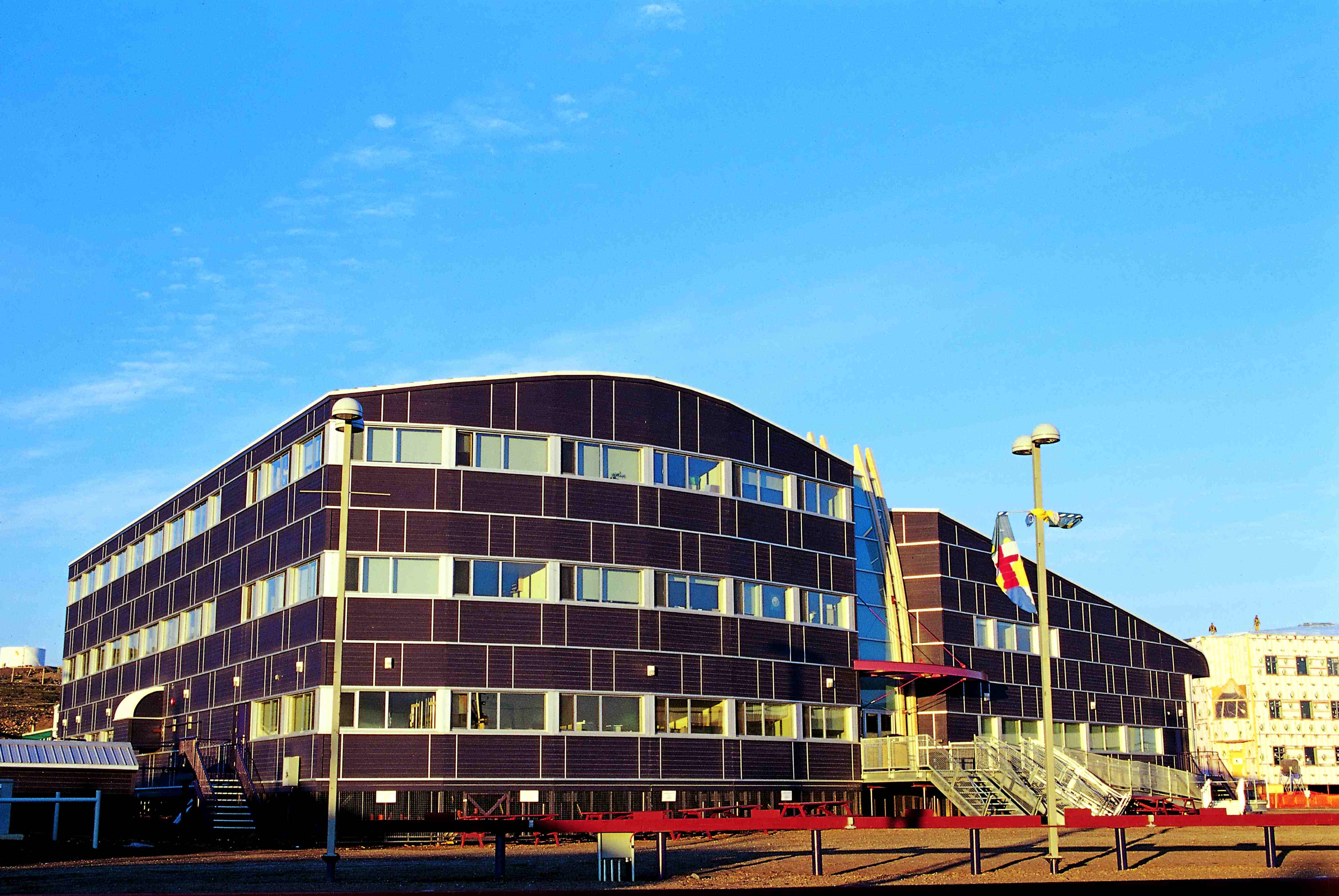
- Interactive map of the Legislative Building of Nunavut area

General information
- Status: Completed
- Type: Legislative building
- Location: 926 Federal Road, Iqaluit, Nunavut, Canada
- Coordinates: 63°45′01″N 068°31′23″W
- Current tenants: Legislative Assembly of Nunavut
- Construction started: May 1998
- Completed: 1999
- Inaugurated: October 19, 1999
- Cost: CA$12,000,000 ($21.2 million in 2025 dollars)
- Owner: NCC Investment Group

Design and construction
- Architecture firm: Arcop, Full Circle
- Engineer: A.D. Williams Engineering

The Legislative Building of Nunavut (ᓄᓇᕗᒻᒥ ᒪᓕᒐᓕᐅᕐᕕᒃ) is a structure in Iqaluit, Nunavut, Canada that serves as the seat of the Legislative Assembly of Nunavut. Designated Building 926, it consists of a three-storey glass and wood structure with a two-storey assembly hall.

== Construction ==
The Nunavut Construction Corporation (now NCC Investment Group) was selected to design, build and operate the legislative building. NCC contracted the Montreal architecture firm Arcop to design the building and the design was first presented to the public in December 1997. Construction began in May 1998 and completed in September 1999, with the building officially opened in a ceremony on October 19, 1999.

NCC Investment Group continues to own and operate the building, which is leased to the territorial government.

== Design ==
The post-modern building also incorporates the Inuktituk concept of meeting place or "Qaggiq".

The lobby of the building opens to a two-storey atrium. The mace of the Legislature is stored outside the assembly hall. Ground floor houses the offices of the MLAs and Speaker, whereas the Legislative staff, Office of the Premier and executive staff are located on the second floor.

The Legislature's library is on the third floor.

Remaining government departments are housed at Building 1088, Noble House.

== Other government buildings ==
A list of other government buildings around Iqaluit:

- Nunavut Justice Centre – a two-storey, 242.8-square-metre (2,613 sq ft) building of steel, glass and concrete; home to the Nunavut Department of Justice and court house; completed in 2006 and located next to the Nunavut Arctic College and City of Iqaluit Town Hall
- Government of Canada Buildings – located across the street from the Legislature
- W.G. Brown Building/Astro Hill Complex – mixed development with commercial and government offices (Liquor Licenses, Income Support, Informatics Planning & Service, Capital Planning, Procurements & Contract Service, Legal Registries)
