= Tetra Tech =

US-based consulting and engineering services firm

Tetra Tech, Inc.
- Type: Public
- Traded as: Nasdaq: TTEK; S&P 400 component
- Industry: Professional services
- Founded: 1966; 60 years ago
- Headquarters: Pasadena, California, U.S.
- Number of locations: 550
- Area served: Worldwide
- Revenue: ▲US$5.4 billion (2025)
- Net income: ▼US$248 million (2025)
- Number of employees: 28,000 (October 2024)
- Website: tetratech.com

Tetra Tech, Inc. is an American consulting and engineering services firm based in Pasadena, California. The company provides consulting, engineering, program management, and construction management services in the areas of water, environment, infrastructure, resource management, energy, and international development.

== History ==
Tetra Tech, Inc. was founded in 1966 as the Water Management Group of Tetra Tech Inc., by Nicholas Boratynski, Henri Hodara, Bernard LeMéhauté, and Don Stern.

During its early years, the company designed waterway structures at harbors, ports, and marinas; supported water quality control projects; supported oil and gas exploration projects; and calculated the effects of offshore military activities for the Department of Defense.

In 1977, Tetra Tech offered common stock on the American Stock Exchange and used this capital to expand its services, from developing methods to predict the level and frequency of floods and causes of acid rain to environmental impact studies of gas pipeline construction and installing Hydro Products equipment for the United States Navy. By 1979, Tetra Tech was helping to analyze data used in exploring the Alaska North Slope for oil.

In 1982, Honeywell purchased Tetra Tech's U.S. operations and another group acquired Tetra Tech International. The company phased out gas exploration and related products and phased in data systems.

In 1988, Honeywell sold Tetra Tech's engineering division to a group of company employees. Dr. Li-San Hwang joined the company in 1967 and led the new independent Tetra Tech. Honeywell retained the data systems division and a Tetra Tech co-founder to head it. After its split from Honeywell, the company grew from 300 employees to more than 14,000 by December 2014.

In 1991, Tetra Tech issued 1.4 million shares of stock on the Nasdaq exchange. The cash infusion permitted more acquisitions of engineering firms specializing in water resources (urban drainage and flood control), civil engineering (bridges and waterway design), environmental restoration, and hazardous waste cleanup. Gross revenues totaled $96.5 million by 1994.

In 2005, Dr. Hwang retired, and Dan Batrack, who joined Tetra Tech in the early 1980s, became CEO.

In 2016, Tetra Tech commemorated its 50th anniversary. As part of the Company's anniversary it launched the Global Clean Water Fund grant program in partnership with Engineers Without Borders. Tetra Tech donated $50,000 to 6 projects around the world that provided clean, safe water for communities in need. Tetra Tech also celebrated 25 years as a publicly traded company on the Nasdaq exchange in December 2016.

== Acquisitions ==
The remainder of the decade to 2014 involved growth by acquiring firms in Canada, Australia, and South America in its core (water and infrastructure) and new markets (mining and energy). Tetra Tech also acquired firms that provided international development services to the United States Agency for International Development. These new acquisitions focused on implementing sustainable strategies for water, energy, and the environment in Africa, Asia, and South America and facilitating stability and growth in countries in the aftermath of social conflicts or failed governing institutions. In October 2015, Coffey International was purchased.

Tetra Tech acquired Glumac in October 2017.

In January 2018, Tetra Tech acquired Bridgenet. In the same month, Norman Disney & Young was purchased.

Tetra Tech acquired the UK-based professional consultancy firm White Young Green in 2019, with WYG rebranding as Tetra Tech two years later.

In February 2021 Tetra Tech acquired Coanda Research and Development Corporation, a Canadian engineering consulting company specializing in computational fluid dynamics, physical and predictive modeling, data analytics, process engineering, analytical chemistry, and instrument development.

In April 2021 Tetra Tech acquired IBRA-RMAC Automation Systems, Inc., a California based water systems instrumentation and digital transformation consulting services for water infrastructure.

In May 2021 Tetra Tech announced that The Kaizen Company had joined its international development practice.

In July 2021 Tetra Tech acquired UK-based Hoare Lea, a sustainable engineering design firm.

In October 2021 Tetra Tech acquired Enterprise Automation (EA), a California based automation and digital transformation consultancy with services including control systems integration, advanced data analytics, platform virtualization, and OT/IT cybersecurity.

In February 2024 Tetra Tech announced the acquisition of LS Technologies, a Fairfax Virginia based contracting firm.

In April 2022, Tetra announced the approval of a patent for its proprietary Volans, a 3D animation and visualization software. In July 2022, Tetra acquired The Integration Group of Americas (TIGA), a systems integration and engineering services company.

In September 2022 Tetra Tech made a successful takeover offer for UK-based RPS Group.

Tetra Tech completed its largest-ever acquisition in January 2023, with its $691 million purchase of the British environmental consulting firm RPS Group. That same month, the company acquired Amyx, Inc., a cybersecurity and technology firm based in Reston, Virginia.

In March 2024, the company acquired LS Technologies, a consulting firm in Fairfax, Virginia. Later that year, in May, Tetra Tech purchased Convergence Controls & Engineering.

== Operations ==
Headquartered in Pasadena, California, Tetra Tech has 30,000 employees in 550 offices worldwide. Its clients include a diverse base of international, U.S. state and local government, U.S. federal government, U.S. commercial, and international clients. No single client, except for U.S. federal government clients, accounted for more than 10 percent of the company's revenue in fiscal 2017.

The company is organized in two business groups: Government Services Group (GSG) and Commercial/International Services Group (CIG).

== Soil sample controversy ==
In 2016, Tetra Tech was accused of faking soil sample results in San Francisco, California, after the U.S. Navy identified 386 “anomalous” soil sample results out of the more than 25,000 taken at Hunters Point Naval Shipyard over the past 20 years. In April 2018, U.S. Environmental Protection Agency comments, released by Public Employees for Environmental Responsibility (PEER), suggested that between 90 and 97 percent of the soil sample results were "neither reliable nor defensible." Also in April, Tetra Tech responded that both conclusions were inaccurate and offered to pay for independent re-testing. Tetra Tech CEO Dan Batrack said, “We believe that any concerns can be directly addressed by actually re-testing and analyzing the areas in question.”

In May 2018, two former supervisors involved in the cleanup of radioactive contaminants at the old Hunters Point Naval Shipyard pleaded guilty to falsifying soil sample results. In January 2019, the U.S. Justice Department sued Tetra Tech, accusing the engineering company of submitting false billing claims to the U.S. Navy that were based on falsified soil and building test data.

In July 2019, the San Francisco Office of Community Investment and Infrastructure Commission approved initial plans for the construction of more homes at Hunters Point Naval Shipyard, citing the California Department of Public Health’s certification that the area is clean and safe for residents.
