= RPS Group =

Global professional services firm

RPS Group Limited
- Formerly: Rural Planning Services
- Company type: Limited company
- Industry: Environmental consulting, Upstream Oil and Gas and Renewable Energy consulting
- Founded: 1970
- Headquarters: Abingdon-on-Thames, England
- Key people: Ken Lever (Chairman); John Douglas (CEO)
- Revenue: ▲£560.4 million (2021)
- Operating income: ▲£28.3 million (2021)
- Net income: ▲£5.9 million (2021)
- Number of employees: 5,000 (2022)
- Parent: Tetra Tech, Inc.
- Website: www.rpsgroup.com

RPS Group Limited is a global professional services firm of consultants and service providers, headquartered in Abingdon-on-Thames, England. It was listed on the London Stock Exchange until it was acquired by Tetra Tech in January 2023.

== History ==
RPS was founded in 1970, as Rural Planning Services, with founder Michael Boddington as its first chief executive. It was first listed on the London Stock Exchange in 1987.

In the late 20th century, the company expanded under the leadership of a later chief executive, Alan Hearne, and in 2001 he received the Financial Times / London Stock Exchange Entrepreneur of the Year award and company was nominated in the top four for PLC of the Year in the same awards.

In 2014 RPS Group acquired CgMs Consulting, a consultant company specialising in obtaining significant planning permission in green belt areas.

In August 2022, WSP Global made a takeover offer to purchase RPS Group for £591 million. In September 2022, RPS received a counter takeover offer from Tetra Tech for £636 million with WSP opting not to increase its bid. RPS' shareholders voted to accept the Tetra Tech offer in November 2022 and it was approved by the court in January 2023.
