= Maison Alcan =

Building complex in Montreal, Canada

Coordinates: 45.5006°N 73.5772°W

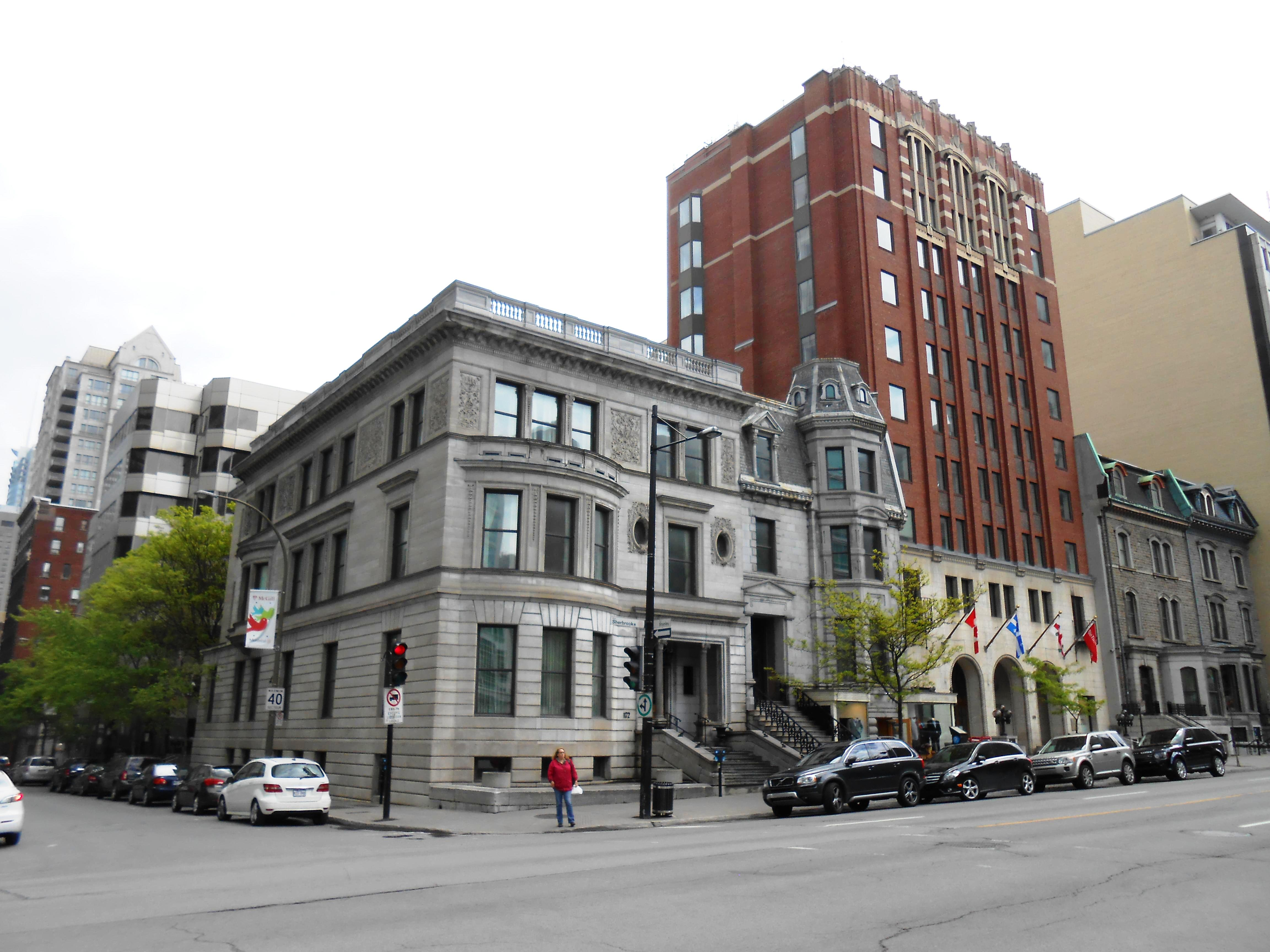
- Atholstan House, Maison Alcan complex, with Davis Building at rear and Berkeley Hotel building at right
- Interactive map of the Maison Alcan area

General information
- Location: 1188 Sherbrooke Street West, Montreal, Canada
- Completed: 1983
- Client: Lune Rouge
- Owner: Guy Laliberté

Technical details
- Floor area: 270,000 sq ft (25,000 m^{2})

Design and construction
- Architect: Ray Affleck
- Architecture firm: Arcop

Patrimoine culturel du Québec
- Official name: La Maison-Alcan
- Type: Classified heritage immovable
- Designated: 2017-02-23

Maison Alcan (English: Alcan House) is a building complex located on Sherbrooke Street in the Golden Square Mile district of Montreal, Canada. The complex was used to house the world headquarters for Alcan, now part of Rio Tinto Alcan, until 2015. Completed in 1983, the complex's integration of new construction with restored or renovated buildings marked a turning point in corporate Montreal's approach to development.

Maison Alcan combined restored Golden Square Mile properties — Atholstan House, the Beique, the former Berkeley Hotel, the Holland House, as well as the Salvation Army's Montreal Citadel on Drummond Street — with a new aluminum-clad structure, known as the Davis Building. The Berkeley Hotel serves as the main entrance to the complex and its atrium, on Sherbrooke Street. According to the La Presse newspaper, Maison Alcan marked the first time a major corporation based in Montreal had sought to preserve historic properties as part of a new headquarters. In contrast to the controversial demolition of the nearby Van Horne Mansion, Maison Alcan preserved part of the architectural heritage of the Golden Square Mile.

== Architects ==
Maison Alcan was designed by the Montreal-based architectural firm of Arcop (Architects in co-partnership), with Ray Affleck as lead architect. Peter Rose collaborated with Peter Lanken on the interior planning and design.

== Sale ==
In May 2011, it was reported that Rio Tinto Alcan was looking to sell Maison Alcan and move to new headquarters, due to the cost of renovating the building for a smaller workforce—and with the historic status of four of the seven buildings possibly complicating renovations. The complex was listed by real estate brokers Cushman & Wakefield, with a $30 million minimum bid.

In 2015, Alcan moved its HQ from the building and relocated to the Deloitte Tower, which is located between Windsor Station and the Bell Centre. In June 2016, Alcan sold the complex to Nacla General Partner Inc. for $48 million.

Reflector Entertainment have their multimedia studio located in the complex.

After plans to convert the site into condos and build a 30-story office tower fell through, Heritage Montreal submitted a request for the designation of Maison Alcan, which was subsequently classified as a heritage immovable by the Ministry of Culture and Communications on 23 February 2017.
