= Arcop =

Canadian architectural firm

- Formerly: Affleck, Desbarats, Lebensold, Michaud & Sise (1955-1959); Affleck, Desbarats, Dimakopoulos, Lebensold, Sise (1959-1970)
- Company type: Private
- Industry: Architecture
- Founded: 1955
- Founders: Ray Affleck; Guy Desbarats; Jean Michaud; Fred Lebensold; Hazen Sise
- Headquarters: Montreal, Quebec, Canada
- Area served: Worldwide
- Key people: Dimitri Dimakopoulos; Arthur Boyd Nichol
- Number of employees: 150+ (1966)
- Website: arcop.ca/

Arcop (also ARCOP) was an architectural firm based in Montreal, renowned for designing many major projects in Canada including Place Bonaventure, Place Ville-Marie and Maison Alcan. The firm was originally formed as a partnership under the name Affleck, Desbarats, Lebensold, Michaud & Sise between Ray Affleck, Guy Desbarats, Jean Michaud, Fred Lebensold and Hazen Sise, all graduates and/or professors at the McGill School of Architecture. In 1959, after the departure of Michaud and the addition of Dimitri Dimakopoulos, another McGill Architecture graduate, the firm was renamed Affleck, Desbarats, Dimakopoulos, Lebensold, Sise which it maintained for a decade afterward. The company did not adopt the name Arcop, which stands for "Architects in Co-Partnership", until 1970.

The concept of the firm was to pool together knowledge from multiple individual architects and was based upon the principles of The Architects' Collaborative, founded in 1945 by eight architects in Cambridge, Massachusetts, including Walter Gropius. During the 1960s, Arcop was the largest architecture firm in Canada and at its peak in 1966, it employed over 150 people.

In 1970, Ray Affleck, Fred Lebensold and Arthur Boyd Nichol, an associate at the firm for over a decade, founded Arcop Associates, which continued to thrive for decades later until 2014, when the firm merged with five other architecture firms to form one national firm, Architecture49.

== History ==
Arcop began as the architectural office of Affleck, Desbarats, Lebensold, Hasen & Sise in Montreal, Quebec in 1953 when a partnership was formed between three graduates from the School of Architecture at McGill University, Ray Affleck, Guy Desbarats and Jean Michaud, and two McGill architecture professors, Fred Lebensold and Hazen Sise, who joined in 1954.

The earliest examples of projects from the firm's founding members include the Post Office in Town of Mount Royal by Affleck and Michaud from 1953–1955, Pre-cut Housing for Beaugrand-Champagne in Montreal by Affleck, Michaud and Desbarats in 1954 and the Beaver Lake Pavilion on Mount Royal in Montreal by Sise and Desbarats from 1955–1958. The first project that all members of the firm worked on together was an entry for a national competition to design the Vancouver Civic Auditorium in 1954, for which they won first place. This building was subsequently known as the Queen Elizabeth Theatre in Vancouver and was constructed from 1958–1962.

In 1954, Dimitri Dimakopoulos (1929–1995), another McGill School of Architecture graduate, joined the firm, and after becoming a full partner three years later, the architects consolidated as Affleck, Desbarats, Dimakopoulos, Lebensold, Michaud & Sise, and in 1959, with the departure of Jean Michaud, the firm became Affleck, Desbarats, Dimakopoulos, Lebensold, Sise and remained so for a full decade.

In 1959, Eva Vecsei, who would later become one of the most prominent female architects in Canada, joined the firm and continued to work there until 1971, when she left to join Dimitri Dimakopoulos' practice and in 1973, opened her own practice, Eva H. Vecsei Architect, in Montreal.

The firm's prospectus around 1960 stated "The aim was to establish an organization that could carry out large and complex building projects; maintain a high level professional and technical competence; and above all develop to the utmost the social and aesthetic values that represent the highest contribution of architecture to our civilization". At this point, the firm had approximately 70 employees and was the largest architecture firm in Canada. Major projects in Montreal included Place Ville-Marie, where the firm partnered with I.M. Pei from 1958–1964 as well as Place des Arts from 1962–1965. Other major buildings followed, including Place Bonaventure (1964–1968), two Theme Pavilions for Expo 67 (1964–1967) and the National Arts Centre in Ottawa (1965–1968).

During this period the firm also designed churches, government buildings, exhibition pavilions, residential and cultural buildings, commercial and industrial buildings and educational buildings including the Georges-Vanier Library for Loyola College (now Concordia University) (1962–1964) and the Stephen Leacock Building (1962–1964) and University Centre (Student Union Centre) (1963–1966) at McGill University.

In 1968, Hazen Sise retired, Guy Desbarats departed and Dimitri Dimakopoulos left to open his own office, and in 1970, Ray Affleck, Fred Lebensold and Arthur Boyd Nichol (who had been an associate in the firm since 1956) founded Arcop Associates.

The firm continued to design many buildings in Canada and other countries, such as Le Centre Sheraton Hotel in Montreal in 1982, the Maison Alcan in Montreal in 1983 and the Legislative Building of Nunavut in Iqaluit, Nunavut in 1998–99. They also undertook the transformation of the Palais des civilisations (formerly the French pavilion of Expo 67) into the Montreal Casino in 1993.

In 2011, Senior architect Robert La Pierre was recognized by his peers of the RAIC and introduce into the Royal College of Fellow.

In 2011, Arcop and Montreal-based engineering consulting firm Genivar announced a strategic alliance.

In 2014, Arcop merged with five other architecture firms, namely AE Consultants, North 46, PBK, Smith Carter and WHW Architects to form one national firm, Architecture49.

== Buildings ==
- Beaver Lake Pavilion, Montreal, QC, 1958
- Confederation Centre of the Arts, Charlottetown, PEI, 1964
- Le Centre Sheraton Hotel, Montreal, QC, 1982
- Legislative Building of Nunavut, Iqaluit, NU (with Full Circle Architecture), 1998–99
- Les Cours Mont-Royal (renovation), Montreal, QC, 1989
- Life Sciences Centre, Dalhousie University, Halifax, NS, 1971
- Maison Alcan, Montreal, QC, 1983
- Mughal Sheraton Hotel, Agra, India, 1978
- Maison Théâtre, Montreal, QC, 1982
- Man the Explorer and Man the Producer Theme Pavilions at Expo 67, Montreal, QC, 1967
- Montreal Casino, Montreal, QC, 1993
- National Arts Centre, Ottawa, ON, 1965
- Place Air Canada, Montreal, QC, 1983
- Place Bonaventure, Montreal, QC, 1964–1967
- Place Ville-Marie, Montreal, QC (with I. M. Pei & Partners), 1958–1964
- Quebecor Building, Tour II, Montreal, QC, 2008
- Queen Elizabeth Theatre, Vancouver, BC, 1959
- Place des Arts (Salle Wilfrid-Pelletier), Montreal, QC, 1963
- Stephen Leacock Building, McGill University, Montreal, QC, 1962–1965
- St. John's Arts and Culture Centre, St. John's, NL, 1967
- University Centre, McGill University, Montreal, 1962–1965
- World Trade Centre Montreal, Montreal, QC, 1992

== Gallery ==
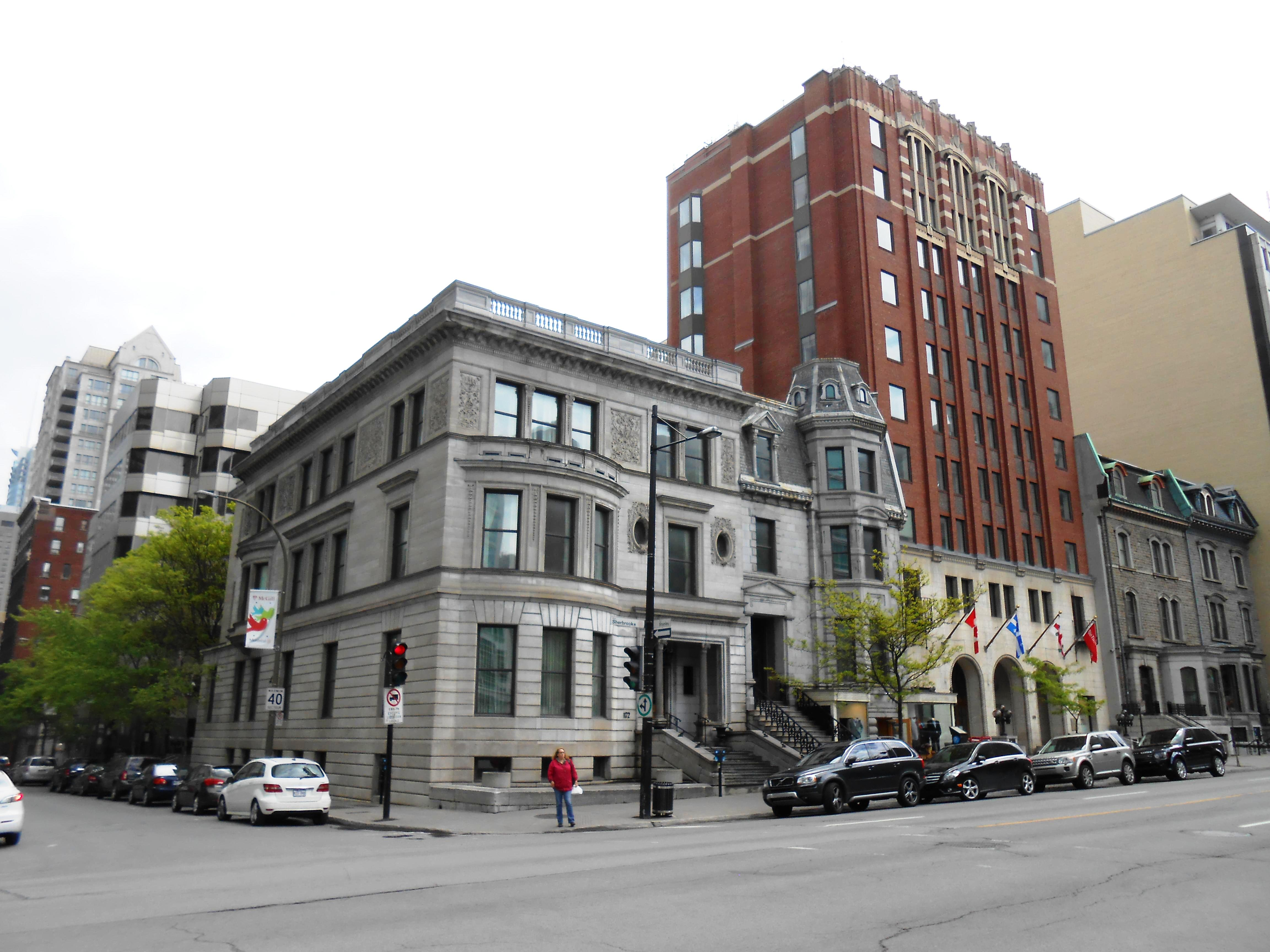
Maison Alcan (1983), Montreal, Quebec

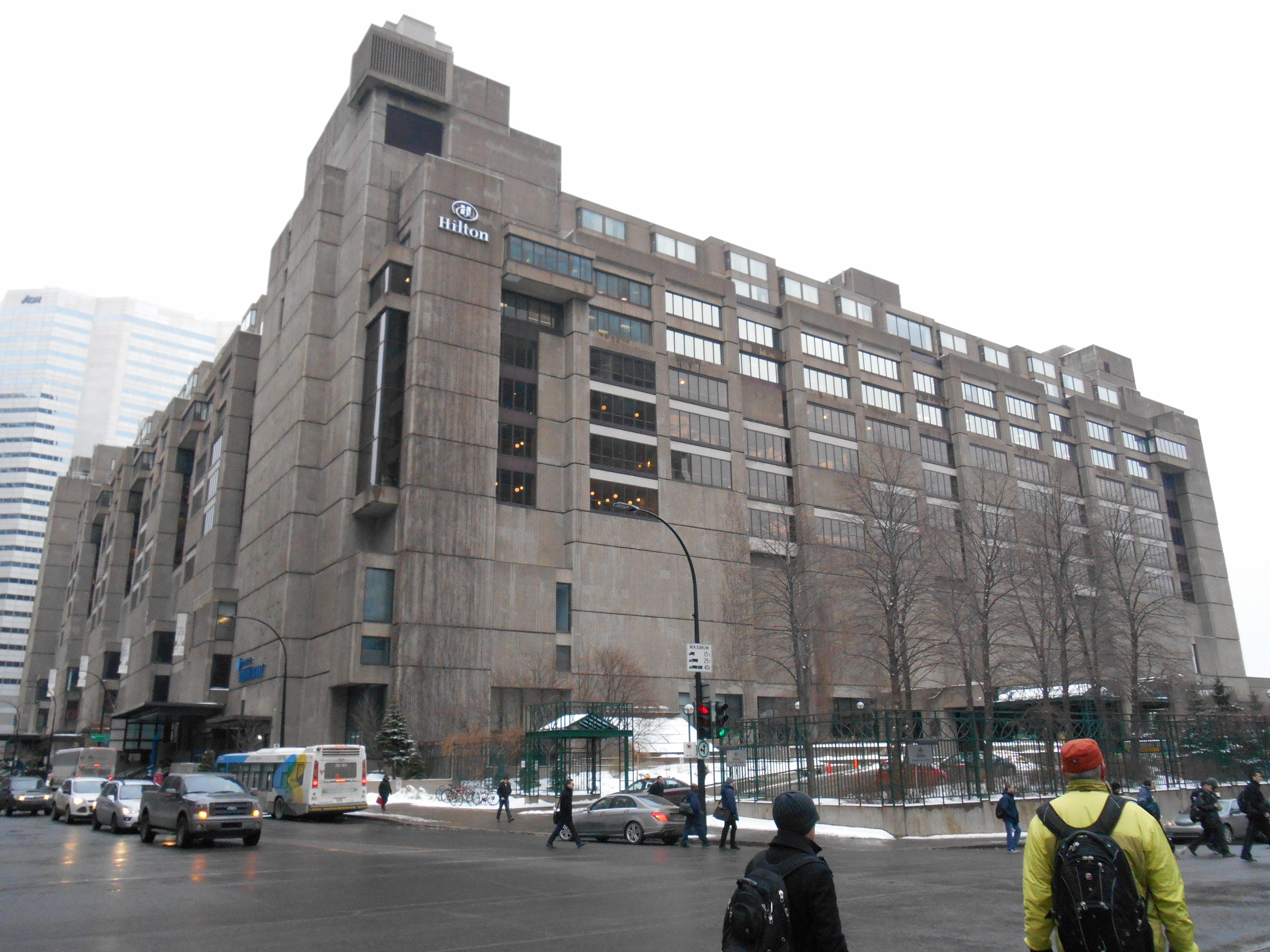
Place Bonaventure (1964–67), Montreal, Quebec

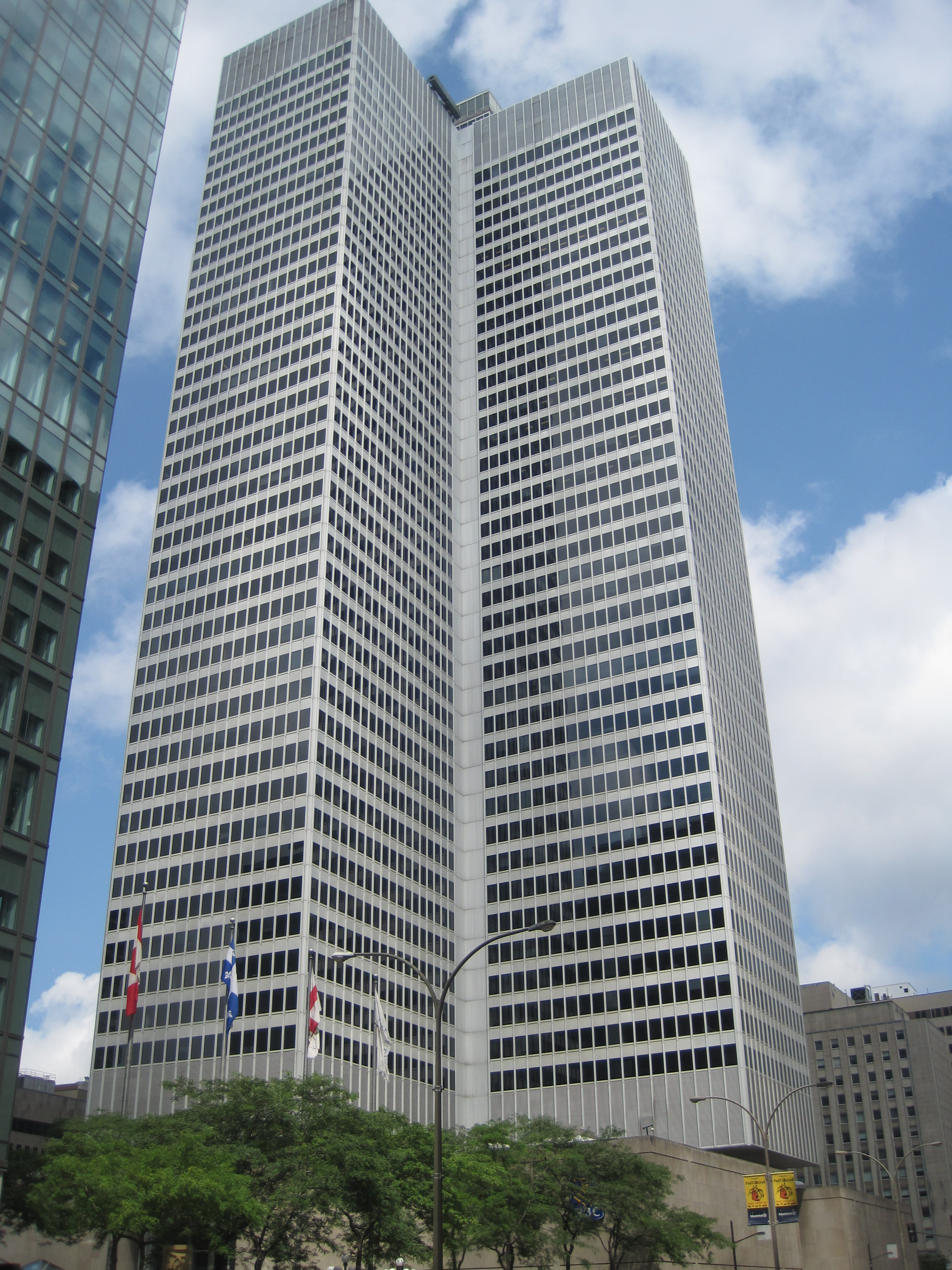
Place Ville-Marie (1958–62), Montreal, Quebec

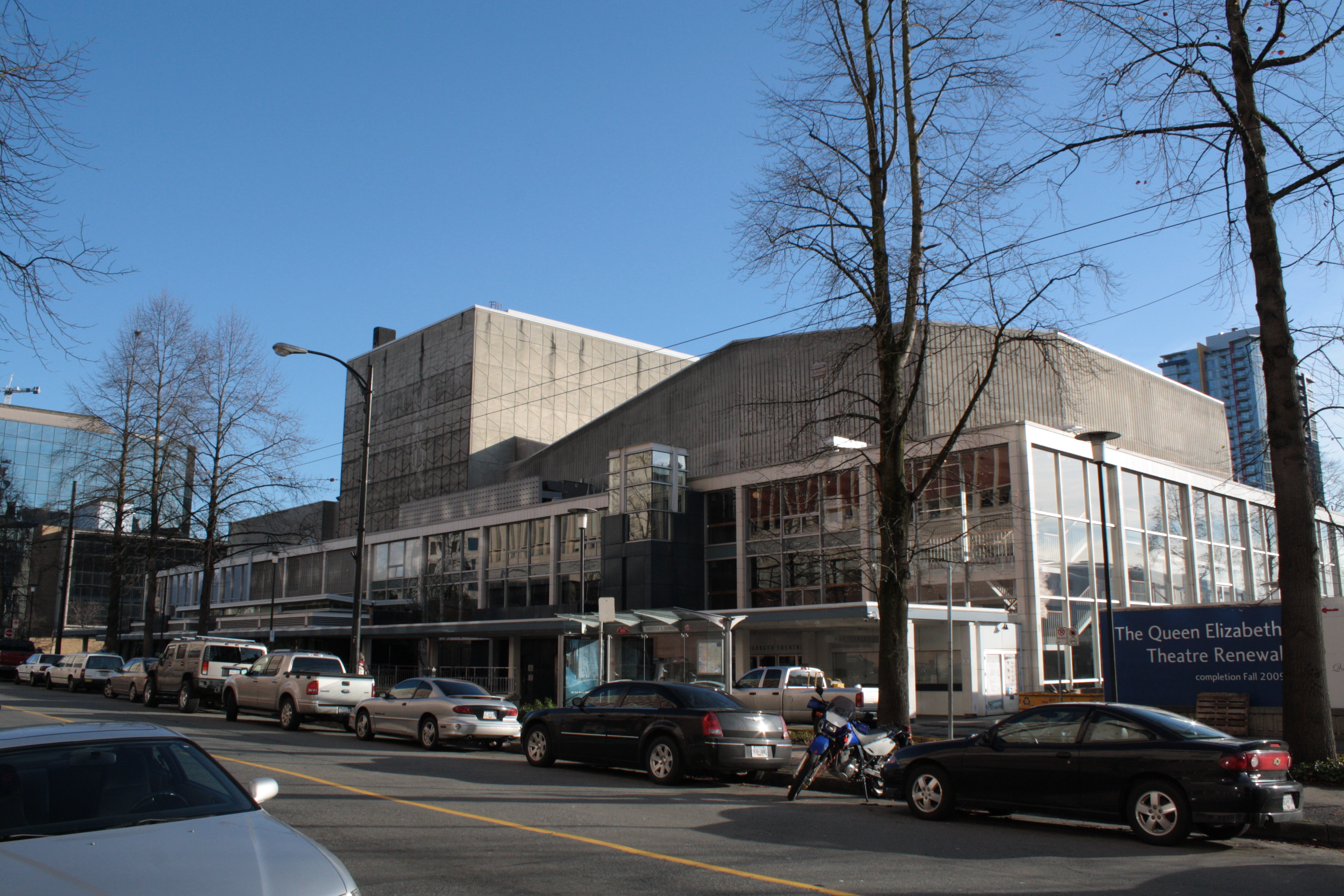
Queen Elizabeth Theatre (1958–62), Vancouver, British Columbia

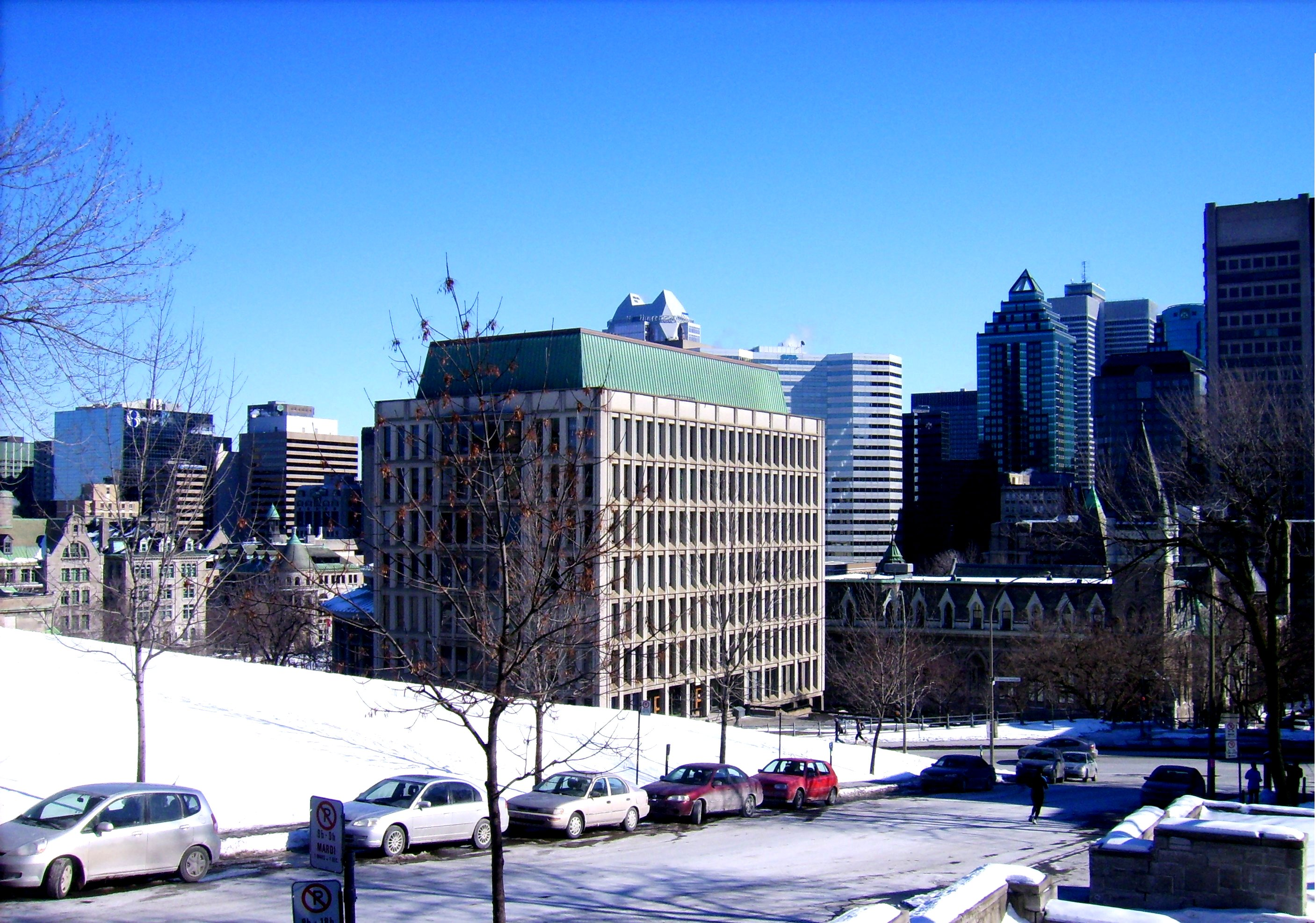
Stephen Leacock Building (1962–65), McGill University, Montreal, Quebec

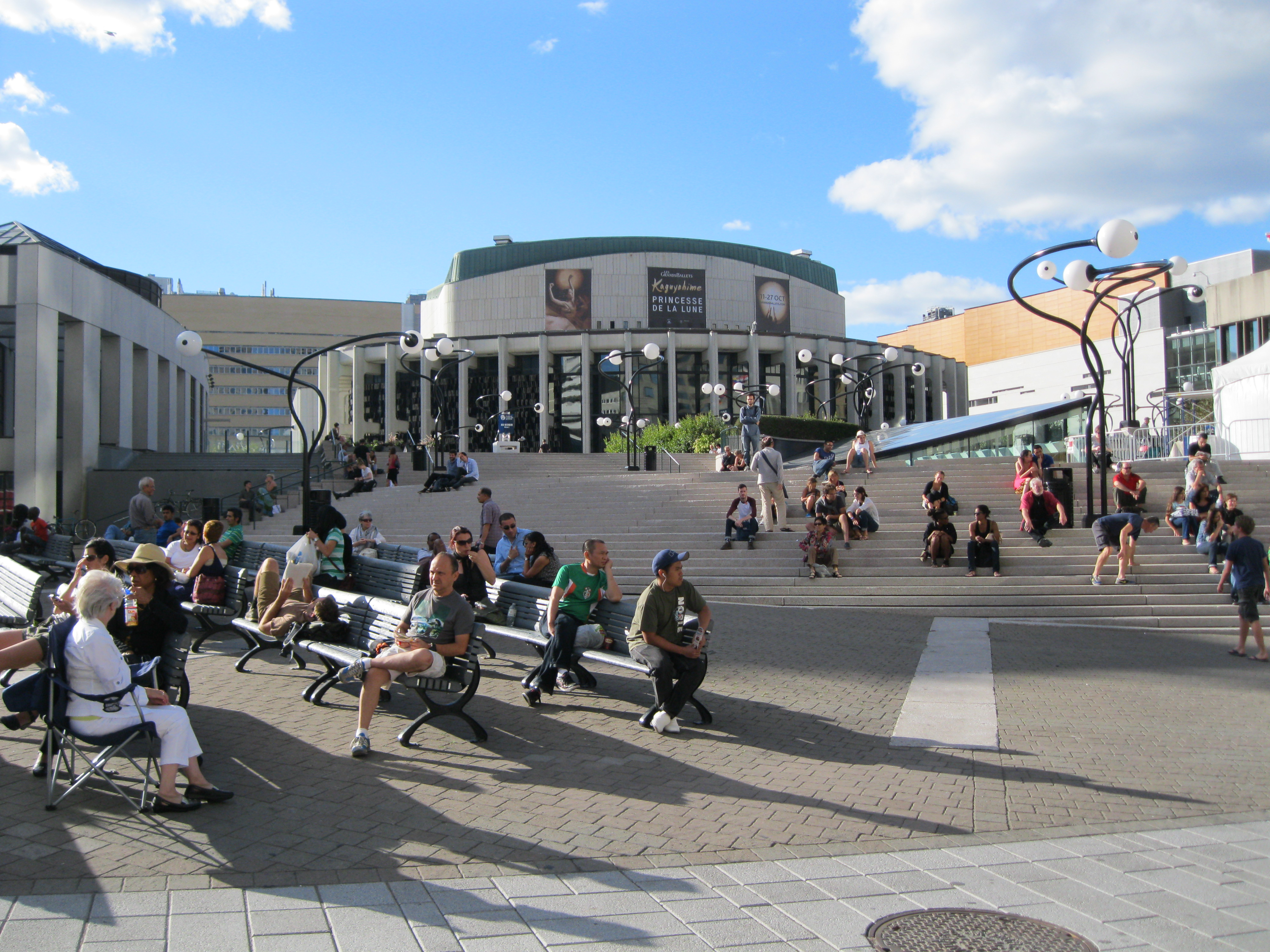
Place des Arts (Salle Wilfrid-Pelletier) (1963), Montreal, Quebec

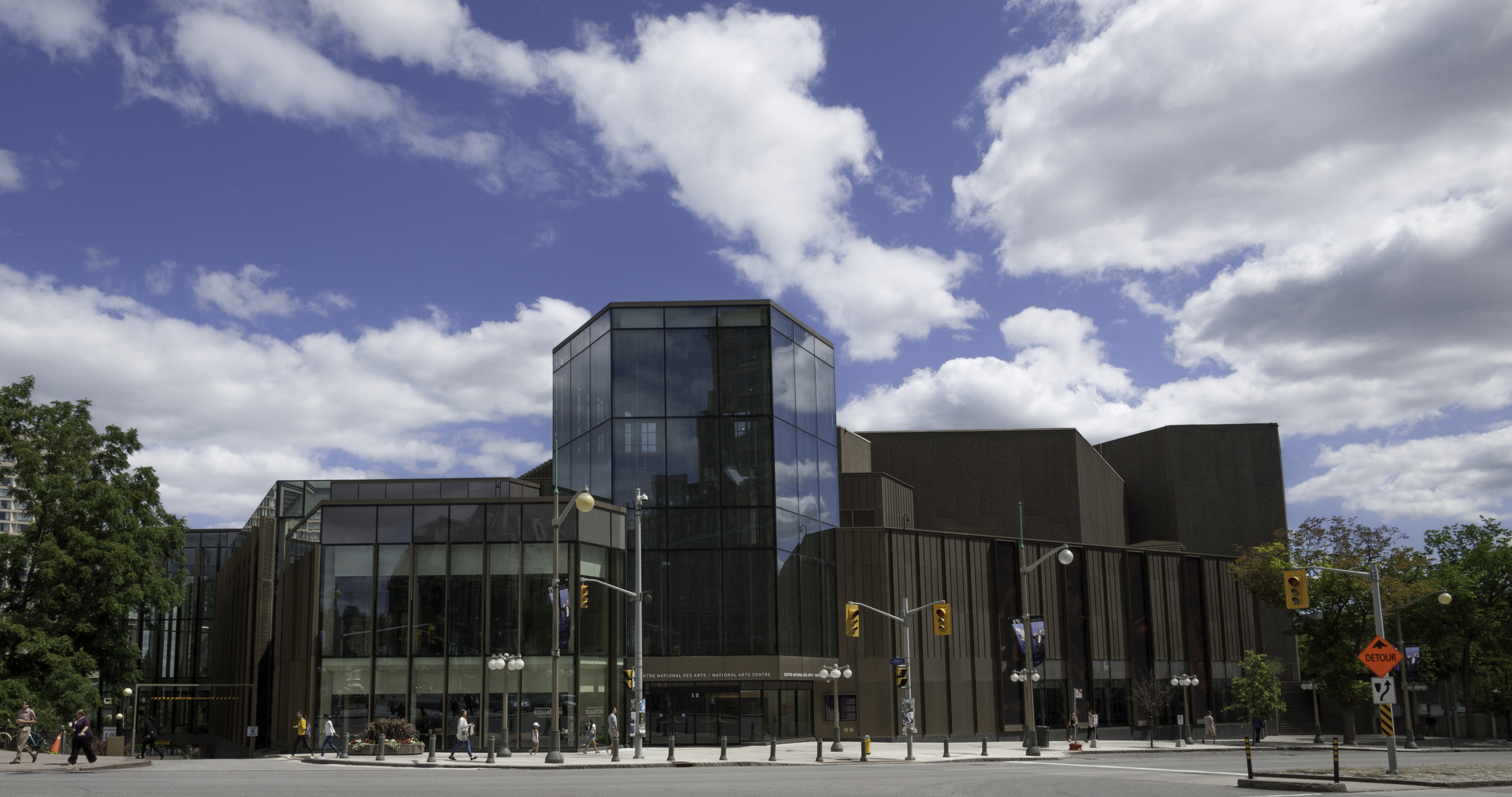
National Arts Centre (1965), Ottawa, Ontario

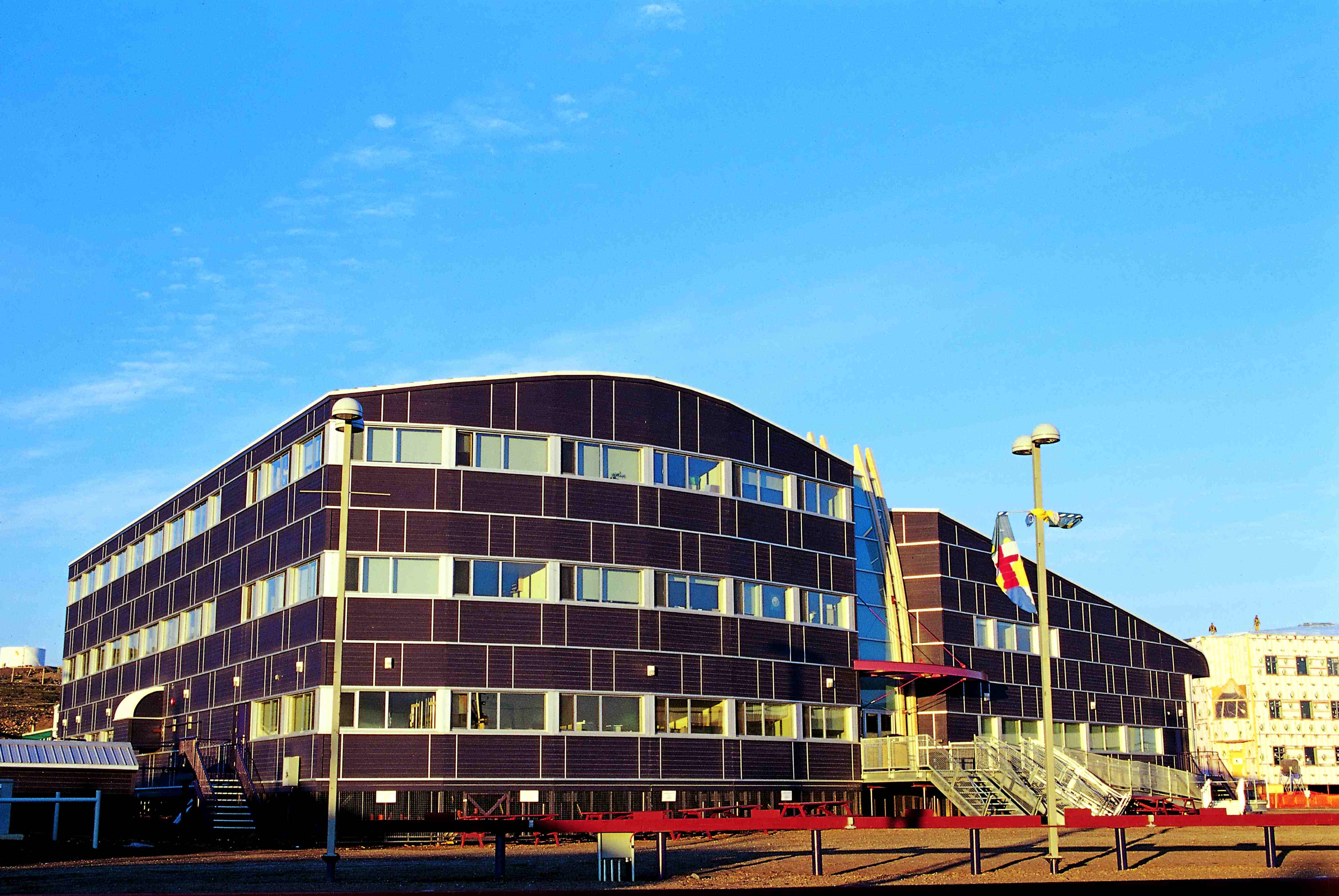
Legislative Building of Nunavut, Iqaluit, Nunavut (1989–99)

== See also ==
- Peter Guo-hua Fu School of Architecture
- Gavin Affleck
