= CESM Soccer Center =

Facility in Montreal, Quebec, Canada

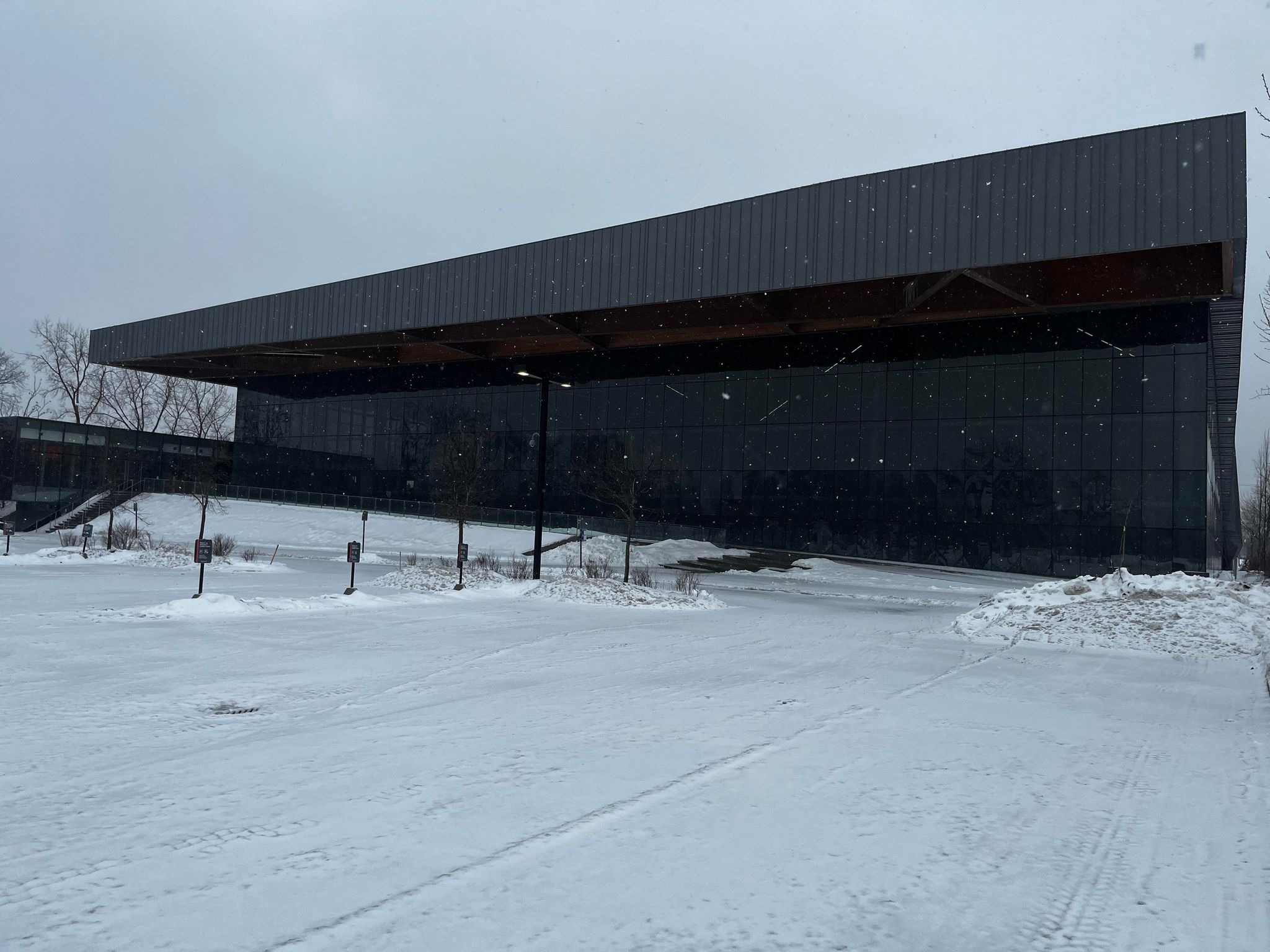
- Exterior Facade from the East Side of the Complex

- Location in Montreal
- Address: 9235 Papineau Avenue
- Location: Montreal, Quebec
- Coordinates: 45°33′44″N 73°38′17″W
- Owner: City of Montreal
- Capacity: 750
- Surface: Synthetic
- Parking: 170 spaces

Construction
- Opened: 2015
- Architects: Saucier + Perrotte; HCMA Architecture + Design

Situated in the city of Montreal, Quebec, Canada, the CESM Soccer Center is a dedicated enclosed facility primarily designed for soccer activities which officially opened in 2015.

Designed by Saucier+Perrotte Architectes in collaboration with HCMA Architecture+Design, the center offers expansive indoor spaces accommodating multiple soccer fields on an annual basis. Additionally, the project encompasses an outdoor soccer area for use during favorable weather conditions. The architectural design of the building aims to pay homage to the historical land usage upon which the center stands.

== Context ==
In 2011, the city of Montreal organized a two-stage competition. The program of the event outlined three primary challenges for the prospective stadium: addressing architectural expression, the structural challenge of an unobstructed span over the playing field and adhering to the principles of sustainable, sport-oriented architecture integrated into the CESM park with the gold LEED certification. Initially, 30 proposals were forwarded and 4 firms were selected by the jury to advance to the second stage: Saucier + Perrotte Architectes, Hughes Condon Marler Architectes, Éric Pelletier/GLCRM, Côté Leahy Cardas/Provencher Roy Associés Architectes, and Affleck de la Riva Architectes/Cannon Design.

Located on the former Miron quarry, in the northwest sector of the Saint-Michel Environmental Complex, the site has undergone a long history marked by transformation and development. Starting as a mining center and later serving as a landfill, the land's topography has been significantly impacted by human intervention throughout time. The decontamination of the site was one of the many challenges faced before beginning the construction phase. Following the decontamination, measures were taken to capture and remove biogas beneath the ground and to be used as fuel to ensure optimal indoor air quality when built. Additionally, mature trees along Papineau Avenue were preserved during the construction process.

== Architectural design ==
=== Exterior ===
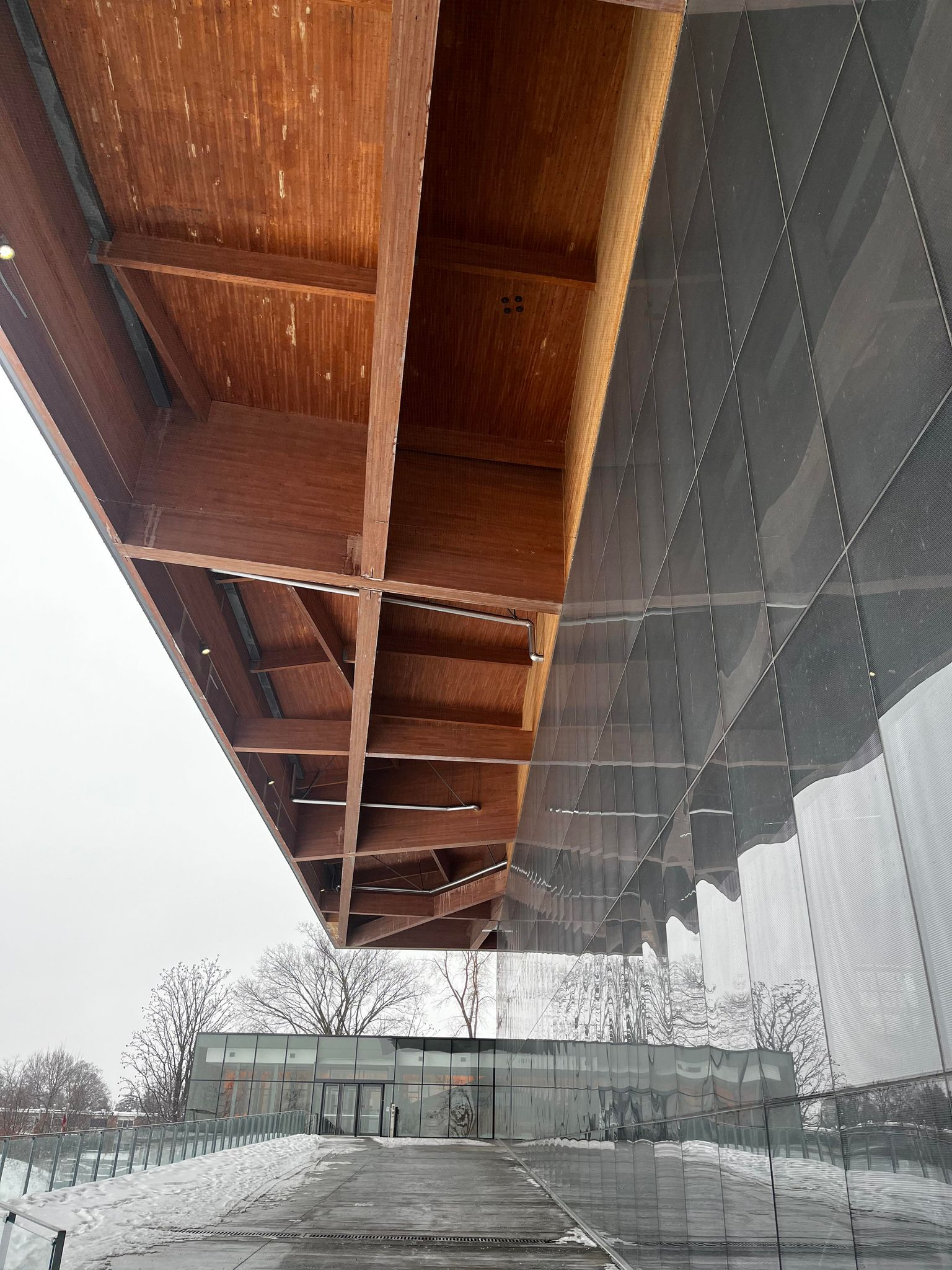
Cantilevered Roof with exposed mass-timber Structure on the Eastern Facade

The CESM Soccer Center exhibits a contemporary and functional architectural style on its exterior, encompassing elements such as the structure, materials, concept, and aesthetics. The primary objective of the design was to create a building that seamlessly integrates with the sport while recalling the geological history of the site by embodying the look of a mineral stratum. On multiple facades, the exterior features steel columns separated by glass, with the entrance area utilizing orange-tinted windows. Additionally, concrete is employed both for the building's accesses and as a flooring material for its versatile outdoor space. The majority of the exterior cladding is glass, paired with a warm-gray zinc cladding on various faces, fascia's, and the roof, all aligned with the center's conceptual framework. Emphasizing the applied materials on the flat surfaces, the front of the building has a cantilevered roof, offering a sight of the cross-laminated timber structure utilized in this section of the architecture. Having integrated a continuous roof, it extends over the entry plaza which also descends over the indoor soccer field and further lengthening to the ground to create a spectator seating area for the outdoor field.

=== Interior ===
Similar to the exterior, the interior of the building reflects a contemporary architectural style focused on both durability and ease of maintenance. Gypsum is used for common secondary wall separations, while the main exterior wall incorporates a steel column structural system reaching a maximum height of 15 meters. At the roof level, the main structure consists of glulam beams and Cross-Laminated Timber panels, bonded to form box girders with a 69-meter clear span. The architectural design specified precise box girder dimensions, with a width of 500 mm and a height of 4000 mm. For the top and bottom flanges, glulam beams were utilized and longitudinally installed Cross laminated panels were employed for the webs which consisted of angled wood members to not only provide stability to the larger ones, but also symbolically represent the trajectories of a ball in the course of a game. In connection to the structural elements, lighting fixtures are integrated to ensure efficient functionality A division is present between the pitch and the bleachers, serving as a protective barrier to prevent footballs from reaching spectators, changing rooms, or the building's reception area. This divider is constructed of wire mesh with small enough openings to avoid obstructing the vision of the people watching.

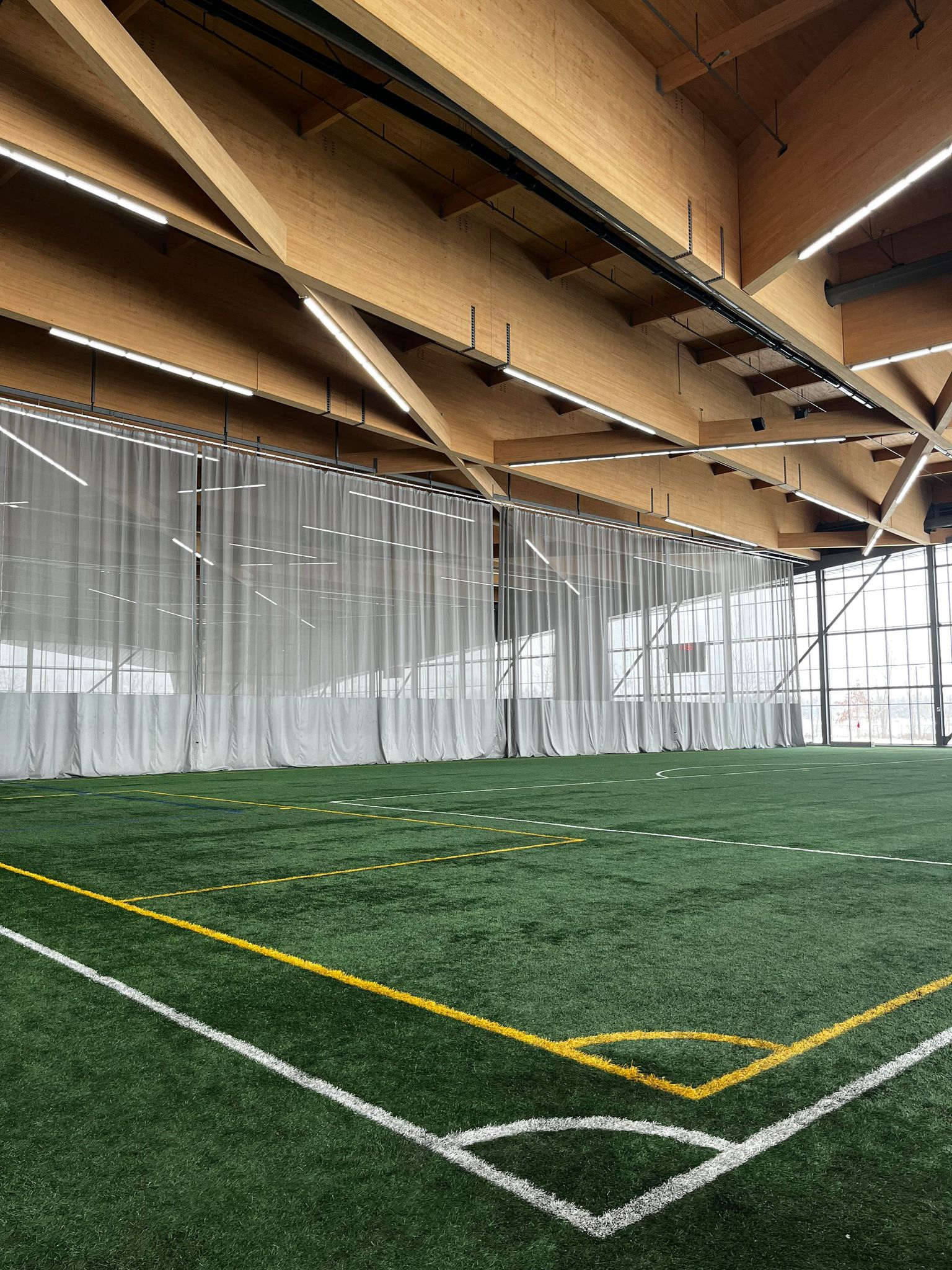
Corner view of a split indoor field under main Mass Timber Structure

=== Spatial layout ===
The building's layout is structured into two levels. The lower level accommodates an 11-player soccer field, which can be subdivided into two 9-player fields or three 7-player fields. Adjacent to the main pitch and beneath the bleachers are the changing rooms, physiotherapy areas, and fitness spaces. The higher indoor area includes the lobby, event space, bleachers with a capacity for 750 people, business offices, catering area, multi-purpose space, and bathrooms. Collectively, these areas contribute to a gross floor area of approximately 12,600 square meters. Regarding the outdoor space, the front section serves as a parking area for a total of 170 vehicles. At the rear, located between the outdoor synthetic pitch and the building, there is an adaptable space enclosed by the building's structure. This space extends to the ground on both sides of the soccer pitch and is equipped with a total of 600 seats. The layout of all spaces is designed to facilitate straightforward and efficient circulation, ensuring easy access to every area.

== Awards and distinctions ==
- Energia Award in the Category “New Building All Sectors” from the Quebec Association for Energy Management (AQME).
- Grand prix du génie québécois, Association des firmes de génie-conseil du Québec, mechanical and electrical building category, 2016
- Special Mention, Wood Design & Building, Architizer, 2016
- Design Award of Excellence, Ontario Association of Architects, 2016
- Silver Award, American Architecture Prize, Architectural Design/Recreational Architecture, 2016
- Award of Excellence, Cecobois, 2014
- P/A Progressive Architecture Award Citation, Architecture Magazine, 2014
- 2018 Governor's general medal in architecture
