= Elizabeth Wirth Music Building =

McGill University (Montreal) campus building

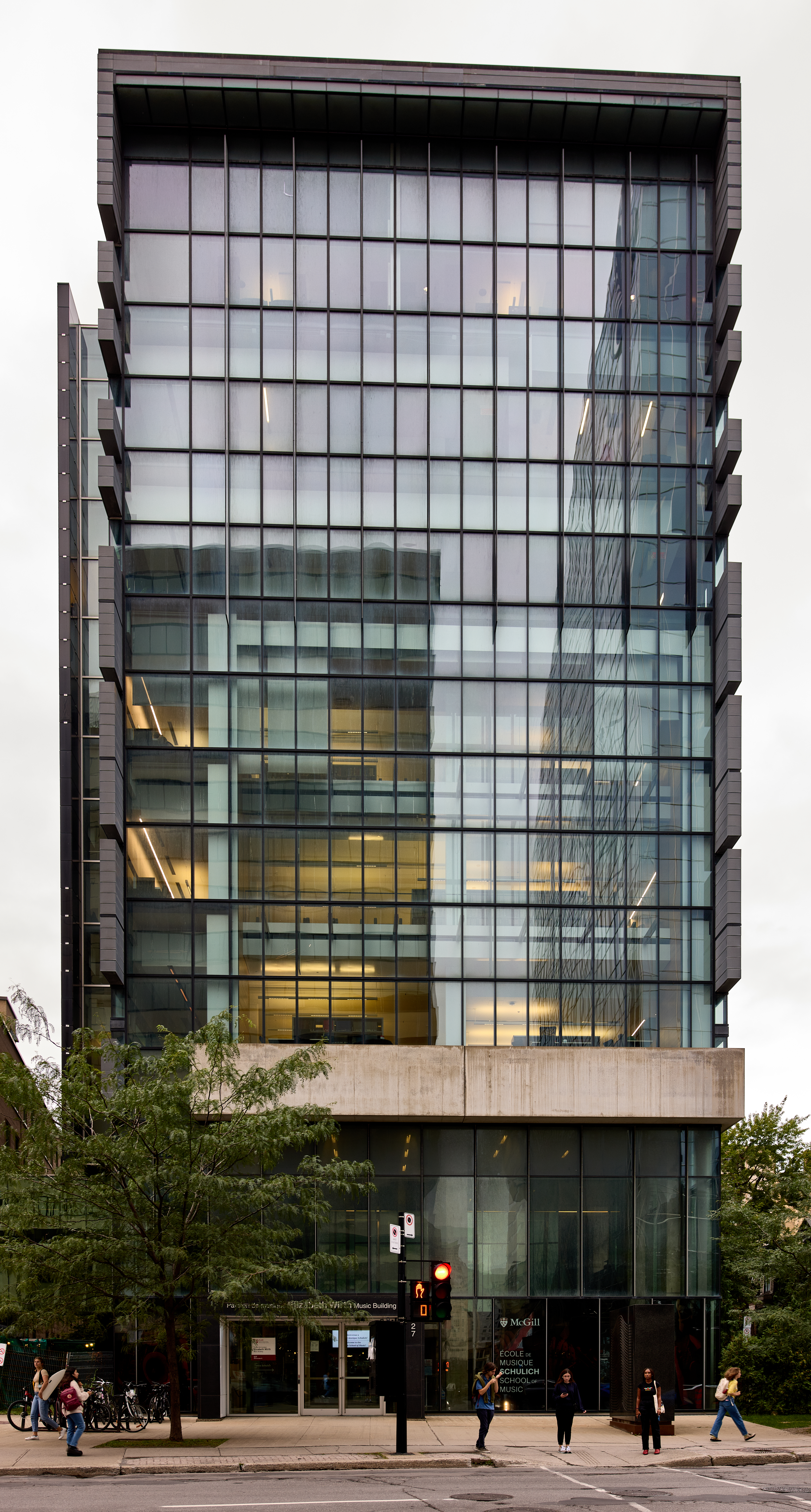
- Interactive map of the Elizabeth Wirth Music Building area
- Etymology: Elizabeth Wirth

General information
- Architectural style: Contemporary
- Location: 527 Sherbrooke Street West, Montreal, Quebec, Canada
- Coordinates: 45.50611111°N 73.57277778°W
- Completed: 2005 (general building); 2007 (research offices and recording studios)
- Opened: 2006
- Cost: C$70,000,000
- Affiliation: Schulich School of Music; McGill University

Technical details
- Material: Glass, limestone, concrete, zinc, aluminum
- Floor count: 10
- Floor area: 11,775.0 square metres (126,745 ft^{2})

Design and construction
- Architects: Gilles Saucier; Anik Shooner
- Architecture firm: Saucier + Perrotte; Menkès Shooner Dagenais
- Structural engineer: Saia Deslauriers Kadanoff Leconte Brisebois Blais
- Services engineer: Pellemon inc. / BPR
- Other designers: ARTEC (acoustics)

The Elizabeth Wirth Music Building (formerly the New Music Building) is one of two buildings belonging to the Schulich School of Music at McGill University, the other being the Strathcona Music Building directly adjacent to it. The building is located at 527 Sherbrooke Street West, on the corner of Sherbrooke and Aylmer Street in Montreal, Quebec and was designed in 2005 by the Montreal-based architectural firm Saucier + Perrotte. The building officially opened in 2006, and its construction was made possible through a donation of C$20 million from McGill alumnus Seymour Schulich to the Schulich School of Music. The building was officially inaugurated as the Elizabeth Wirth Music Building on April 30, 2015, after the School received a donation of C$7.5 million from McGill alumna Elizabeth Wirth.

The contemporary, eight-storey building is connected to the historic Strathcona Music Building by a glazed bridge that runs through the main entrance hall, and contains a multi-level lobby, recording studios, multimedia rooms, performance venues and the Marvin Duchow Music Library, which spans three floors.

== History ==
Part of the old music building was demolished in order to construct the new building, and the conservatory premises had to be refurbished. The old masonry had to be redone at the junction between the existing building and the new construction. The building cost C$70 million to build, $20 million of which was contributed by Seymour Schulich, a McGill Music alumnus and one of Canada's most important businessmen. The building was created by the architectural firm Saucier + Perrotte Architectes, in association with Menkès Shooner Dagenais LeTourneux and began construction after the music program celebrated its 100-year anniversary in 2004. This construction was originally called the New Music Building, but was renamed the Elizabeth Wirth Music Building in 2015 after the Schulich School of Music received a $7.5 million gift from McGill alumna Elizabeth Wirth. The naming ceremony took place in front of new the building on October 7, 2015.

== Layout ==
The Elizabeth Wirth Music Building has 8 floors above ground and two below ground, with the bottom floor containing the Wirth Opera Studio and the Music Multimedia Room (MMR), one of the largest sound stages in North America. The first floor comprises a spacious lobby with a mezzanine, and the Tanna Schulich Hall, an intimate performance venue with seating for 187 people. The third, fourth and fifth floors contain the Marvin Duchow Music Library, with the fifth floor also containing the Gertrude Whitley Performance Library and the Music Student Computer Room, which was updated in 2008. The sixth floor contains faculty office spaces, while the seventh floor contains the administration for the School of Music. The eighth floor is home to the research group, Centre for Interdisciplinary Research in Music Media and Technology (CIRMMT).

== Architecture ==
The Elizabeth Wirth Music Building has eight storeys that evoke the eight geological layers of the earth. With the building being located at the eastern edge of McGill campus on the corner of Sherbrooke Street and Aylmer Street, Gilles Saucier, the project manager, considered the new wing to be the access point to the campus and to the mountains. He said, originally in French, "It is as if the McGill campus is playing the role of a geological plate that moves the urban grid, which is accentuated by the design of the building." This is why the first floors are made of stone and concrete while those above are made of glass.

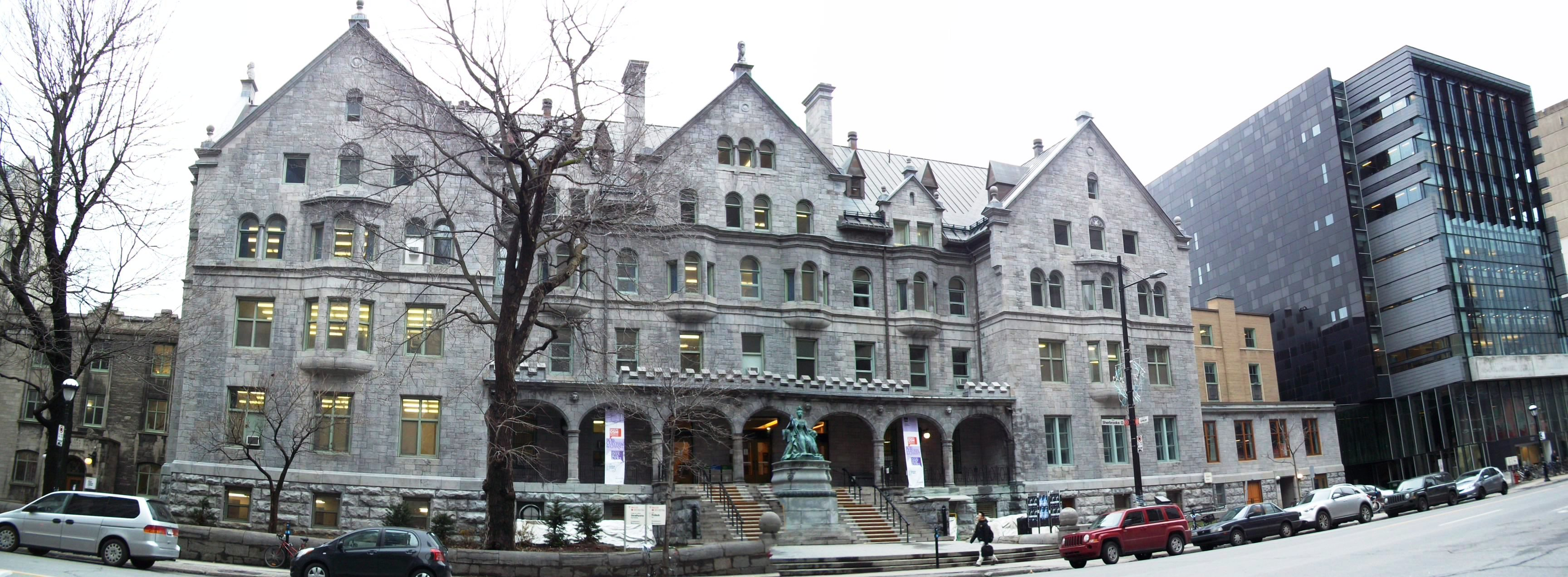
The Strathcona Music Building (at left) is connected to the Elizabeth Wirth Music Building

The design of the building is anchored by the multimedia studio, which is encased in a polished limestone volume nearly five storeys tall (18 by 24 by 15 metres (59 ft × 79 ft × 49 ft)), submerged three storeys into the ground at the north end of the lot, up Aylmer Street. This space has incredible acoustic insulation, with no noise coming either from ventilation, mechanics, lighting or the outside. Practice rooms and technical studios occupy the basement floors south of the multimedia studio as this provides the best acoustics. When viewed from the outside, a folded concrete plane separates the multi-level main lobby from the library above. The intention of this concrete plane was to "evoke an eroded ground plane leading to Montreal's prominent Mount Royal beyond," according to the architects.

The building is linked to the older Strathcona Building by a box-like glazed bridge, which physically protrudes into the wall of the older building on one end, and into the main lobby of the new building on the other. The east and west facades of the building are smooth planes that frame the views of the city toward the mountain. The east facade is clad in black and grey zinc, with long strip windows, and a large glazed opening into the library entry space. The west facade is made up of matte and polished aluminum which reflects the Strathcona Building adjacent to it, while a series of punched windows evoke the music rolls of antique mechanical pianos. The front facade, which faces south toward Sherbrooke Street, is made almost entirely of glass, allowing ample daylight into the lobby, libraries and conference spaces.

Saucier + Perrotte won the AERMQ Award of Excellence (2006) and the Canadian Architect Award of Excellence (1994) for their design of the Elizabeth Wirth Music Building.

== See also ==
- McGill University buildings and structures
- Leacock Building
- Macdonald-Harrington Building
- McGill School of Architecture
