= Charles Reiner =

Canadian pianist and music educator of Hungarian birth

Charles Reiner (7 April 1924 – 19 August 2006, Montreal) was a Canadian pianist and music educator of Hungarian birth. He won several competitions, including the Geneva International Music Competition in 1948. After moving to Montreal in 1951 he became a naturalized Canadian citizen. He performed internationally as both a concert pianist and accompanist, and performed frequently on CBC Radio and CBC Television during his career. He had a lengthy and fruitful collaboration in concert and on record with the violinist Henryk Szeryng. He was a founding member of both the Canadian Piano Quartet and Musica Camerata Montreal. He taught for forty years on the music faculty of the Schulich School of Music at McGill University.

== Life and career ==
Charles Reiner was born in Budapest, Hungary on 7 April 1924. A child prodigy, he made his professional debut as a concert pianist at a very young age with the Budapest Philharmonic Orchestra. Born to Jewish parents, he was interned in a Nazi concentration camp in Austria during World War II. Following his release from the camp, he pursued studies at the Franz Liszt Academy of Music in his native city; earning a diploma in 1947. His teachers at the academy included Árpád Hanák, Arnold Székely, and Bela Böszörmenyi-Nagy.

After winning the prestigious Geneva International Music Competition in 1948, Reiner was awarded a scholarship to the Conservatoire de Musique de Genève where he studied with Dinu Lipatti and Louis Hiltbrandt. In 1949 he won that school's gold medal for virtuosity. In 1950 he won first prize in a music competition sponsored by the International Refugee Organization of the United Nations.

In 1951 Reiner immigrated to Canada where he settled in Montreal; ultimately becoming a naturalized Canadian citizen. He gave a concert tour of Canada in 1951-1952 with stops in 40 cities under the auspices of the Jeunesses Musicales of Canada. He became a much sought after accompanist, and performed in that capacity with several well known artists; including Colette Boky, Maureen Forrester, Antonio Janigro, Arthur LeBlanc, Igor Oistrakh, Joan Patenaude, Louis Quilico, Jean-Pierre Rampal, Ruggiero Ricci, Joseph Rouleau, and Richard Verreau to name a few. He made numerous recordings and appeared frequently in concerts with the violinist Henryk Szeryng. Their partnership began in 1954 and together they made 35 records and performed in more than 900 concerts internationally.

In addition to his performance career, Reiner was a member of the music faculty at McGill University from 1954-1994. He also taught at the Conservatoire de musique du Québec à Trois-Rivières from 1965-1967, and at the École normale de musique de Montreal. One of his pupils was the pianist Paul Stewart.

Reiner died in Montreal on 19 August 2006. His papers and other artifacts connected to Reiner are part of the collection of the Marvin Duchow Music Library.
