= Hcma =

Canadian architectural firm

hcma
- Formerly: Roger Hughes Architects
- Industry: Architecture and planning
- Founded: 1976
- Headquarters: Vancouver, British Columbia, Canada
- Key people: Roger Hughes (founder)

hcma architecture + design (often stylized as "hcma" in all lowercase) is a Vancouver-based Canadian architecture and design firm operating in the three Canadian centres of Vancouver, Edmonton, and Victoria.

== History ==
hcma was founded by Roger Hughes in 1976 under the name "Roger Hughes Architects". The firm's operations revolve around various services related to architectural and interior design. The firm also operates Tilt, an artist-in-residence program.

== Select projects ==
- West Vancouver Aquatic Centre and Community Centre, Vancouver, British Columbia (2009)
- Hillcrest Centre, Vancouver, British Columbia (2011), converted from the Vancouver Olympic/Paralympic Centre
- University of British Columbia Ponderosa Commons, Vancouver, British Columbia (2013) with KPMB
- Grandview Heights Aquatic Centre, Surrey, British Columbia (2016)
- Complexe Aquatic de Laval, Laval, Quebec (2017) with NFOE
- Clayton Community Centre, Surrey, British Columbia (2021)
- Mill Woods Library, Seniors' and Multicultural Facility, Edmonton, Alberta (2015) with Dub Architects Ltd
- CESM Soccer Center, Montreal
