= Henryk Szeryng =

Polish-Mexican violinist (1918–1988)

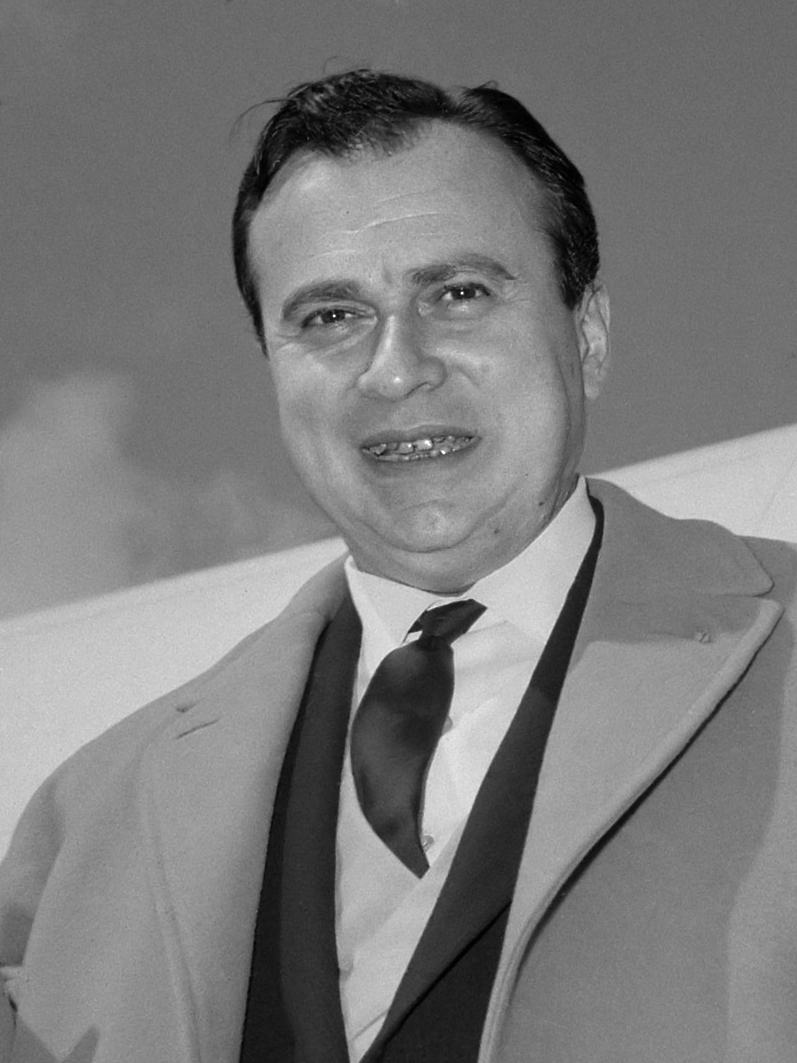
- Henryk Szeryng, 1964
- Born: 22 September 1918; Warsaw, Kingdom of Poland
- Died: 3 March 1988 (aged 69); Kassel, West Germany
- Citizenship: Poland, Mexico
- Occupation: Violinist

Henryk Bolesław Szeryng (usually pronounced HEN-r-ik SHEH-r-in-g) (22 September 1918 – 3 March 1988) was a Polish-Mexican violinist.

== Early years ==
He was born in Warsaw (Note: He was not born in Żelazowa Wola as often stated.), Poland on 22 September 1918 into a wealthy Jewish family. The surname "Szeryng" is a Polish transliteration of his Yiddish surname, which nowadays would be spelled "Shering" in the modern Yiddish-to-English transliteration.

Szeryng began taking piano and harmony lessons from his mother at the age of five, and switched to the violin at the age of seven, studying with Maurice Fraenkel. After studying with Carl Flesch in Berlin (1929–1932), he went on to the Conservatoire de Paris, where he furthered his studies with Jacques Thibaud, graduating with a premier prix in 1937.

== Career ==
He made his solo debut on 6 January 1933 playing the Brahms Violin Concerto with the Warsaw Philharmonic Orchestra under Romanian conductor George Georgescu. From 1933 to 1939 he studied composition in Paris with Nadia Boulanger.

When World War II broke out, Władysław Sikorski, the premier of the Polish government in exile, asked Szeryng, who was fluent in seven languages, to serve as his liaison officer and interpreter. Szeryng took these positions and discontinued his studies, although he continued to perform on the violin, giving over 300 concerts for Allied troops all over the world. When he accompanied Sikorski on a mission to Mexico in 1941 seeking a home for 4,000 Polish refugees, the positive reception moved Szeryng so deeply that he decided to become a Mexican naturalized citizen, and did so in 1946. In 1945, he accepted the request (made in 1943) that he head the string department of National University of Mexico.

In 1954, the pianist Arthur Rubinstein, also a Jewish refugee from Poland, gave a concert in Mexico City; Szeryng visited him backstage afterwards and accepted Rubinstein's invitation to come to his hotel to play music. Szeryng's playing of solo violin music of Johann Sebastian Bach that night, said Rubinstein, "reduced me to tears....Real music lovers want emotion—great moments—which Szeryng's playing gives them." Rubinstein encouraged Szeryng to begin concertizing again, and introduced him to impresario Sol Hurok to help achieve this end. Rubinstein and Szeryng made music together regularly for the rest of their careers, and recorded much of the classic chamber music literature either as a duo or in a trio with cellist Pierre Fournier. Szeryng went on to win such major awards as six Grand prix du Disque awards, the Médaille d'Argent of the city of Paris, two Edison Awards, and was also made an Officer of the Ordre des Arts et Lettres in Paris in 1963, among many other honors received. In 1964, he began a collaborative partnership with the pianist Charles Reiner. Together they made 35 records and performed in more than 900 concerts internationally.

In 1960, Szeryng was named the Mexican Cultural Ambassador. In 1966, by which time he had moved to Paris, he was designated Honorary Director of the Conservatory of Music in Mexico City, and a Henryk Szeryng Music Festival was held in his honor in Mexico City. He returned to Mexico twice a year and traveled on a diplomatic passport as Mexico's official cultural ambassador, but lived in Paris for two decades, then spent his last five years in Monaco. In 1970, Szeryng recorded Mozart's complete works for violin and orchestra for Philips Records, which was used as Volume 8 of The Complete Mozart Edition in 1991.

Szeryng died of a cerebral hemorrhage in Kassel, Germany, on 3 March 1988. He was buried at Cimetière de Monaco, the headstone bearing the concluding bars of the Ciaconna from Bach's Partita No.2 for solo violin.

== Notable recordings ==
Szeryng made a number of recordings, including two complete cycles of sonatas and partitas for violin by Johann Sebastian Bach, and several sonatas by Beethoven and Brahms with Arthur Rubinstein. He was also the first violinist in history to record Niccolo Paganini's then newly discovered 3rd violin concerto. His recordings of Mozart and Beethoven's piano and violin sonatas with Ingrid Haebler are widely esteemed. A 1960-released vinyl featured Szeryng, with Charles Munch conducting the Boston Symphony Orchestra, performing Tchaikovsky's Violin Concerto in D.

== Partial discography ==
- Johannes Brahms, Violin Concerto op. 77. Henryk Szeryng, violin. London Symphony Orchestra, Pierre Monteux, conductor. Recorded in 1959.
- Pyotr Ilyich Tchaikovsky, Violin Concerto op. 35. Henryk Szeryng, violin. Boston Symphony Orchestra, Charles Munch, conductor. Recorded in Boston's Symphony Hall on 9 February 1959.
- Ludwig van Beethoven, Sonatas for violin and piano, A Major op. 47, and F Major op. 24. Henryk Szeryng, violin. Arthur Rubinstein, piano. Recorded 1958. Released 1960.
- Édouard Lalo, Symphonie Espagnole in D Minor op. 21. Henryk Szeryng, violin. Chicago Symphony Orchestra, Walter Hendl, conductor. 1961.
- Johannes Brahms, Sonatas for violin and piano, No. 2 A Major op. 100, and No. 3 D Minor op. 108. Henryk Szeryng, violin. Arthur Rubinstein, piano. 1962.
- Fritz Kreisler, "Szeryng plays Kreisler, and Other Treasures for the Violin." Henryk Szeryng, violin. Charles Reiner, piano. 1963.
- Johann Sebastian Bach, Sonatas and Partitas for Solo Violin. Henryk Szeryng, violin. Recorded 1968.
- Camille Saint-Saëns, Violin concerto n°3, Havanaise op.83, Introduction et Rondo apricioso op.28, Maurice Ravel, Tzigane, Henrik Szeryng, violin, Orchestre National de l'Opéra de Monte Carlo, conductor Édouard Van Remoortel. Recorded 10/1969. CD Philips 1988
- Manuel Ponce, Violin Concerto. Rodolfo Halffter, Violin Concerto op. 11. Henryk Szeryng, violin. Royal Philharmonic Orchestra, Enrique Batiz, conductor. 1985.
- Alban Berg, Violin Concerto, Henryk Szeryng, violin. Symphonieorchester des Bayerischen Rundfunks, Rafael Kubelík, conductor.1971.
- Jean Martinon, Violin Concerto no. 2, Henryk Szeryng, violin. Symphonieorchester des Bayerischen Rundfunks, Rafael Kubelík, conductor.1971.
- Mendelssohn, Violin Concerto in E minor Op. 64. Schumann Violin Concerto in D minor Op. posthumous. London Symphony Orchestra, Antal Dorati conductor. 1965. Philips SAL 3504.

== Violins ==
He owned the Guarneri del Gesù "Le Duc" of 1744; the Andrea Guarneri "Santa Theresa" of 1683; the Stradivarius "Hercules" of 1734; as well as the Messiah Strad copy by Jean-Baptiste Vuillaume of 1860 which he gave to Prince Rainier III of Monaco. The "Le Duc" was the instrument on which he performed and recorded mostly. In December 1972, he donated the "Hercules" to the City of Jerusalem to honor the 25th anniversary of the founding of the State of Israel, with the stipulation that it be loaned out for the use of outstanding young Israeli violinists. He also donated the "Santa Theresa" to Mexico in 1974 with a similar stipulation that it be loaned for the use of outstanding young Mexican violinists.

== Awards and recognitions ==
Grammy Award for Best Chamber Music Performance:

- Pierre Fournier, Arthur Rubinstein & Henryk Szeryng for Schubert: Trios Nos. 1 in B Flat, Op. 99 and 2 in E Flat, Op. 100 (Piano Trios) (1976)
- Pierre Fournier, Arthur Rubinstein & Henryk Szeryng for Brahms: Trios (Complete)/Schumann: Trio No. 1 in D Minor (1975)
- Grand Prix du Disque 1959 for the Brahms violin concerto with the London Symphony Orchestra conducted by Pierre Monteux
- Grand Prix du Disque for the Bach Solo Sonatas and Partitas (DGG)

== Quotes ==
- "In 1941 he accompanied the prime minister to Latin America to find a home for some 4,000 Polish refugees; the refugees were taken in by Mexico, and Szeryng, in gratitude, settled there himself, becoming a naturalized citizen in 1946. Throughout World War II, he appeared in some 300 concerts for the Allies. After the war, he pursued a brilliant international career; was also active as a teacher. In 1970 he was made Mexico's special adviser to UNESCO in Paris. He celebrated the 50th anniversary of his debut with a grand tour of Europe and the U.S. in 1983."
- "A cosmopolitan fluent in 7 languages, a humanitarian, and a violinist of extraordinary gifts, Szeryng became renowned as a musician's musician by combining a virtuoso technique with a probing discernment of the highest order."
