= Paul Stewart (pianist) =

Canadian pianist

Paul Stewart is a Canadian pianist. Brought up in New Glasgow, Nova Scotia, he started learning piano at the age of five. He initially studied with a local teacher, and subsequently with Tietje Zonnefeld in Halifax, Nova Scotia. At the age of 18 he moved to attend McGill University in Montreal, where he studied with Charles Reiner. He later studied with Kendall Taylor in London and Arturo Benedetti Michelangeli in Italy.

He made his orchestral debut in 1981 with the Toronto Symphony Orchestra. In 1996, Paul Stewart made his debut at London's Wigmore Hall (broadcast by the BBC), and at the Moscow Conservatory played Rachmaninoff’s Fourth Piano Concerto with the Moscow Radio Symphony Orchestra, a performance broadcast by radio throughout Russia and subsequently released on CD. He works as a soloist with orchestras, in solo recital and in chamber music in Canada, the United States, Europe and Asia.

Recordings include Benjamin Britten’s "Young Apollo" with I Musici de Montréal (Chandos); "An die Musik: lieder by Schubert and their transcriptions" (CBC Records); Concerto No 4 by Sergei Rachmaninoff and Sonata No 7, "Night Wind" by Medtner (Palexa); Medtner's "Complete Works for Piano and Violin," 2 Volumes (Naxos).

Since 2002 he has been Professor of Piano at the Université de Montréal.
