= Saucier + Perrotte =

Canadian architectural firm

Practice information
- Firm type: Architecture
- Founders: Gilles Saucier; André Perrotte
- Founded: 1988
- No. of employees: 16
- Location: Montreal, Quebec, Canada

Significant works and honors
- Buildings: Perimeter Institute for Theoretical Physics; Faculty of Pharmaceutical Sciences Building, UBC; CCIT Building, U of T; Elizabeth Wirth Music Building, McGill University
- Awards: RAIC Gold Medal; Governor General's Medal in Architecture (x9)

Website
- http://saucierperrotte.com/

Saucier + Perrotte Architectes is an architectural firm based in Montreal, Quebec. The firm was founded in 1988 by architects Gilles Saucier and André Perrotte, and is known for designing institutional, cultural and residential projects.

The firm's portfolio ranges from single family homes, such as Résidence dans les Laurentides, to major institutional buildings, such as the UBC Faculty of Pharmaceutical Sciences, the Perimeter Institute for Theoretical Physics in Waterloo, Ontario, and the Communication, Culture and Technology Building at University of Toronto Mississauga.

Saucier + Perrotte represented Canada at the Venice Biennale of Architecture in 2004. It has received more than 100 awards for their work, including the RAIC Gold Medal in 2018, and nine Governor General's Medals in Architecture. The firm believes in the symbolic and physical aspect of the architectural setting; merging architecture, landscape, and geology together.

As of March 2020, the firm comprises a small team of fewer than 20, with Gilles Saucier as the Design Partner and André Perrotte as the Project Architect.

== History ==
Gilles Saucier and André Perrotte met in the School of Architecture at Laval University in the early 1980s. They both earned their Bachelor of Architecture degrees from the university in 1982. While working together in Montréal for Cayouette et Saia, they decided to start their own practice. In 1988, they founded Saucier + Perrotte Architectes in Montreal, Quebec.

The firm's projects range from small buildings, such as the Guest House in the Laurentian Mountains (2007), to institutional buildings, such as the Communication, Culture and Technology Building for the University of Toronto at Mississauga (2004) and the Perimeter Institute for Theoretical Physics in Waterloo, Ontario (2004).

In 2004, Saucier + Perrotte Architectes represented Canada at the Architecture Biennale of Venice.

== Design Approach ==
The firm emphasizes the symbolic and physical importance of the architectural setting; merging architecture, landscape, and geology into one. Their designs often depict and capture the nature and mood of what is happening inside, through shapes, materials, and colours.

Most of their projects, such as the Anne-Marie Edward Science Building, UBC Faculty of Pharmaceutical Sciences, Perimeter Institute for Theoretical Physics, have achieved LEED certification.

Projects range from single family homes to neighbourhood redevelopment and master planning, from pavilions, museums, and theatres to residential complexes, from product designs to interior designs.

== Founders ==
=== Gilles Saucier ===
Gilles Saucier (born 22, December, 1959 in Ste-Françoise, Quebec) grew up in the countryside, interested and inspired by the nature and trees surrounding him. He previously studied biology in university, however, 2 years in, he switched into architecture. His drawing teacher referred him to an architecture professor, who accepted him on the spot.

Gilles Saucier received his architectural degree from Université Laval in Quebec City in 1982. Saucier is responsible for the overall design of every project. Aside from design, Saucier is an avid photographer. Photography helps refine his approach to architecture.

Since 1989, many universities in North America have invited him to be a guest lecturer and critic, including the University of Toronto, McGill University, University of Montreal, University of British Columbia, University of Seattle, and Massachusetts Institute of Technology. He is currently a course lecturer at the McGill School of Architecture.

=== André Perrotte ===
André Perrotte (born 6, June, 1959 in Ste-Foy, QC) received his Bachelor of Architecture at Laval University in Quebec City in 1982. Perrotte is responsible for coordinating the design and construction process steps, as well as managing the dossier of every client. Perrotte works with Saucier to design and communicate information between all design processes. Perrotte manages multidisciplinary teams, from costs to schedules, control to production, and techniques to construction systems. He approaches construction as a contemporary cultural expression.

Perrotte has been invited as a guest critic and lecturer by many Canadian universities, including the University of Toronto, University of Waterloo, University of Montreal, McGill University, and UQAM (University of Quebec at Montreal).

== Projects ==
=== Complexe Sportif Saint-Laurent (Saint-Laurent Sports Complex) ===
2017, Montreal, Canada

In collaboration with HCMA Architecture + Design.

The Saint-Laurent Sports Complex is located between the character neutral and horizontally formed Émile Legault School and Raymond Bourque Arena. The Sports Complex design had to physically and visually connect with Marcel Laurin Park (north of the site), and the green band running along Thimens Boulevard.

The two natural environments in the urban context is linked through both steel sculptural buildings. The translucent, white, and prismatic building, contrasts the black, horizontally stretched building, while inviting pedestrians on the Boulevard inside, and providing a passage for the park for the pedestrians. The two volumes give a floating impression to elicit the various activities taking place inside (training, sports, athletics, etc.). The ideas of movement and energy are showcased by the building's composition.

=== Stade de Soccer de Montréal (Montreal Soccer Stadium) ===
2015, Montreal, Canada

In collaboration with HCMA Architecture + Design.

Previously known as Miron Quarry, a mining centre, and finally a landfill, the city is now restoring the ecology and environment of the site. The Stade de Soccer de Montréal appears as a layer of mineral stratum, expressed by the roof, from the park's artificial topography. The architect's goal was to bring a spectrum of people together, under one roof, unified by sport.

A continuous roof cantilevers over the plaza entrance, folding down over the indoor soccer field, and reaching to the ground to become outdoor spectator seating for the field. The stadium provides both options of an indoor soccer centre and an open-sky stadium to cater to its users’ needs. The stratum is made with a single gesture of Cross-Laminated Timber (CLT) to support the roof. The roof's interlaced beams appear erratic, suspended over the site; however, its density is determined by the areas where more structural support is needed.

=== Anne-Marie Edward Science Building at John Abbott College ===
2012, Montreal, Canada

The Anne-Marie Edward Science Building is in the John Abbot College campus, in a rural setting along Lake Saint-Louis.

The design stems from its landscape, with its L-shaped design surrounding an ancient ginkgo tree. The building's form creates a courtyard for the purpose of celebration, protection, and reflection of the tree. In response to the campus layout, the building was orienting southwest, accommodating those who travel to and from its central void. The north façade is cladded with COR-TEN steel, relating alongside to the red-bricked historical buildings. Inside, the architects designed the central staircase to be a sculptural and abstracted version of a tree, with branches of stairs spanning into its laboratories, classrooms, and offices. The large atrium allows the landscape to flow through its tall, vertical glazed walls, letting in natural light. The building's glass material palette reflects the surrounding context, with different glass tones of light and dark grey, and white juxtaposing one another.

=== UBC Faculty of Pharmaceutical Sciences / CDRD ===
2012, Vancouver, Canada

In collaboration with HCMA Architecture + Design.

The UBC Faculty of Pharmaceutical Sciences is in the heart of UBC's campus, designed to act as a gateway for students travelling to the southeast part of the university.

The building design is conveyed through the concept of a tree. The architects designed interconnected meeting spaces to strengthen and promote new methods of individual and collaborative research, for the researchers, professors, students, and the community. Similarly, a tree grows branches that intertwine to create a unified system above the earth. The branch system of the building is represented by floating canopies, hanging over the ground level. With its conceptual tree trunks, natural light permeates through the atria into collaborative spaces. The façade is constructed of glass and steel, while the interior is constructed with wood cladding, cast concrete, white walls, and yellow and black accents.

=== Scandinave Les Bains Old Montreal ===
2009, Montreal, Canada

Scandinave Les Bains Vieux-Montréal is situated in Old Montreal and overlooks the Old Port. The building, formally known as a warehouse, was restored half a century ago due to fire damage and now houses an urban spa on its ground level.

The spaces were inspired by the duality of the hot and cold phenomena, with white, glacial volumes contrasting the warmth radiating off the volcanic rocks. The walls, ceiling, and floors are slightly angled to heighten the visitors’ awareness with their surroundings. Like natural topography, small slopes are created by the small undulations in the ground, leading to the basins of bathing water. The undulating wood-cladded ceiling continues throughout the spa. Architectural reveals result from the white marbled walls meeting with the warm-coloured wooden ceiling. Natural light glows through the translucent glass in the building's existing openings.

=== Résidence dans les Laurentides (Residence and Guest House in the Laurentian Mountains) ===
2007, Montreal, Canada

Near the ski hills of Mont-Tremblant houses this single-family residence and guest house. The Private Residence and Guest House in the Laurentian Mountains contains three main volumes – living, eating, and sleeping. The residence consists of three bedrooms, living areas, a recreation room, a sauna, and a screened outdoor living room.

Within the folded landscape, a private exterior space is created from the north façade and a three-meter-high rock outcrop. Erosion caused the volumes to drift to the side; formally parallel to the residence, the guesthouse slid westwards, separating from the main mass of the home. The design takes on the wooden elements from the site, as well as implementing traditional architectural elements local in the area. Tones of brown, green, and grey, as well as rough wood cladding imitate its surrounding nature.

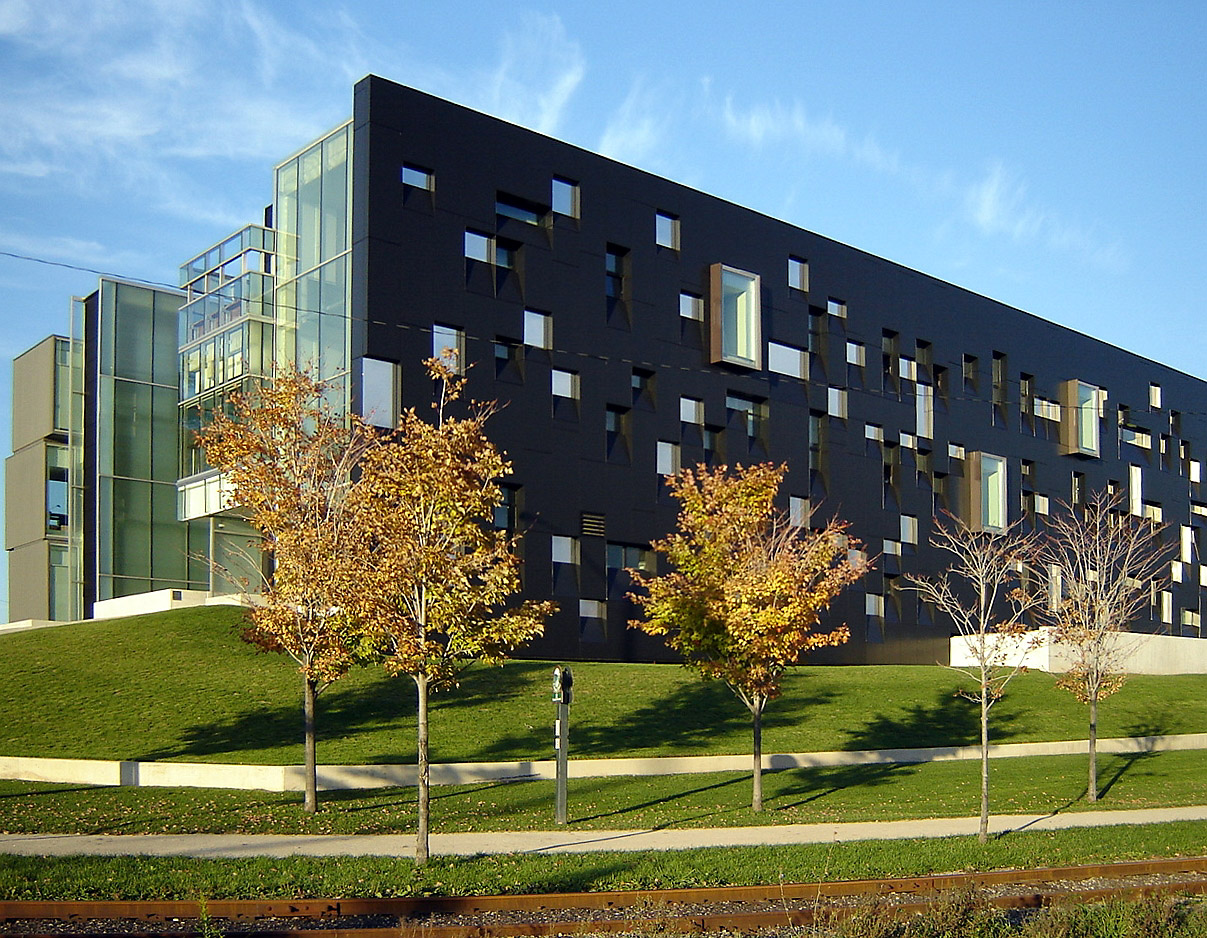
Perimeter Institute for Theoretical Physics, 2004, Waterloo, Canada

=== Perimeter Institute for Theoretical Physics ===
2004, Waterloo, Canada

Located on the shore of Silver Lake, North of Waterloo's downtown core, sits Perimeter Institute.

The design is inspired by theoretical physics - information rich and complex in concepts. A large pool to the north of the institute reflects the cantilevered, three-storey series of zinc-and-glass offices. The anodize aluminium south façade contains an abstract pattern of punched windows and polished stainless-steel mechanical grills, reflecting the enigmatic subject of physics. The layout is arranged around two central spaces, the main hall and garden. The main hall provides direct access to all programs, with vertical circulation from the concrete staircases descending along one side of the atrium. Wooden ceilings of lounge spaces contrast the glass and concrete materiality of the atrium.

=== Communication, Culture, Information and Technology Building, University of Toronto at Mississauga (CCIT Building) ===
2004, Mississauga, Canada

At the edge of the university's campus, enclosed by a park and a courtyard garden, sits the CCIT building. The building is a place of occupancy, adjacency, and transition, as it creates a linear public circulation space between the Student Centre and the Library.

The concept was to bring the natural landscape through the building, into the courtyard garden, and through to the campus. The fully transparent glazed façade diminishes the line between the interior and exterior. Conceptual strands of landscape are vertically woven throughout the structure, connecting students and spaces together through bridges, ramps, platforms, and staircases. The building provides open and interactive spaces for its occupants, classrooms, and the outside environment.

=== Jardin des Premières Nations (First Nations Garden-Pavilion) ===
2001, Montreal, Canada

Within the Montreal Botanical Garden, this outdoor pavilion, built along the primary garden passageway, was built in commemoration of the Great Peace of Montreal of 1701.

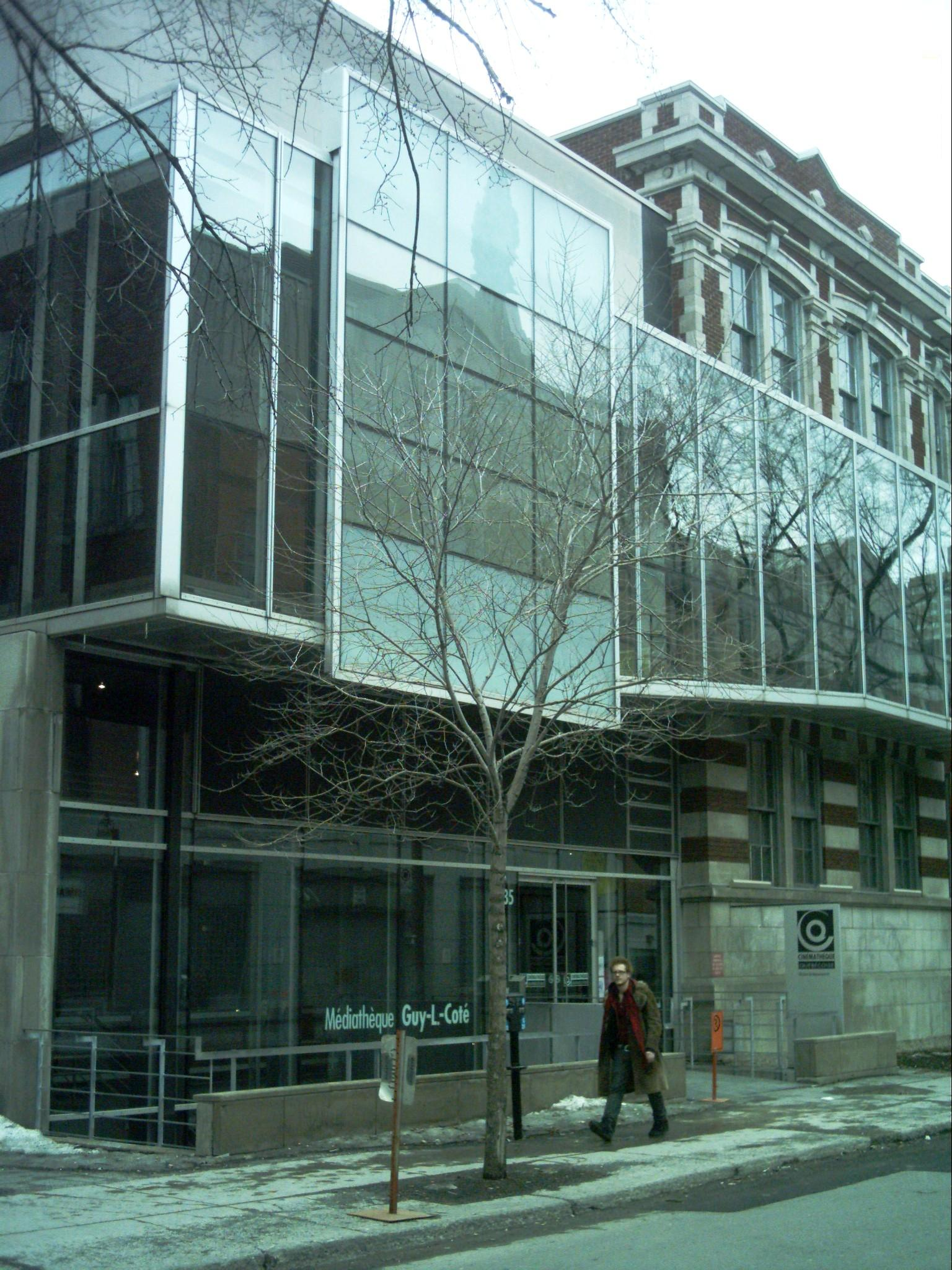
Cinémathèque québécoise, 1997, Montreal, Canada

The design of the First Nations Garden Pavilion showcases the customs, traditions, and knowledge of the First Nation peoples. The pavilion signifies the connection between site and building, acting as a link between the spruce and maple areas of the forest around it. The thin, undulating, concrete roof shelters the exhibition, restroom, boutique, and office spaces. The pavilion's exterior spaces are integrated into the surrounding environment through the minimal design of vertical surfaces, leaving an open terrain between the building and the site.

=== Cinémathèque québécoise ===
1997, Montreal, Canada

Built into the gap of two existing buildings, the design of the Cinémathèque québécoise demonstrates the relationship between the old and new, interior and exterior, and actor and audience.

The “light box” entrance from de Maisonneuve Boulevard explores the qualities of film through its light-weight steel frame structure and illumination. A gridded glazed screen cantilevers over the sidewalk, while laterally extending to the restored, historical, stone and brick façade of its neighbouring building. The lateral extension forms a ramp walkway for people to move through the building. Videos and images are projected onto the translucent segments of the glass screen, for pedestrians to view. Thus, silhouetted images of those walking on the ramp behind the screen are projected onto the glass façade.

=== Other projects ===
List of Built Projects
Year	Project
2019	River City Toronto Phase 3
2017	Stikeman Elliott
2017	Complexe sportif Saint-Laurent
2015	River City Toronto Phase 2
2015	Stade de soccer de Montréal
2014	Lofts on St-Urbain
2013	River City Toronto Phase 1
2012	Anne-Marie Edward Science Building at John Abbott College
2012	UBC Faculty of Pharmaceutical Sciences / CDRD
2011	Cahier d’Exercices
2010	Michel Brisson Boutique, 1074 rue Laurier West
2010	Denis Gagnon Shows All
2010	Philippe Dubuc Boutique in Quebec
2010	Thompson Residences
2009	Scandinave Les Bains Old Montreal
2008	Schulich School of Music and Marvin Duchow music library, McGill University
2007	Residence and Guest House in the Laurentian Mountains
2007	Michel Brisson Boutique, 384 St-Paul Street
2007	7043 Waverly, Office of Saucier + Perrotte architectes
2007	1973: Sorry, Out of Gas
2006	Philippe Dubuc Flagship Store in Montreal
2004	Perimeter Institute for Theoretical Physics
2004	Found Objects, 2004 Venice Biennale of Architecture
2004	Communication, Culture, Information and Technology Building, University of Toronto at Mississauga
2004	DOTS Light
2003	Jet Films Offices
2003	Théâtre Sans Fil
2003	Michel Brisson Boutique, 1012 Laurier Street West
2003	New College Student Residence, University of Toronto
2001	First Nations Garden Pavilion
2001	Childhood Landscape / Topographical Unfolding
1999	Gérald-Godin College
1999	Orbite Hair and Beauty Salon
1998	The Montreal Garden in Shanghai
1997	Université de Montréal Faculty of Design and Planning
1997	Cinémathèque Québécoise, Museum of Cinema and Video
1995	Usine C / Théâtre Carbone 14
1994	Cossette Agency
1991	Théâtre d’Aujourd’hui
1991	Théâtre du Rideau Vert

== Awards ==
The firm has received two International Architecture Awards (presented by the Chicago Athenaeum and the European Centre for Architecture Art Design and Urban Studies), three P/A Progressive Architecture honours (presented by Architect Magazine), and 9 Governor General's Medals in Architecture (presented by the Royal Architectural Institute of Canada). In 2009, the firm received the RAIC Award of Excellence for Best Architectural Firm in Canada, as well as a 2018 RAIC Gold Medal.

List of Built Project Awards
Year	Award	Project
2018	Governor General's Medals in architecture – Stade de Soccer de Montréal	Stade de soccer de Montréal
2018	Governor General's Medals in architecture – Complexe Sportif Saint-Laurent	Complexe sportif Saint-Laurent
2017	Design Excellence Award from the Ontario Association of Architects (OAA)	River City Toronto
2017	Excellence Award, Ordre des architectes du Québec (OAQ), Bâtiment civique, Winner	Stade de soccer de Montréal
2017	American Architecture Prize (AAP), Winner in Recreational Architecture	Complexe sportif Saint-Laurent
2017	Design Award for Excellence in Steel Construction, Canadian Institute of Steel Construction (CISC), Institutional Project, Winner	Complexe sportif Saint-Laurent
2017	‘Award of Merit’, Canadian Architect Awards of Excellence	River City Toronto
2016	Wood Design Awards, Honor Award	Stade de soccer de Montréal
2015	AZ Awards finalist / Residential Architecture Multi-Unit	River City Toronto
2014	P/A Progressive Architecture Award Citation 2014 of Architect Magazine	Stade de soccer de Montréal
2014	Governor General's Medal in Architecture	UBC Faculty of Pharmaceutical Sciences / CDRD
2013	Wallpaper Magazine Design Awards 2013 / Best Lab	UBC Faculty of Pharmaceutical Sciences / CDRD
2013	OAQ Grand Prize of Excellence in Architecture	UBC Faculty of Pharmaceutical Sciences / CDRD
2013	Architizer A+ Award Pop Winner	UBC Faculty of Pharmaceutical Sciences / CDRD
2013	Ontario Association of Architects Best in Show Award	UBC Faculty of Pharmaceutical Sciences / CDRD
2013	NWCB Outstanding Project	UBC Faculty of Pharmaceutical Sciences / CDRD
2013	ACEC British Columbia Awards for Engineering Excellence	UBC Faculty of Pharmaceutical Sciences / CDRD
2013	AICQ Structural Design Award	Anne-Marie Edward Science Building at John Abbott College
2013	Ontario Association of Architects Award Of Design Excellence	UBC Faculty of Pharmaceutical Sciences / CDRD
2013	Lieutenant Governor Award of Merit in Architecture	UBC Faculty of Pharmaceutical Sciences / CDRD
2013	Grand Prix du Design FERDIE 2013 / Educational	UBC Faculty of Pharmaceutical Sciences / CDRD
2012	Interior Soccer Centre SMEC First Prize Winner 2012	Stade de soccer de Montréal
2011	Prix Intérieurs FERDIE / Retail Spaces	Michel Brisson Boutique, 1074 rue Laurier West
2011	First Prize Winner SLSC 2011	Complexe sportif Saint-Laurent
2011	OAA Award Of Excellence 2011	Scandinave Les Bains Old Montreal
2011	OAQ Award of Excellence / Commercial Architecture	Boutique Michel Brisson, 1074 rue Laurier Ouest
2011	OAQ Award of Excellence / Commercial Architecture	Scandinave les bains, Vieux-Montréal
2011	AZ Awards / Best Commercial Space	Scandinave les bains, Vieux-Montréal
2011	Canadian Architect Award of Excellence	UBC Faculty of Pharmaceutical Sciences at CDRD
2010	BILD Award 2010 / Best Building Design – High Rise	River City Toronto
2010	Governor General's Medal in Architecture	Scandinave les bains, Vieux-Montréal
2010	Prix Intérieurs FERDIE / Retail spaces	Boutique Philippe Dubuc Québec
2010	Governor General's Medal in Architecture	Résidence dans les Laurentides
2010	International Architecture Award presented by the Chicago Athenaeum	Scandinave les bains, Vieux-Montréal
2009	Prix Design Exchange (DX) 2009	Scandinave les bains, Vieux-Montréal
2009	OAQ Award of Excellence / Interior Design	7043 Waverly, Agence Saucier + Perrotte architectes
2009	Prix Intérieurs FERDIE / Project of the Year	Scandinave les bains, Vieux-Montréal
2009	Prix Intérieurs FERDIE / Spa Prize	Scandinave les bains, Vieux-Montréal
2009	Canadian Architect Award of Merit	Anne-Marie Edward Science Building at John Abbott College
2008	International Architecture Award presented by the Chicago Athenaeum	Perimeter Institute for Theoretical Physics
2008	Prix intérieurs FERDIE / Office Spaces	Boutique Michel Brisson, 384 rue Saint-Paul Ouest
2008	Prix Intérieurs FERDIE / Office Spaces	7043 Waverly, Agence Saucier + Perrotte architectes
2008	Governor General's Medal in Architecture	Communication, Culture, Information and Technology Building, University of Toronto at Mississauga
2008	Grand Prix Créativité Montréal / Office Spaces	7043 Waverly, Agence Saucier + Perrotte architectes
2008	Grand Prix Créativité Montréal / Boutiques	Boutique Michel Brisson, 384 rue Saint-Paul Ouest
2008	Grand Prix Créativité Montréal / All Categories	Boutique Michel Brisson, 384 rue Saint-Paul Ouest
2007	Prix Intérieurs FERDIE	1973: Désolé, plus d'essence
2007	Prix Intérieurs FERDIE / Lighting Award	Boutique Philippe Dubuc Montréal
2007	Prix Intérieurs FERDIE / Retail Spaces	Boutique Philippe Dubuc Montréal
2007	OAA Award for Design Excellence	Communication, Culture, Information and Technology Building, University of Toronto at Mississauga
2007	OAQ Award of Excellence / Institutional Architecture	Communication, Culture, Information and Technology Building, University of Toronto at Mississauga
2007	Mississauga Urban Design Award of Excellence	Communication, Culture, Information and Technology Building, University of Toronto at Mississauga
2006	AERMQ Award of Excellence	Schulich School of Music & Marvin Duchow music library, McGill University
2006	ArchiZinc Award / Paris	Perimeter Institute for Theoretical Physics
2006	Grand Prix Créativité Montréal	Boutique Philippe Dubuc Montréal
2006	Governor General's Medal in Architecture	Perimeter Institute for Theoretical Physics
2005	Building Magazine Out of the Box Award	Théâtre Sans Fil
2005	Building Magazine Out of the Box Award	Perimeter Institute for Theoretical Physics
2005	OAQ Award of Excellence / Institutional Architecture	Perimeter Institute for Theoretical Physics
2005	OAA Award of Excellence / Institutional	Perimeter Institute for Theoretical Physics
2004	Canadian Architect Award of Excellence	Residence Prud’Homme Dulude, Mont-Tremblant, Quebec
2003	OAQ Award of Excellence / Institutional Architecture	Jardin des premières nations
2003	Best of Canada / Canadian Interiors Award	Boutique Michel Brisson, 1012 rue Laurier Ouest
2002	Governor General's Medal in Architecture	Jardin des premières nations
2001	Architecture Magazine PA Award	Perimeter Institute for Theoretical Physics
2001	Canadian Architect Award of Excellence	New College Student Residence, University of Toronto
2000	Canadian Architect Award of Excellence	Jardin des premières nations
2000	Orange Prize / Renovation “Sauvons Montréal”	Collège Gérald-Godin
2000	OAQ Award of Excellence / Honourable Mention	Salon Orbite
2000	OAQ Award of Excellence / Institutional Architecture	Collège Gérald-Godin
2000	OAQ Award of Excellence / Grand Prix of Excellence	Collège Gérald-Godin
1999	Governor General's Medal in Architecture (for merit)	Cinémathèque québécoise
1999	Canadian Architect Award of Excellence	Jardin de Montréal à Shangai
1999	Canadian Architect Award of Excellence	Collège Gérald-Godin
1998	Grand Prize Winner, Canadian Interiors Awards	Cinémathèque québécoise
1998	OAQ Award of Excellence / Institutional Architecture	Cinémathèque québécoise
1997	OAQ Award of Excellence / Institutional Architecture	Usine C / Théâtre Carbone 14
1997	Governor General's Award of Merit in Architecture	Usine C / Théâtre Carbone 14
1995	The Art of CAD First Prize	Faculté d'Aménagement de l'Université de Montréal
1995	OAQ Award of Excellence / Honourable Mention	Usine C / Théâtre Carbone 14
1995	Orange Prize / Renovation “Sauvons Montréal”	Usine C / Théâtre Carbone 14
1995	Canadian Architect Award of Excellence	Faculté d'Aménagement de l'Université de Montréal
1995	OAQ Award of Excellence / Honourable Mention	Cossette Agency
1994	Canadian Architect Award of Excellence	Schulich School of Music & Marvin Duchow music library, McGill University
1991	Grand Prize OAQ / OAQ Awards of Excellence	Théâtre du Rideau Vert
1990	Canadian Architect Award of Excellence	Théâtre d'Aujourd'hui
