= Clayton Community Centre =

Recreation center in Surrey, Canada

- Community Center
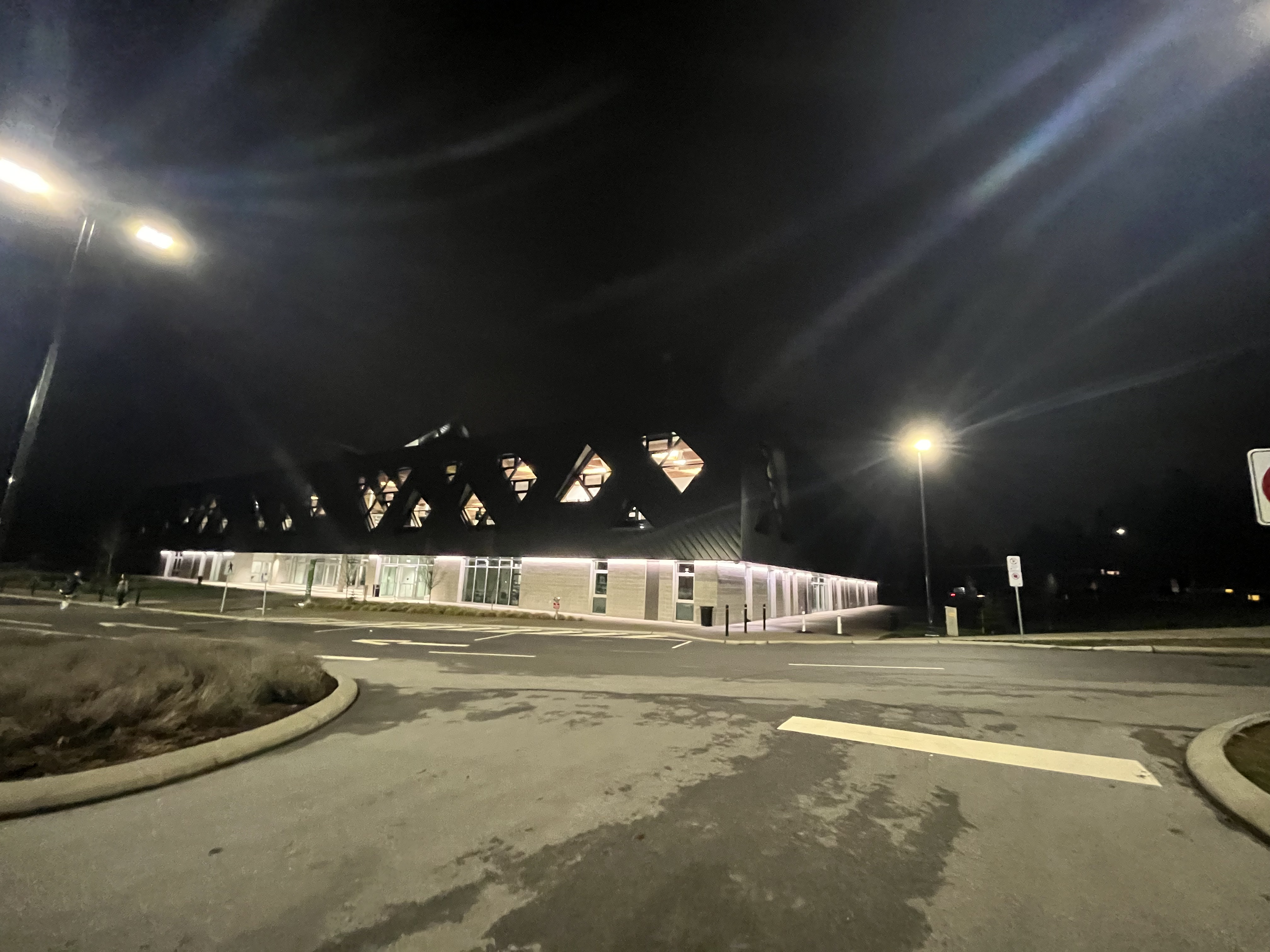
- Clayton Community Center photographed at night
- Builder: HMCA
- Completed: 2021
- Cost: CAD 43.5M
- Amenities: library, weight room, gym, spin studio, arts space
- Owner: City of Surrey
- Address: 7155 187A Street; Surrey BC
- Interactive map of Clayton Community Centre
- Coordinates: 49.13313353938583°N 122.70477372823736°W
- Website: https://www.surrey.ca/parks-recreation/recreation-facilities/clayton-community-centre

Clayton Community Center location

Clayton Community Centre is a community recreation centre located in Surrey, British Columbia, Canada. The building is the largest Passive House green building in Canada The building uses up to 90% less energy than similar buildings.

The facility contains music studios, an indoor cycling studio, weight room, gymnasiums, demonstration kitchen, preschool, woodworking shop and demo kitchen as well as a 14,000 square foot branch of Surrey Libraries
