= Saint-Michel environmental complex =

Multi-functional park in Montreal

Coordinates: 45°33′48″N 73°37′44″W

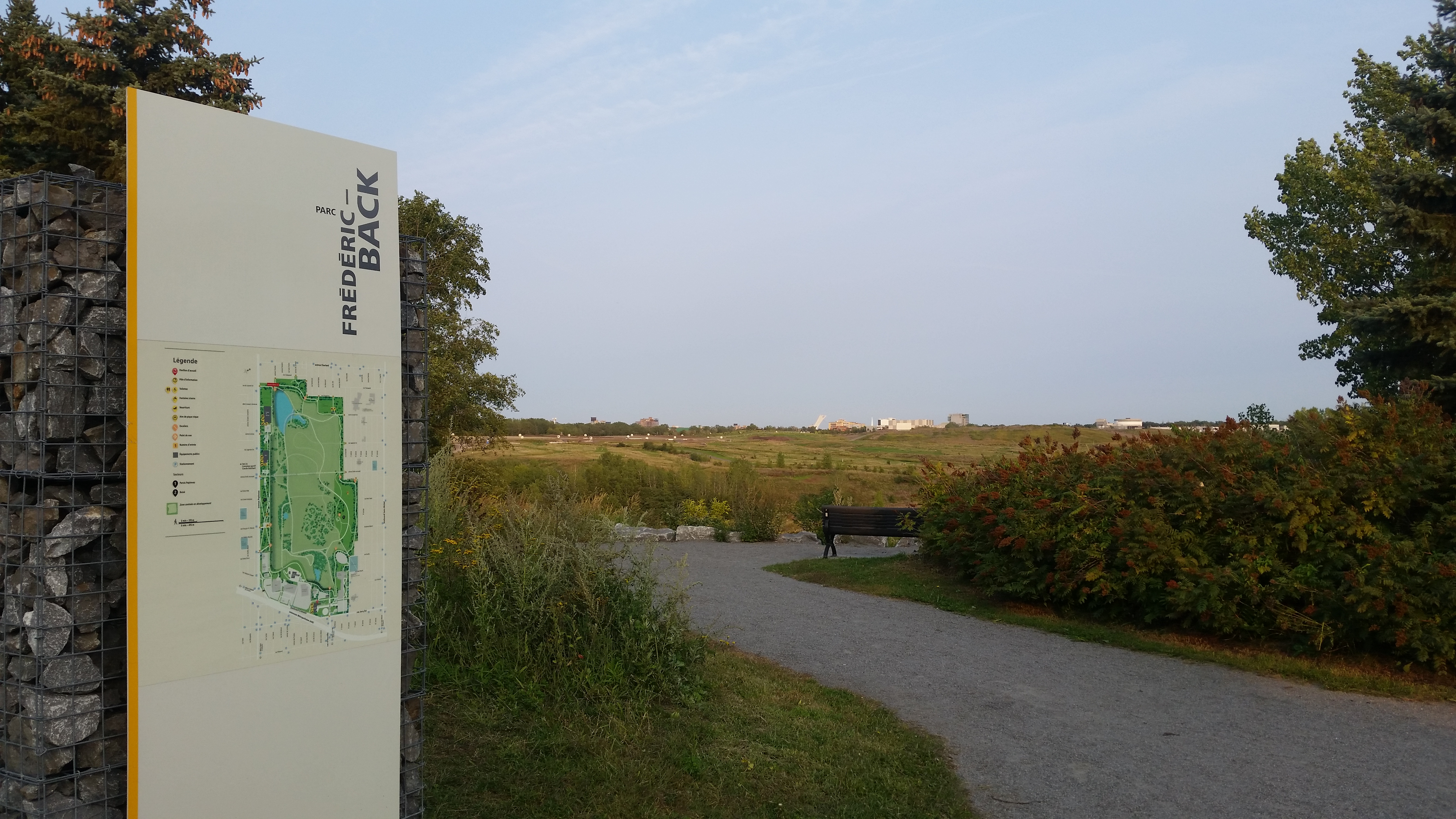
Frédéric-Back Park - North Entrance. You can see the Olympic Stadium in the distance.

The Saint-Michel environmental complex is a large multi-functional park in Montreal, Quebec, Canada. It is located in borough of Villeray–Saint-Michel–Parc-Extension on the site of a former limestone quarry, the Miron Quarry. Its current area is 192 hectares (470 acres), and has 5.5 kilometres (3.4 miles) of pathways.

The 192-hectare area originally was a limestone quarry, in 1968 it was converted into a landfill of 75 hectares. In 1984 it was acquired by the city of Montreal to transform it into an environmental technology and education complex. The majority of the area is taken up by the Frédéric-Back Park, which sits atop 40 million tonnes of garbage contained in the landfill.
