= Marvin Duchow Music Library =

Marvin Duchow Library Archival Collection
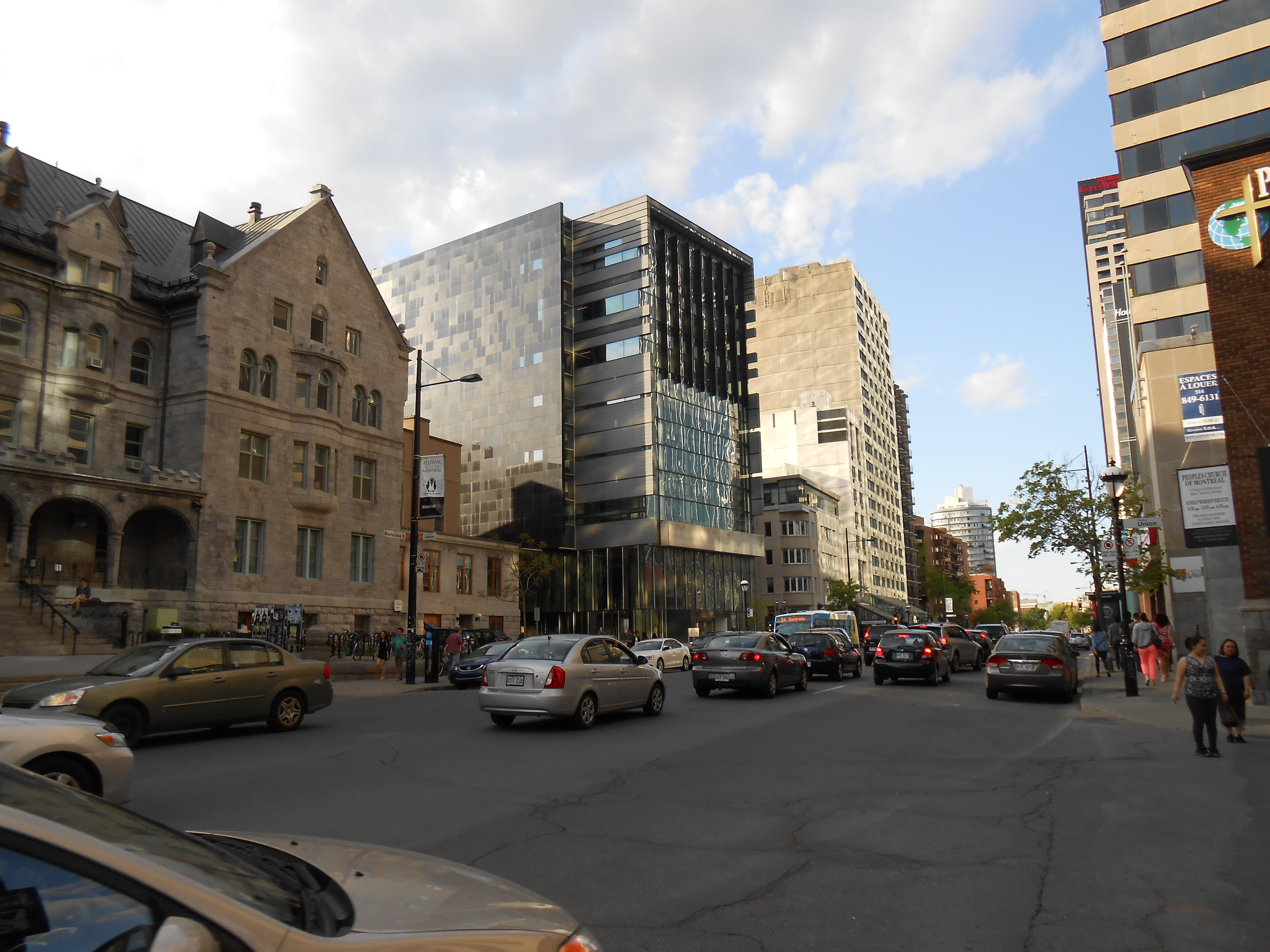
- The Schulich School of Music and the Marvin Duchow Musical Library
- Interactive map of Marvin Duchow Library Archival Collection
- 45.506449765299266°N 73.57262714651219°W
- Location: 3rd floor - 527 Sherbrooke Street West, Montreal, Canada
- Type: Musical archive
- Affiliation: McGill University
- Website: https://mcgill.ca/library/branches/music, https://archivalcollections.library.mcgill.ca/index.php/marvin-duchow-music-library

The Marvin Duchow Music Library is a branch of McGill University Library. Its mandate is to "provides resources and services to support the performance, composition, research, and teaching programs of the Schulich School of Music".

== Description ==
Located in Montreal, at the third, fourth and fifth floors of the Elizabeth Wirth Music Building, the library contains printed scores, recordings, books and journals, and other data related to music and its performance. More than 200 000 documents are accessible to visitors, making the collection one of the most important in Canada, documenting Renaissance scores, Baroque music, jazz recordings and 20th-century music. The library also offers audio and video equipment to its members, including microphones, playback equipments, turntables...

Pianos are available to visitors and members in the library.

== Archival collection ==
The library also contains a small archival collection, which contains correspondence, photographs, programmes and audio and video recordings documenting Canadian music, both classical and avant-garde, through artists such as Kelsey Jones and Bernard Gagnon, which taught or were students of McGill University.

=== Contents of the collection ===
Name of the fonds	Inventory Number	URL
Charles Reiner Collection	MDML 001	https://archivalcollections.library.mcgill.ca/index.php/charles-reiner-collection
Donald Mackey Collection	MDML 004	https://archivalcollections.library.mcgill.ca/index.php/donald-mackey-collection
Kelsey Jones Collection	MDML 009	https://archivalcollections.library.mcgill.ca/index.php/kelsey-jones-collection
Paul Pedersen Collection	MDML 014	https://archivalcollections.library.mcgill.ca/index.php/paul-pedersen-collection
Richard Coulter Collection	MDML 019	https://archivalcollections.library.mcgill.ca/index.php/richard-coulter-collection
Sonde Collection	MDML 021	https://archivalcollections.library.mcgill.ca/index.php/sonde-collection
Hellmuth Wolff Organ Collection	MDML 022	https://archivalcollections.library.mcgill.ca/index.php/hellmuth-wolff-organ-collection
Bernard Gagnon Fonds	MDML 027	https://archivalcollections.library.mcgill.ca/index.php/bernard-gagnon-fonds
Gian Lyman Collection	MDML L1	https://archivalcollections.library.mcgill.ca/index.php/gian-lyman-collection
