= Frédéric-Back Park =

Urban park in Montreal, Canada

- Parc Frédéric-Back
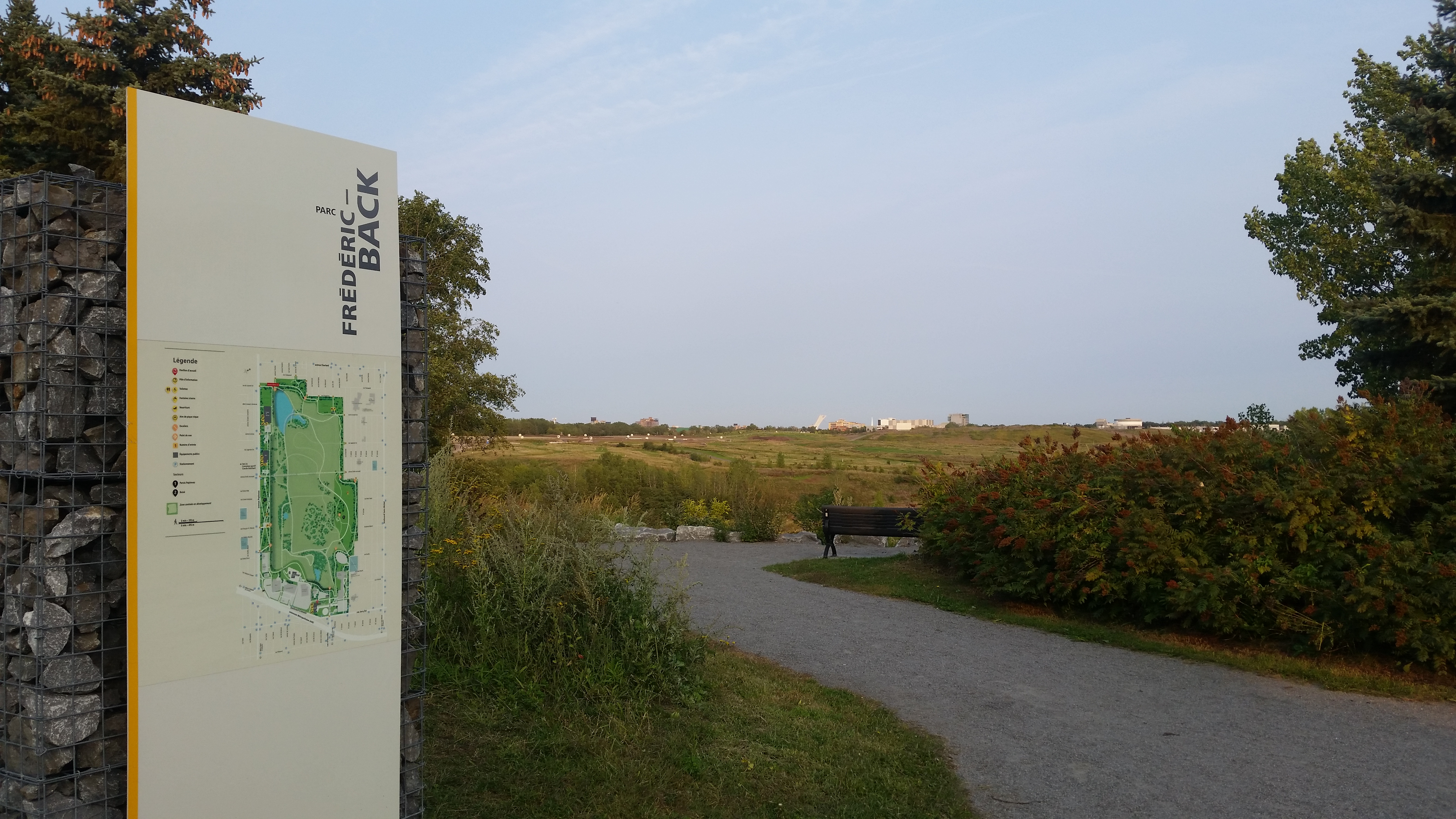
- North entrance of the park

- Location within Montreal
- Type: Urban park
- Location: Villeray–Saint-Michel–Parc-Extension, Montreal, Quebec, Canada
- Coordinates: 45°33′48″N 73°37′44″W
- Area: 43 hectares (110 acres)
- Operator: City of Montreal
- Open: 6:00 a.m. to 12:00 a.m.
- Status: Open all year
- Public transit: STM Bus: 45, 54, 94, 193
- Website: Parc Frédéric-Back

Frédéric-Back Park (French: Parc Frédéric-Back) is an urban park in Montreal, Quebec, Canada. It is within the Saint-Michel environmental complex in the borough of Villeray–Saint-Michel–Parc-Extension. The 192-hectare area originally was a limestone quarry, then a landfill. It is in the midst of a transformation that will see the majority of it become the park. A trail of 5.5 kilometres (3.4 mi) encircles the center of the park. As of 2020, the park has a total area of 48 hectares. When the planned transformation is complete, the park will have an area of 153 hectares.

This will make it one or the largest urban parks in the city of Montreal.

== Toponymy ==
The land on which the park is located was used as a quarry by the Miron family for 60 years. In 1988, the City of Montreal acquired the site in order to make it a landfill site. In 1995, it renamed the site to be the Saint-Michel Environmental Complex because of its location in the Saint-Michel neighborhood.

As of 2020 some landfill activities still take place. In 2016, the part that was destined to become a park was named Frédéric-Back Park in honor of the painter, illustrator and film director Frédéric Back, who notably produced the 1987 film The Man Who Planted Trees.

== History ==
In 1957, all the quarries that operated on the site were united under the Miron banner. Over time, some of the blasting sessions and various accidents severely irritated the local residents. Protests by citizens made themselves heard, as did spokespeople from the Saint-Michel community. As a result, the Miron firm transformed 75 hectares of the quarry into a landfill site for domestic waste.

The City of Montreal acquired the Miron quarry in 1988 and continued the landfill activities. The two chimneys of the cement factory, emblematic of Saint-Michel, were demolished in front of an audience of 50,000 people. During the 1990s, the city set up a sorting center for recycling and a power plant to convert the biogas extracted from the landfill site into electricity.

From 1995, the site constantly was being reworked under the direction of the City in order to make it an urban green space. As of 2020, it is comparable in size to Mount Royal Park. A cycling and pedestrian path, transformed into a cross-country ski trail in winter, is laid out all around the park. In 2017, two new sections, Parvis Papineau and Boisé Est, totaling 17.7 hectares, were opened to the public.

Frédéric-Back Park is set to become one of the largest urban parks in the city by the middle of the 2020s, with an estimated area of 153 hectares (out of the 192 hectares of the complex). It represents “one of the most ambitious environmental remediation projects ever undertaken in an urban setting in North America". The works is planned to be completed by 2026.

== Current uses ==
As of 2020, almost 75 hectares are still used for waste disposal. In addition to the park, the complex includes a recyclable material recovery center, an electric power station operating through the recovery of biogas, a composting site, and a landfill site.

The Center of Expertise on Residual Materials (French: Centre d'expertise sur les matières résiduelles) (CEMR), dedicated to the research and application of efficient, ecological and sustainable management of residual materials is located in the complex. For several years now, the Cité des Arts du cirque (TOHU), a non-profit organization, has been installed on the site. Its mission is to make Montreal an international capital of the circus arts, to contribute to the environmental rehabilitation of the landfill site, and to support the community development of the Saint-Michel district.

== Description ==
Spheres intended to protect the biogas collection wells are scattered throughout the eastern sector of the park. Their spherical shape is intended to prevent noticing any ground movement, due to the nature of its content (of the waste). They also are phosphorescent and emanate a green color at dusk.

In order to raise awareness of a new way of seeing consumption, the park is zero waste. This means that no collection equipment is made available in the park and that each person is responsible for bringing their waste back out of the park.

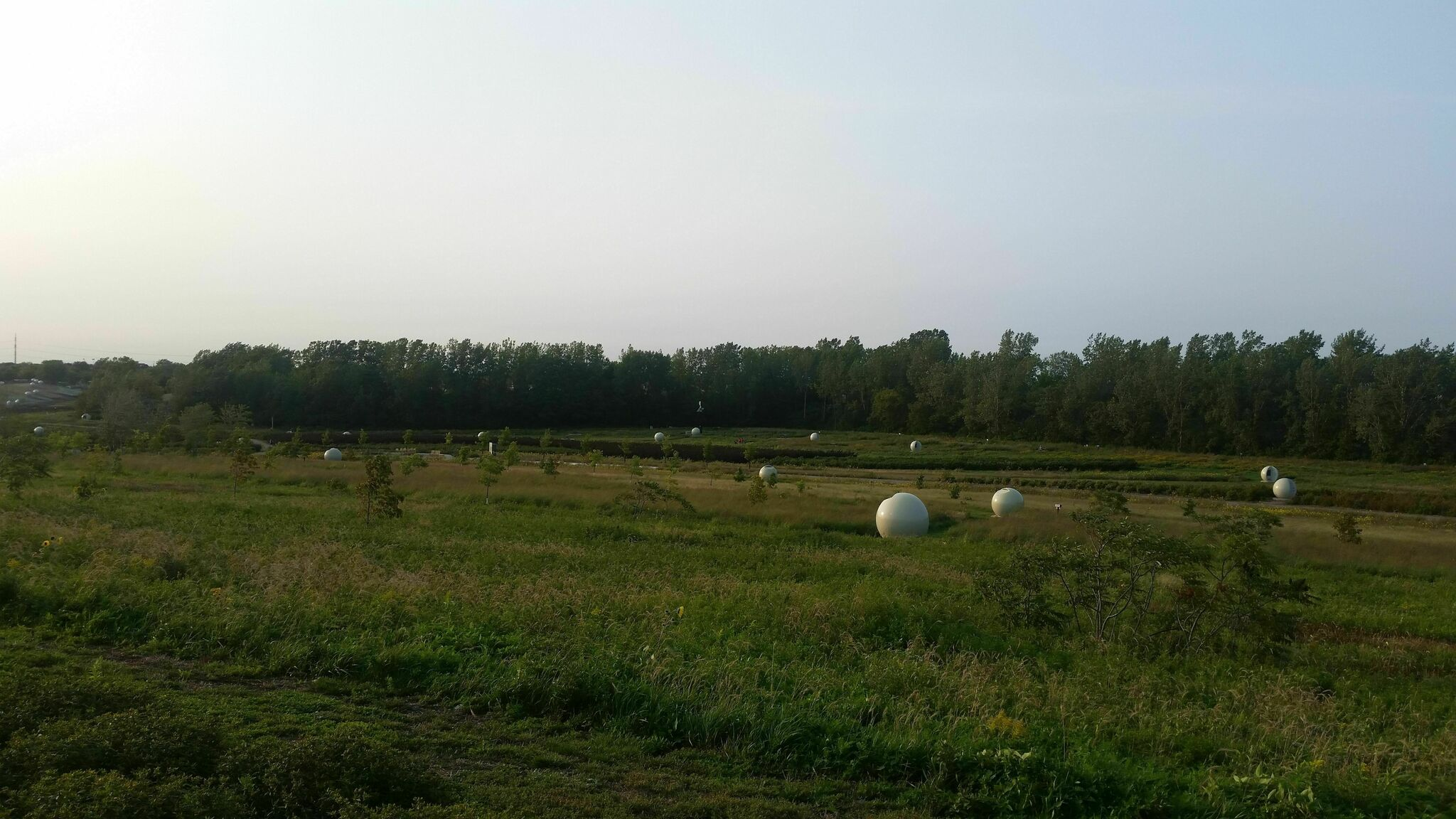
East Wooded Area

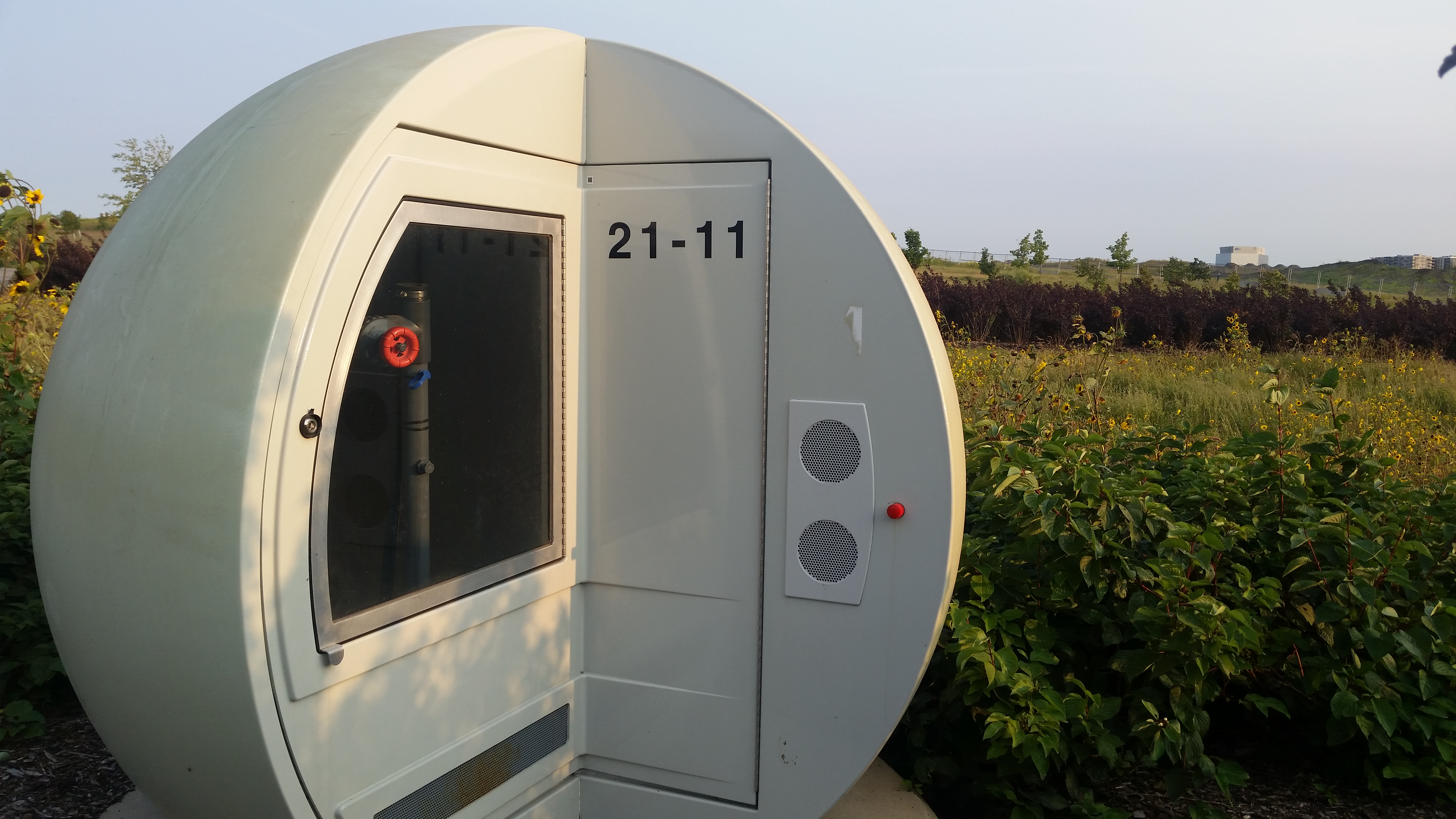
Biogas Collection Well Spheres

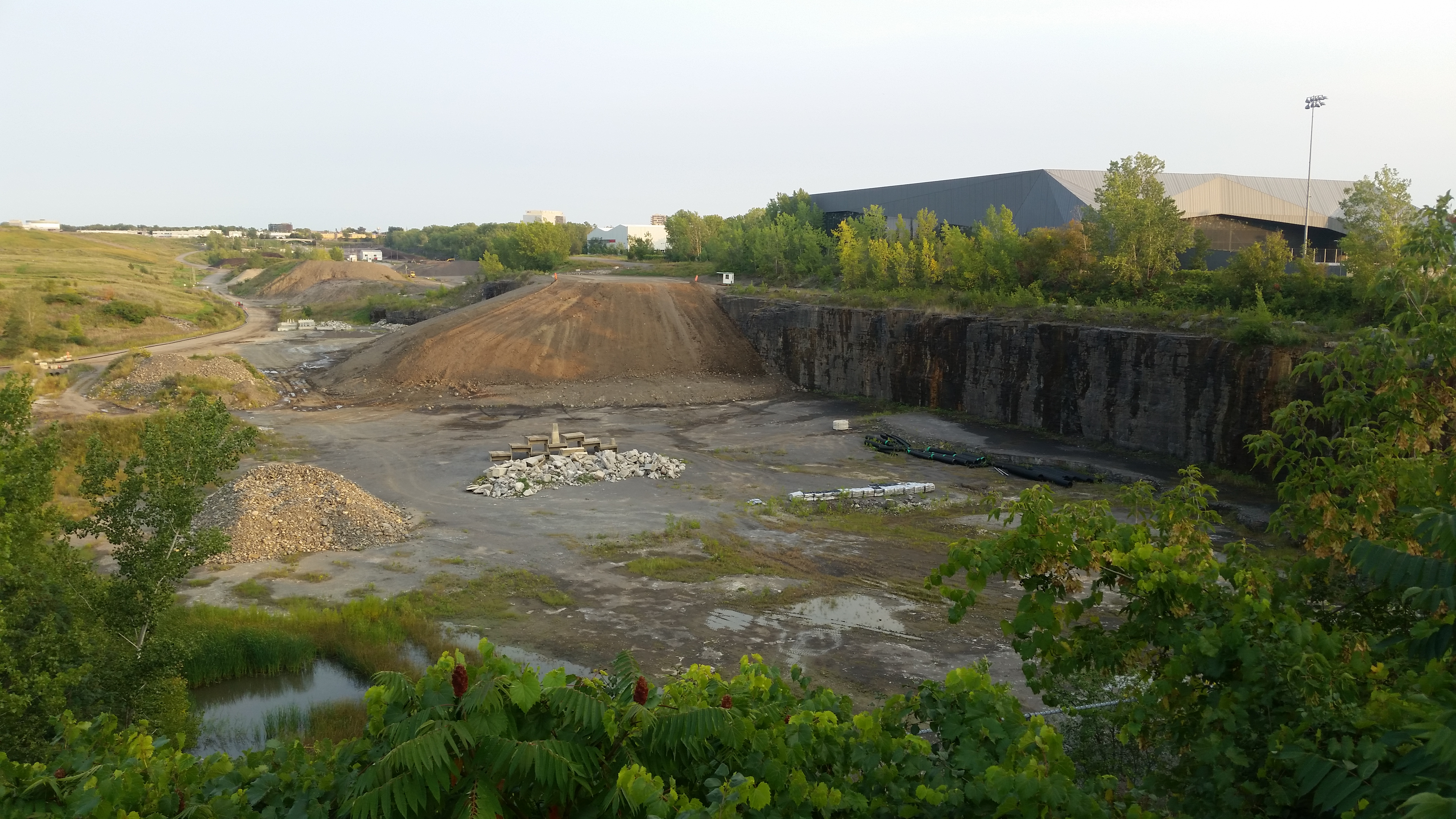
Old Miron Quarry

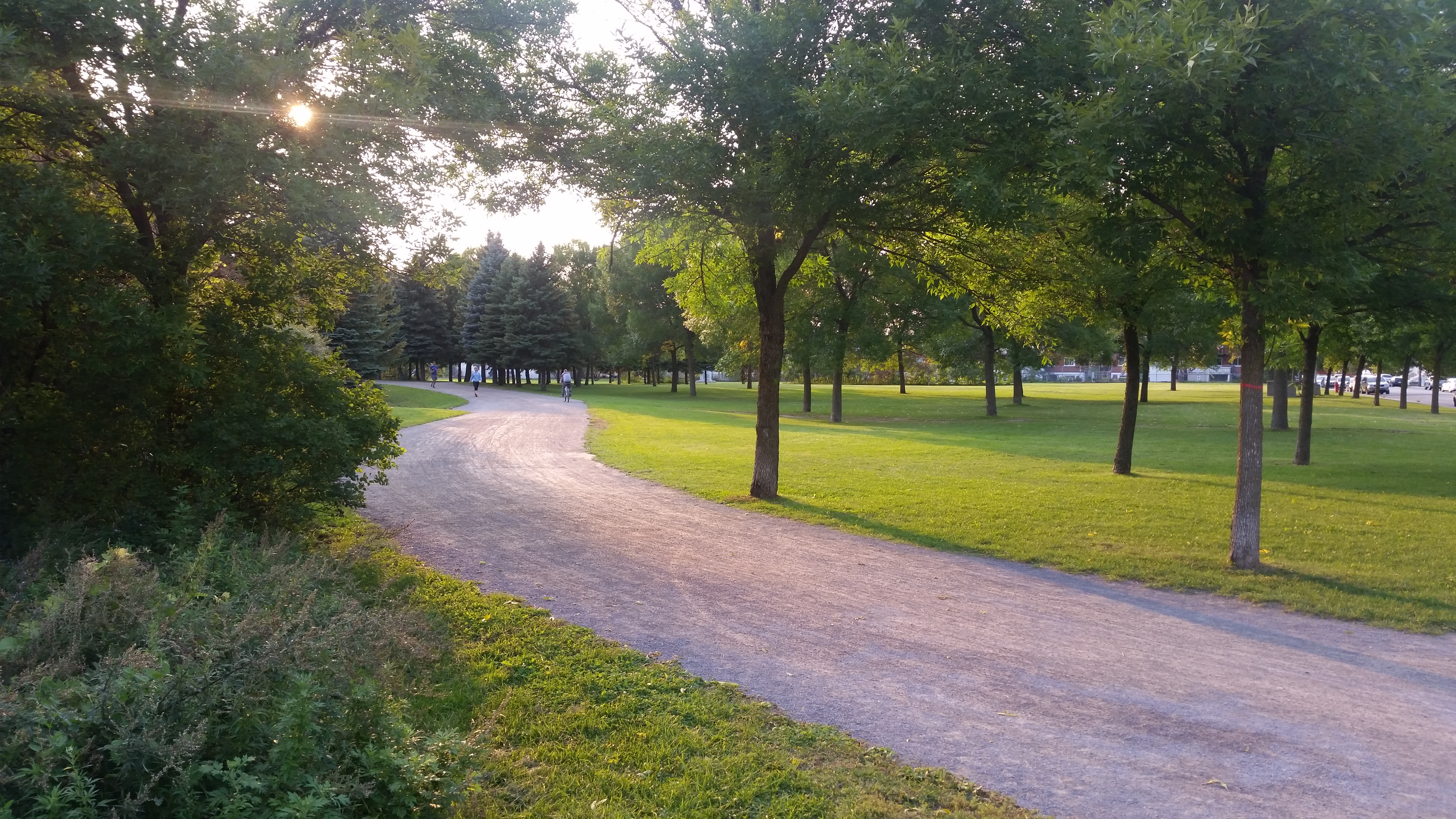
North Trail of Frédéric-Back Park

== Art ==
=== Anamnèse 1+1 ===
Anamnèse 1+1
- Artist: Alain-Martin Richard
- Completion date: 2017
- Location: Villeray–Saint-Michel–Parc-Extension, Montreal, Quebec, Canada
- Owner: City of Montreal

Anamnèse 1+1 is a permanent work that was installed in the park in 2017. The artist Alain-Martin Richard created it after a two-year cultural consultation with the residents of the area.

The work is composed of two parts. One part is a cast aluminum rectangular volume, from the top of which emerges a tree as a sign of renewal. The other part includes thirty partially buried stones along the nearby path, words and reproductions of residents appearing on them.

== Prizes and Distinctions ==
The park rehabilitation project has received many distinctions:

- Winner of the 2018 Grands Prix du Design in the Urban Furniture category for its design of 250 biogas-capturing wells
- Gold Medal - Environmentally Sustainable Projects Award
- Merit - The International Award for Liveable Communities 2004
- Special Mention - Communities in Bloom 2004
- Espace Montréal at Expo 2010 - Shanghai
