= McGill Faculty of Engineering =

Engineering school of McGill University

Coordinates: 45°30′19″N 73°34′35″W

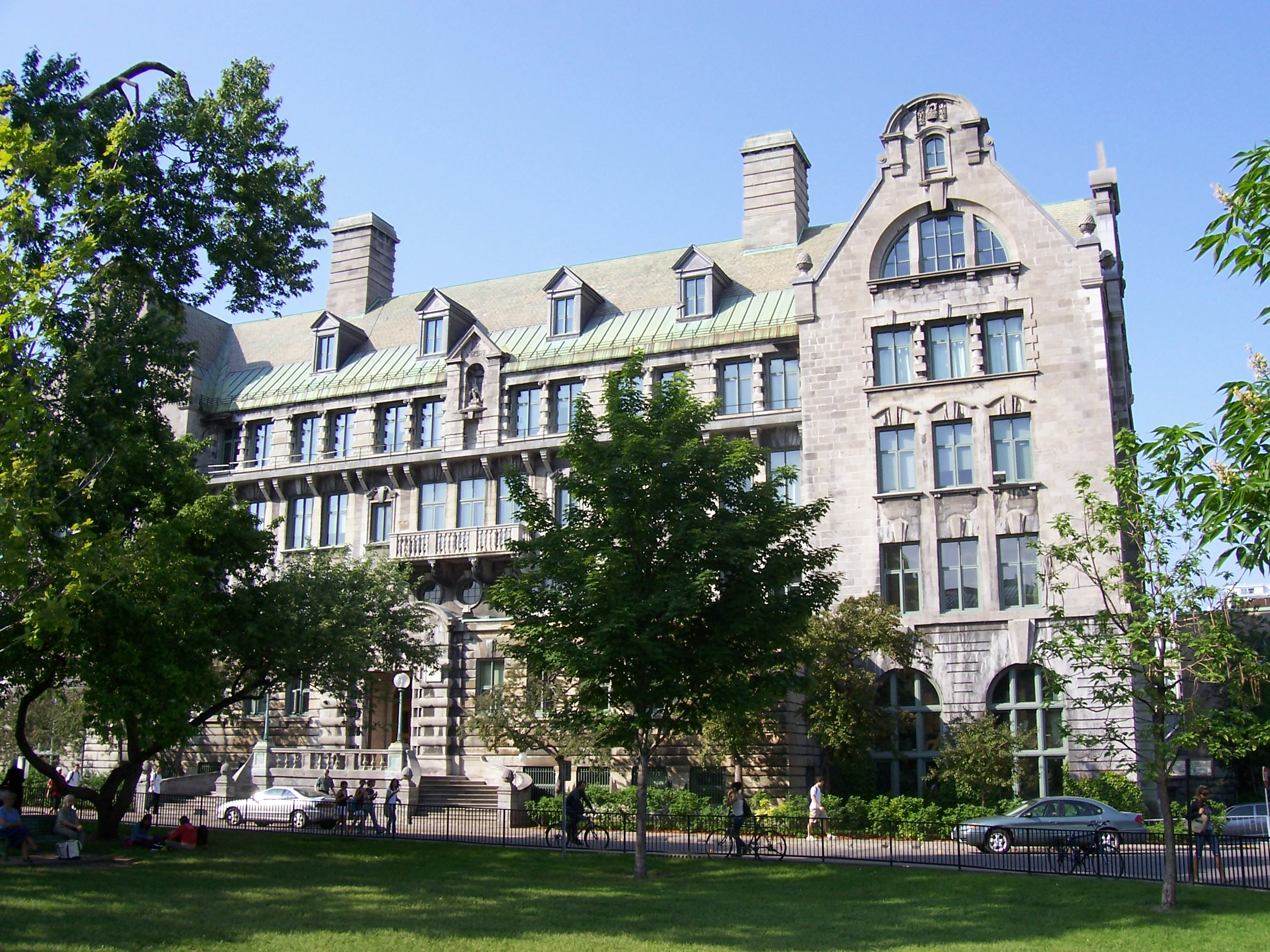
- Motto: "Prove All Things"
- Type: Public engineering school
- Established: 1931
- Parent institution: McGill University
- Dean: Viviane Yargeau
- Faculty: 154 (professors)
- Students: 4,612
- Undergraduates: 3,403
- Postgraduates: 1,209
- Location: Montreal, Quebec, Canada
- Campus: Urban
- Alumni: Over 24,000
- Website: mcgill.ca/engineering

The McGill Faculty of Engineering is one of the constituent faculties of McGill University in Montreal, Quebec, Canada, offering undergraduate and graduate degrees in bio-engineering, bioresource, chemical, civil, computer, electrical, mechanical, materials, mining, and software engineering. The faculty also comprises the School of Architecture and the School of Urban Planning, and teaches courses in bio-resource engineering (Faculty of Agriculture) and biomedical engineering (Faculty of Medicine) at the master's level.

== History ==
=== 1855–1900 ===
Dawson Lectures (1855)

Thirty years before the construction of Engineering's two original edifices; McGill had been offering lectures in Applied Sciences. This series of lectures was started in 1855 by William Dawson, a renowned geologist and McGill's fifth principal which was offered within the Faculty of Arts until the formation of the Department of Applied Sciences in 1871. Dawson accepted the offer, but he traveled to Britain first and while there delivered several papers at the annual meeting of the British Association for the Advancement of Science. Eventually, the lectures formed the core of a two-year curriculum leading to a Diploma in Civil Engineering.

First Engineering Buildings (1893)

For the first time in the history of McGill, buildings are constructed specifically to house engineers. The imposing Macdonald Engineering Building and the more modest Workman Technical Shops were both designed by architect Sir Andrew Taylor and his partner, William Gordon. Featuring a symmetrical Italian Renaissance facade and a Montreal limestone exterior, the five-storey Macdonald building is equipped to meet every conceivable need. Among the facilities housed on its five floors are an apparatus museum, a library, a forge, a foundry, and a dynamo and engine room.

=== 1900–1999 ===
Fire of the Macdonald Building and Rebuilding (1907–1909)

On April 5, 1907, the Macdonald Engineering Building burns. Everything in it, except the contents of the ground floor laboratories, is destroyed. Fortunately, the fire doors that were built in the adjoining Workman Technical Shops (commonly referred to as the Workman Wing) do their job, keeping the building intact and sparing it from significant damage. Less than a week earlier the old Medical Building had burned down. Some of the stone salvaged from this fire was used to add a fourth floor to the Workman shops. The Faculty's sponsor, Sir William Macdonald, again stepped forward, this time volunteering to contribute to build a new structure on the foundation of its predecessor. Percy Nobbs, Director of McGill's School of Architecture is asked to design and build the new structure. The University and Macdonald both stress to him the importance of function and fire resistance. The carved phoenix rising from the flames is one of the few ornaments on a building constructed specifically for fire-proof functionality. Although the phoenix is easy to overlook, the Macdonald Engineering Building is a mainstay on the east side of McGill's downtown campus.

Faculty of Engineering Launched (1931)

The Faculty of Applied Science becomes the Faculty of Engineering in 1931. It offers two degrees – Bachelor of Engineering (BEng) and Master of Engineering (MEng). McGill also introduces a completely revised curriculum in Chemical Engineering, to be administered by the Department of Chemistry.

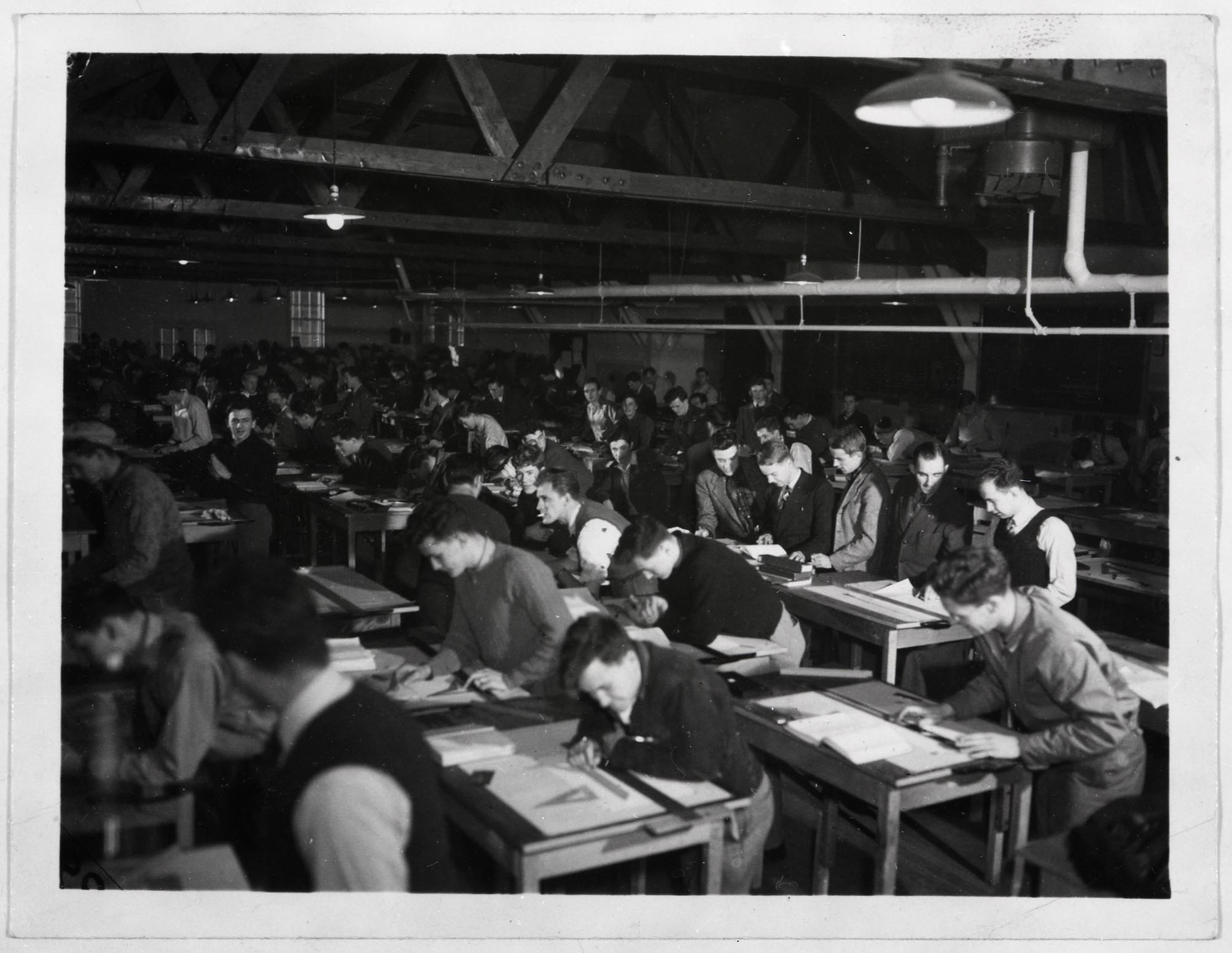
Dawson College Lecture

Dawson College (1945)

Dawson College was opened in 1945 to accommodate the greatly increased enrollment due to the return of students from the armed services and was housed at the R.C.A.F base at St-Jean, Quebec. All first year science and engineering students were transferred there. The number of students enrolled, mainly veterans, reached a peak of 1687 in January 1947. The College was closed in 1950. Dawson College was administered by a Vice-Principal, Dawson College and by various other McGill staff members who undertook duties such as that of Assistant Bursar and Secretary.

First Woman to Graduate From Engineering (1946)

Mary Blair Jackson (later Mary Fowler) graduates from Mechanical Engineering, McGill's first woman engineering (non-Architecture) graduate. She would go on to become a pilot officer at RCAF training command headquarters in Trenton, Ontario, where she conducted statistical work connected with the training of ground crews.

The J.W. McConnell Building Is Completed (1958)

Named in honour of J.W. McConnell, a Governor of the University from 1927 to 1958, the new four-storey McConnell Engineering Building is officially dedicated by Chancellor Ray Edwin Powell on October 6, 1958. The new building doubles the Faculty's space and provides much needed facilities for graduate programs.

Center for Intelligent Machines (1985)

With a grant from the Québec Ministère de l’Enseignement Supérieur et de la Science, four researchers – Martin Levin, Steve Zucker, Pierre Bélanger, and George Zames (BEng Engineering Physics 1954)– form McRCIM (the McGill Research Centre for Intelligent Machines), now known as the Centre for Intelligent Machines, to study intelligent systems. CIM seeks to advance the state of knowledge in such domains as robotics, automation, artificial intelligence, computer vision, systems and control theory, and speech recognition.

The M.H. Wong Building Reaches Completion (1997)

The new M.H. Wong Building – the first new major academic construction on McGill's downtown campus in almost 20 years – is erected around the Foster Radiation Laboratory (built in 1948). The building, which became the new home of the Departments of Chemical and Mining, Metals, and Materials Engineering cost close to $34 million, $12 million of which came from private donations. The largest of these was a gift of $8 million from the family and friends of the late Man Hung (Jimmy) Wong (BArch 1981). Another anonymous donor from Hong Kong contributed $1.9 million in honour of the late Chemical Engineering professor J.B. Philips.

=== 2000–Present ===
Philanthropist Lorne Trottier Makes Transformative Gift (2000)

Quebec entrepreneur Lorne Trottier announced a gift of $5 million to help build a new Information Technology undergraduate teaching facility at McGill, estimated at a cost of $17 million. The government of Quebec announced that it will provide $7 million to complete the Lorne M. Trottier Building, prompting Trottier to double his gift to $10 million. In 2003, the Lorne M. Trottier Building opened in September. The building houses six floors of advanced teaching laboratories, interactive learning rooms and meeting spaces and is equipped with all of the latest high-tech equipment.

School of Architecture Receives Landmark Gift (2017)

Following a donation from McGill alumnus Peter Guo-hua Fu, the School of Architecture was renamed the Peter Guo-hua Fu School of Architecture. The donation supports architectural education and research at McGill and established the Peter Guo-hua Fu Fellowships. The fellowships are awarded on the basis of academic merit to graduate students entering or enrolled in the School, with preference given to citizens of China.

== Departments and Schools ==
=== Department of Civil Engineering and Applied Mechanics ===
The Department of Civil Engineering and Applied Mechanics (est. 1871) offers programs at the undergraduate and graduate levels. The Department currently has twenty-two full-time faculty members. In addition, the department enjoyed great relations with corporate partners and has many Faculty Lecturers, Associate Professors, and researchers working with students in the department. The Department of Civil Engineering and Applied Mechanics has consistently ranked in the top hundred Civil Engineering schools worldwide and top 3 in Canada.

There are approximately four hundred undergraduate and eighty graduate students in the department, of whom over half are women and over one-third are from outside Canada as of 2018. Broad programs of study are available that offer specialized courses in all areas of civil engineering. Facilities include state-of-the-art teaching, research, and computing laboratories.

=== Department of Mining and Materials Engineering ===
Established in 1871, the mining engineering program is the oldest in Canada, and oldest of its kind in North America. In the mid 1960s mining engineering at universities in Canada was suffering. Toronto closed its school; McGill had only one undergraduate student and its Professor of Mining was due to retire. In 1964 John Ross Bradfield, Chairman of Noranda Inc., was asked to form a committee to study and resolve the problem. The result was the raising of funds to help finance a Chair of Mining at McGill and to persuade Professor Frank T. M. White to come from the University of Queensland in Australia to take the position of Chairman of the Department of Mining Engineering and Applied Geophysics. Professor White initiated a program that graduated a large cohort of postgraduate engineers, many of whom served to rebuild the educational capacity of mining throughout Canada. This, together with the contribution that he made in promoting mining education, resolved the crisis. Professor White died in 1971; McGill University and the Canadian Mineral Industry Education Foundation set up an award, the F.T.M.White Scholarship, to honour him for his outstanding contribution to mining education in Canada.

=== Department of Chemical Engineering ===
Over one hundred years of chemical engineering at McGill has evolved through several distinct stages. The chemical engineering curriculum, established at McGill in 1908, produced its first bachelor's degree graduate in 1911. Today, collectively, 17 members of the academic staff conduct research programs in almost all areas of modern chemical engineering, drawing upon theoretical, computational and experimental methodologies.

=== Department of Electrical & Computer Engineering (ECE) ===
The department of Electrical & Computer Engineering is located in McGill's downtown Montreal campus with a student body of 900 undergraduate students, 350 graduate students, 20 staff members and 40 faculty members. ECE offers three undergraduate degrees in the areas of Electrical (including Honours), Computer and Software Engineering, all accredited by the Canadian Engineering Accreditation Board (CEAB).

=== Department of Bioengineering ===
Established in 2012, the Department of Bioengineering is the newest department to join McGill University's Faculty of Engineering. McGill researchers from nearly all Faculty units, including seven Canada Research Chairs and many colleagues in the Faculties of Medicine, Science, and Agriculture and Environmental Sciences are actively involved in various areas of Bioengineering. Within the Department, the faculty are focusing on three major directions: biological materials and mechanics; bio molecular and cellular engineering; and biomedical, diagnostics and high throughput screening.

=== Department of Mechanical Engineering ===
The department of Mechanical Engineering is located in McGill's main downtown Montreal campus and is one of the primary engineering departments.

=== School of Urban Planning ===
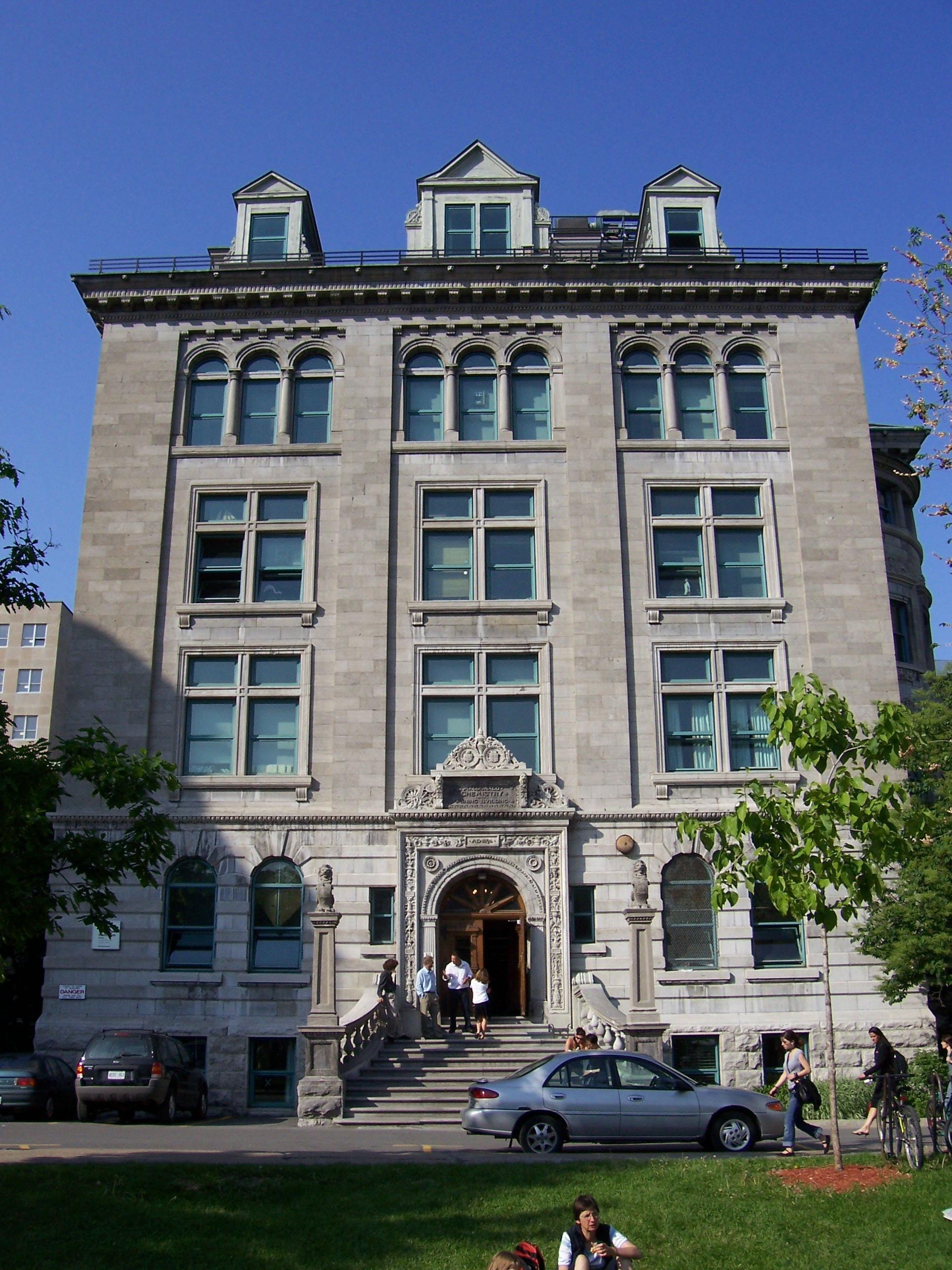
The Macdonald-Harrington Building, named in honor of William Christopher Macdonald. Since 1987, the Schools of Architecture and Urban Planning have been housed in the Macdonald-Harrington Building, which was originally constructed in 1896 by Sir Andrew Taylor to accommodate the Departments of Chemistry and Mining by 1896. The building was renovated for Architecture and Urban Planning by architects Ray Affleck and Arcop Associates in 1987.

McGill was the first university in Canada to offer a full-time program in urban planning. An interdisciplinary program through which students combined a master's degree in their original field was combined with urban planning was established in 1947. An autonomous program was established in 1972. In 1976, the School of Urban Planning was established as a unit within the Faculty of Engineering.

The School offers three Master of Urban Planning programs (a Core Program, with a concentration in Transportation Planning, and with a Concentration in Urban Design) and a Ph.D. in Urban Planning, Policy, and Design program. Major research areas include the Community-University Research Alliance (CURA), Transportation Research at McGill (TRAM), and Whole-corridor Urban Design Strategies (WCUDS).

=== Peter Guo-hua Fu School of Architecture ===
Founded in 1896, McGill's School of Architecture is among the oldest architecture schools in North America, offering professional and post-professional programs from undergraduate through to PhD levels. The School has established an international reputation and a record of producing leading professionals and researchers, with McGill alumni practicing and teaching in firms and institutions across the nation and the globe. It is housed in the Macdonald-Harrington Building, designed by Montreal architect Andrew Taylor. The School of Architecture has produced renowned architects, including Arthur Erickson, Moshe Safdie, Melvin Charney, Raymond Affleck, Catherine Wisnicki, Blanche van Ginkel, Witold Rybczynski, and Raymond Moriyama; leading Montreal-based architects such as Howard Davies and Anne Cormier of Atelier Big City and Annie Lebel of In Situ; Julia Gerzovitz and Alain Founier of EVOQ, Danny Pearl and Mark Poddubuik of L’OEUF as well as contemporary international architects such as Adam Caruso (London), Amale Andraos (Work Architecture, New York), Eric Bunge (nArchitects, New York), and Todd Saunders (Bergen, Norway).

On 26 September 2017, the School was renamed the Peter Guo-hua Fu School of Architecture following a $12 million gift from Chinese architect and McGill graduate Peter Fu.

== Institutes ==
=== Institute for the Public Life of Arts and Ideas (IPLAI) ===
IPLAI (Institute for the Public Life of Arts and Ideas) is a collaboration among six faculties across McGill, two schools and the McGill Libraries.

=== McGill Institute for Aerospace Engineering (MIAE) ===
MIAE is an initiative of the Lorne Trottier Chair in Aerospace Engineering to foster interest in Aerospace Engineering among undergraduate and graduate students and awareness of the multi-disciplinary and multi-cultural environment in which they may work as future engineers working in the Aerospace Industry. Students accepted into the Institute will be given the opportunity to participate in a number of 500 to 1000 hours Research Projects proposed by the Aerospace Companies.

=== McGill Institute for Advance Materials (MIAM) ===
McGill Institute for Advance Materials was established by the Faculties of Science and Engineering for research into all forms of advanced materials.

== Buildings and laboratories ==
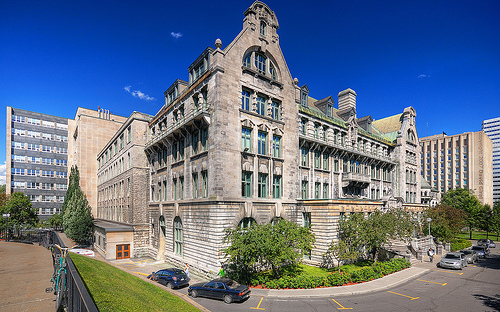
Macdonald Engineering Building

=== Macdonald Building ===
When the Arts Building was becoming overcrowded in the 1890s as enrollment climbed; new faculties were added to the University Campus. The Applied Science Faculty, (which was the term used for Engineering at that time), relocated in 1893 to two new buildings. One was donated by Thomas Workman and the other by Sir William Macdonald, one of McGill's most generous benefactors.

=== Macdonald-Harrington Building ===
The Macdonald Chemistry Building, recently renamed the Macdonald-Harrington Building after its first Chemistry professor, Bernard Harrington, was built between 1896 and 1897 and was one of the many donations made to the University by Sir William Macdonald. Located in the Macdonald-Harrington Building are: Engineering Micro-computing Facilities; School of Architecture; School of Urban Planning.

=== M. H. Wong Building ===
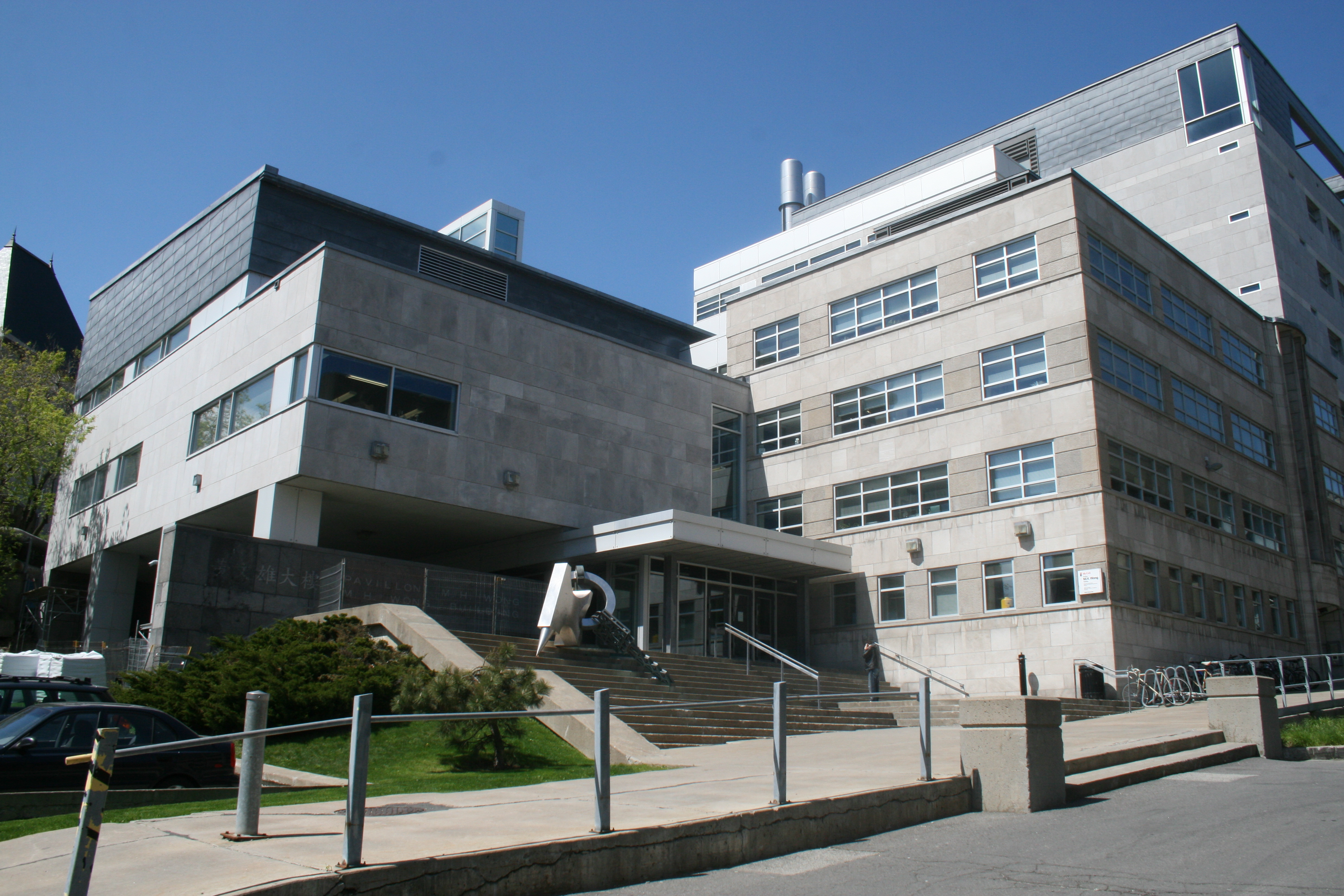
M. H. Wong Engineering Building

This edifice, donated by Mr. Wong, an alumnus of McGill's School of Architecture, preserves the atmosphere of the campus both in its size and in its materials. It is composed of two sections, the older Foster section which consists of four storeys, and a new wing north of Foster which adds another six storeys to the whole. The Foster Wing, which will be used as offices, has had classrooms and labs added to both its west side and the top of the building, designated for Metallurgical Engineering labs. The new wing is used for Chemical Engineering labs.

=== McConnell Engineering Building ===
The McConnell Engineering Building was donated to McGill in 1959 by John W. McConnell, a major benefactor of the University since 1911 and one of its Governors from 1928 until 1958. In the period after World War II when all of the Engineering Faculties were greatly expanding, this nine-storey structure doubled the number of classrooms, lecture rooms, and offices available for use by the above faculties.

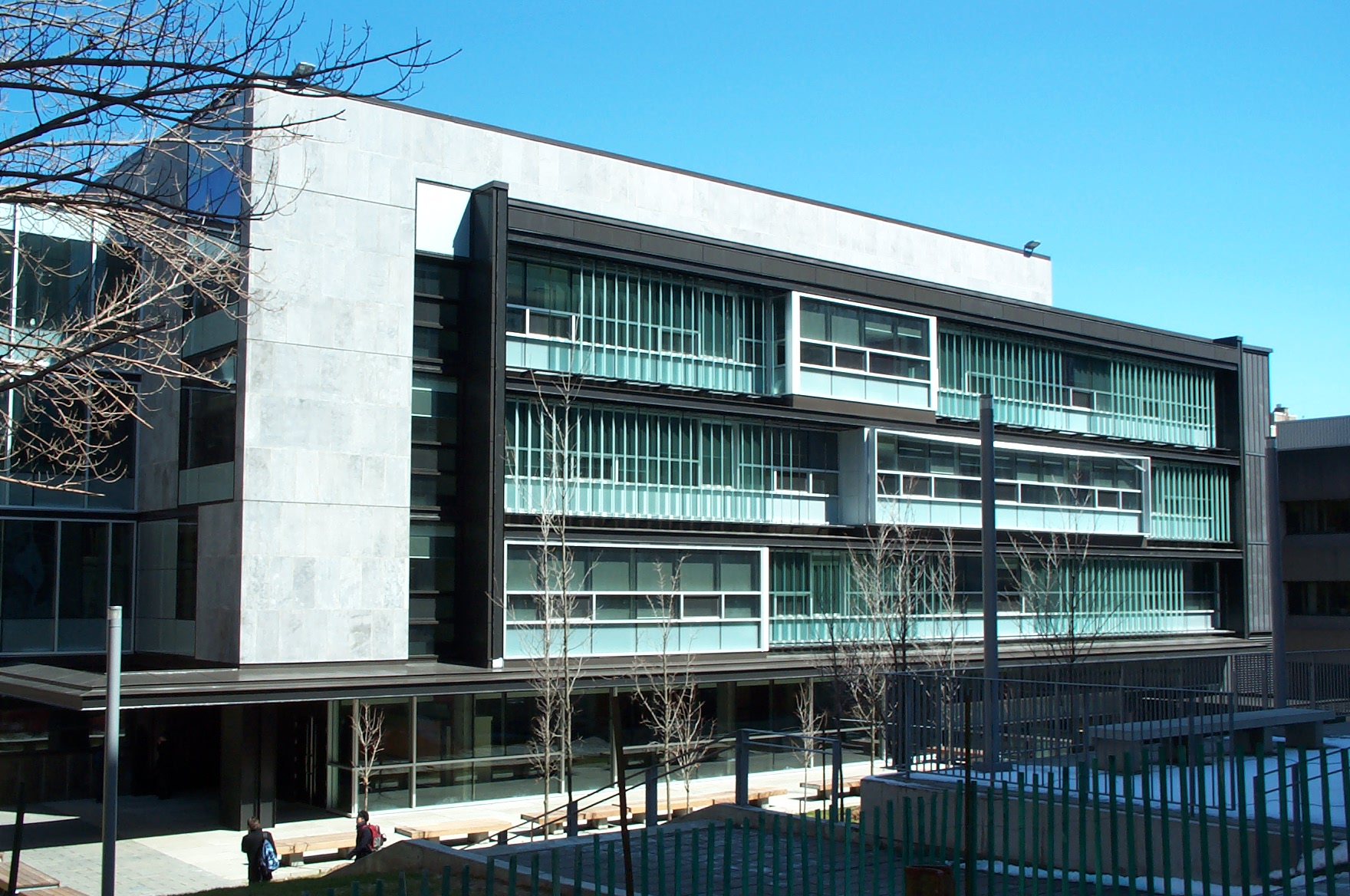
Lorne M. Trottier Engineering Building

=== Frank Dawson Adams Building ===
The Physical Sciences Centre was renamed the "Frank Dawson Adams Building" after a professor of Geology who was the first chairman of Graduate Studies, and also served as Vice Principal from 1920 to 1924. The building was completed in October 1951.

=== Lorne M. Trottier Building ===
The Lorne M. Trottier Building was inaugurated on March 26, 2004. This building is part of the TechSquare and will allow the University to expand its popular electrical engineering, computer science and telecommunications programs.

== Student life ==
=== Engineering Undergraduate Society of McGill University (EUS) ===
The Engineering Undergraduate Society (EUS) is the representative body of the undergraduate students of engineering at McGill University. The EUS is a full-fledged not-for-profit organization that is financially independent from McGill.

=== Architecture Students Association (ASA) ===
Architecture Students Association (ASA) is a non-profit student-run society within the School of Architecture. The society serves as an organizational body for student activities and affairs, a voice for students in academic and university issues at McGill, and a link between other schools of architecture across the country.

== Notable alumni ==
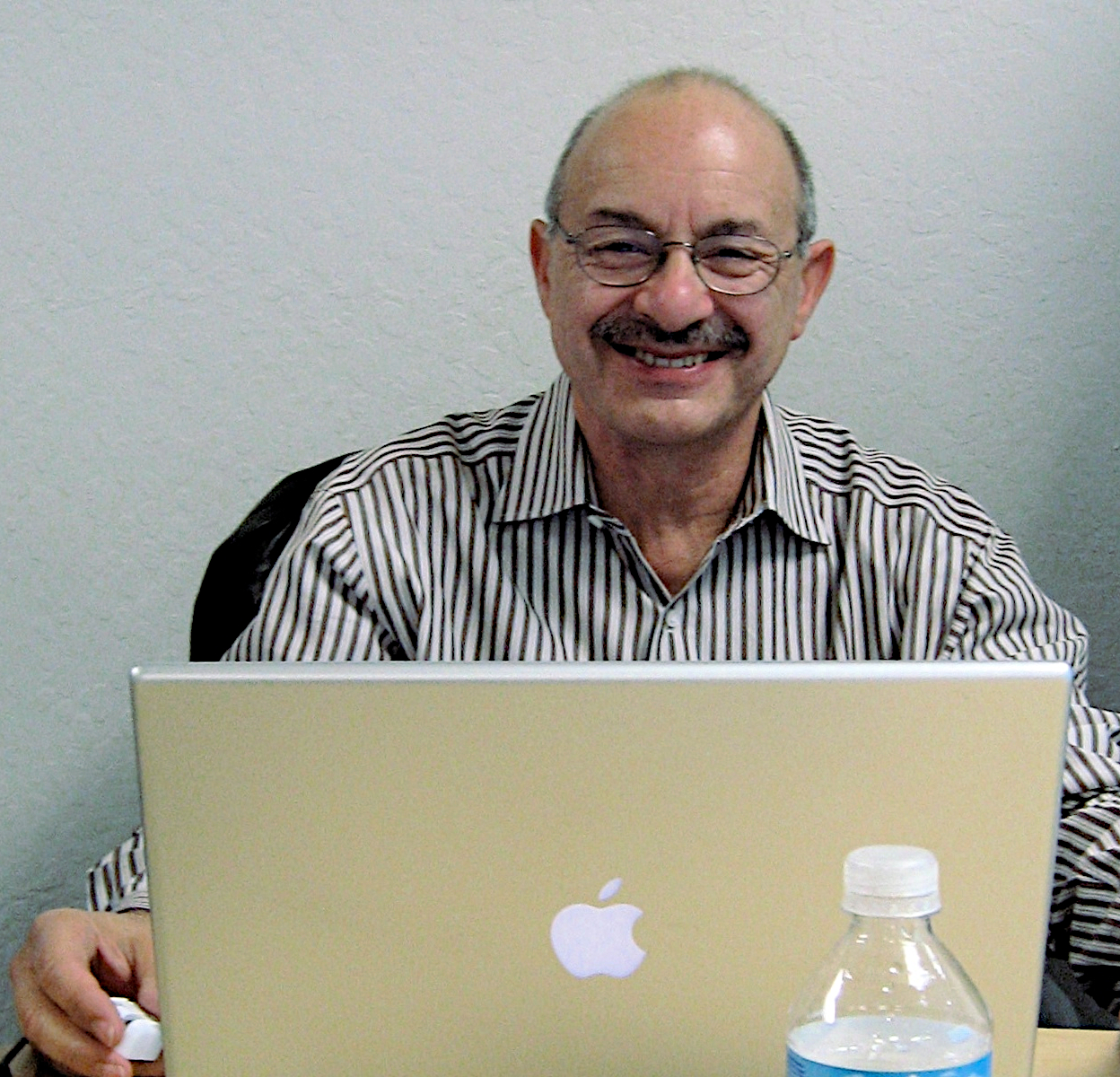
Les Vadasz, Founding member of Intel Corporation

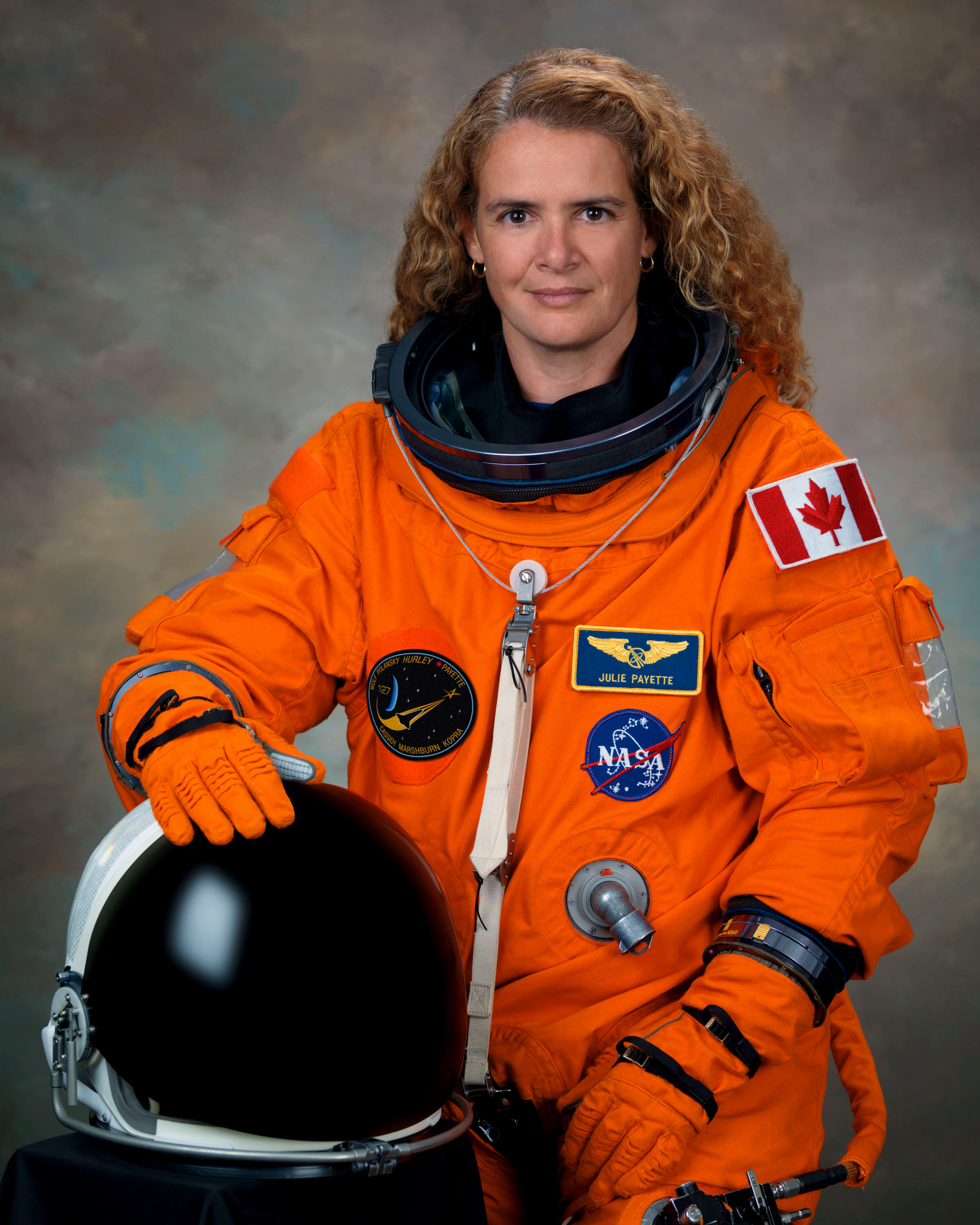
Julie Payette, former Chief Astronaut for the Canadian Space Agency and former Governor General of Canada.

=== Current and Former Faculty ===
- Monty Newborn – former chairman of the Computer Chess Committee of the Association for Computing Machinery, professor emeritus of computer science
- Gerald Bull – developed long-range artillery
- Abdolhamid Akbarzadeh Shafaroudi – assistant professor in machine design, bioresource engineering, and mechanical engineering

=== Engineers ===
- Noubar Afeyan (BEng'83) – Billionaire scientific entrepreneur, Co-founder of Moderna
- Matt Colleyer (MEng '96) – Skat musician of Planet Smashers and founder of Stomp Records
- Wael Sawan CEO of Shell plc
- Jake Eberts (BEng'62) – Award-winning movie producer and film financier
- Peyush Bansal, founder and CEO of Lenskart
- Bruce Firestone (BEng'71) – real estate magnate and founder of the NHL's Ottawa Senators and minority owner of the CFL's Ottawa Rough Riders
- Val Fitch (BEng'48, DSc'87) – American nuclear physicist and co-recipient of the 1980 Nobel Prize in Physics
- Steven G Arless – Canadian entrepreneur in the biomedical technology industry
- Alphonse Paré – Canadian mining engineer of the Timmins family
- George Hodgson (BEng 1916) – Canadian Olympic swimmer and first Canadian to win two Olympic gold medals
- Dr. Jeffrey Karp (BEng'99) –Inventor of gecko-tape
- Kate McGarrigle (BEng) – Canadian folk music singer-songwriter
- Henry Mintzberg (BEng'61) – Acclaimed management thinker, author and iconoclast
- Paul Moller Canadian engineer, developed the Moller Skycar
- James Campbell Clouston – Canadian officer in the British Royal Navy, who acted as pier-master during the Dunkirk evacuation
- Julie Payette (BEng'86, DSc’03) – Former Chief Astronaut for the Canadian Space Agency and former Governor General of Canada.
- Richard Birdsall Rogers (BEng’1878) – Creator of the Peterborough Lift Lock
- Selim Akl (PhD 1978) – professor at Queen's University in the Queen's School of Computing
- Lorne Trottier (BEng'70, MEng'73) – Leading philanthropist and co-founder of Matrox
- George Zames (BEng'54) – Polish-Canadian control theorist
- Les Vadasz (BEng'61) – Founding member of Intel Corporation
- Jonathan Kay (BEng, MEng) – attorney and newspaper editor
- William-Henry Gauvin (BEng 1941, MEng 1942, and PhD 1945) – attorney and newspaper editor
- Robert Bell (BEng) – prominent Canadian geologist, named over 3,000 geographical features
- Ian Campbell, 12th Duke of Argyll (BEng) – Scottish peer and Chief of Clan Campbell
- Ahmed Nazif (PhD Eng) – Prime Minister of Egypt
- Martine Ouellet (BEng 1992) – Canadian politician who served as leader of the Bloc Québécois
- Livio De Simone (BEng’57) – Former CEO and chairman of 3M Corporation
- Alexandre Trudeau – filmmaker, journalist, founding member of the Pierre Elliott Trudeau Foundation
- Bernard P. Zeigler – academic, inventor of Discrete Event System Specification (DEVS)
- Leslie L. Vadász – American engineer, one of the founding members of Intel Corporation
- Karim Habib (Mech. Eng)– automotive designer, executive vice president and Chief of Kia Global Design
- Alan Emtage – Bajan-Canadian computer scientist who conceived and implemented the first version of Archie

=== Architects ===
- Adam Caruso (BArch 1986) – co-founder of Caruso St John, Stirling Prize winner
- Alina Payne (BArch 1977) – professor of History of Art and Architecture at Harvard University
- Amale Andraos (BArch 1996) – founder of New York-based architecture firm WORKac
- Arthur Erickson (BArch 1950) – architect of Robson Square, the Canadian Embassy and Roy Thompson Hall
- Blanche van Ginkel (BArch 1945) – first woman to head a faculty of architecture in Canada and be awarded a fellowship by the RAIC
- Catherine Mary Wisnicki (B. Arch. 1943) – first woman architecture graduate at McGill and one of the first women registered architects in Canada
- Dimitri Dimakopoulos (BArch 1955) – of Affleck, Desbarats, Dimakopoulos, Lebensold, Sise, designed Place Ville-Marie and 1000 de La Gauchetiere
- Dorice Walford (MArch 1958) – one of the first Canadian women in architecture to specialize in designing buildings for institutions
- Frances Bronet (BSc[Arch] 1977, BArch 1978) – president of the Pratt Institute in Brooklyn, New York
- Gavin Affleck (BArch 1985) – architect and son of Ray Affleck
- Gerald Sheff (BArch 1964) – founder of Gluskin Sheff + Associates Inc. and benefactor of the Gluskin Sheff Travel Scholarship at McGill
- Gregory Henriquez (MArch History & Theory program 1988) – Vancouver-based architect
- Demetri Terzopoulos (MArch 1978) – Greek-Canadian-American computer scientist and entrepreneur, Henry Samueli School of Engineering and Applied Science at the University of California, Los Angeles
- Guy Desbarats (BArch 1948) – co-founder of Montreal-based architectural firm Arcop
- Harold Lea Fetherstonhaugh (BArch 1909) – architect of many buildings on McGill's campus, including Douglas Hall and William and Henry Birks Building
- Harry Mayerovitch (BArch 1933) – architect, artist and cartoonist
- Janet Leys Shaw Mactavish (BArch 1947) – architect of the McIntyre Medical Sciences Building at McGill
- John Campbell Merrett (BArch 1931) – staff architect for Canadian National Railway and town planner of Pointe-Claire, Quebec
- Karl Fischer (BSc[Arch] 1971, BArch 1972) – New York-based architect and benefactor of the Karl Fischer Scholarship at McGill
- Lucien Lagrange (BArch 1972) – former partner at Skidmore, Owings & Merrill and founder of Lucien Lagrange & Associates
- Ludger Lemieux – architect known for his Art Deco buildings in Montreal, notably Atwater Market
- Manon Asselin (BSc[Arch] 1990, BArch 1992, MArch 2001) – co-founder of Atelier TAG, 2007 Prix de Rome winner
- Maxwell M. Kalman (BArch 1931) – designed over 1,100 projects in Quebec, including Canada's first shopping centre
- Dimitri Dimakopoulos (BArch 1955) – notable Greek-Canadian architect
- Raymond Yong – notable Singaporean-Canadian architect
- Melvin Charney (BArch 1958) – architect known for designing the sculpture garden at the Canadian Centre for Architecture
- Moshe Safdie (MArch 1961) – architect of Habitat 67, Marina Bay Sands, Jewel Changi Airport and the Montreal Museum of Fine Arts
- Peter Oberlander (BArch 1945) – architect and Canada's first professor of Urban and Regional Planning
- Raymond Affleck (BArch 1947) – co-founder of Arcop
- Raymond Moriyama (MArch 1957) – architect of Ottawa City Hall, Bata Shoe Museum and Scarborough City Centre
- René Menkès (BArch 1955) – co-founder of WZMH Architects, architect of CN Tower
- Robert John Pratt (BArch 1933) – politician and architect
- Robert Jolicoeur, landscape architect and designer of FEI equestrian show jumping courses
- Robert Libman (BArch 1985) – politician and architect
- Robert Schofield Morris (BArch 1923) – architect and RIBA Gold Medal recipient
- Ted Remerowski (BSc[Arch] 1970) – film producer
- Hazen Sise (transferred) – co-founder of Affleck, Desbarats, Dimakopoulos, Lebensold, Sise
- Witold Rybczynski (BArch 1966, MArch 1972, DSc 2002) – Canadian-American architectural writer/researcher
