= Dorice Constance Brown Walford =

Canadian architect

Dorice Constance Brown Walford (born April 17, 1924) is a Canadian architect, one of the first Canadian women in that profession to specialize in designing buildings for institutions.

Dorice Constance Brown was born on April 17, 1924 in Moose Jaw, Saskatchewan and received a BArch from the University of Manitoba and a MArch from McGill University. Her graduate thesis, finished in August 1958, was titled Tendencies in the Evolution of the Centres of Canadian Cities. Walford worked in the office of Le Corbusier and then in the Office of Foreign Buildings Operations in Paris. She also worked in Skidmore, Owings & Merrill's office in Paris. After working in London for two years, she returned to Montreal in 1955. There she worked for the firm Marshall & Merrett. She was a friend and colleague of Janet Leys Shaw Mactavish.

Walford worked with Moshe Safdie on Habitat 67 and the Bell Telephone Building at Expo 67. Other projects include:

- the chemistry building at Queen's University
- the McIntyre Medical Sciences Building at McGill University
- the Montreal Children's Hospital
- the Allan Memorial Institute

She married Harvey Walford.

She was a fellow of the Royal Architectural Institute of Canada; she was the first women officer of the Institute's College of Fellows, serving as registrar for three years. Walford was also a member of the Royal Institute of British Architects, the Ordre des architectes du Québec, the Architectural Institute of British Columbia, the Canadian Institute of Planners and the Ontario Association of Architects.

Walford turned 100 on April 17, 2024.
