= Anne-Marie Croteau =

Canadian information technology professor

- Born: 1964 (age 60–61); Arthabaska County, Quebec, Canada
- Spouse: Louis Gagnon

Academic background
- Education: BSc, Actuarial Mathematics, Concordia University; MSc, BComm, MIS, HEC Montréal; PhD, Management Information Systems, 1998, Université Laval
- Thesis: Harmonisation du déploiement technologique avec la stratégie d'affaires, augmentation de la performance organisationelle (1998)
- Website: John Molson School of Business; Concordia University

Anne-Marie Croteau (born 1964) is a Canadian information technology professor. Croteau became the first female dean of the John Molson School of Business in June 2017 and is an expert on IT governance, health-care information systems and strategic management of information technology.

== Early life and education ==
Croteau was born in 1964 in Arthabaska County, Quebec to mother Madeleine Aubert and the former mayor of Victoriaville, Jean-Paul Croteau. She remained in Montreal for her education and completed her Bachelor of Science degree in Actuarial Mathematics from Concordia University. Following this, she enrolled at HEC Montréal for a dual Master's degree and Bachelor of Commerce degree and Université Laval for her PhD in Management Information Systems. Upon graduating in 1998, Croteau was the first woman to obtain a PhD in Business Administration with a specialization in Management Information Systems from Université Laval.

== Career ==
Croteau returned to her alma mater, Concordia, in 1997 as an assistant professor of Management Information Systems. Throughout the following decade, she served in various administrative roles including director of the John Molson School of Business (JMSB) Executive MBA Program, director of the Aviation MBA Program, and associate dean of Recruitment and Awards at the School of Graduate Studies. In 2013, Croteau was appointed associate dean of JMSB's External Relations and Business Development. After four years in this role, she became the first female dean of JMSB and received a Méritic award from the Réseau Action TI organization in recognition of her IT leadership and scholarship. In 2019, she was recognized by John Molson Women in Leadership as their Personality Of The Month. Later that year, JMSB became the first business school certified by Women in Governance.

During the COVID-19 pandemic, Croteau was appointed chair of the Business School Association of Canada, a non-profit organization involved with business education. She was also named to the Collège André-Grasset's Board of Directors.

== Personal life ==
Croteau is married and has a son.
