= Brian Merrett =

Canadian photographer (1945–2023)

- Born: July 28, 1945; Saint John, New Brunswick, Canada
- Died: September 21, 2023 (aged 78); North Hatley, Quebec, Canada
- Known for: Photography and architectural activism
- Father: John Campbell Merrett

Brian Jackson Merrett (July 28, 1945 – September 21, 2023) was a Canadian photographer and architectural activist known for his contributions to the preservation of Montreal's architectural heritage. Through his photographs and actions toward saving threatened buildings, he played an important role in the preservation of Montreal's historic structures, including the Shaughnessy House, which later became the Canadian Centre for Architecture, and the Windsor Station. He was one of the founding members of Heritage Montreal, a Canadian non-profit conservation organization.

== Early life ==
Merrett was born on July 28, 1945, in Saint John, New Brunswick, Canada. His father, John Campbell Merrett, was an architect and town planner whose work included the Art Deco–styled interior of the Central Station in Montreal. Merrett grew up in Senneville, a suburb of Montreal. He was introduced to photography at an early age, when he won a 35 mm camera in a contest when he was 12. By his late teens, he was processing and working with black-and-white film. Speaking later of his architect father's role in shaping his interest for photography, Merrett would say, "His eyes shaped mine".

== Career and activism ==
Merrett started his career working as an architectural draftsman before moving over to photography in the 1960s. He started his photography career, training under Lennart Koraen, a commercial photographer. During this time he focused on urban architectural projects. Amongst some of his major works during this period was the 1969 commissioned photography of the restoration of the Bank of Montreal that he did for his father's architectural firm.

During the 1970s, Montreal faced rampant destruction of its historic buildings. The city was coming off the Quiet Revolution and the October Crisis, both bringing along social and cultural upheaval. Brian Merrett became actively involved in various organizations aimed at preserving the city's architectural heritage from large-scale urban infrastructure projects. Some of his popular series from the time included Autoroute Ville-Marie (1969–1972) and In and Around Windsor Station (1972). He played a crucial role in saving the Shaughnessy House, a historic building that once belonged to Canada's railway baron family, was at risk of demolition. His compelling photographs in 1973, of the building's interior convinced Phyllis Lambert, a prominent architect and advocate for architectural causes, to purchase the Shaughnessy mansion in 1974 and transform it into the Canadian Centre for Architecture (CCA). Merrett also worked on campaigns to save other landmarks, including Windsor Station and the Van Horne Mansion. While the Van Horne Mansion was not preserved, it served as a galvanizing force bringing together multiple citizens' groups to preserve the city's heritage. Merrett's work during this period documented threatened buildings and played a crucial role in their preservation. He served as an advocate for preserving older buildings and was a dedicated environmentalist. Earlier in 1972, he had spent more than two months on a photography expedition through Europe with his then wife, Jennifer Harper. The photographs from the period were exhibited as Holiday Pictures of Europe/L’Europe en vacances (1972). The tour was intended to be a grand tour, however, his work stood out for bringing out the odds that modernization was at with urban preservation. He continued to remain active into the 2020 working on an effort to drive awareness to save the 169-year-old Fulford Residence in Montreal from demolition in 2021. The building was later designated as a heritage site and subsequently preserved, a fitting posthumous conservation project resulting from Merrett's photography, combining architectural heritage with social purpose.

Merrett captured photographs for many organizations including Westmount Action Committee, Heritage Montreal, and SOS Montreal. He was also one of the founding members of Heritage Montreal, a Canadian non-profit conservation organization, and its predecessor organization Save Montreal. In his activism focused on urbanism and preservation of heritage buildings, Merrett was among a group of photographer activists that included Clara Gutsche, Melvin Charney, and David Miller.

Through his career, Merrett published several books, collaborating with Dane Lanken and, extensively, François Rémillard, that focused on Montreal's heritage architecture. He also served as the staff photographer at the Montreal Museum of Fine Arts between 1983 and 2001. Merrett donated a portion of his photographic archive to the McCord Museum to preserve his decade-long documentation of Montreal's past. The donation consists of roughly 40,000 negatives, most of which have never been printed or publicly exhibited. These negatives capture a meticulous record of Montreal's evolution, featuring elements that are now lost or significantly altered, and serve as a record of Montreal's transformation over the years.

== Personal life ==
Merrett married Jennifer Harper, also a photographer and daughter of J. Russell Harper, in the 1970s and had a son and a daughter, Toby and Hannah Harper-Merrett. The couple divorced and Merrett later married Lucinda Lyman who had two children from an earlier marriage. In his later years, Merrett spent his time in Montreal and North Hatley, Quebec, often with his grandchildren, and where he actively participated in local causes including activism against a condo development. He was also a member of the Strategic Planning Committee of North Hatley.

Merrett died on September 21, 2023, at his home in North Hatley. He had been diagnosed with amyotrophic lateral sclerosis (ALS) and had lost his ability to speak. He was 78.

Merrett was memorialised in publications by the institutions he was associated with, as well as local and national media, and in a statement in the House of Commons of Canada the 8th of November, 2023, by Member of Parliament Anna Gainey.

== Published works ==
- Rémillard, François; Merrett, Brian (2022). Belles demeures historiques de Québec et de sa région (in French). Les Éditions de l'homme. ISBN 978-2-761954-85-3.
- Rémillard, François; Merrett, Brian (2016). Belles demeures historiques de l'île de Montréal (in French). Les Éditions de l'homme. ISBN 978-2-761944-28-1.
- Lanken, Dane; Merrett, Brian (1993). Montreal movie palaces: great theatres of the golden era, 1884 - 1938. Waterloo, Ontario: Penumbra Press. ISBN 978-0-921254-48-5.
- Brian Merrett: Photographs, Survey 1969-1992. Centre Saidye Bronfman. 1992.
- Rémillard, François; Merrett, Brian (1987). Mansions of the Golden Square Mile, Montreal, 1850-1930. Meridian Press. ISBN 978-2-920417-25-0.

== Gallery ==
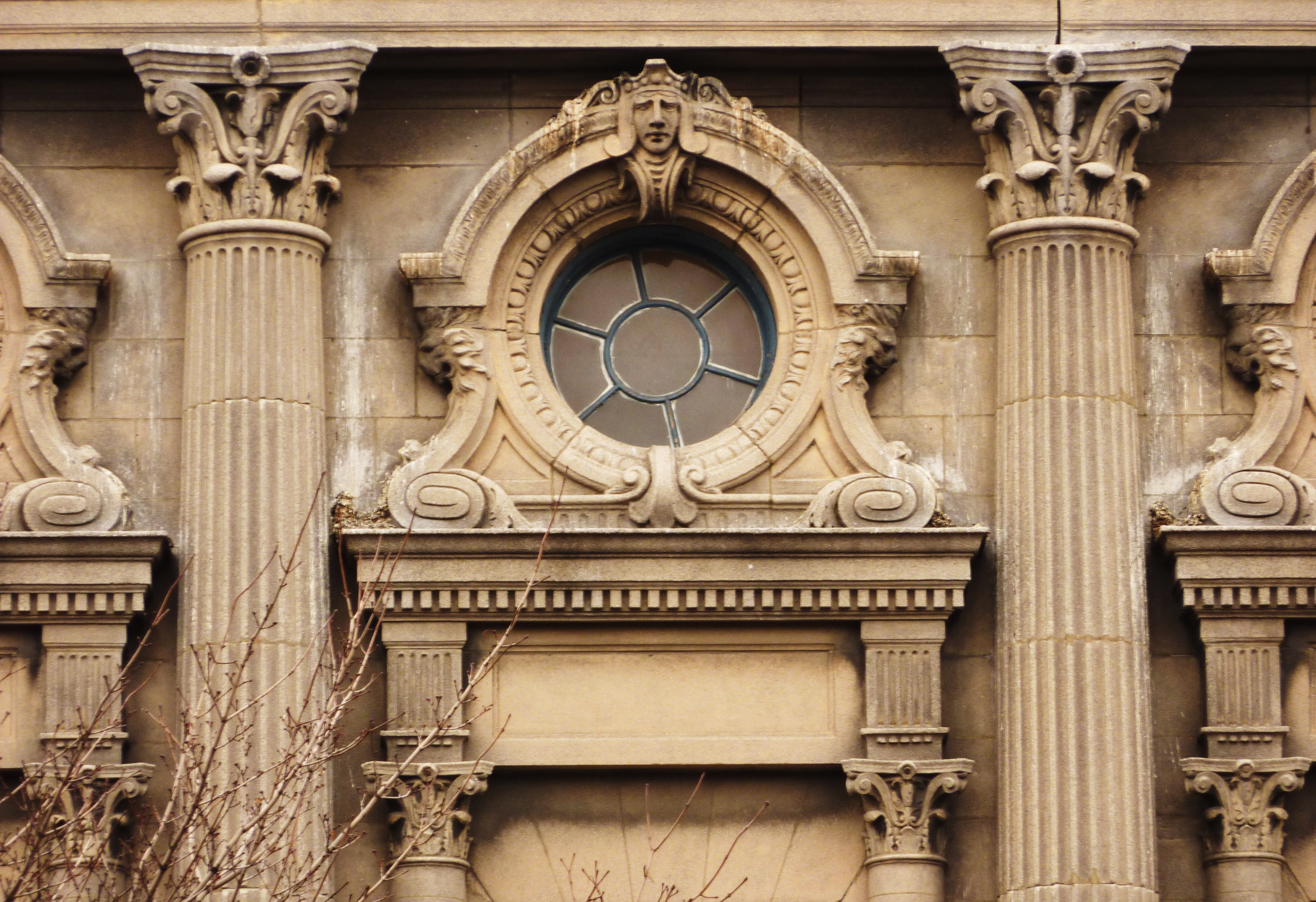
Cinéma Rialto

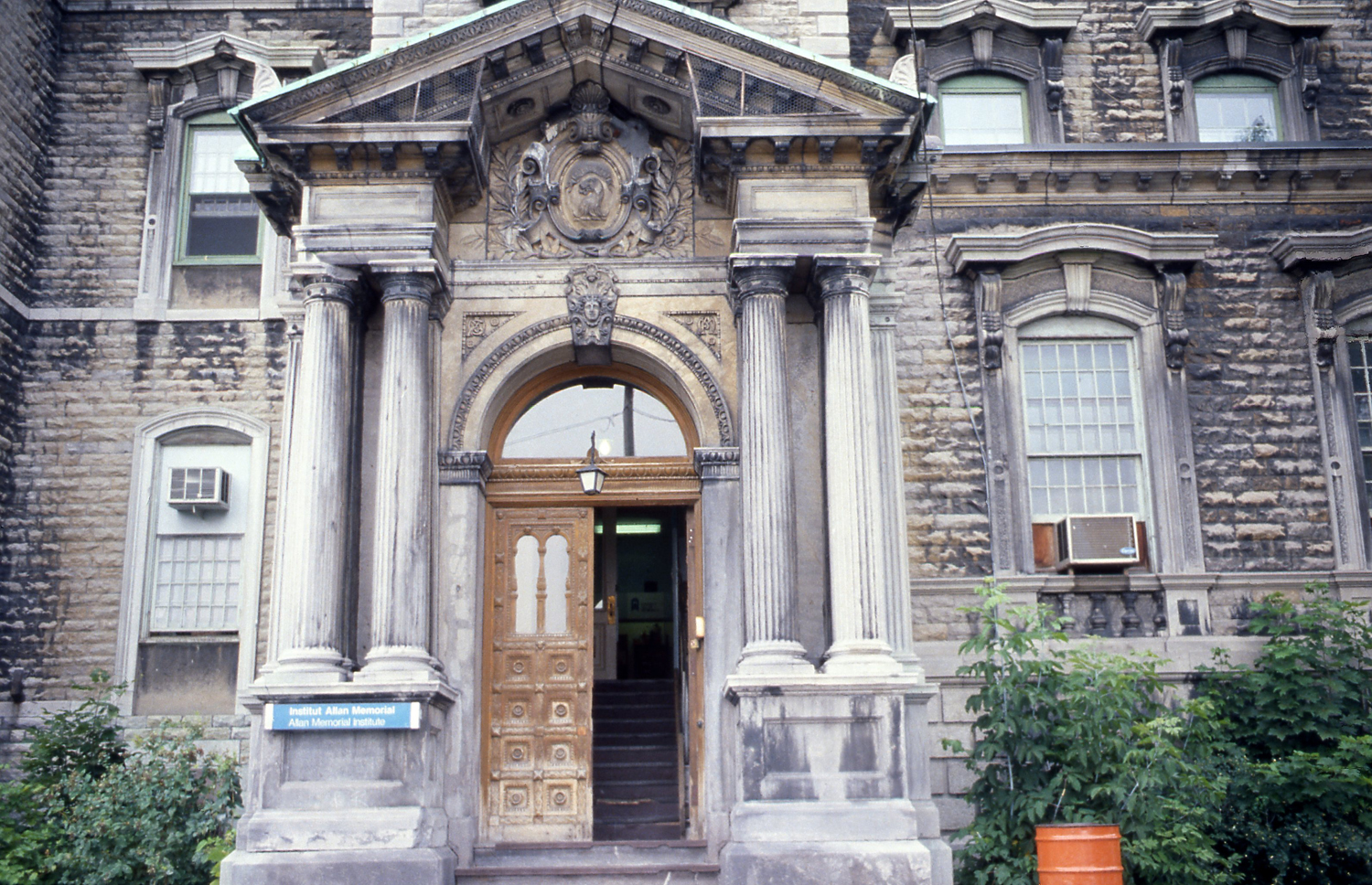
Maison Hugh Allan, 1025, avenue des Pins Ouest, Montréal

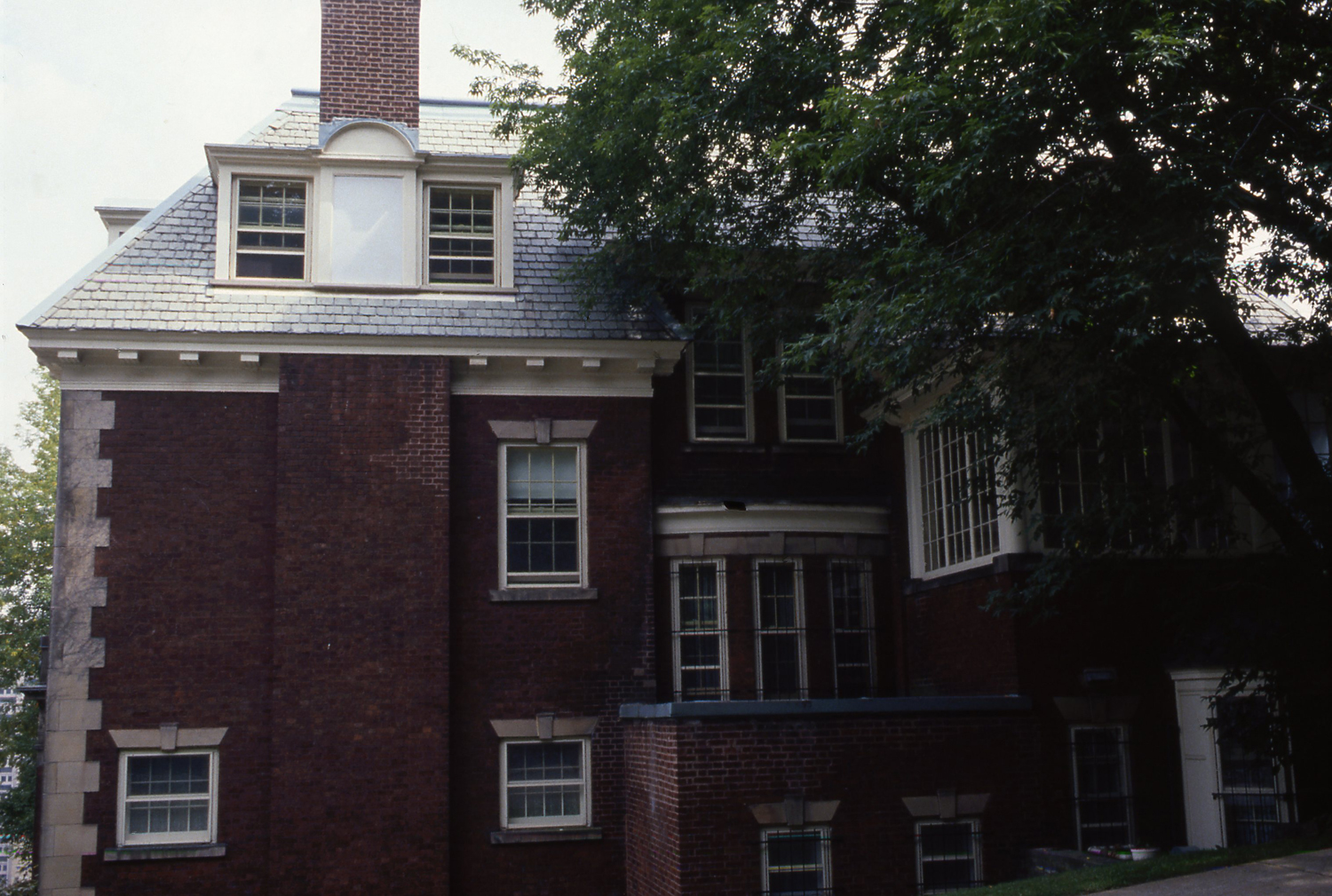
Maison Deakin, 1242, rue Redpath-Crescent

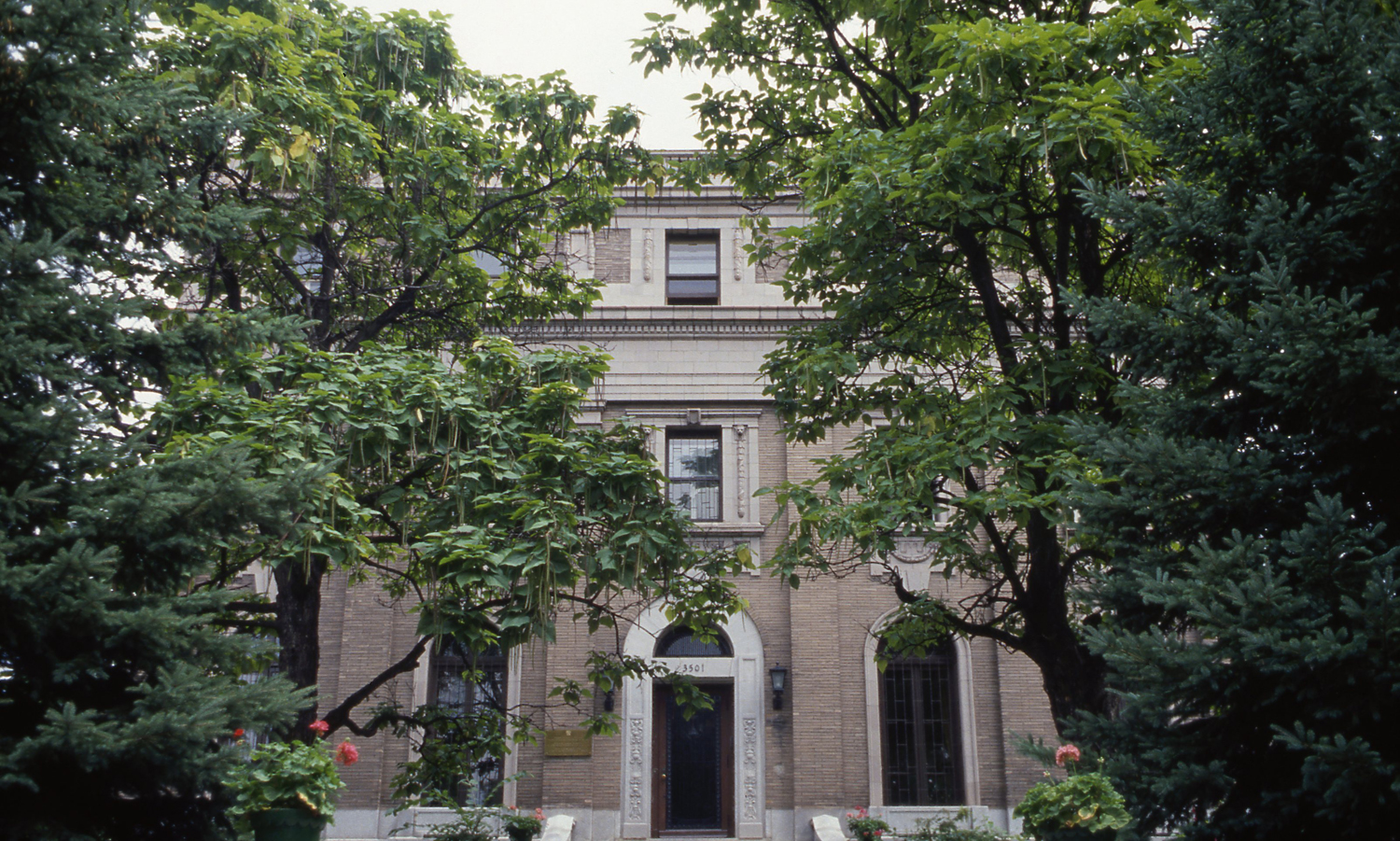
Maison Wilson, 3501, avenue du Musée,

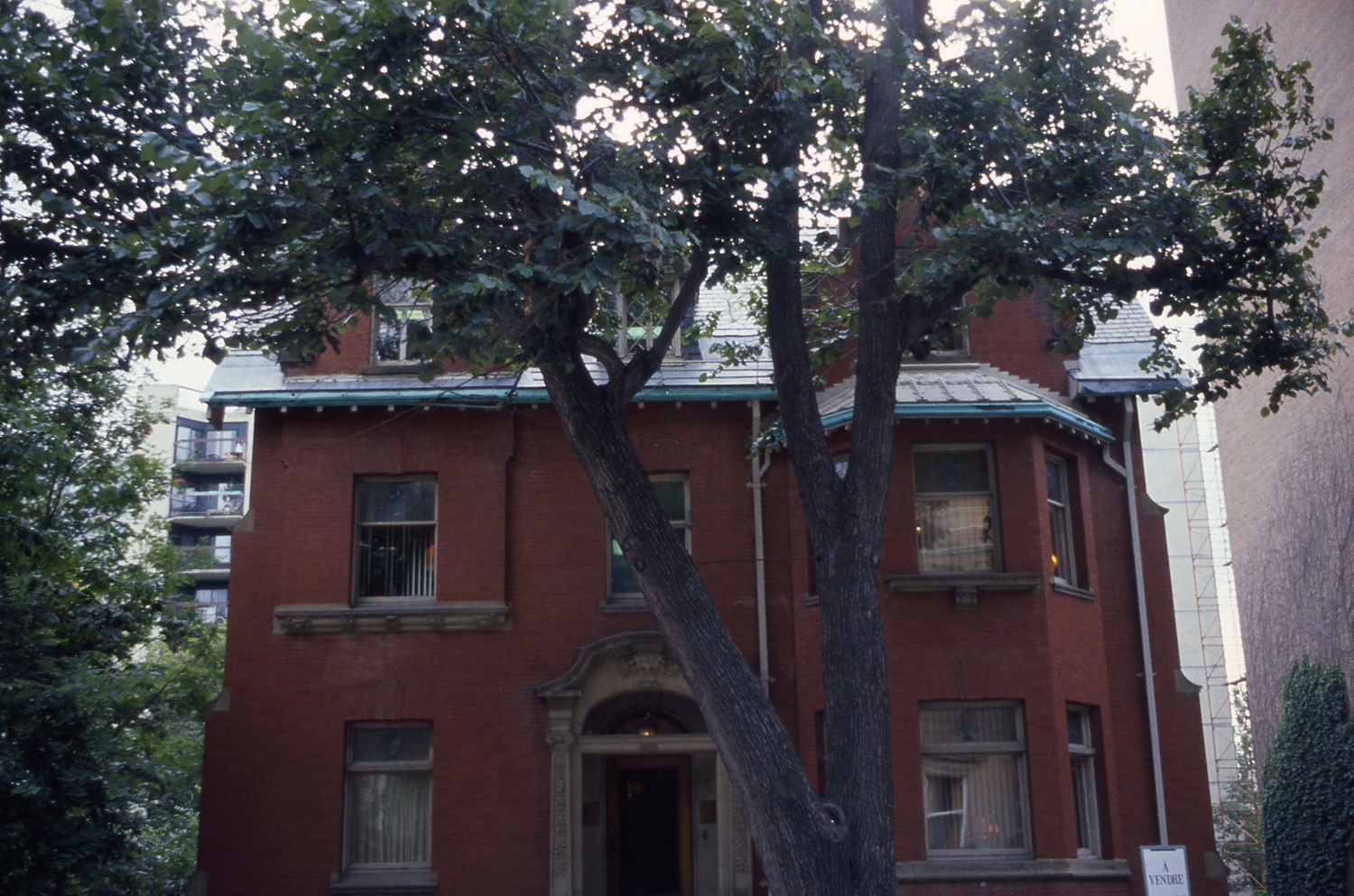
Maison Stearns, 1514, avenue du Docteur-Penfield

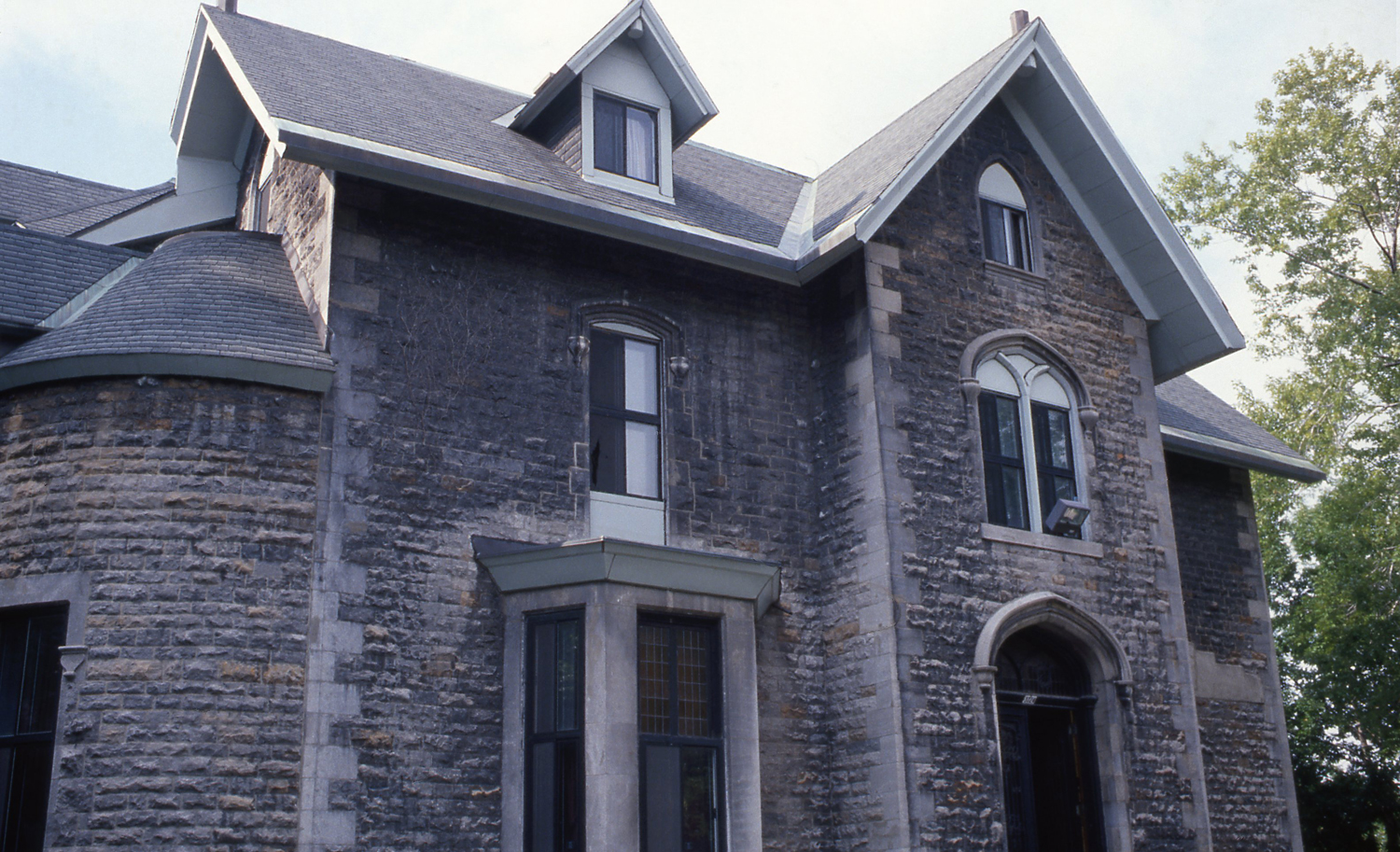
Maison Duggan, 3724, rue McTavish

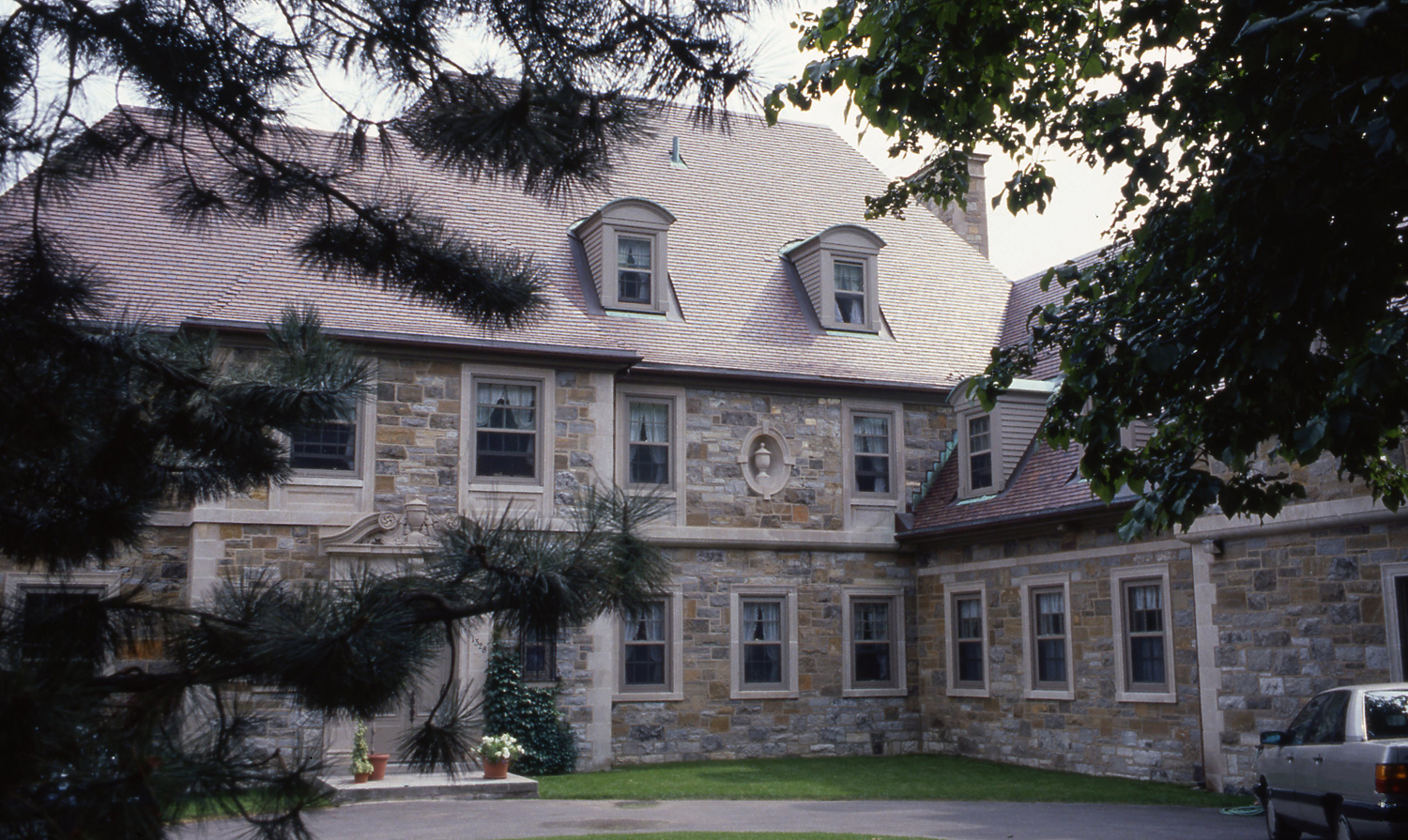
Maison Molson, 1328, rue Redpath-Crescent
