= John Molson School of Business =

Business school in Montreal, Quebec, Canada

Coordinates: 45.497406°N 73.577102°W

- École de gestion John-Molson
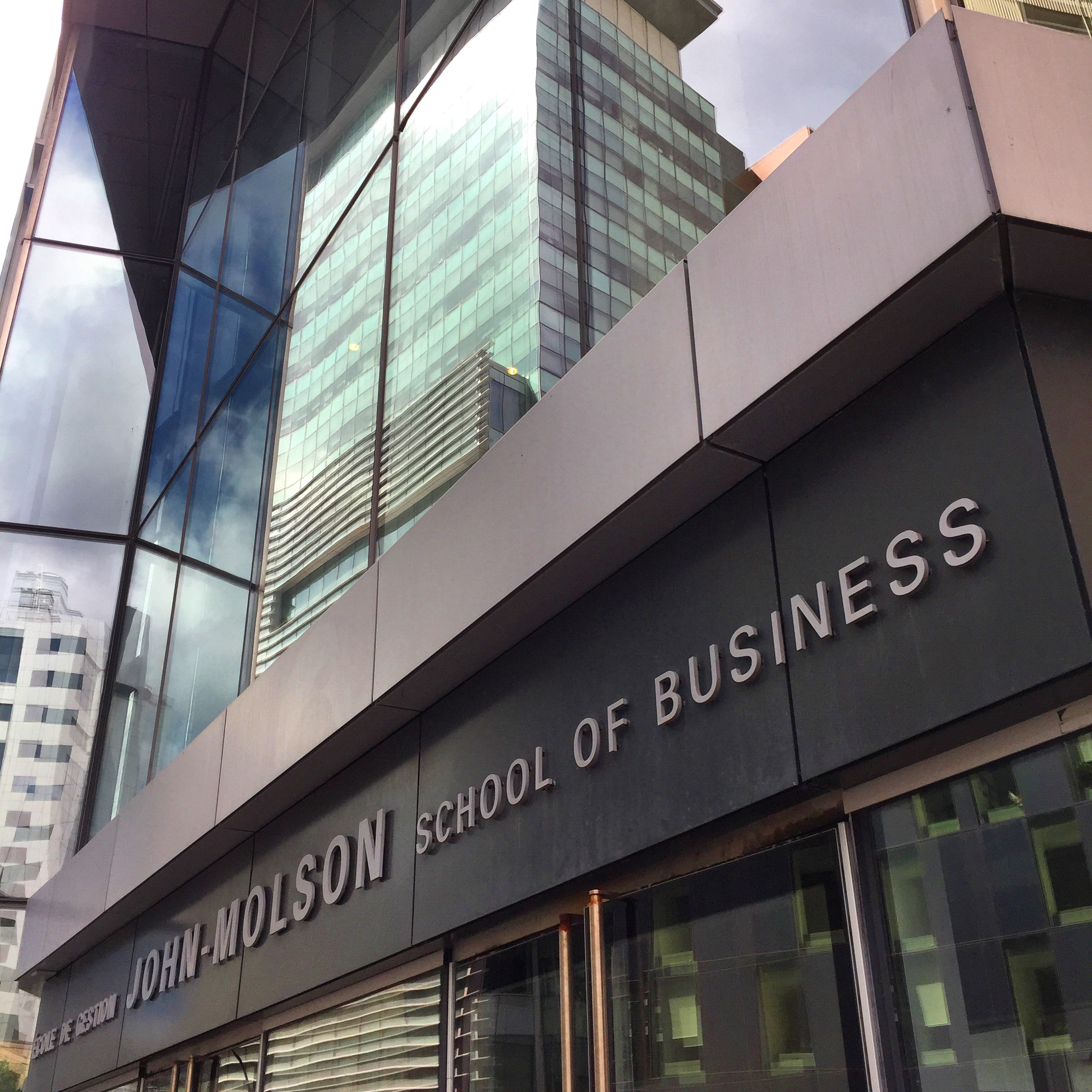
- Former names: Faculty of Commerce and Administration
- Type: Public Business school
- Established: 1963 (as Faculty of Commerce and Administration, part of Sir George Williams University)
- Parent institution: Concordia University
- Affiliations: AACSB, EQUIS, AMBDA Development Network, Women in Governance
- Dean: Anne-Marie Croteau
- Faculty: 170 (full-time)
- Students: 10,361
- Undergraduates: 8,885
- Postgraduates: 1,476
- Location: Montreal, QC, Canada
- Campus: Urban
- Alumni: 68,143
- Website: Official Website

The John Molson School of Business (JMSB) is the business school of Concordia University, located in Montreal, Quebec, Canada.

The school's origins date back to 1963 with the founding of the Faculty of Commerce and Administration at Sir George Williams University, which later merged with Loyola College in 1974 to form Concordia University. It was renamed in 2000 following a $20 million donation from the Molson family.

Situated in downtown Montreal's Quartier Concordia, the school offers undergraduate, graduate, and executive business programs to a student body of over 10,000. It is accredited by the AACSB and the European Quality Improvement System (EQUIS).

== History ==
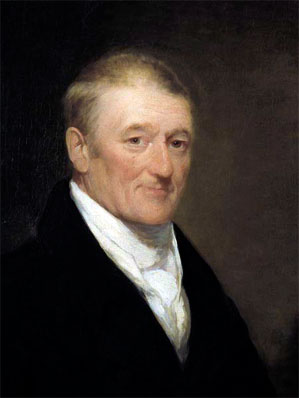
John Molson (1763-1836)

In November 2000, the faculty was renamed the John Molson School of Business following a $20 million donation from the Molson family. The name honors John Molson (1763-1836), the entrepreneur who founded the Molson Brewing Company in Montreal.

The donation assisted in the construction of the John Molson Building, a 15-story, LEED Silver-certified facility completed in 2009. Prior to its construction, the school's departments and facilities were dispersed across multiple buildings in the downtown campus.

== Academics ==
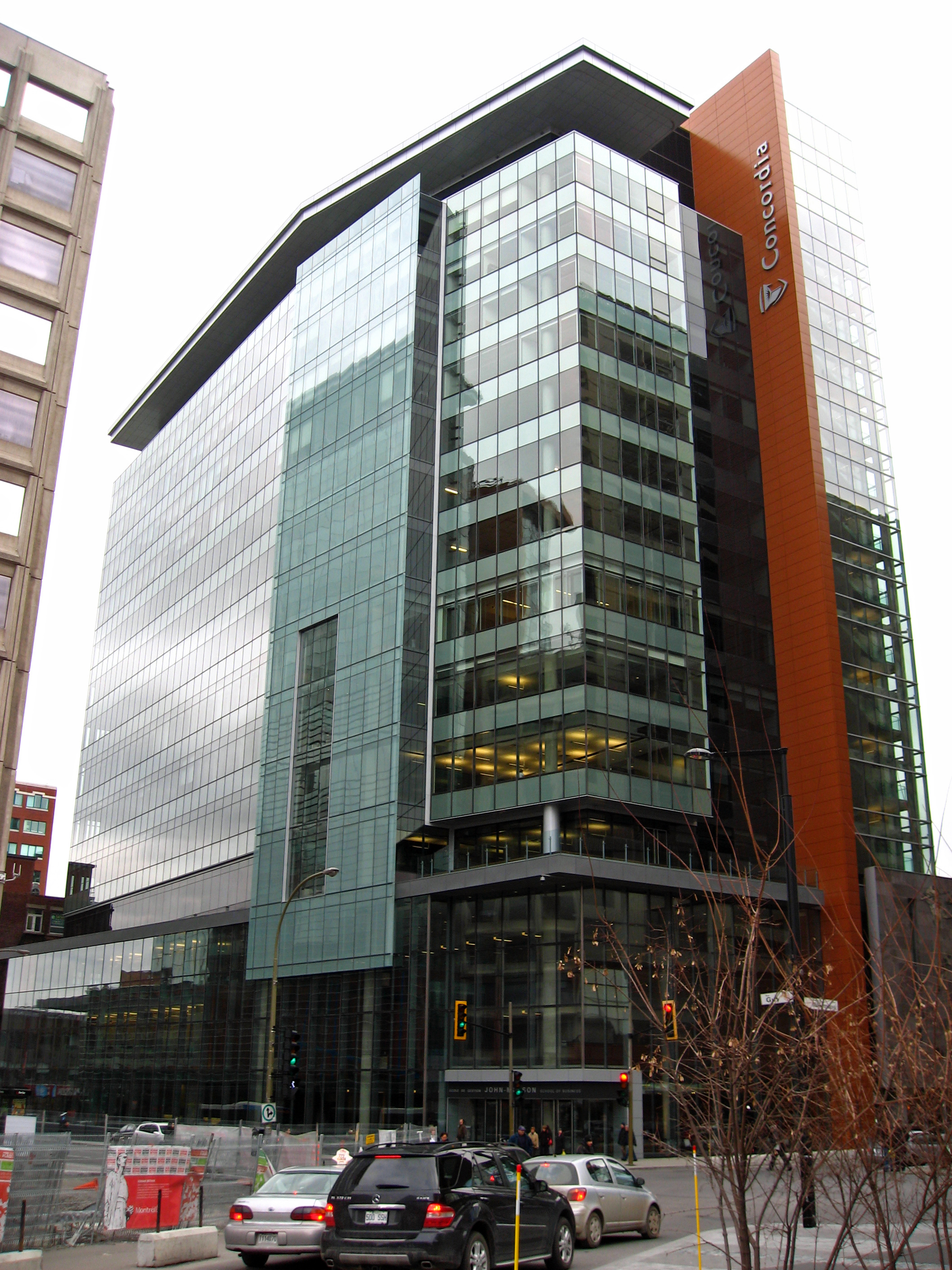
Completed in 2009, the John Molson Building houses the John Molson School of Business

=== Undergraduate programs ===
- Bachelor of Commerce (BComm)
- Certificate programs

=== Graduate programs ===
- Full-time/part-time MBA
- MBA in Investment Management
- Research-focused programs (MSc, PhD)
- Graduate Diploma in Chartered Professional Accountancy (CPA)

=== Executive education ===
- Executive MBA (EMBA)
- Certificates and open programs

== Notable people ==
=== Notable faculty and alumni ===
- Anne-Marie Croteau
- Mireille Gillings
- Rodolphe Saadé
- Karen Hogan
- Sydney Finkelstein
- Alexandre Bilodeau
- Klemen Ferjan
- Steven G Arless
- Gad Saad
- Gerald T. McCaughey
- Anthony Housefather
- Barbara Dunkelman
- Tony Loffreda
- Brian Scudamore
- Amos Yudan
- André Desmarais
- Harley Finkelstein
- Glen Murray (politician)

== See also ==
- Education in Canada
- Rankings of universities in Canada
