= Abdolhamid Akbarzadeh Shafaroudi =

Iranian-Canadian scientist

Abdolhamid Akbarzadeh Shafaroudi is an assistant professor in machine design, bioresource engineering, and mechanical engineering at McGill University. He currently holds the Canada Research Chair in Bio-inspired Hierarchical Multifunctional Metamaterials.

== Early life and education ==
Akbarzadeh Shafaroudi completed a Bachelor of Science in mechanical engineering at Isfahan University of Technology in Iran in 2007, followed by a Master of Science in mechanical engineering at Amirkabir University of Technology in Iran in 2009. In 2013, he completed a Doctor of Philosophy (Ph.D.) in mechanical engineering at the University of New Brunswick, followed by NSERC-funded post-doctoral training in mechanical engineering at McGill University.
