= Janet Leys Shaw Mactavish =

Canadian architect

- Born: 15 August 1925; Montreal, Quebec, Canada
- Died: 19 February 1972 (aged 46)
- Education: McGill University
- Occupation: architect
- Employer(s): Marshall and Merrett
- Known for: Architecture
- Notable work: McIntyre Medical Sciences Building; Stirling Hall (at Queen's University at Kingston); Beaconsfield High School

Janet Leys Shaw Mactavish (15 August 1925 – 19 February 1972) was a Canadian architect notable for her innovative design of schools and university buildings. Among her noteworthy works are two circular university buildings: Stirling Hall, the physics building at Queen's University in Ontario (1962); and the McIntyre Medical Sciences Building at McGill University in Montreal, Quebec (1965). She was a graduate of McGill University's School of Architecture.

Through the 1950s and 1960s, Mactavish worked for the architectural firm Marshall and Merrett. She was a colleague and friend of architect Dorice Walford. Mactavish designed many schools, including Beaconsfield High School (1958), Valois Park and Lakeside Heights (now École Pointe-Claire) on the West Island of Montreal.

Her modern designs and published ideas were known for their application of pedagogy to architectural planning of schools, for cost savings from the reduction of exterior walls, and for the focus on reduction of indoor congestion and corridor traffic between classes. "Mactavish's schools and U- and L- shaped structures ... illustrate the rational, economic planning ideas popular in the 1950s. Her major idea to decrease costs was to reduce the amount of space given over to circulation."
