= McIntyre Medical Sciences Building =

Coordinates: 45.50315°N 73.58248°W

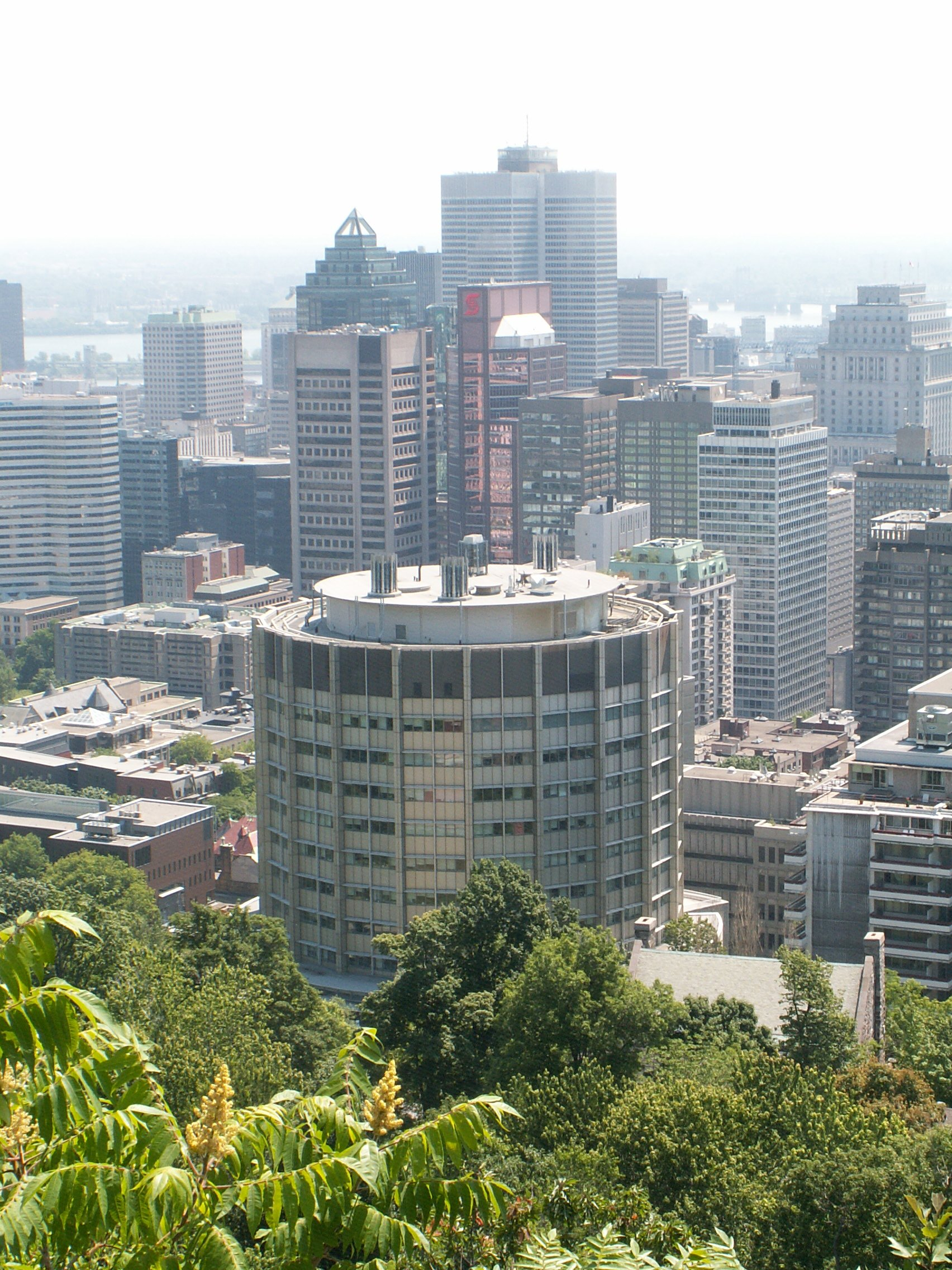
- The prominent round building is the McIntyre Medical Sciences Building, part of McGill University campus.

General information
- Location: 3655 Promenade Sir William Osler, Montreal, Canada
- Groundbreaking: 1964
- Opened: 1966

Technical details
- Floor count: 16

Design and construction
- Architect: Janet Leys Shaw Mactavish
- Architecture firm: Marshall and Merrett

The McIntyre Medical Sciences Building is part of the McGill University campus in Montreal, Quebec, Canada. A concrete building built in 1965, it is known for its circular shape. The McIntyre Building is the central hub of the McGill University Faculty of Medicine. Its sixteen floors include classrooms, research facilities, laboratories, offices and a cafeteria. Its design, by Canadian architect Janet Leys Shaw Mactavish of the architecture firm Marshall and Merrett, is meant to reduce traffic and circulation between rooms.

Its position on the sloping side of Mount Royal, and the requirement for there to be two entrances at different levels (ground and 6th floors), made it a difficult architectural design site. Its modern circular shape and design, as well as its height amidst the older buildings of the McGill campus, contributed to Montreal's image at the time of the Expo 67 World's Fair.

The McIntyre Building, as it is generally known, houses, among other services and departments, the Osler Library of the History of Medicine (named after one of McGill's most famous medical graduates and professors and an icon of modern medicine William Osler) the Departments of Pharmacology & Therapeutics, Biochemistry, Physiology, and Anesthesia. The Life Sciences Library, which was the successor to the McGill Medical library, founded in 1823. was moved to the Schulich Library of Science and Engineering in 2013–2014. It is part of the McGill University Life Sciences Research Complex.

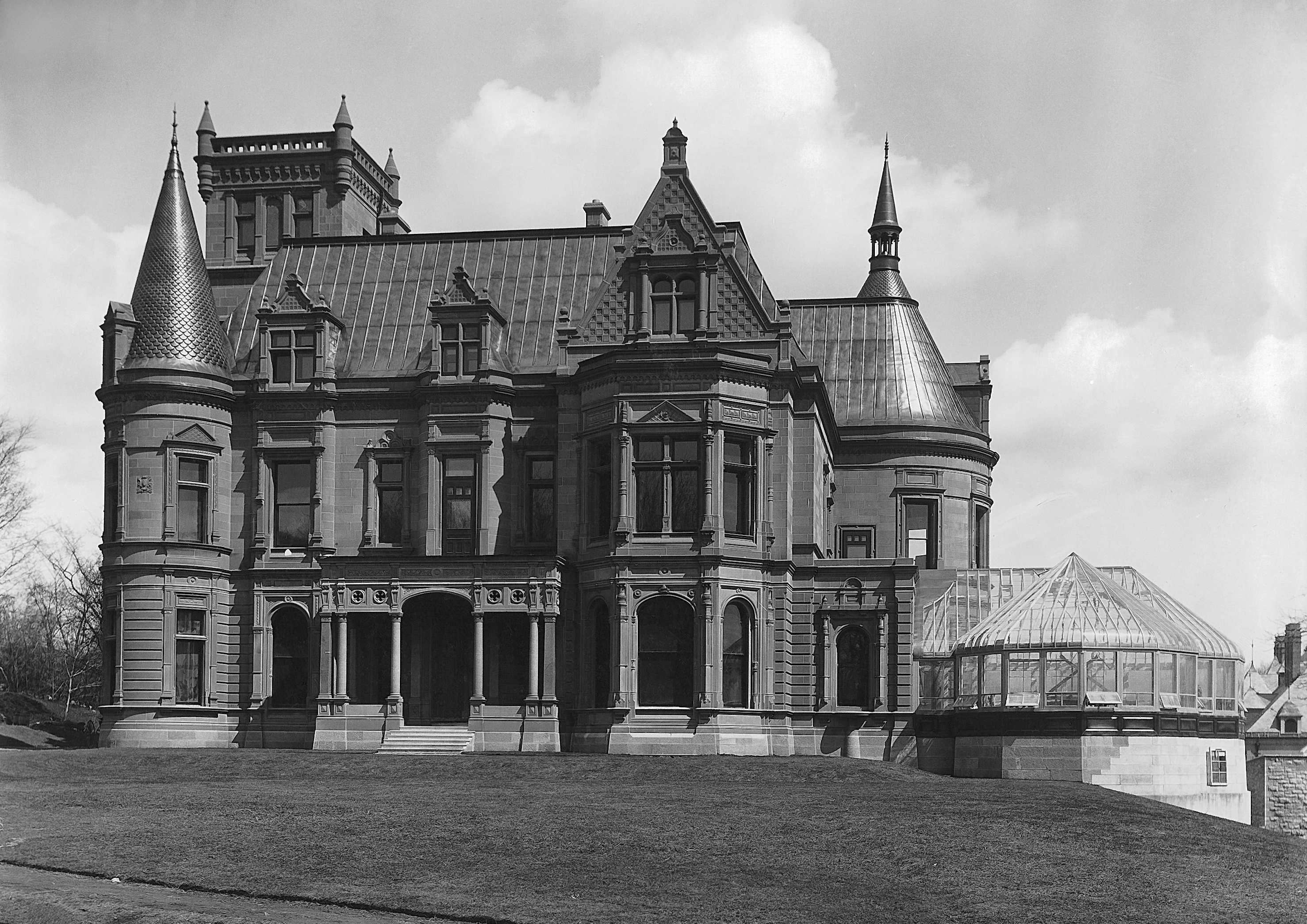
Craguie, circa 1890

== Site ==
The McIntyre Medical Sciences Building is named for Canadian Pacific Railway founder Duncan McIntyre and is situated on the former site of his mansion "Craguie" in the Golden Square Mile district. Designed by William Thomas and completed in the 1880s, Craguie was demolished in 1930. Family members donated the land to McGill in McIntyre's honour in 1947. Prior to the construction of the McIntyre Medical Sciences Building and adjacent Stewart Biological Sciences Building, the site had been known as McIntyre Park.
