= Steven G Arless =

Canadian entrepreneur (born 1949)

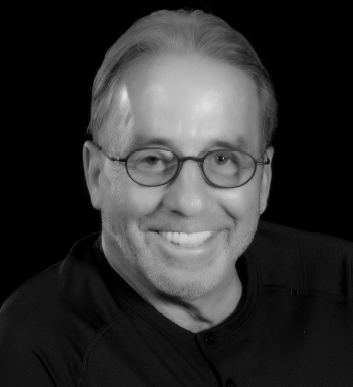
- Born: July 23, 1949 (age 77); Montreal, Quebec, Canada
- Education: McGill University (BSc 1971); Concordia University (MBA 2008)
- Occupations: Medical Technology Entrepreneur, Adjunct Professor
- Title: Professor of Practice, McGill University; Co-Founder, Soundbite Medical Solutions Inc. Co-Founder & CEO, ViTAA Medical Solutions Inc

Steven G Arless was a Canadian entrepreneur in the biomedical technology industry. He directed and developed several medical device companies treating cardiovascular disease from inception through major financing and public stock offering, advancing new medical devices from R&D to commercialization and global sales, including CryoCath Technologies, CardioInsight and Resonant Medical. He has been CEO of a number of companies, most notably CryoCath Technologies (sold to Medtronic Inc. for C$400 million), Resonant Medical (sold to Elekta AB for $30 million), and CardioInsight (also sold to Medtronic for US $100 million).

== Early life and education ==
Arless was born in Montreal, Quebec on July 23, 1949. His father, an accountant, and his mother were immigrants to Canada from Lebanon. Arless studied Chemistry and Engineering at McGill University, graduating with a BSc. in 1971. Arless also completed his MBA at the John Molson School of Business at Concordia University in Montréal in 2008.

== Career ==
Arless is an angel investor in medical technology and is involved in mentorship and teaching of graduate students at McGill University and Concordia University and McGill University where he is a Professor of Practice.

In 1971, Arless worked with Smith & Nephew, a British medical equipment company for 17 years and was president for five years. He was CEO of the North American operations from 1986 to 1990.

In 1996, Arless became CEO of CryoSurge founded in 1995 and changed the name to CryoCath Technologies inc., in 1997, a company specializing in a cryoablation treatment for heart arrhythmia. Arless was president and CEO of CryoCath from its inception until 2006, when he resigned.

Arless relocated to Cleveland, Ohio in 2009 to become CEO of CardioInsight, a company marketing and advancing research in cardiovascular technology. Arless stepped down from his position at CardioInsight in 2012.

Arless co-founded medical device company, Soundbite Medical Solutions, which fabricated wire devices to treat occlusions caused by coronary and peripheral artery disease with shockwaves. Arless stepped down as CEO in 2017.

As of early 2018, Arless has been MedTech Entrepreneur-in-Residence at Centech, a Montreal-based technology accelerator that strives to create new sustainable high tech business startups.

In late 2019, Arless co-founded and took the position as CEO of ViTAA Medical Solutions, a healthcare AI company specializing in 3D mapping of patients with aortic aneurysms that provide surgeons with clinical intelligence to guide therapy.

== Awards ==
Arless was awarded the Ernst & Young Entrepreneur of the Year award in 2005 for Health Sciences.
