= John Campbell Merrett =

Canadian architect (1909–1998)

- Born: August 26, 1909; Montreal, Quebec, Canada
- Died: November 3, 1998 (aged 89); Montreal, Quebec, Canada
- Education: School of Architecture at McGill University; University of London
- Occupation: Architect
- Projects: Central Station; Royal Victoria Hospital

John Campbell Merrett (August 26, 1909 – November 3, 1998) was a Canadian architect whose most noteworthy work was the interior design of Montreal's Central Station.

Merrett was born in Montreal, Quebec, Canada.

== Biography ==
=== Early life ===
The fourth child of Thomas Edward Merrett, banker, and his wife, Katherine Stuart Campbell, Merrett's childhood summers were spent in Métis-sur-Mer. He attended Selwyn House School in Westmount, Quebec, and Ashbury College, Ottawa, Ontario.

=== Marriage and family ===
Campbell Merrett married Hazel Howard, one of four daughters of Judge Eratus Edwin Howard and his wife Evalyn Peverley, in 1937. His two sons – Timothy Howard Merrett, professor of computer science at McGill, and Brian Merrett, photographer – live in Montreal and North Hatley.

=== Education ===
Merrett graduated in 1931 from the School of Architecture at McGill University and subsequently did formative work traveling on scholarship in Europe. He did post-graduate studies in London, England, resulting in a certificate in Town Planning from the University of London in 1934. In 1944 he took a Special Planning Course at M.I.T., Boston.

=== Career ===
From 1936 to 1942 Campbell was staff architect for the Canadian National Railway, for whom he designed the concourse of Montreal's Central Station. In 1944 and 1945 he was the Town Planning Director for the City of Saint John, New Brunswick, following which he joined Ernest Isbell Barott to form Barott, Marshall, Montgomery and Merrett, where he worked until his retirement in 1977. His projects included the town plan of Pointe Claire, Quebec, as well as buildings for regional school boards, universities and pharmaceutical companies. His real joy came from the many expansion projects at Montreal's Royal Victoria Hospital and much of the modern skyline of that institution can be attributed to him.

== See also ==
- Janet Leys Shaw Mactavish

== External ==
- Historic Places in Canada
