= Samuel Herbert Maw =

British-Canadian architect and cartographer

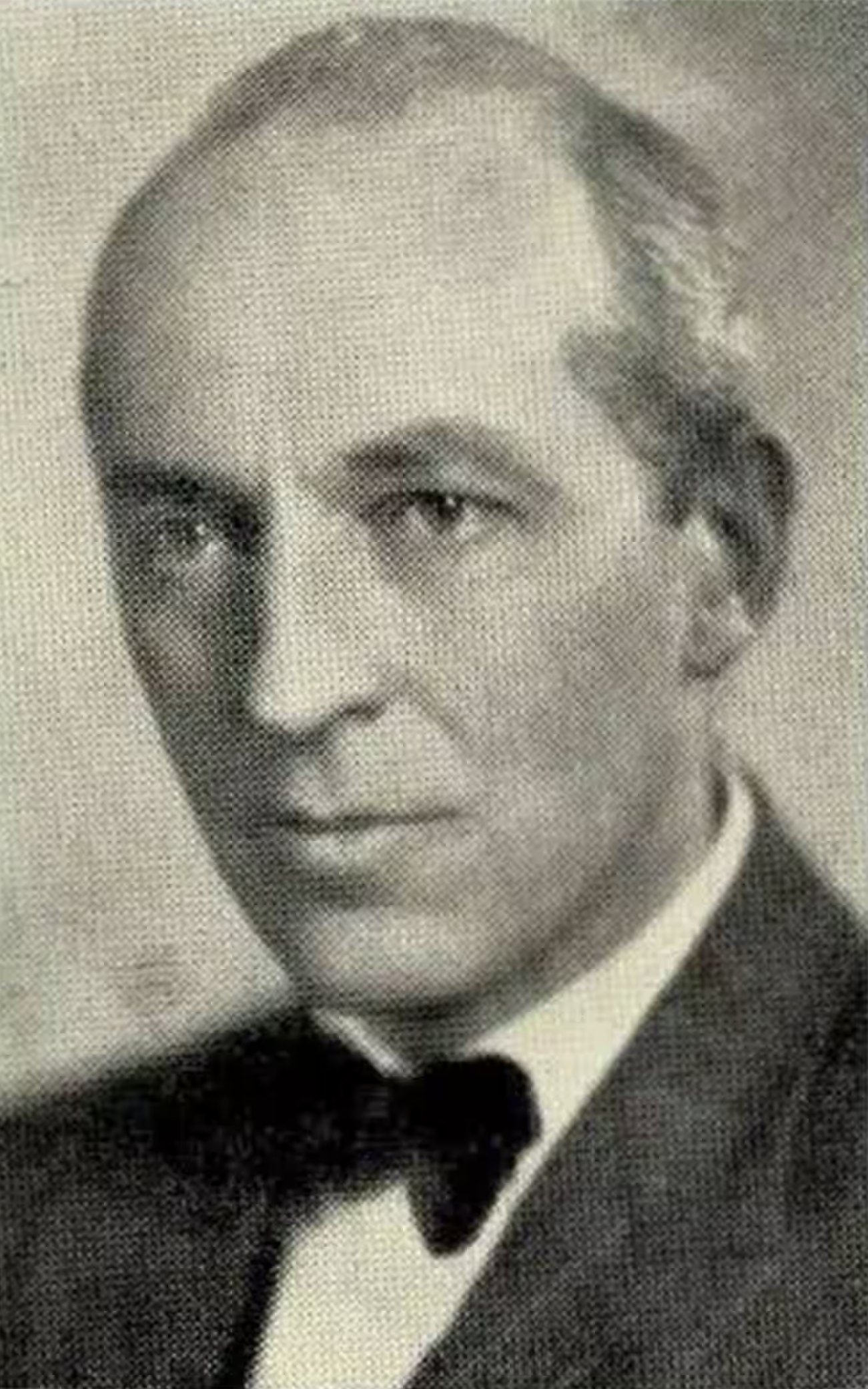
- Maw in 1936
- Born: September 12, 1881; Needham Market, Suffolk, England
- Died: August 19, 1952 (aged 70); Toronto, Ontario, Canada
- Occupations: Architect, delineator, cartographer
- Known for: The City of Quebec (1932); La Cité de Montréal (1942)
- Notable work: Toronto Stock Exchange; St. Philip's Church (Montreal-West)

Samuel Herbert Maw (September 12, 1881 – August 19, 1952) was a British-Canadian architect, delineator and cartographer.

Born in the English county of Suffolk, he learned architecture in England and found success there as a delineator before emigrating to Canada in 1912. In Toronto, he worked for Darling & Pearson, a leading architectural firm, until 1918. During that time, he also worked on his own designs. In 1923, Maw moved to Montreal, where he collaborated with Philip J. Turner on St. Phillip's Anglican Church in Montreal West. In 1937, while back in Toronto, he worked on the design of the then Toronto Stock Exchange (now home to the Design Exchange), a notable Art Deco building.

Besides his architectural work, Maw found success as a cartographer, starting in 1929 when he published a pictorial map of the St. Lawrence Estuary. In 1932, he published The City of Quebec, an intricate hand-drawn map of Quebec City with historical notes. It was reproduced thousands of times and led him to be commissioned to draw This Is Canada, a booklet of maps to commemorate the 1939 royal tour of Canada by King George VI and Queen Elizabeth. The original folio was gifted to the king by prime minister William Lyon Mackenzie King. In 1942, the tercentenary of Montreal, he published La Cité de Montréal, a map of the city in the style of The City of Quebec. Maw died in Toronto in 1952 at the age of 70.

== Early life and career ==
Samuel Herbert Maw was born in Needham Market, Suffolk, England on September 12, 1881. As a child, he attended Ackworth School in West Yorkshire. He went on to informally study architecture under John S. Dorden in Ipswich, Suffolk, before moving to London to continue his training under Edward William Mountford, a prominent Edwardian architect. There, he learned the skills of technical and artistic drawing, engraving and etching. In 1905, his drawings won him the Soane Medallion, bestowed by the Royal Institute of British Architects and named after architect John Soane. A travelling scholarship, the distinction allowed him to travel across Western Europe to further his training. In 1909, his work was exhibited at the Royal Academy of Arts in London.

== Work in Canada ==
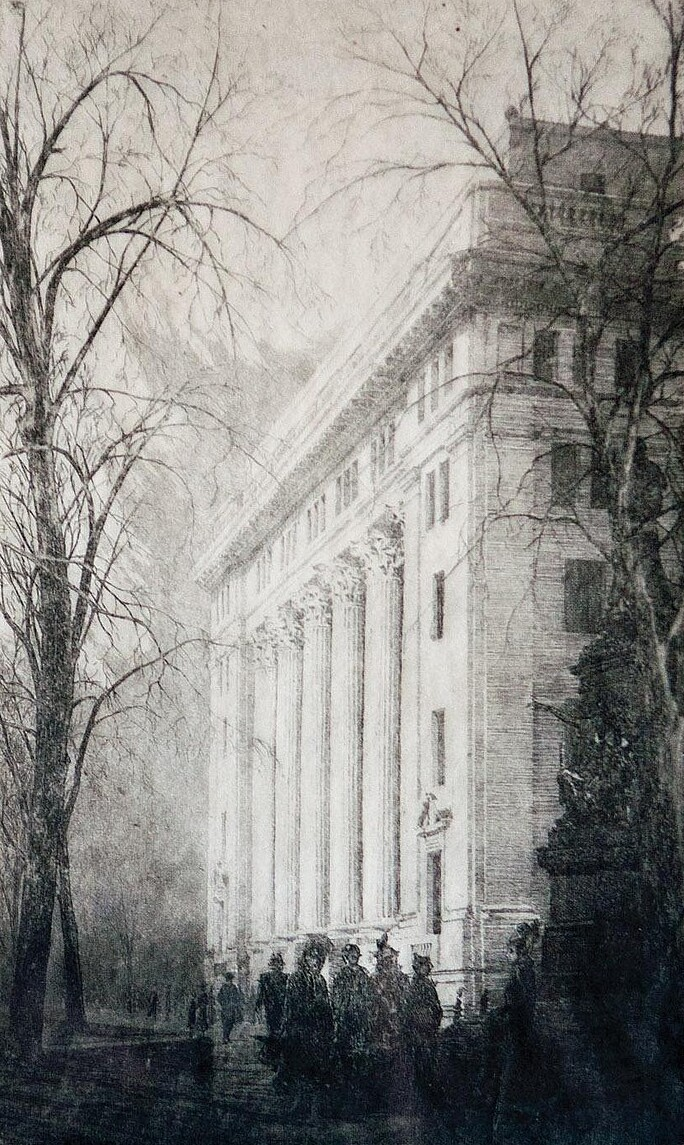
Etching by Maw of Montreal's Sun Life Building, designed by Darling & Pearson (1917 or 1924)

Maw emigrated to Toronto, Ontario, Canada in 1912, after a brief period working in New York City. He joined a leading architectural firm, Darling & Pearson, and drew architectural delineations of the firm's commissions at the request of Frank Darling. During that period, he also worked on his own architectural designs and submitted them in competitions.

Maw left Darling & Pearson in 1918 to work in Halifax, Nova Scotia. In 1923, he moved to Montreal, Quebec to work in the office of Philip J. Turner, with whom he designed St. Phillip's Anglican Church in Montreal West. In 1925, he began practicing alone. In 1926, he joined the firm Ross & Macdonald, where he likely served as a designer and delineator on the project of Toronto's Royal York Hotel. After his time there, he returned to Toronto.

In 1929, Maw published a pictorial map of the St. Lawrence Estuary, from Quebec City to Gaspesia, commissioned by the province of Quebec's tourism office. In 1932, he achieved further recognition as a cartographer when he published The City of Quebec, an intricate and colourful map of Quebec City which he had begun working on in 1926. The map, which features detailed drawings of individual buildings and informative text on the history of the city, evokes the style of the Wonderground Map (1914) of London by MacDonald Gill. It was reproduced thousands of times and sold to visitors of Quebec City for nearly three decades.

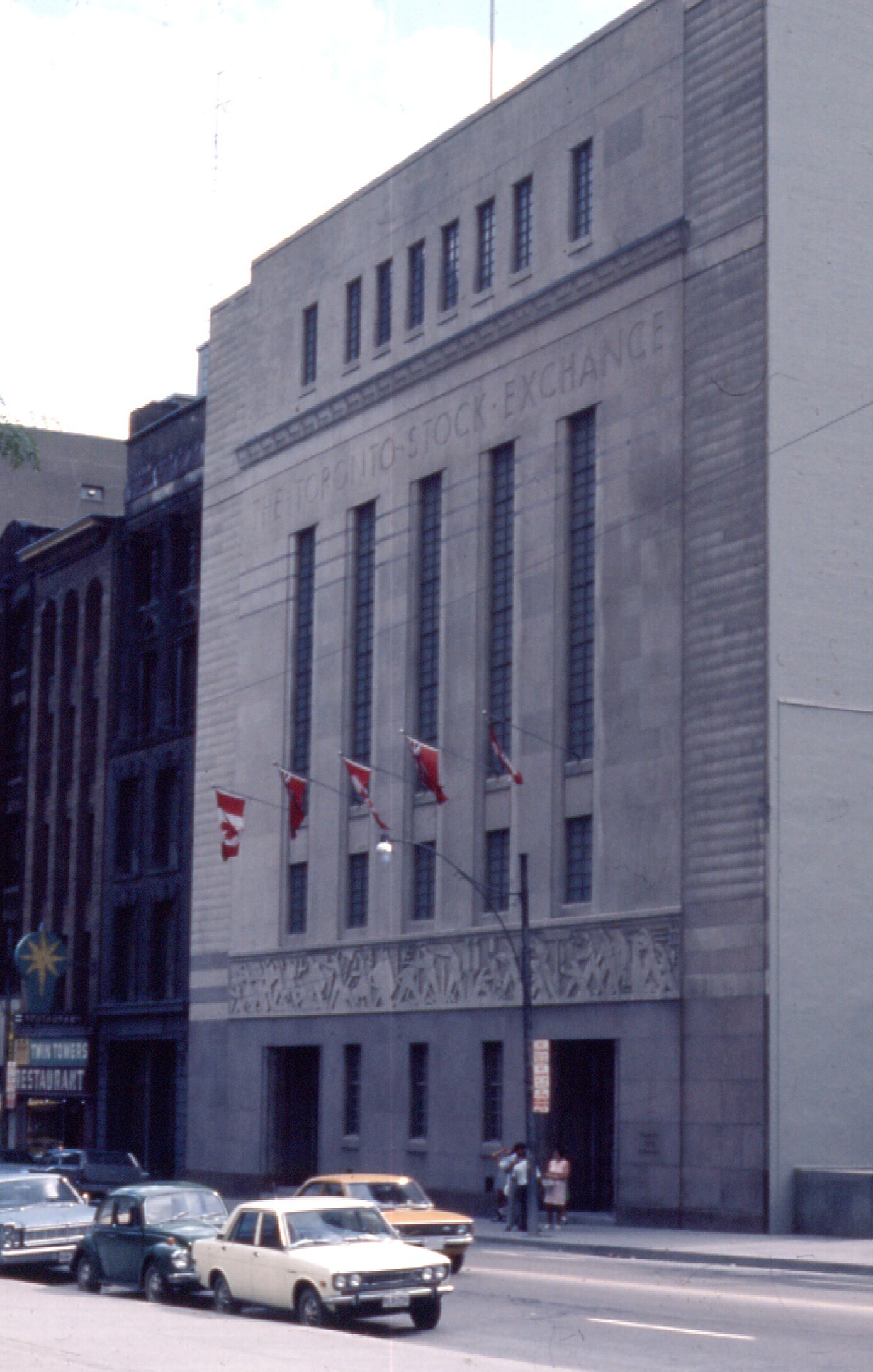
The Toronto Stock Exchange in 1973, before becoming the Design Exchange

In 1937, he collaborated as an associate architect with George & Moorhouse on what was then the Toronto Stock Exchange, now known as the Design Exchange. It is considered a notable specimen of Art Deco architecture in North America. Following the popularity of The City of Quebec, Maw was commissioned to draw This Is Canada, a booklet of maps of each Canadian province to commemorate the 1939 royal tour of Canada by King George VI and Queen Elizabeth, the first visit of North America by the reigning British monarch. The original folio was gifted to King George by Canadian prime minister William Lyon Mackenzie King.

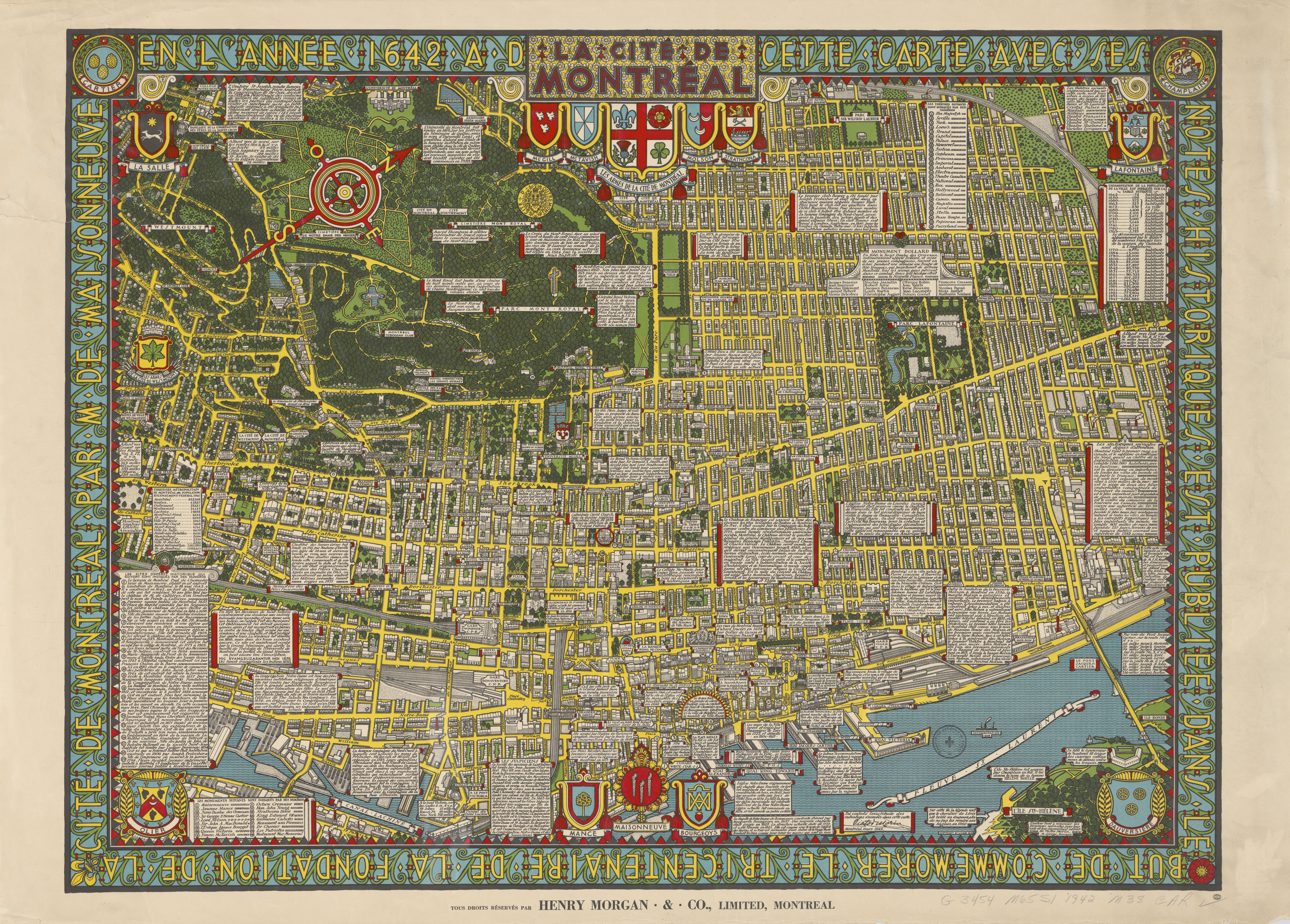
La Cité de Montréal (1942)

In 1940, Maw began teaching Architectural Rendering and Perspective at McGill University in Montreal. However, as World War II unfolded, he soon left Montreal for Ottawa, where he worked for the Department of National Defence, making use of his engineering background. In 1942, on the tercentenary of Montreal, Maw published La Cité de Montréal, a map of Montreal in the same style as The City of Quebec. Its historical accuracy was ensured by notary, politician and historian Victor Morin. The original drawing was exhibited in the concourse of Montreal's Windsor Station for several months. In 1944, Maw published a map of Ottawa commissioned by the city itself. He died in Toronto on August 19, 1952, at the age of 70.
