= Expo for Design, Innovation & Technology =

Coordinates: 43°38′48″N 79°23′25″W

Expo For Design, Innovation & Technology
- Location: Toronto, Ontario, Canada
- Website: editdx.org/home

Expo for Design, Innovation & Technology (EDIT) is a 10-day festival launched by the Canadian Design Exchange (DX) in partnership with the United Nations Development Programme (UNDP). It is also supported by the Government of Ontario and its Ontario150 Program. The festival received a $1.75 million investment from the Government of Ontario in 2017. The festival focuses on design, innovation, and technology solutions and highlights the design industry's potential to solve issues on a global scale. The first annual festival took place in Toronto from September 28 to October 8, 2017, with a capacity of approximately 100,000 visitors.

The overall theme of EDIT was "Prosperity For All". It was inspired by the United Nations Development Program's (UNDP) Global Goals for Sustainable Development. The theme was portrayed through an art installation by designer Bruce Man, who co-founded Massive Change Network. It featured large black and white images of global conflict, like pollution, genocide, and terrorism.
