= Philip J. Turner =

- Born: 1876; Stowmarket, Suffolk, England
- Died: 13 August 1943 (aged 66–67); Montreal, Quebec
- Education: Architectural Association School of Architecture
- Occupation: Architect
- Awards: Fellow of the Royal Institute of British Architects; Senior Fellow of the Royal Architectural Institute of Canada; Gold Medal of the Province of Quebec Association of Architects

Philip John Turner FRIBA FRAIC (1876 – 13 August 1943) was an architect and educator from Stowmarket, Suffolk. After emigrating to Canada in 1906, he began a private architectural practice in Montreal, and in 1910 became a lecturer at the McGill School of Architecture, where he would teach for more than three decades. He became the director of the School in 1939 and opened the door to co-ed education while also fighting the threat of the School's closing due to low enrollment after the Great Depression and amidst World War II.

As an architect, Turner designed many types of buildings, including residences, churches, banks, libraries and commercial buildings. He served on the council of the Province of Quebec Association of Architects (PQAA) and became president in 1933. He received the Gold Medal of the PQAA in 1941. He also served on the council of the Royal Architectural Institute of Canada, where he represented the Royal Institute of British Architects. He was elected as a Fellow of the Royal Institute of British Architects and Senior Fellow of the Royal Architectural Institute of Canada.

== Personal life and education ==
Philip Turner was born in Stowmarket, Suffolk in 1876 to a large family of many sisters and brothers. He attended Framlingham College in Suffolk for secondary education and the Architectural Association School of Architecture for post-secondary education. He articled to John Shewell Corder from 1892 to 1895 and was his assistant from 1895 to 1898. He was the assistant to Francis William Tasker in 1898, James Ransome from 1899 to 1900 and to Charles Barry Edward from 1901 to 1907. He passed his architectural exam in 1900. He married Adeline Peddar in June 1910. Turner died from a heart attack on August 13, 1943, two years after he retired from being director at McGill's School of Architecture.

== Teaching career ==
Turner emigrated to Canada in 1906, and joined the McGill School of Architecture's faculty in 1910, where he first taught a lecture on Building Construction. He soon began to also teach Materials of Construction, Professional Practice and Specifications, and was appointed Professor in 1933. In addition to teaching at the School of Architecture, Turner was appointed Special Lecturer on Library Buildings in 1926 in the McGill Library School, which he continued to hold until after his retirement from the architecture school. In 1939, he succeeded Ramsay Traquair as the director of the School of Architecture, a position he held for only two years until 1941. During these two years, however, he accomplished a great deal at the School. Turner became director at a time when student enrollment was very low, in the wake of the Great Depression in Canada and the outbreak of World War II. Enrollment was so low that the Principal of McGill at the time, Lewis Williams Douglas considered phasing out architectural education at McGill. As director, Turner, along with his Executive Secretary, John Bland, fought the threat of the School's closing and gathered the support of several distinguished architects in Montreal, ultimately convincing the Principal not to close the School. He created an advisory committee on the School of Architecture in 1939, with E.I. Barott, Harold Lea Fetherstonhaugh and J.C. McDougal representing the profession, and he and Percy Nobbs representing the School.

Turner also opened the door to co-ed education at the School of Architecture, which had not yet been done at any department within the Faculty of Engineering at McGill. In 1943, two years after Turner retired as director, Catherine Mary Wisnicki became the School's first female graduate and the first female graduate from the Faculty of Engineering.

Philip Turner's health was quite frail by the time he became director of the School, and in the following year it had deteriorated so much that he entrusted the directorship to his Executive Secretary, John Bland, who became the new director in 1941, though they continued to work together for the remainder of that year. Two years after his retirement, Turner died from a heart attack. The Philip J. Turner Prize was established in his memory at the School, and is presented to the student with the highest standing in the studio course, Design and Construction 2.

== Architectural career ==
Turner designed many types of buildings throughout his career, ranging from residences to churches, toward the end of his career. He began an independent practice in Stowmarket, Suffolk in 1900, and again in 1908 in Montreal, Quebec. Much of his architectural work between 1900 and his death in 1943 was through his own practice, however he worked in partnership with William Edward Carless from 1913 to 1915, as well as with Samuel Herbert Maw.

List of Built Projects
Year	Project	Location
1903	Stowmarket Co-Operative Society	Stowmarket, England
1908-09	Residence for an unidentified client	Westmount, Quebec
1909	Residence for Reginald H. Buchanan	Westmount, Quebec
1909	Residence for John S. Withell	Mount Royal Ward, Westmount, Quebec
1909	Residence for Henry Goodchild	Birch Avenue, Saint Lambert, Quebec
1909	Residence for J.A. Goldie	Front Street, Saint Lambert, Quebec
1909-10	Chateau Beauclaire Hotel	Mercille Street, Saint Lambert, Quebec
1909	Block of shops and flats for Sir Thomas Shaughnessy	Notre Dame Street East, at Maisonneuve Street, Montreal
1910	Ice Palace for the Winter Carnival	Montreal
1910	Residence for H.S. Thomas	Outremont, Quebec
1910	Residences for James Bryce and William Agnew	Cedar Avenue, Montreal
1910	Printing office for Emmerson G. Hart	Saint Lambert, Quebec
1911	St. Alban's Anglican Church	St. Zotique Street East near Alma Avenue, Montreal
1911	Timmins Co. Ltd. factory	Mount Royal Avenue at Clarke Street, Montreal
1911	Molson's Bank	Notre Dame Street at Sixth Avenue, Lachine, Quebec
1911	Molson's Bank	Sainte-Thérèse, Quebec
1911	Residence for M. Scarth Stevenson	Westmount, Quebec
1911	Residence for George McCowan	Maplewood Avenue, Montreal
1911	Molson's Bank	Park Avenue at Bernard Avenue, Montreal
1912	Residence for Mrs. John Archibald	Sherbrooke Street West at Elm Avenue, Montreal
1912	Dupuis Bros. Ltd., large annex to department store	Ste. Catherine Street East at St. Andre Street, Montreal
1912	Molson's Bank	Drummondville, Quebec
1913	Molson's Bank	Cumberland Street at Park Avenue, Port Arthur, Ontario
1913	Pair of houses for E. Fabre-Surveyer	Maplewood Avenue, Outremont
1914	Molson's Bank	Frankford, Ontario
1914	Molson's Bank	Cowansville, Quebec
1914	Residence for Howard Murray	Belvedere Road, Westmount, Quebec
1914	Home Bank of Canada	Montreal
1914	Residence for Miss. F. Kruse	Sainte-Anne-de-Bellevue, Quebec
1914	Residence for Irving P. Rexford	Montrose Avenue, Westmount
1914	Residence for John Irwin	Rosemont Avenue, Westmount
1914	Residence for Edward Ouellette	Ainslie Avenue, Outremont
1914	Residence for Rodolphe Tourville	Ainslie Avenue, Outremont
1914	Residence for W.E. Mowat	Carleton Avenue, Westmount
1914	Residence for Miss Elliott	Carleton Avenue, Westmount
1914	Residence for Mrs. William Norris	Outremont
1914	Residence for F. Charles Skelton	Chomedey Street, at Comte Street, Montreal
1914	House at Lake St.-Louis for an unidentified client	Beaurepaire, Quebec
1914	Molson's Bank	St. Laurent Boulevard at Ontario Street, Montreal
1914	Molson's Bank	Norwich, Ontario
1914	Molson's Bank	Sorel, Quebec
1917	Summer residence for M. Scarth Stevenson	Point Cavagnol, Como, Quebec
1918	Molson's Bank	Williamsburg, Ontario
1920	Molson's Bank	Bedford, Quebec
1920	Molson's Bank	King Street, Kitchener, Ontario
1920	Molson's Bank	Talbot Street at Flora Street, St. Thomas, Ontario
1920	Molson's Bank	Ayr, Ontario
1920	Molson's Bank	Market Square, Hamilton, Ontario
1920	Montreal Sailor's Institute	Place Royale at Capitol Street, Montreal
1921	Residence for H. Grimsdale, Wiseman Avenue	Wiseman Avenue, Outremont
1921	Bethany Presbyterian Church	Charlevoix Street at Rushbrooke Street, Montreal
1922	Pair of houses for Irving P. Rexford	Montrose Avenue, Westmount, Quebec
1923	Molson's Bank	Riviere-du-Loup, Quebec
1923	Residence for William Gear	Avenue Road, Westmount, Quebec
1923	Christ Church Anglican Cathedral	Ste. Catherine Street West at Union Avenue, Montreal
1913	St. Cuthbert's Anglican Church	Ogilvy Avenue at Outremont Avenue, Montreal
1924	Crown Trust LTD.	St. James Street, Montreal
1927-28	St. Columba Anglican Church (Parish Hall)	Hingston Avenue, Montreal
1928	St. Paul's Anglican Church	Empire Street, Greenfield Park
1928	St. Saviour's Anglican Church	Western Avenue at Regent Avenue, Montreal
1928	Julia Drummond Hostel	Mark Street at Bayle Street, Montreal
1929	St. Philip's Anglican Church (with Samuel H. Maw)	Brock Avenue, Montreal
1936	Remodelling of the Westmount Public Library	Sherbrooke Street West at Arlington Avenue, Montreal
1939	Union Church	Lac Marois, Quebec
1940	YMCA Chapel and library	Drummond Street, Montreal

== See also ==
- Percy Nobbs
- Stewart Henbest Capper
