= Design Exchange =

Event venue in Toronto, Ontario

Design Exchange (DX)
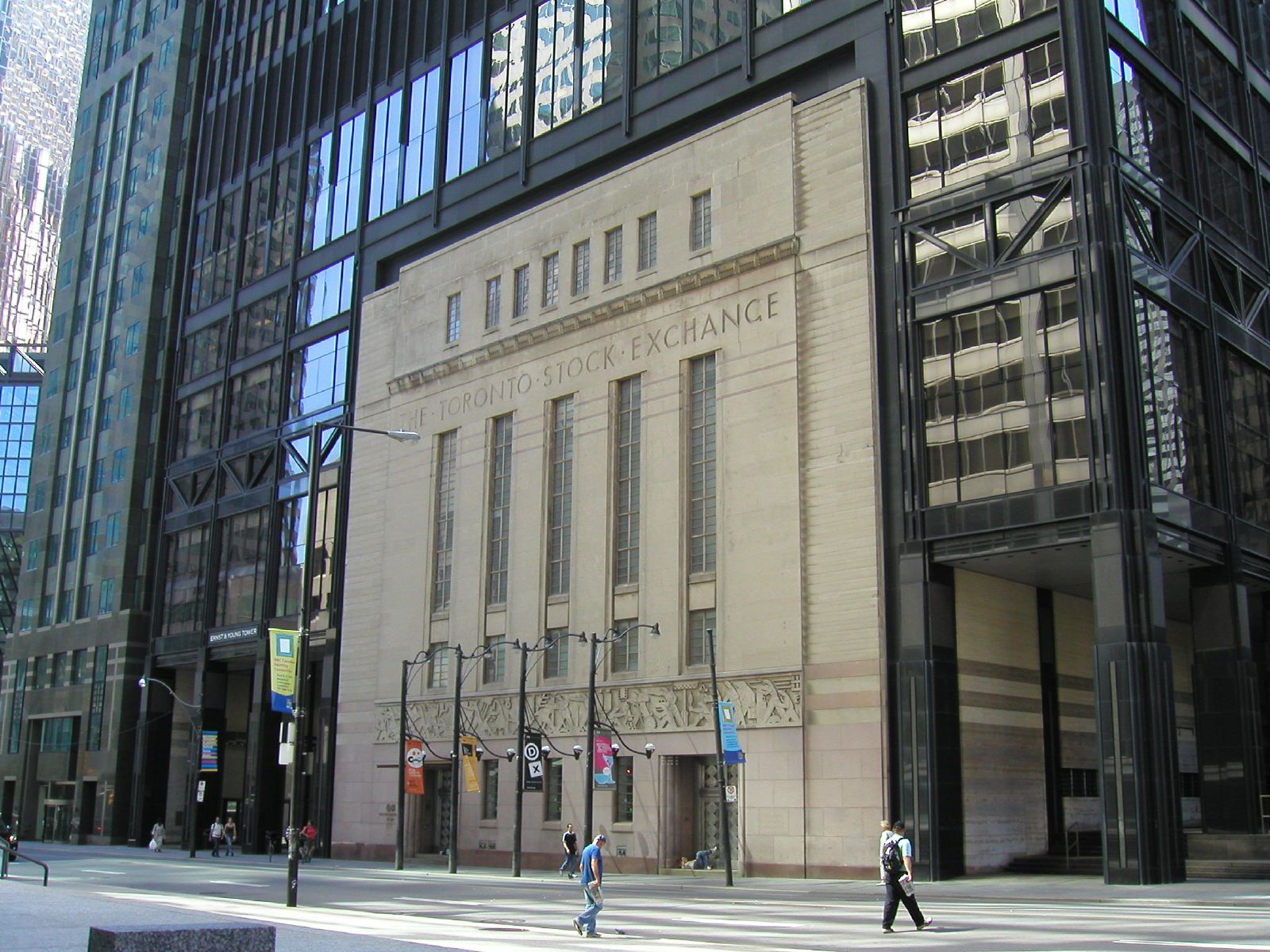
- Established: 1994
- Type: Design, Education Centre
- Location: 234 Bay Street, Toronto, Ontario, Canada
- Coordinates: 43.64774°N 79.38011°W
- Website: designexchangetoronto.com

The Design Exchange (DX) is an event venue in Toronto, Ontario, Canada. It is located in the Financial District in the historical Toronto Stock Exchange building, which in 1991 was incorporated into a skyscraper, the Toronto-Dominion Centre (222 Bay Street). The organization operated a design museum, but this museum was closed in 2019. Since 2017, it hosts a biennial design festival, the Expo for Design, Innovation, & Technology (EDIT).

== History ==
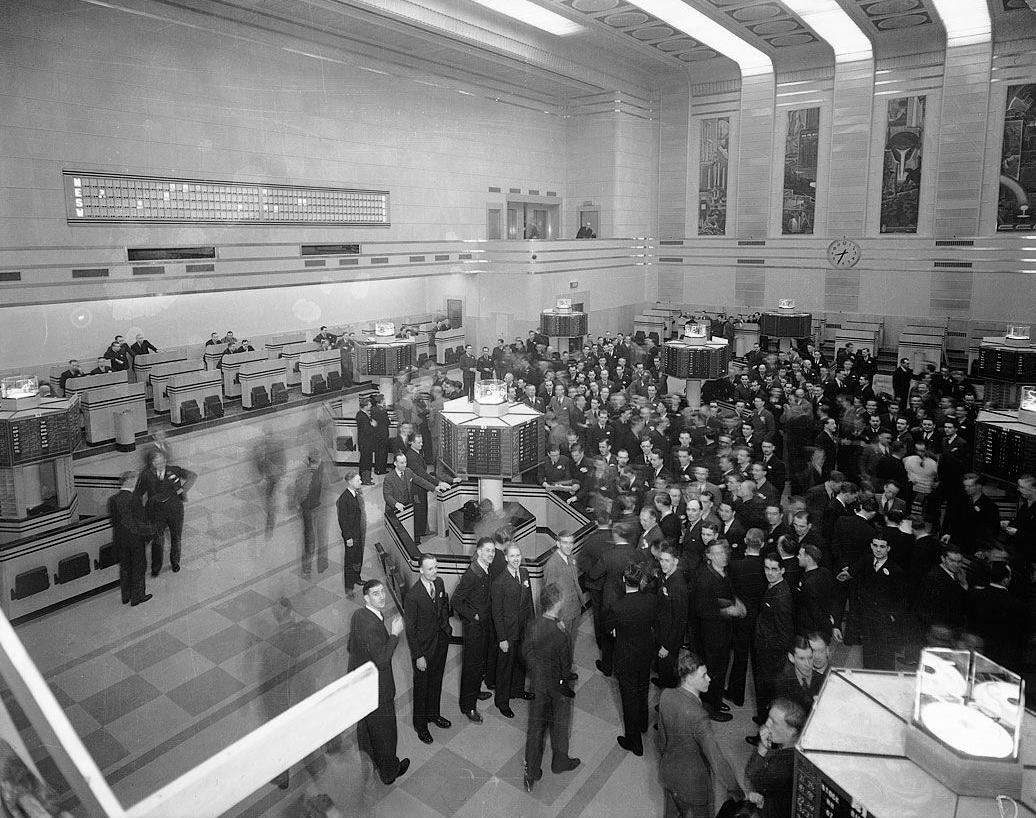
The building presently occupied by the Design Exchange was used by the Toronto Stock Exchange from 1937 to 1978.

The federal agency, Design Canada, closed in 1985, followed by the University of Toronto's (soon rescinded) announcement in 1986 that its school of architecture was to be shut down. In 1983, the Toronto Stock Exchange moved out of 234 Bay Street, which was a designated heritage property since 1978. Olympia and York (O&Y) purchased the building.

A study commissioned by O&Y indicated that there was support for using the building as a cultural design centre. Advocates of this proposal gathered in January 1986 to lobby the city government, and the city recognized ten of them as "The Group for the Creation of a Design Centre in Toronto", which legally became an organization in 1987 and later became the Design Exchange organization. A study launched by the city found that the proposal was "both possible and desirable".

The Bay Street property was sold in 1986 to Cadillac Fairview and the Toronto Dominion Bank but O&Y required that the design centre idea would be kept. The new owner had to pay the city $500,000 a year to use for running the centre. This centre was named the Design Exchange in 1988 and control of it was handed to the citizens' group which had advocated for it.

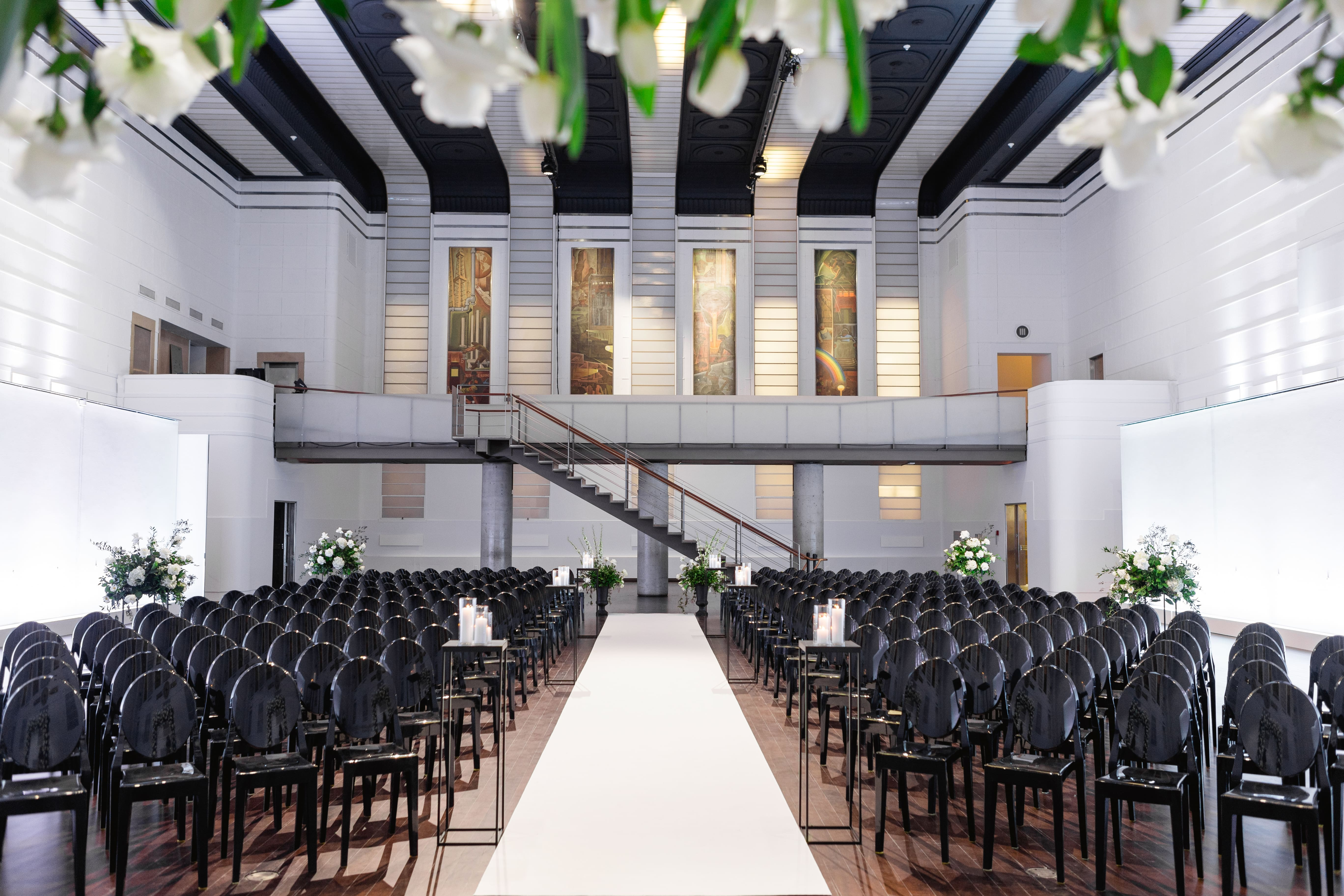
A wedding ceremony in the iconic Trading Floor of the Design Exchange.

In 1996, a permanent collection was established. DX held exhibitions and also organized educational programs and design awards.

From 2003 to 2011, the Design Exchange was led by Samantha Sannella, an architect and designer who strengthened Canadian exhibitions, created educational programs and grew the National Design Awards programs. Under her leadership, the DX led export programs for designers to showcase new and innovative products overseas. Key exhibitions included 'Plastic' a history of objects made with synthetic materials in Canada, a retrospective of from Toronto Star architecture critic Christopher Hume, and numerous international exhibitions from Italy, Japan, Korea, India and Denmark. During this timeframe, the DX was home to ACIDO, the voice of industrial designers in Ontario. The permanent collection of design grew during this timeframe to include many new objects that represented excellence in Industrial Design. Most notably, a key exhibition and publication profiling Clairtone, which was founded by Peter Munk early in his career was met with great success.

In March 2012 the Design Exchange came under the directorship of Shauna Levy, and began to operate exclusively as a design museum. In 2015, DX was organizing exhibitions in other locations, such as Smarter.Faster.Tougher., an exhibition about the design of sportswear.

In 2017, the Design Exchange launched a 10-day festival called Expo for Design, Innovation & Technology (EDIT), in partnership with the United Nations Development Programme. The festival was held in East Harbour, an old soap factory.

In 2019, the DX gave Razor Suleman the position of chief executive officer (CEO), effective immediately. The Design Exchange's collection was deaccessioned in the same year, with the institution ceasing operation of its design museum. The closure of the museum saw the Design Exchange's efforts reoriented towards the biennial EDIT event.

Also in 2019, the Design Exchange became the home of Elevate, a Canadian not-for-profit that operates an annual tech festival.

In 2022, the Design Exchange re-opened as an event venue with over 3,700 square metres (40,000 sq ft). The Design Exchange was renovated and reopened to the public in April 2023. The renovated space was redesigned to pay tribute to the building's architecture while providing a contemporary refresh.

== See also ==
- List of design museums
- Industrial design
