= MacDonald Gill =

British graphic designer, cartographer, artist, architect (1884–1947)

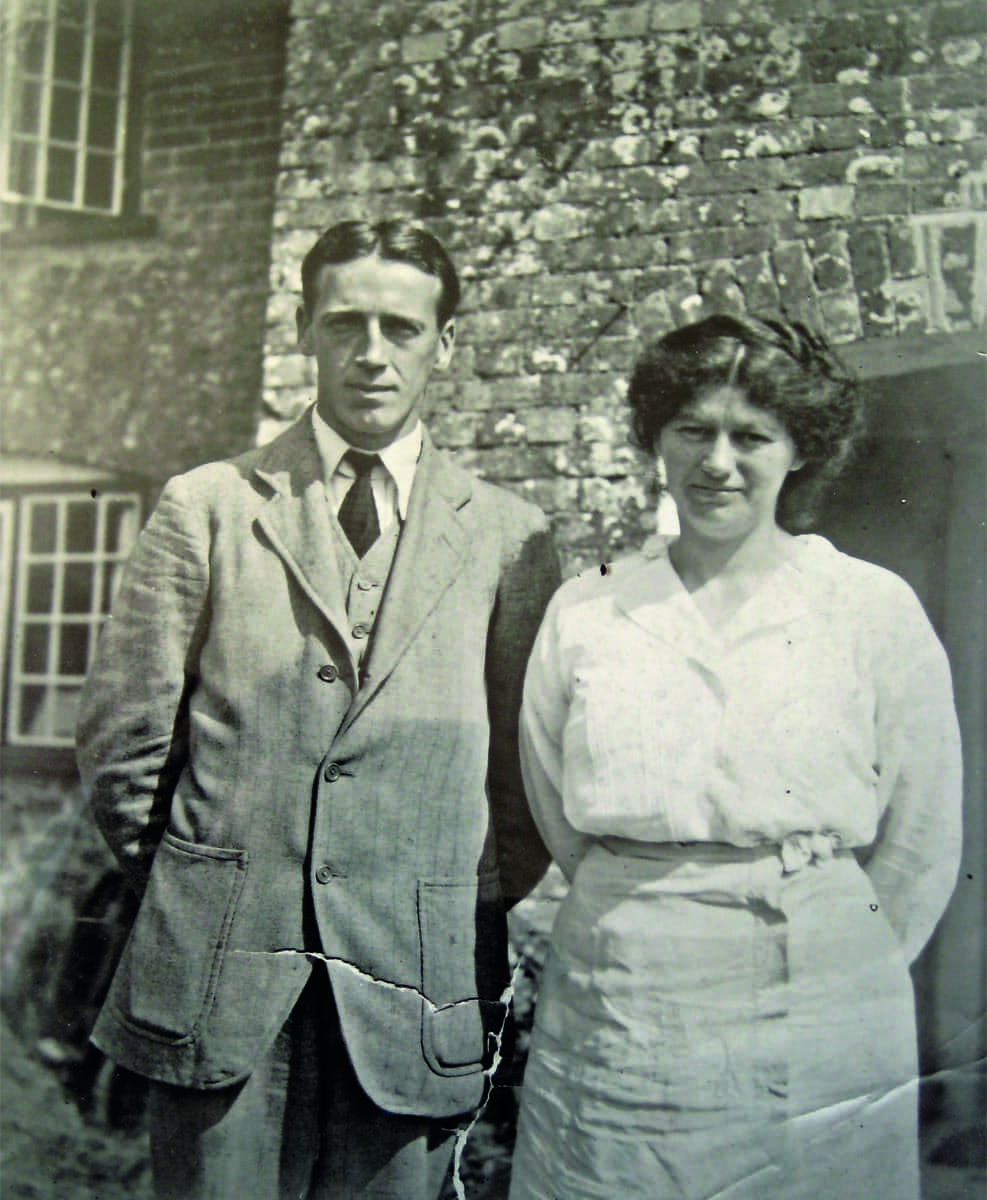
Gill with his wife Muriel, c. 1915

Leslie MacDonald Gill (6 October 1884 – 14 January 1947), commonly known as MacDonald Gill or Max Gill, was a noted early-twentieth-century British graphic designer, cartographer, artist and architect.

== Biography ==
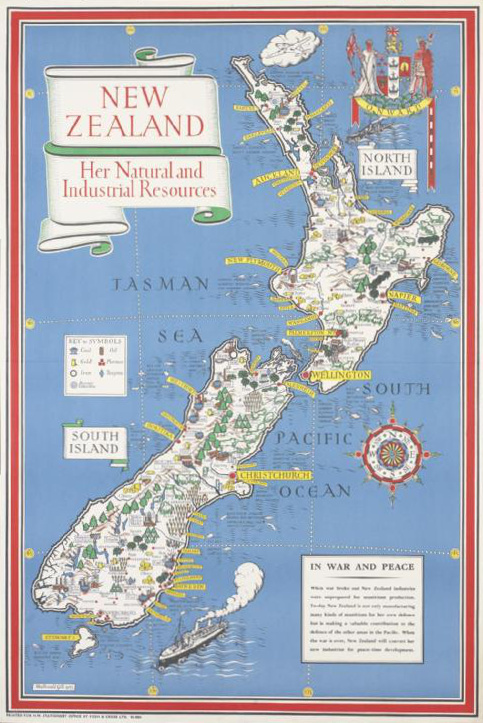
1943 map of New Zealand by MacDonald Gill

Born in Brighton, Gill was one of the 13 children of the Reverend Arthur Tidman Gill and (Cicely) Rose King (died 1929), formerly a professional singer of light opera. His older brother was Eric Gill, one of the leading figures of the Arts and Crafts movement.

In 1914, Gill's Wonderground Map, commissioned by Frank Pick, and hung at every station, helped to promote the London Underground by presenting an accurate map which also had a humorous side in cartoon style. Produced in poster form, it was also made available for sale to members of the public and proved to be very popular. Elder brother Eric, who at that time was engaged in a commission for Westminster Cathedral, was included at the bottom of the map.

Gill married Muriel Bennett in 1915, and the couple started a family. In 1919, they returned to Chichester, a childhood haunt, where he continued as a jobbing architect and artist.

In 1921, he showed three works at the first annual exhibition of the newly formed Society of Graphic Art.

He was the designer of the standard upper-case lettering used on headstones and war memorials by the Imperial War Graves Commission. But it is perhaps his illustrated maps for which he is most well known. These maps have featured in a series of exhibitions including Magnificent Maps exhibition in 2010 at the British Library, an exhibition, MacDonald Gill, Out of the Shadows, in 2011 at the University of Brighton and at the Mind the Map exhibition in 2012 at the London Transport Museum.

== Gallery ==
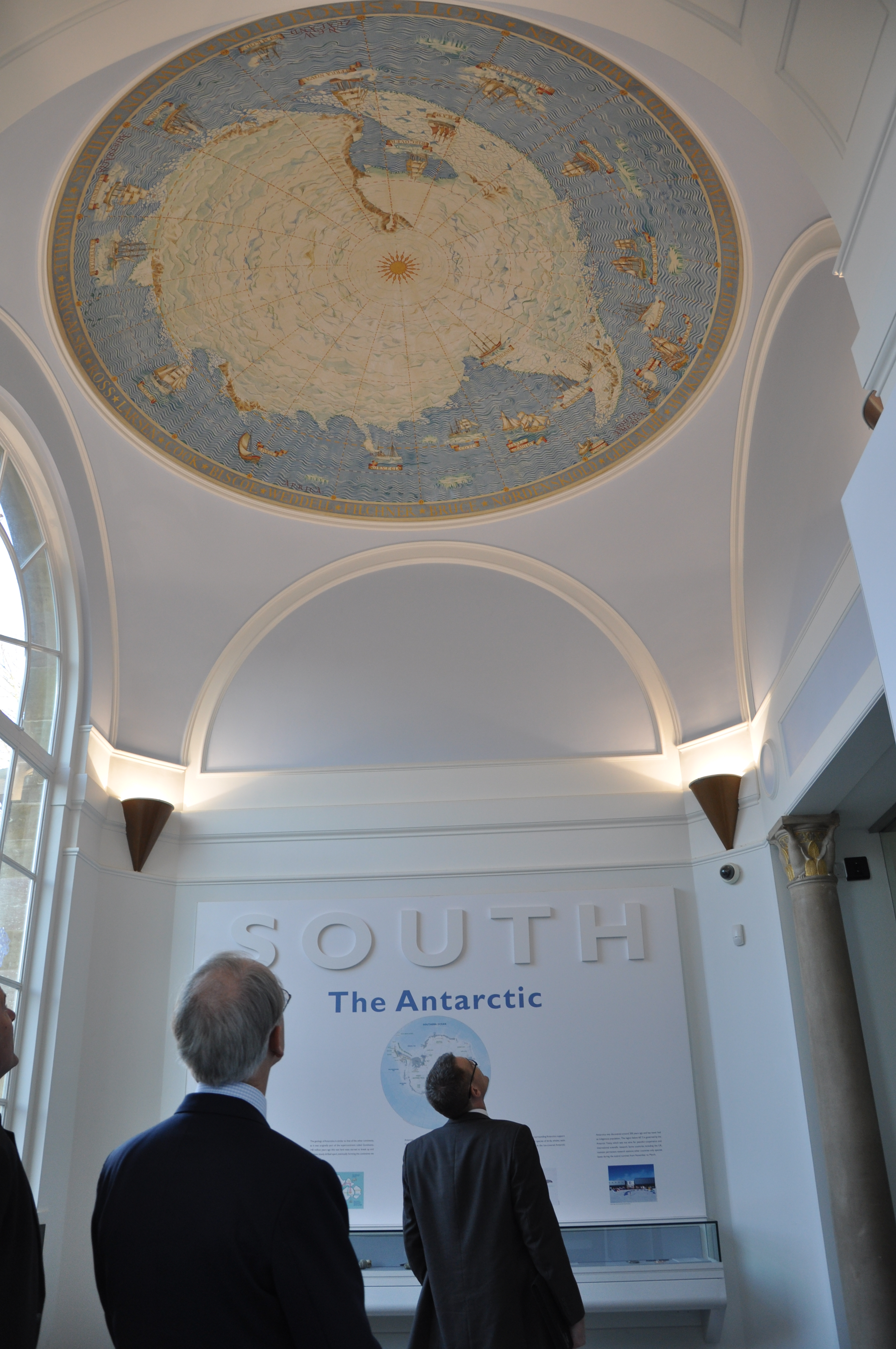
Map of the South Pole (1934) at the Scott Polar Research Institute in Cambridge

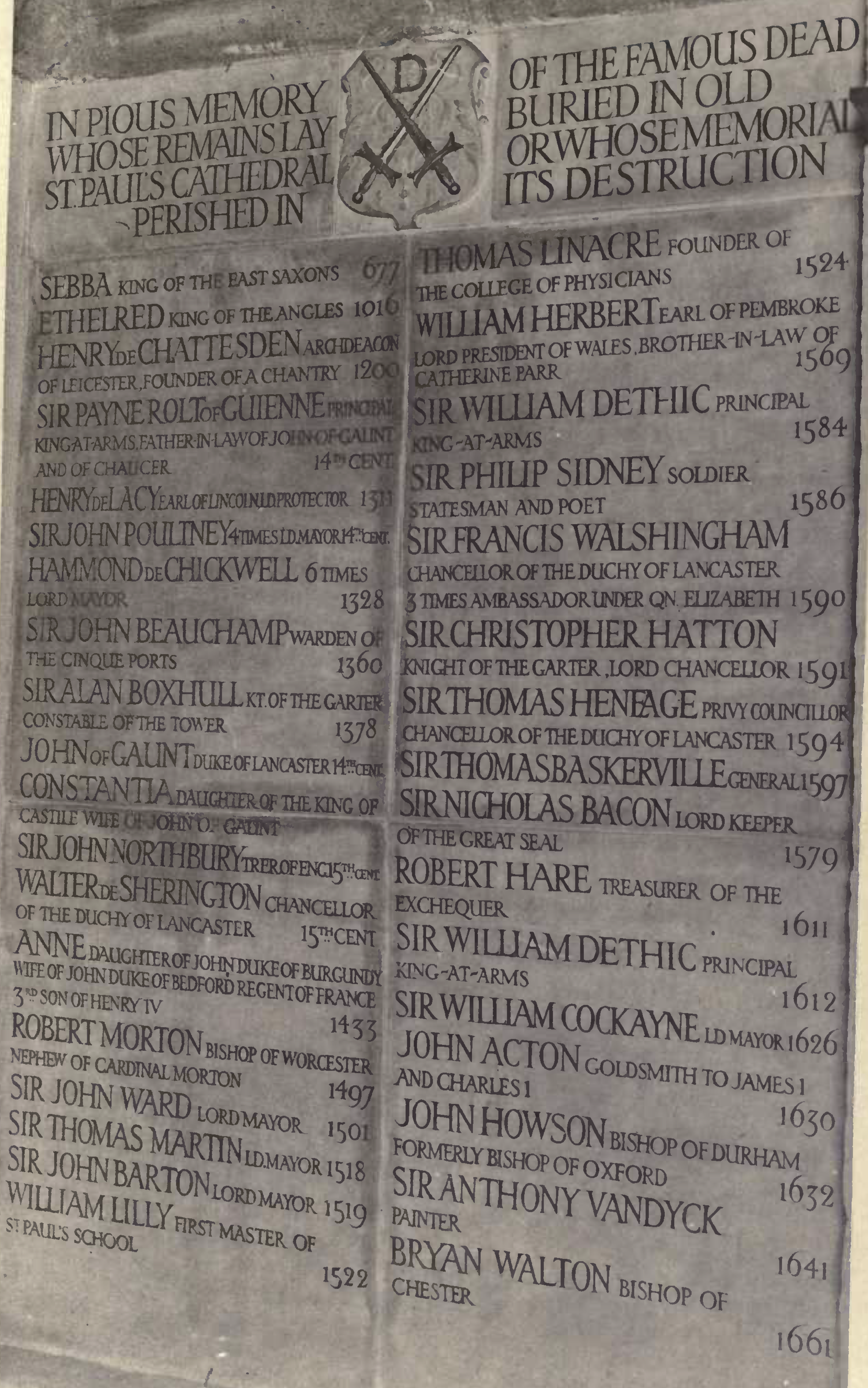
Lettering by Gill commemorating those who were buried or memorialised in Old St Paul's Cathedral but whose tombs have not survived (1 January 1913)

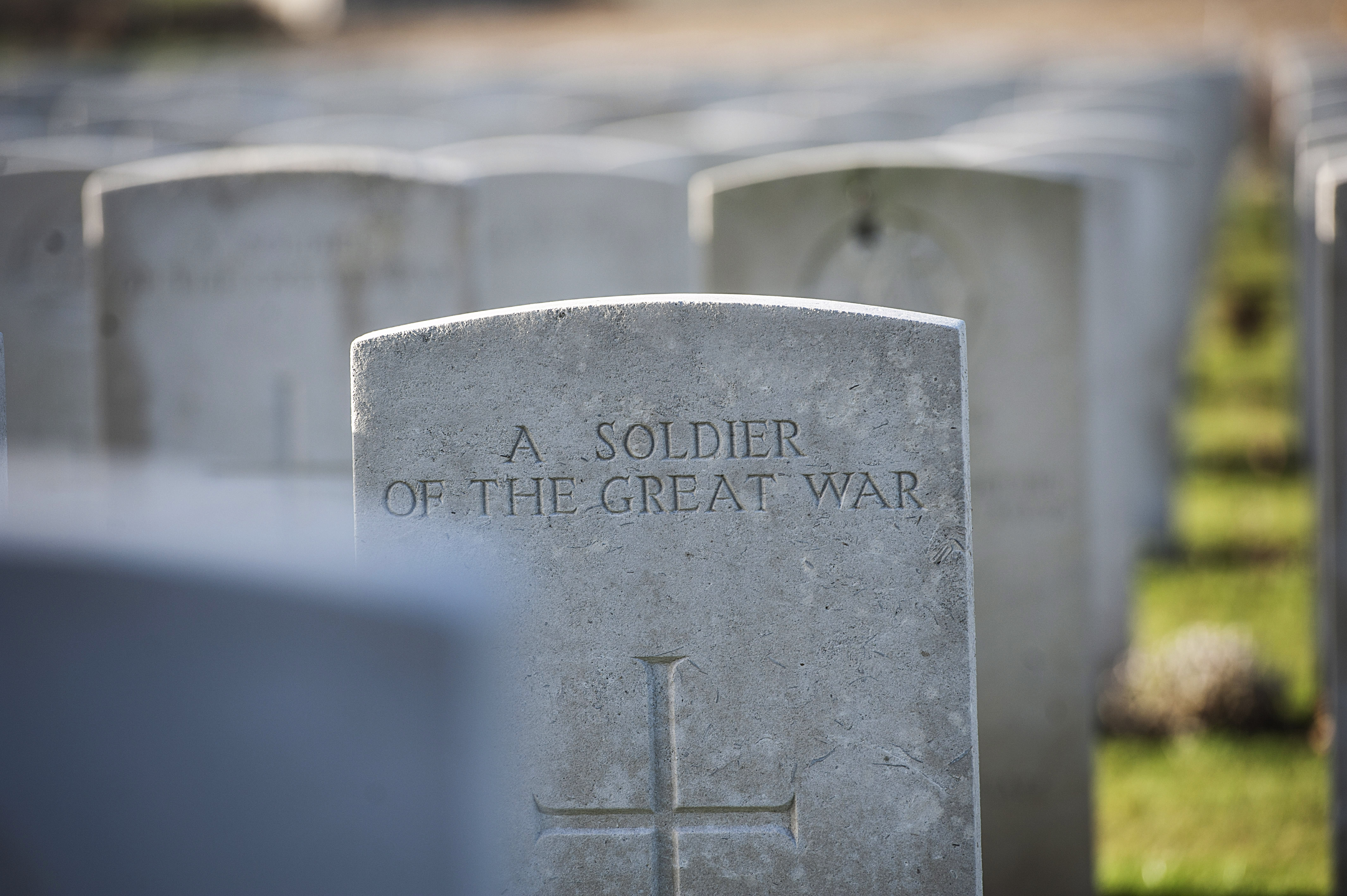
Tombstone of an unknown soldier at Tyne Cot Cemetery. The inscription uses Gill's Headstone Standard Alphabet.

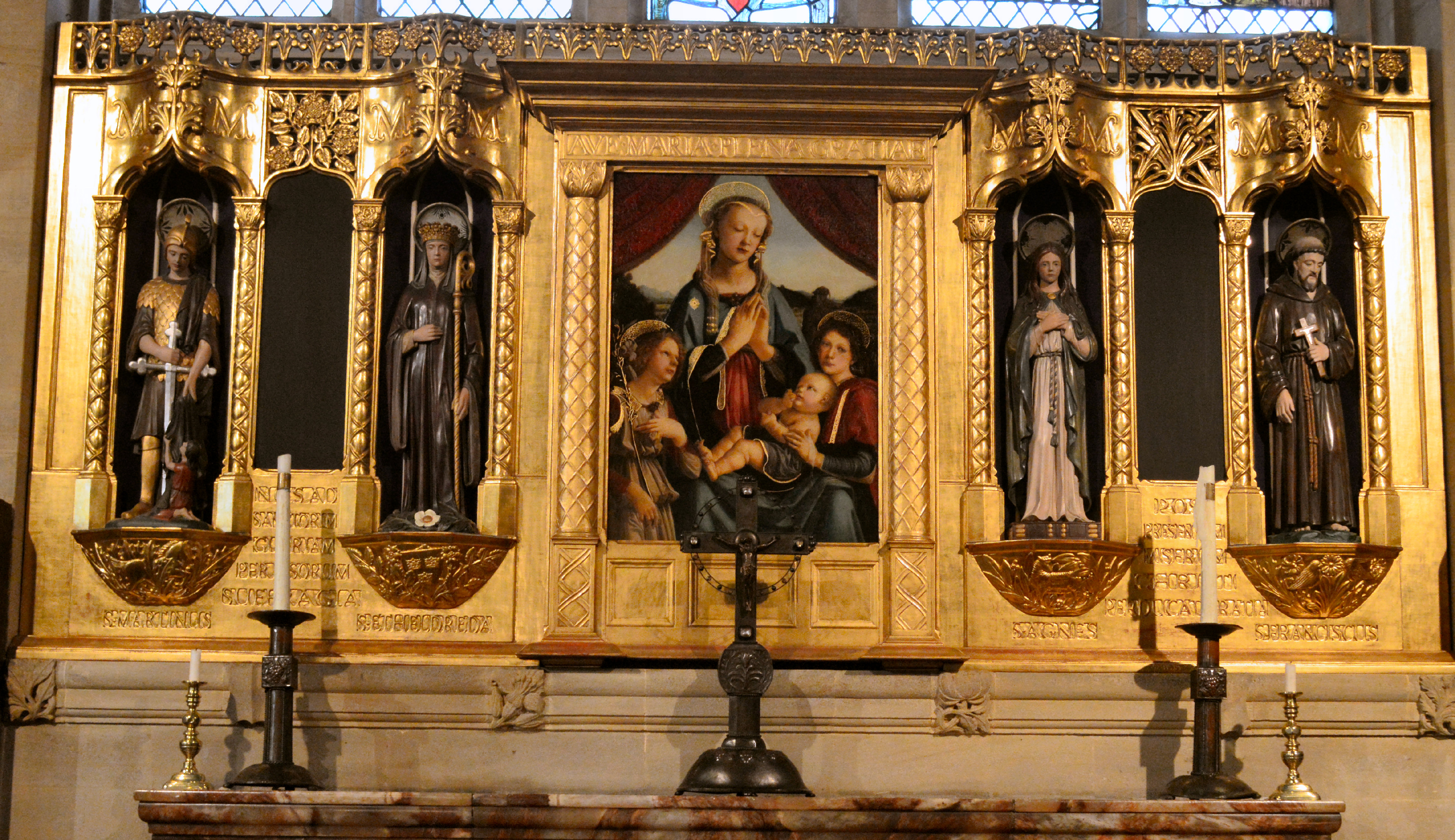
The statues in this reredos at St John the Divine, Richmond, London are by MacDonald Gill
