= Wonderground Map =

1914 map of London

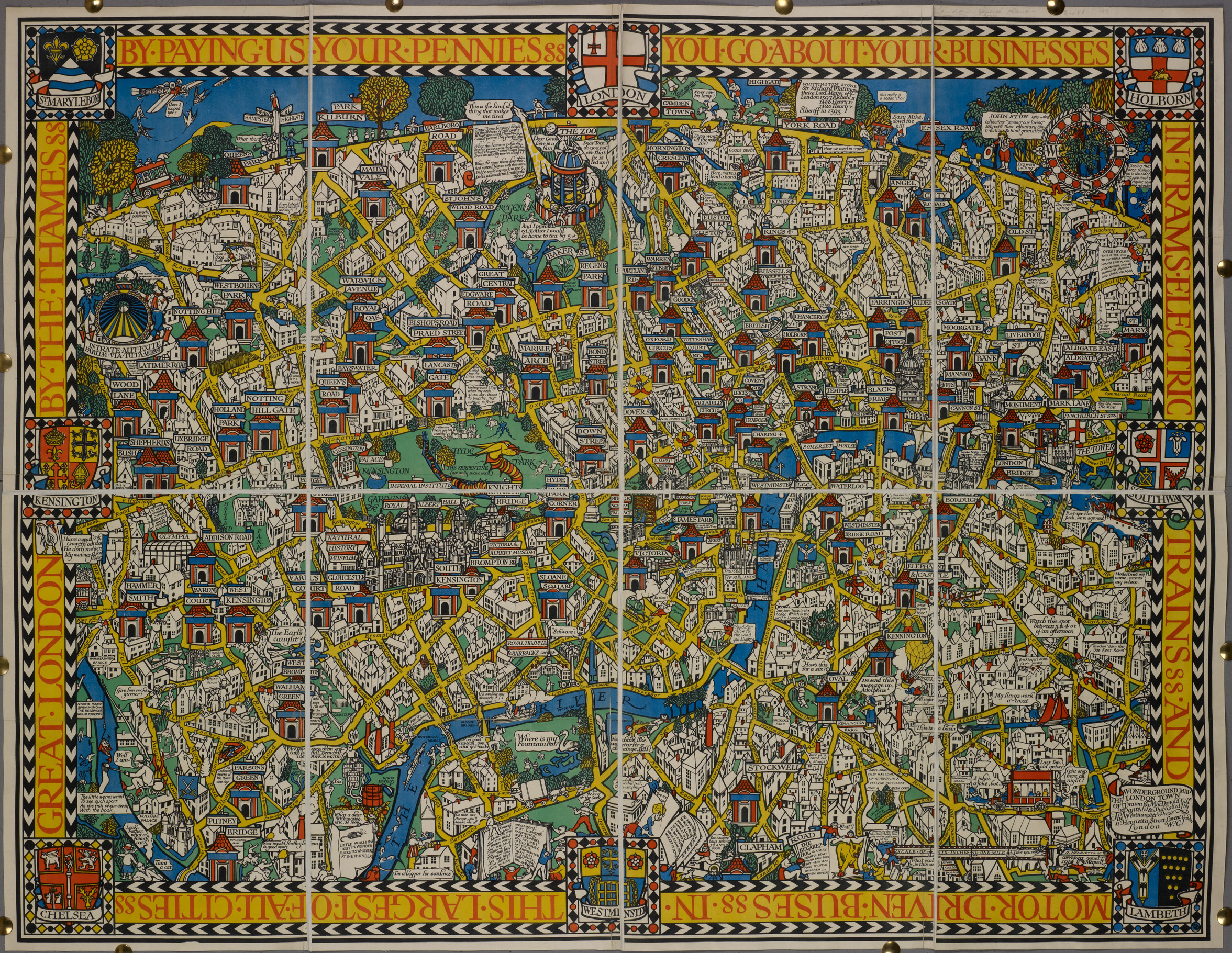
The "Wonderground Map"

The Wonderground Map (sometimes known as Wonderground) was a 1914 London Underground map designed by MacDonald Gill and commissioned for the underground by Frank Pick, Commercial Manager of the then-Underground Electric Railways Company of London. It is known today as the map which "saved" the network (described in 2016 as at that time being a "service on its knees"), by encouraging travel outside the rush hour; this was at a time when the underground was almost solely used by commuters in the mornings and evenings. Pick deliberately decided to commission a map which gave the company, as the BBC put it, a "stronger brand" as part of a simultaneous exercise in improving hygiene, punctuality, and image (if only, it has been suggested, by distracting the commuters from their travelling conditions). As part of the latter, he also commissioned the "iconic" Johnston typeface for signs and lettering at the same time. Indeed, MacDonald's older brother, Eric Gill, worked with Johnston in creating his typeface.

MacDonald was already a renowned decorative map-maker at the time of his commission. His Wonderland map has been described as a "mixture of cartoon, fantasy, and topological accuracy" and became "an instant hit with the travelling public"; using solely primary colours, London appears as a medieval town in a medieval map (for instance, using a "decorative cursive script and dotting chivalric shields" around the edge), with contemporary aspects interspersed, combined with satirical commentary on "accent, class and social mobility [that] were major preoccupations of 1914 London". MacDonald also inserted cameos of both his brother and Frank Pick; for the latter, a figure near Victoria is depicted as saying "my Pick cannot be surpassed". It has been described as a precursor to TFL's later Art on the Underground campaign and various spin-off tube maps.

== See also ==
- London Transport Museum.
