= McGill University =

Public university in Montreal, Canada

- Coat of arms
- Other name: Université McGill (French)
- Former name: McGill College or University of McGill College (1821–1885)
- Motto: Grandescunt Aucta Labore; On legend: In Domino Confido
- Motto in English: "By work, all things increase and grow"; On legend: "I trust in the Lord"
- Type: Public research university
- Established: March 31, 1821; 205 years ago
- Founder: James McGill
- Academic affiliations: AAU; ACU; AUF; BCI; CBIE; GULF; UArctic; UNAI; Universities Canada; U15
- Endowment: CA$2.782 billion
- Budget: CA$1.555 billion
- Chair: Maryse Bertrand
- Visitor: Louise Arbour (as Governor General of Canada)
- Chancellor: Pierre Boivin
- President: H. Deep Saini
- Academic staff: 3,476 (1,747 tenure-track and 1,667 non-tenure-track faculty)
- Administrative staff: 4,327
- Students: 39,920 (2024)
- Undergraduates: 27,737 (2024)
- Postgraduates: 10,072 (2024)
- Other students: 2,111 (2024)
- Location: Montreal, Quebec, Canada; 45°30′18″N 73°34′39″W
- Campus: Downtown: urban, 32 ha (80 acres); Macdonald Campus: 650 ha (1,600 acres); Outaouais Campus
- Language: English
- Newspapers: The McGill Daily; The Tribune
- Colours: McGill Red and white
- Nickname: Redbirds and Martlets
- Sporting affiliations: U Sports – RSEQ, CUFLA, NEISA
- Mascot: Marty the Martlet
- Website: www.mcgill.ca
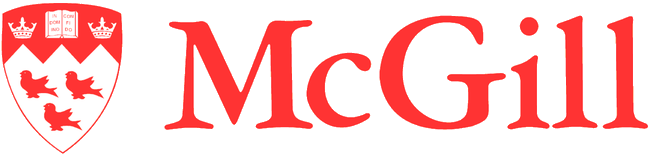

McGill University (French: Université McGill) is an English-language public research university in Montreal, Quebec, Canada. Founded in 1821 by royal charter, the university bears the name of James McGill, a Scottish merchant, whose bequest in 1813 established the University of McGill College. In 1885, the name of the university was officially changed to McGill University.

McGill has an enrolment of more than 39,000 students. The main campus is on the slope of Mount Royal in downtown Montreal in the borough of Ville-Marie, with a second campus situated in Sainte-Anne-de-Bellevue, 30 kilometres (19 mi) west of the main campus on Montreal Island. The university is one of two members of the Association of American Universities located outside the United States, alongside the University of Toronto, and is the only Canadian member of the Global University Leaders Forum (GULF) within the World Economic Forum. The university offers degrees and diplomas in over 300 fields of study. Most students are enrolled in the six largest faculties: Arts, Science, Medicine, Education, Engineering, and Management.

McGill alumni, faculty, and affiliates include 16 Nobel laureates, 149 Rhodes Scholars, 1 Turing Award winner, 3 prime ministers of Canada, 2 governors general of Canada, and 15 justices of the Supreme Court of Canada. McGill alumni also include 4 Pulitzer Prize winners and 121 Olympians with over 35 Olympic medals.

== History ==
=== Royal Institution for the Advancement of Learning ===
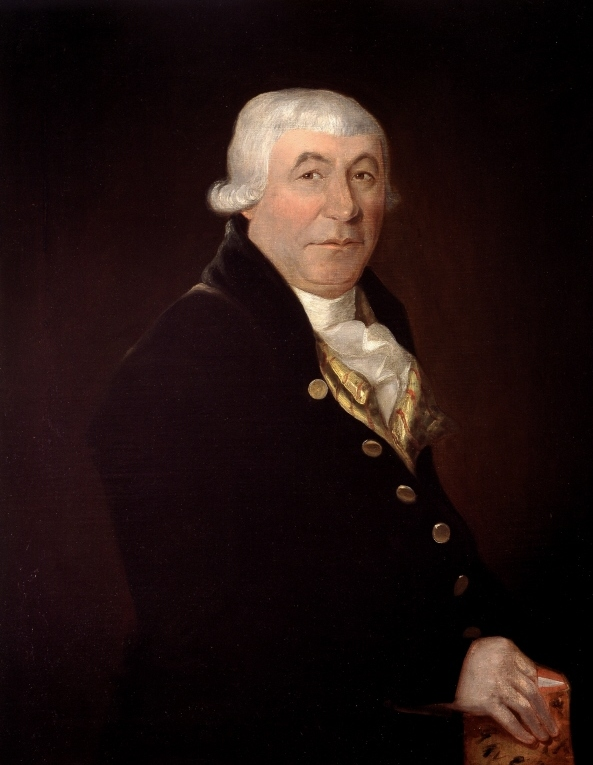
James McGill, the original benefactor of McGill University

The Royal Institution for the Advancement of Learning (RIAL) was created in 1801 under an Act of the Legislative Assembly of Lower Canada (41 George III Chapter 17), An Act for the establishment of Free Schools and the Advancement of Learning in this Province. The RIAL was initially authorized to operate two new Royal Grammar Schools, in Quebec City and in Montreal. This was a turning point for public education in Lower Canada as the schools were created by legislation, which showed the government's willingness to support the costs of education and even the salary of a schoolmaster. This was an important first step in the creation of non-denominational schools. When James McGill died in 1813, his bequest was administered by the RIAL.

In 1846, the Royal Grammar School in Quebec City closed, and the one in Montreal merged with the High School of Montreal. By the mid-19th century, the RIAL had lost control of the other eighty-two grammar schools it had administered. However, in 1853 it took over the High School of Montreal from the school's board of directors and continued to operate it until 1870. Thereafter, its sole remaining purpose was to administer the McGill bequest on behalf of the private college. The RIAL continues to exist today; it is the corporate identity that runs the university and its various constituent bodies, including the former Macdonald College (now Macdonald Campus), the Montreal Neurological Institute, and the Royal Victoria College (the former women's college turned residence). Since the revised Royal Charter of 1852, the trustees of the RIAL are the board of governors of McGill University.

=== McGill College ===
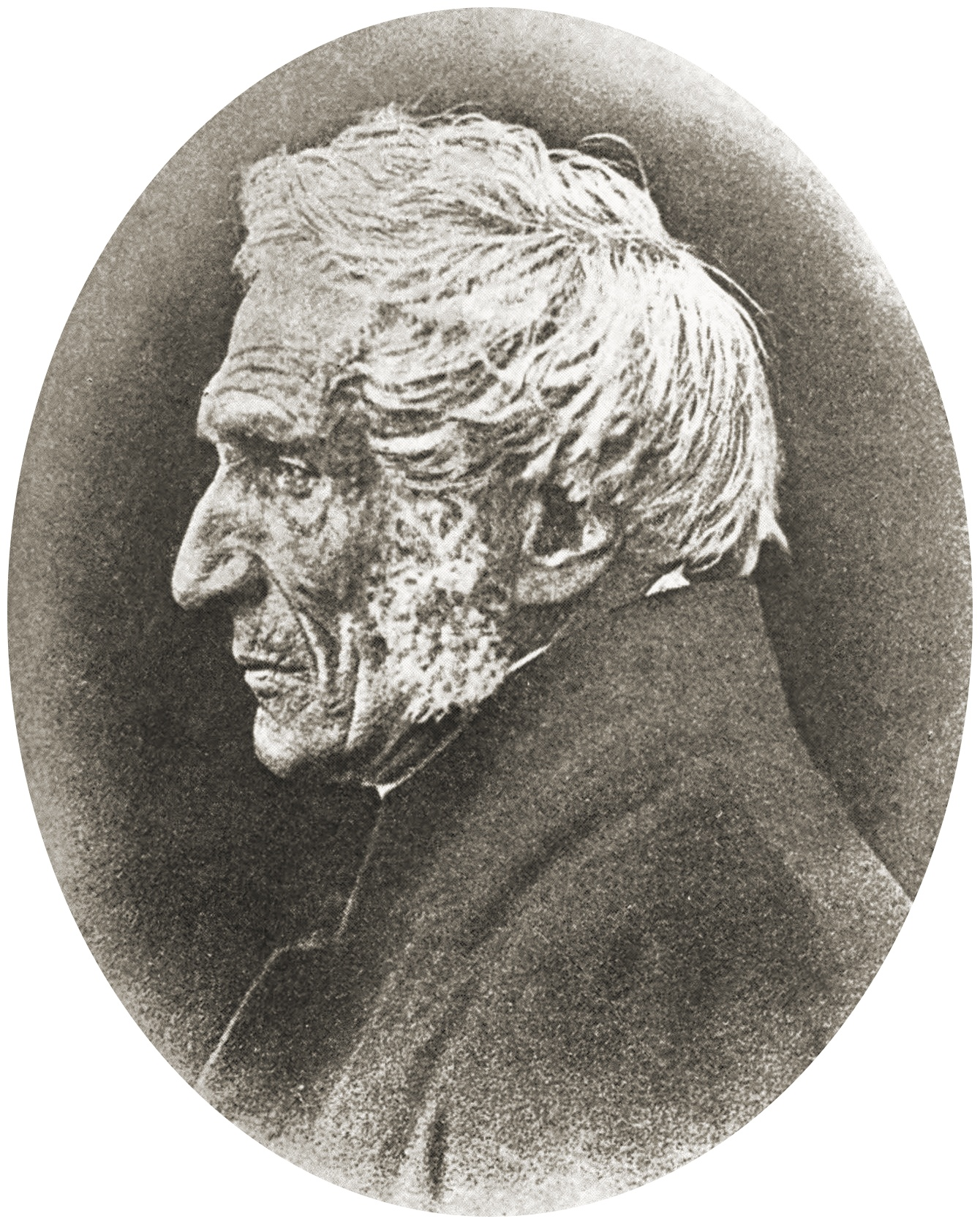
The first Principal of McGill College, The Rt. Rev. George Mountain

James McGill was born in Glasgow, Scotland, on October 6, 1744. He was a successful merchant in Quebec, having matriculated into the University of Glasgow in 1756. Soon afterwards, McGill left for North America to explore the business opportunities there, especially in the fur trade. McGill was also a slave owner, and the McGill household enslaved at least five Black and Indigenous people. Between 1811 and 1813, he drew up a will leaving his "Burnside estate", a 19-hectare (47-acre) tract of rural land and £10,000 to the Royal Institution for the Advancement of Learning.

As a condition of the bequest, the land and funds had to be used for the establishment of a "University or College, for the purposes of Education and the Advancement of Learning in the said Province." The will specified a private, constituent college bearing his name would have to be established within ten years of his death; otherwise, the bequest would revert to the heirs of his wife.

On March 31, 1821, after protracted legal battles with the Desrivières family (the heirs of his wife), McGill College received a royal charter from King George IV. The charter provided the college should be deemed and taken as a University, with the power of conferring degrees. The third Lord Bishop of Quebec, The Right Reverend George Mountain, (DCL, Oxford) was appointed the first principal of McGill College and a professor of divinity. He is also responsible for the creation of Bishop's University in 1843 and Bishop's College School in 1836 in the Eastern Townships.

=== University development ===
==== Campus expansions ====
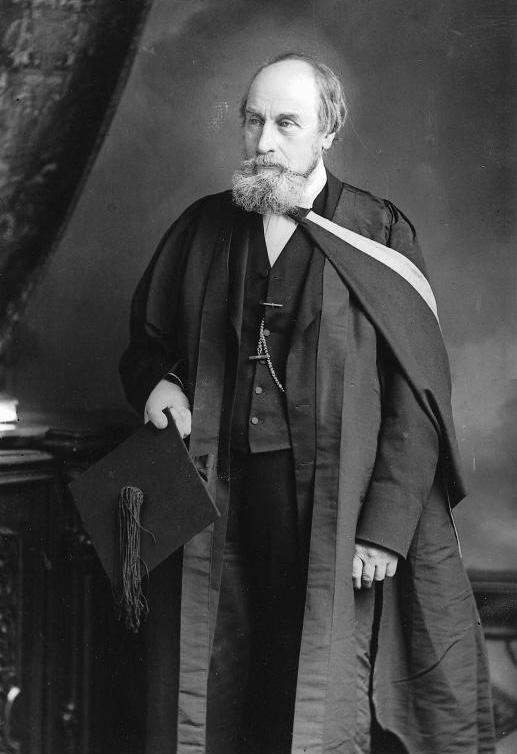
Sir John William Dawson, Principal of McGill University, 1855–1893

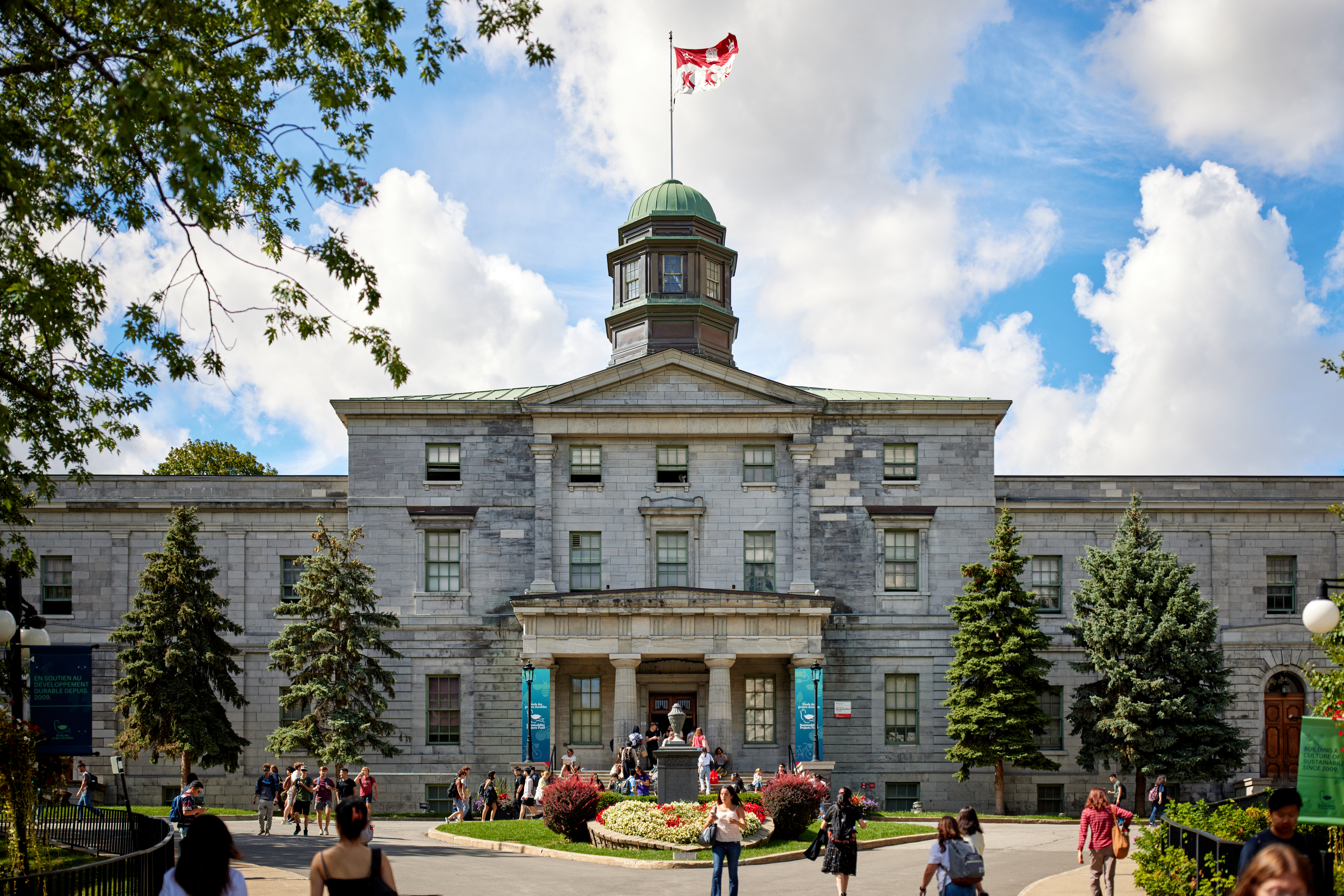
The Arts Building, completed in 1843 and designed by John Ostell, is the oldest existing building on campus.

Although McGill College received its Royal Charter in 1821, it was inactive until 1829 when the Montreal Medical Institution, which had been founded in 1823, became the college's first academic unit and Canada's first medical school. The Faculty of Medicine granted its first degree, a Doctorate of Medicine and Surgery, in 1833; this was also the first medical degree to be awarded in Canada.

The Faculty of Medicine remained the school's only functioning faculty until 1843 when the Faculty of Arts commenced teaching in the newly constructed Arts Building and East Wing (Dawson Hall).

The Faculty of Law was founded in 1848 and is also the oldest of its kind in the nation. In 1896, the McGill School of Architecture was the second architecture school to be established in Canada, six years after the University of Toronto in 1890. Sir John William Dawson, McGill's principal from 1855 to 1893, is often credited with transforming the school into a modern University.

William Spier designed the addition of the West Wing of the Arts Building for William Molson, 1861. Alexander Francis Dunlop designed major alterations to the East Wing of McGill College (now called the Arts Building, McGill University) for Prof. Bovey and the Science Dept., 1888. George Allan Ross designed the Pathology Building, 1922–23; the Neurological Institute, 1933; Neurological Institute addition 1938 at McGill University. Jean Julien Perrault (architect) designed the McTavish Street residence for Charles E. Gravel, which is now called David Thompson House (1934).

==== Women's education ====
Women's education at McGill began in 1884 when Donald Smith (later the Lord Strathcona and Mount Royal), began funding separate lectures for women, given by University staff members. The first degrees granted to women at McGill were conferred in 1888. In 1899, the Royal Victoria College (RVC) opened as a residential college for women at McGill with Hilda D. Oakeley as the head. Until the 1970s, all female undergraduate students, known as "Donaldas," were considered to be members of RVC. Beginning in the autumn of 2010, the newer Tower section of Royal Victoria College became a mixed gender dormitory, whereas the older West Wing remains strictly for women. Both the Tower and the West Wing of Royal Victoria College form part of the university's residence system.

=== McGill and World War I ===
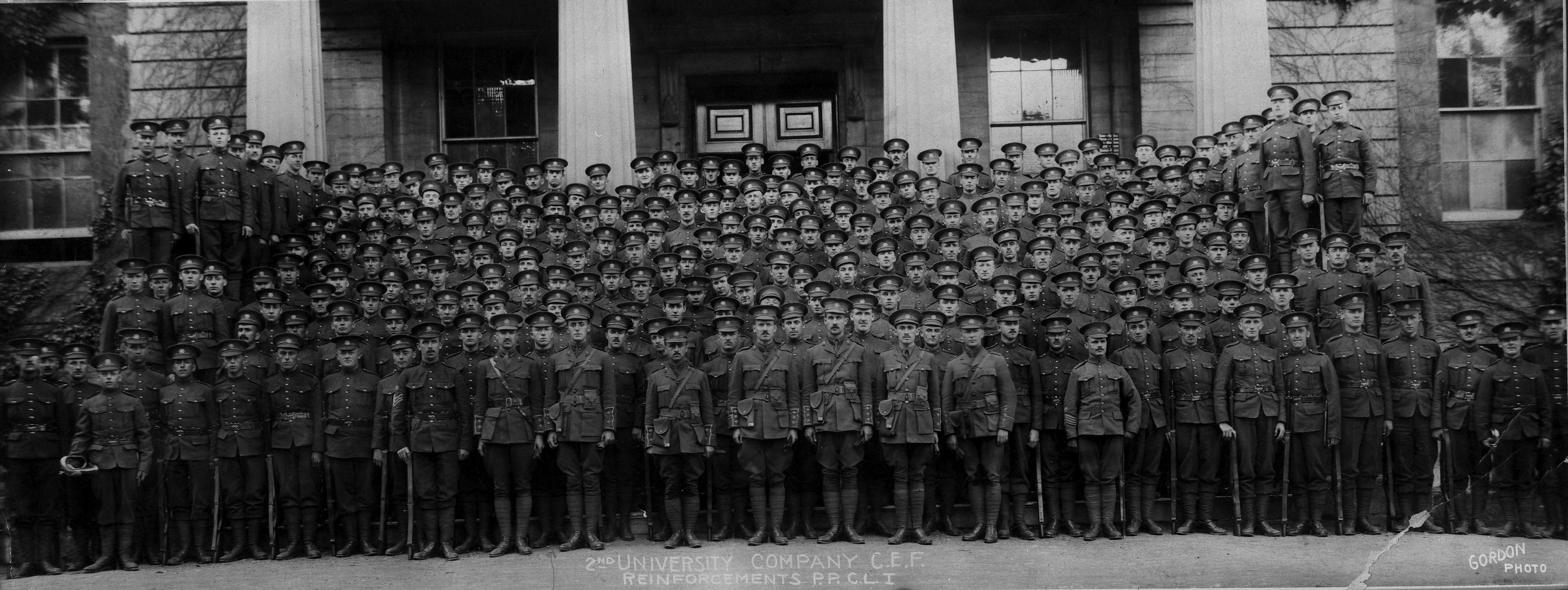
The Second University Company prior to their departure for France

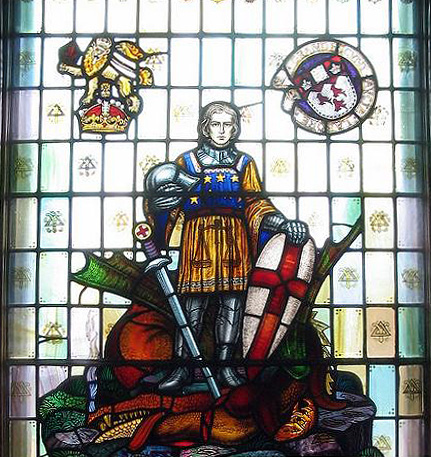
Stained Glass Great War Memorial entrance to the Blackader-Lauterman Library of Architecture and Art

Many students and alumni enlisted in the first wave of patriotic fervour that swept the nation in 1914 at the outbreak of World War I, but in the spring of 1915—after the first wave of heavy Canadian casualties at Ypres—Hamilton Gault, the founder of the Canadian regiment and a wealthy Montreal businessman, was faced with a desperate shortage of troops. When he reached out to his friends at home for support, over two hundred were commissioned from the ranks, and many more would serve as soldiers throughout the war. On their return to Canada after the war, Major George McDonald and Major George Currie formed the accounting firm McDonald Currie, which later became one of the founders of Price Waterhouse Coopers. Captain Percival Molson was killed in action in July 1917. Percival Molson Memorial Stadium at McGill is named in his honour.

The War Memorial Hall (more generally known as Memorial Hall) is a landmark building on the campus of McGill University. At the dedication ceremony, the Governor General of Canada (Harold Alexander, 1st Earl Alexander of Tunis) laid the cornerstone. Dedicated on October 6, 1946, the Memorial Hall and adjoining Memorial Pool honour students who had enlisted and died in the First World War, and in the Second World War. In Memorial Hall, there are two Stained Glass Regimental badges, World War I and World War II Memorial Windows by Charles William Kelsey c. 1950/1.

A war memorial window (1950) by Charles William Kelsey in the McGill War Memorial Hall depicts the figure of St. Michael and the badges of the Navy, Army and the Air Force. A Great War memorial window featuring Saint George and a slain dragon at the entrance to the Blackader-Lauterman Library of Architecture and Art is dedicated to the memory of 23 members of the McGill chapter of Delta Upsilon who gave their lives in the Great War.

There is a memorial archway at Macdonald Campus, two additional floors added to the existing Sir Arthur Currie gymnasium, a hockey rink and funding for an annual Memorial Assembly. A Book of Remembrance on a marble table contains the names of those lost in both World Wars. On November 11, 2012, the McGill Remembers website launched; the University War Records Office collected documents between 1940 and 1946 related to McGill students, staff and faculty in the Second World War.

=== Founder of universities and colleges ===
McGill was instrumental in founding several major universities and colleges. It established the first post-secondary institutions in British Columbia to provide degree programs to the growing cities of Vancouver and Victoria. It chartered Victoria College in 1903 as an affiliated junior college of McGill, offering first and second-year courses in arts and science, until it became today's University of Victoria. British Columbia's first University was incorporated in Vancouver in 1908 as the McGill University College of British Columbia. The private institution granted McGill degrees until it became the independent University of British Columbia in 1915.

Dawson College began in 1945 as a satellite campus of McGill to absorb the anticipated influx of students after World War II. Many students in their first three years in the Faculty of Engineering took courses at Dawson College to relieve the McGill campus for the later two years for their degree course. Dawson eventually became independent of McGill and evolved into the first English CEGEP in Quebec. Another CEGEP, John Abbott College, was established in 1971 at the campus of McGill's Macdonald College.

Both founders of the University of Alberta, Premier Alexander Cameron Rutherford of Alberta and Henry Marshall Tory, were also McGill alumni. In addition, McGill alumni and professors, Sir William Osler and Howard Atwood Kelly, were among the four founders and early faculty members of the Johns Hopkins University School of Medicine. Osler eventually became the first Physician-in-Chief of the new Johns Hopkins Hospital in Baltimore, Maryland, US in 1889. He led the creation of the Johns Hopkins University School of Medicine in 1893. Other McGill alumni founded the Schulich School of Medicine & Dentistry in the 1880s. By 1961, McGill had an enrolment of 8,507 students and 925 graduate students. Since the 1960s McGill has experienced government funding curtailment. According to a 2016 report, McGill had a $1.3 billion deferred maintenance bill. The report also identified that 73 per cent of the university's buildings were in poor or very poor shape.

=== Controversies of the 20th and 21st century ===
==== Quotas on Jewish students ====
McGill University, alongside other universities like Sir George Williams University (now part of Concordia University) and the University of Toronto Faculty of Medicine, had longstanding quotas in place from 1920 to the late 1960s on the number of Jews admitted to the respective universities. The quota limited the Jewish student population in medicine and law to at most 10 per cent. The only Montreal-based university that did not impose such quotas was the Université de Montréal.

==== Involvement in MKUltra and Human Experimentation ====
On June 1, 1951, representatives of the Central Intelligence Agency of the United States (CIA) held a meeting at the Ritz-Carlton Montreal hotel with British and Canadian officials with the aim of discussing intelligence regarding rumours of brainwashing techniques developed by the Soviet Union. One guest at the meeting was Donald O. Hebb, director of McGill University's psychology program: during the meeting, he suggested that the Soviets were able to manipulate prisoners through sensory deprivation techniques and the use of isolation. Three months later, Hebb received a grant from the Canadian Department of National Defence to conduct classified sensory deprivation experiments: these initial experiments, conducted on students at the university, were voluntary and paid their subjects 20 dollars per day. The experiments proved fruitful, as Hebb was able to make students who previously trusted in science now believing that it was dishonest, as well as being convinced of the existence of ghosts.

Prior to conducting the experiments, Hebb had initially been under the impression that his work was meant to eventually train soldiers to resist these techniques when captured, but realized early on that it also had implications for interrogation, as it made potential interrogatees more prone to suggestion. Four of the subjects had also remarked during the experiments that they were experiencing torture; none of the subjects experienced more than two to three days of isolation, as Hebb was concerned about the scientific ethics of continuing the experiments for a longer period of time. In spite of this, beginning in 1957 and with significant financial support from the CIA, fellow McGill researcher Donald Ewen Cameron sought to explore the effects of one to two months of continuous isolation and sensory deprivation. Privately, Cameron indicated that his ultimate goal was to seemingly rewrite the human mind.

Rather than conducting voluntary experiments, Cameron instead tested on patients at the university's Allan Memorial Institute without their consent, even when they had only complained of minor issues such as anxiety. Cameron also combined the techniques with enhanced electroconvulsive therapy to cause amnesia, shocking the patients twelve times per day for a month (compared to the recommended dosage of six times per day for four days). To further induce suggestibility, he dosed them with a large amount of drugs without their knowledge, including LSD and PCP. With the university's consent, he partially renovated the institute building to expand his experiments, including adding a soundproofed pitch-black room to the basement and remodeling the horse stables into specialized "isolation boxes" with a similar structure. The latter had patients kept within them for weeks at a time, with one patient being kept there for 35 consecutive days. Cameron also maintained "sleep rooms:" there, patients would be induced to sleep for 20 to 22 hours per day, being turned over by the institute's nurses every two hours to prevent bed sores and only wakened for meals or to use the washroom. The nurses were not allowed to tell or indicate to the patients in any way how long they had been in the room, nor were the patients permitted to speak to the nurses. In most cases, patients in the sleep rooms would spend between 15 and 30 days there, though the stays could span as much as 65 days. Lastly, to prevent one group of patients from leaving their room, Cameron dosed them with curare, paralyzing them until the experiment was over. The experiments were funded until 1961; they were then directly cited by the CIA in a 1963 interrogation techniques manual, which explicitly clarified that the techniques themselves were illegal and required approval from superior officers.

In January 2019, Julie Tanny filed a class-action lawsuit on behalf of her deceased father, Charles Tanny, suing the U.S. federal government, the Government of Canada, and McGill University as defendants. In a statement, the university denied responsibility, claiming that Cameron was an independent employee. On October 2, 2023, following an appeal, the claims against the U.S. government were dismissed with prejudice by the Quebec Court of Appeal due to sovereign immunity. The claims against the remaining defendants were certified as a class-action lawsuit on July 31, 2025.

==== Controversial protests and initiatives ====
McGill University was the subject of controversy when in January 2023, McGill University's Centre for Human Rights and Legal Pluralism (CHRLP) hosted an event, titled "Sex vs. Gender (Identity) Debate In the United Kingdom and the Divorce of LGB from T". It was led by McGill alumnus Robert Wintemute. Transgender activist groups stormed the talk, which was led by a speaker associated with a group they claimed was "notoriously transphobic and trans-exclusionary." The talk was cancelled shortly after it started.

On October 10, 2025, the McGill University Association of University Professors (MAUT) made the decision to implement an academic and cultural boycott of Israel. The resolution mandated that McGill cease its partnerships with Israeli universities.

== Campus ==
=== Downtown campus ===
McGill's main campus is located in downtown Montreal at the foot of Mount Royal. Most of its buildings are in a park-like campus (also known as the Lower Campus) north of Sherbrooke Street and south of Pine Avenue between Peel and Aylmer streets. The campus extends west of Peel Street (also known as Upper Campus) for several blocks, starting north of Doctor Penfield; the campus also streches east of University Street, starting north of Pine Avenue, an area that includes McGill's Percival Molson Memorial Stadium and the Montreal Neurological Institute and Hospital. The community immediately east of University Street and south of Pine Avenue is known as Milton-Park, where a large number of students reside. The campus is near the Peel and McGill Metro stations. A major downtown boulevard, McGill College Avenue, leads up to the Roddick Gates, the university's formal entrance. Many of the major University buildings were constructed using local grey limestone, which serves as a unifying element. A number of these buildings are connected by indoor tunnels.

The university's first classes were held in at Burnside Place, James McGill's country home. Burnside Place remained the sole educational facility until the 1840s, when the school began construction on its first buildings: the central and east wings of the Arts Building. The rest of the campus was essentially a cow pasture, a situation similar to the few other Canadian universities and early American colleges of the age.

The university's athletic facilities, including Molson Stadium, are on Mount Royal, near the residence halls and the Montreal Neurological Institute. The Gymnasium is named in honour of General Sir Arthur William Currie.

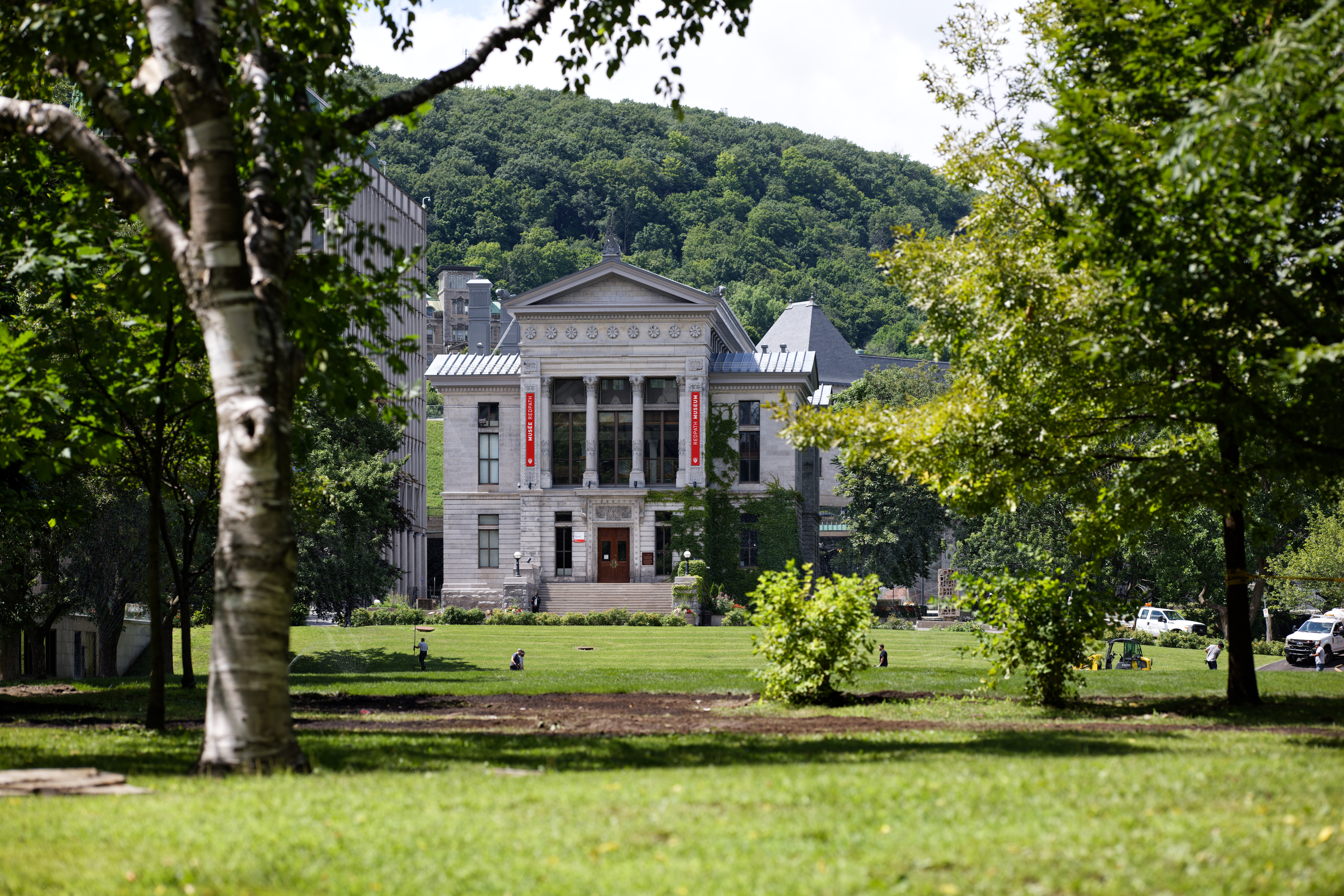
The Redpath Museum, built in 1882

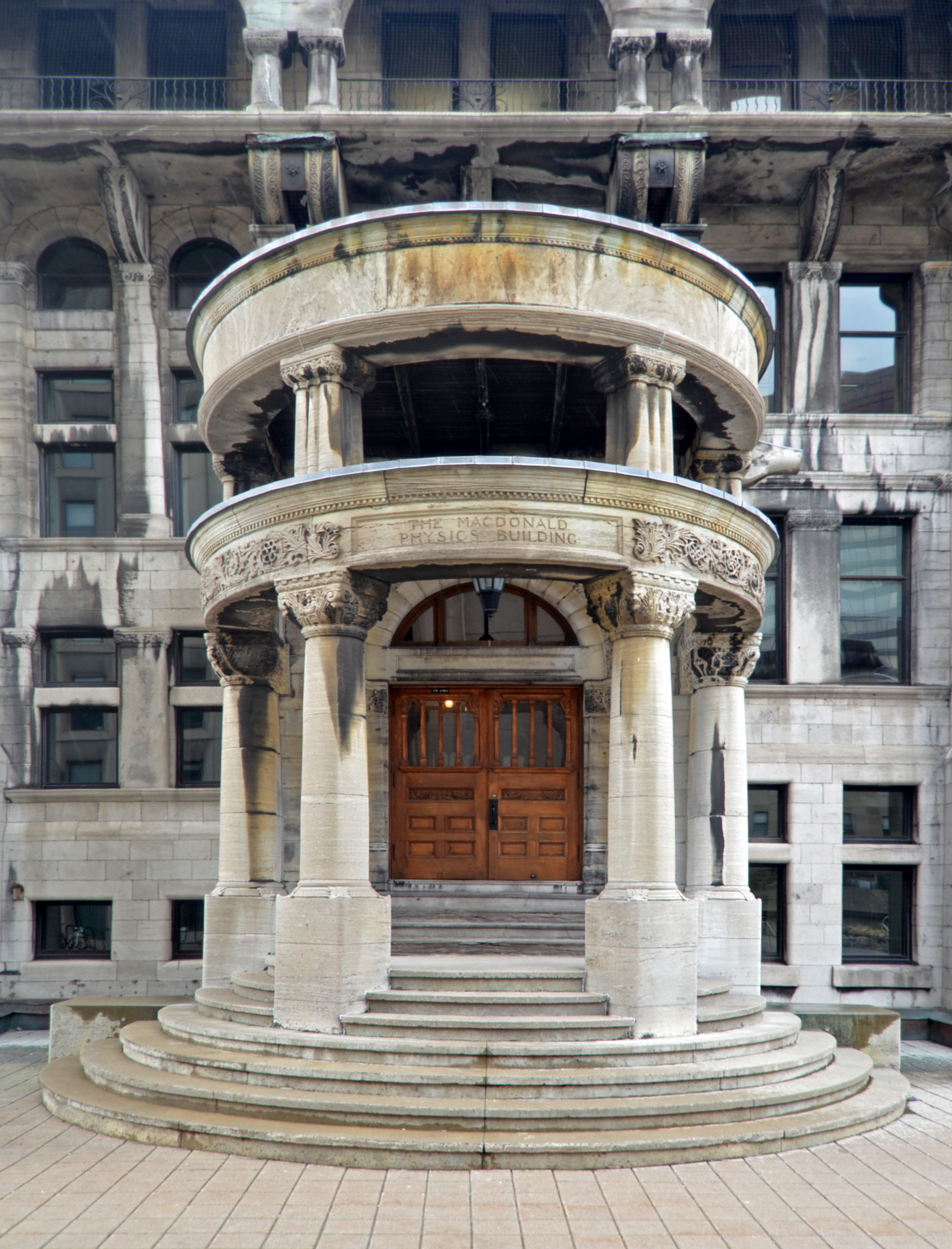
The Macdonald-Stewart Library Building, opened in 1893

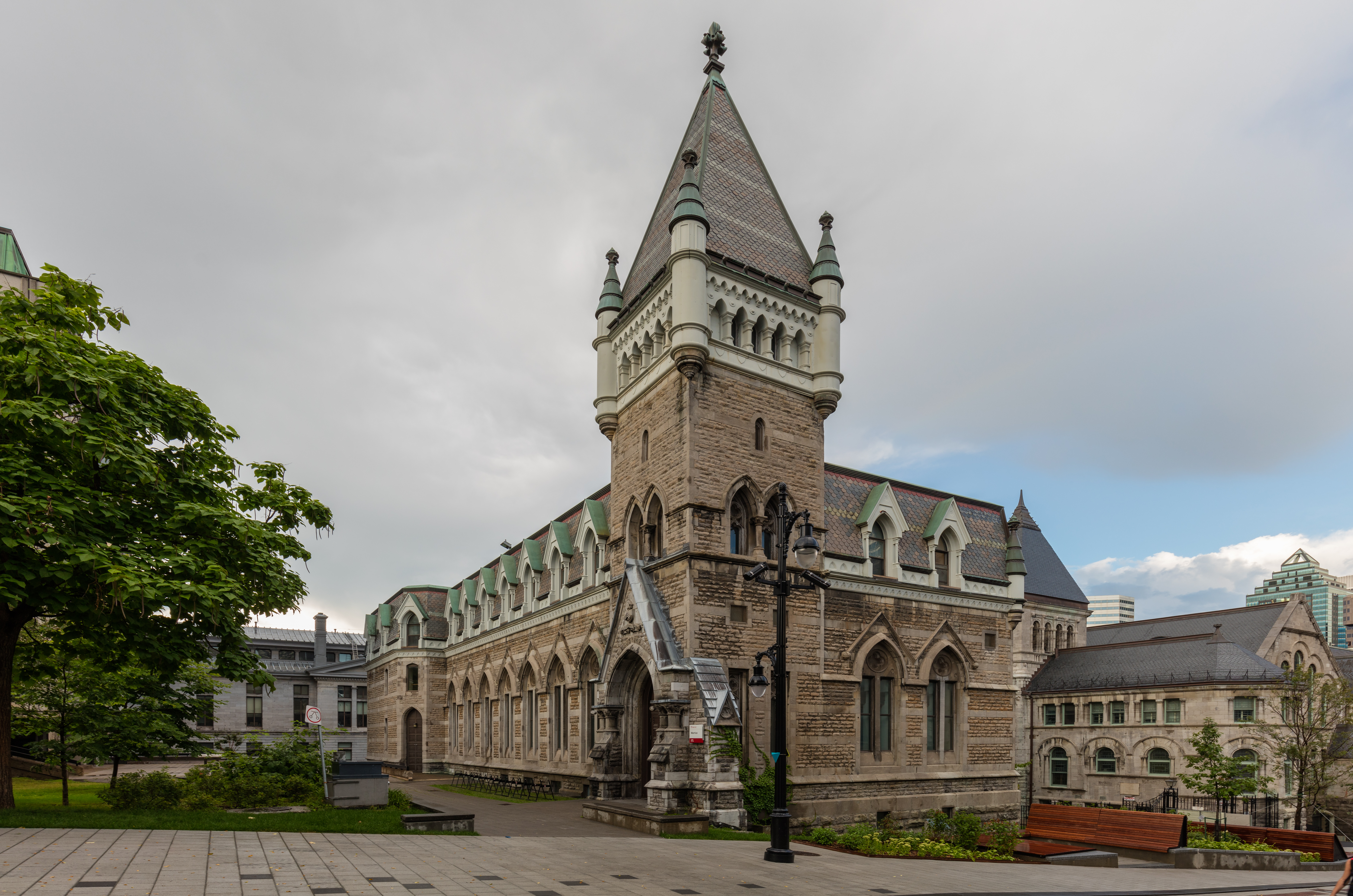
Morrice Hall, completed in 1882

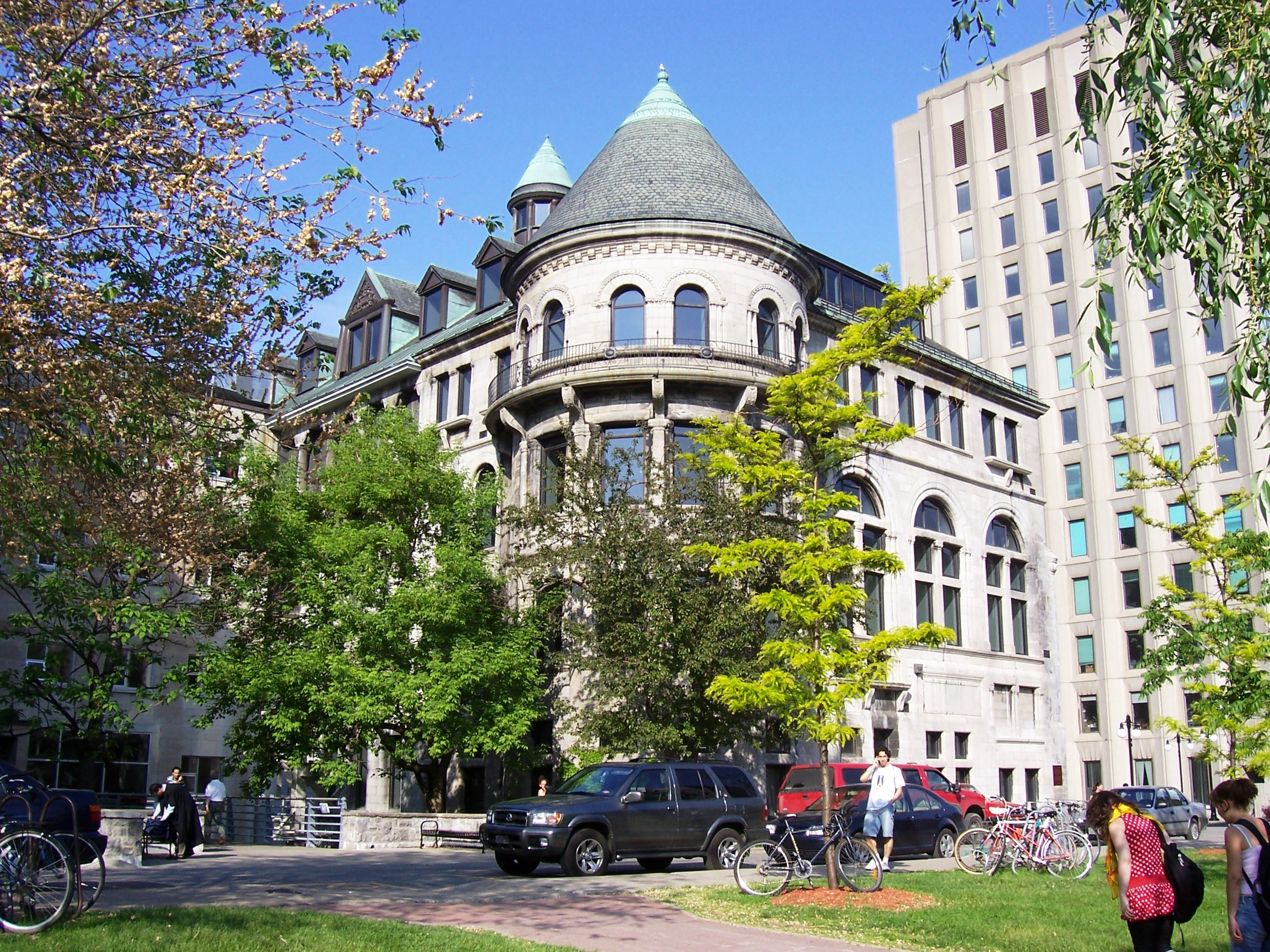
MacDonald-Harrington Building, built between 1896 and 1897

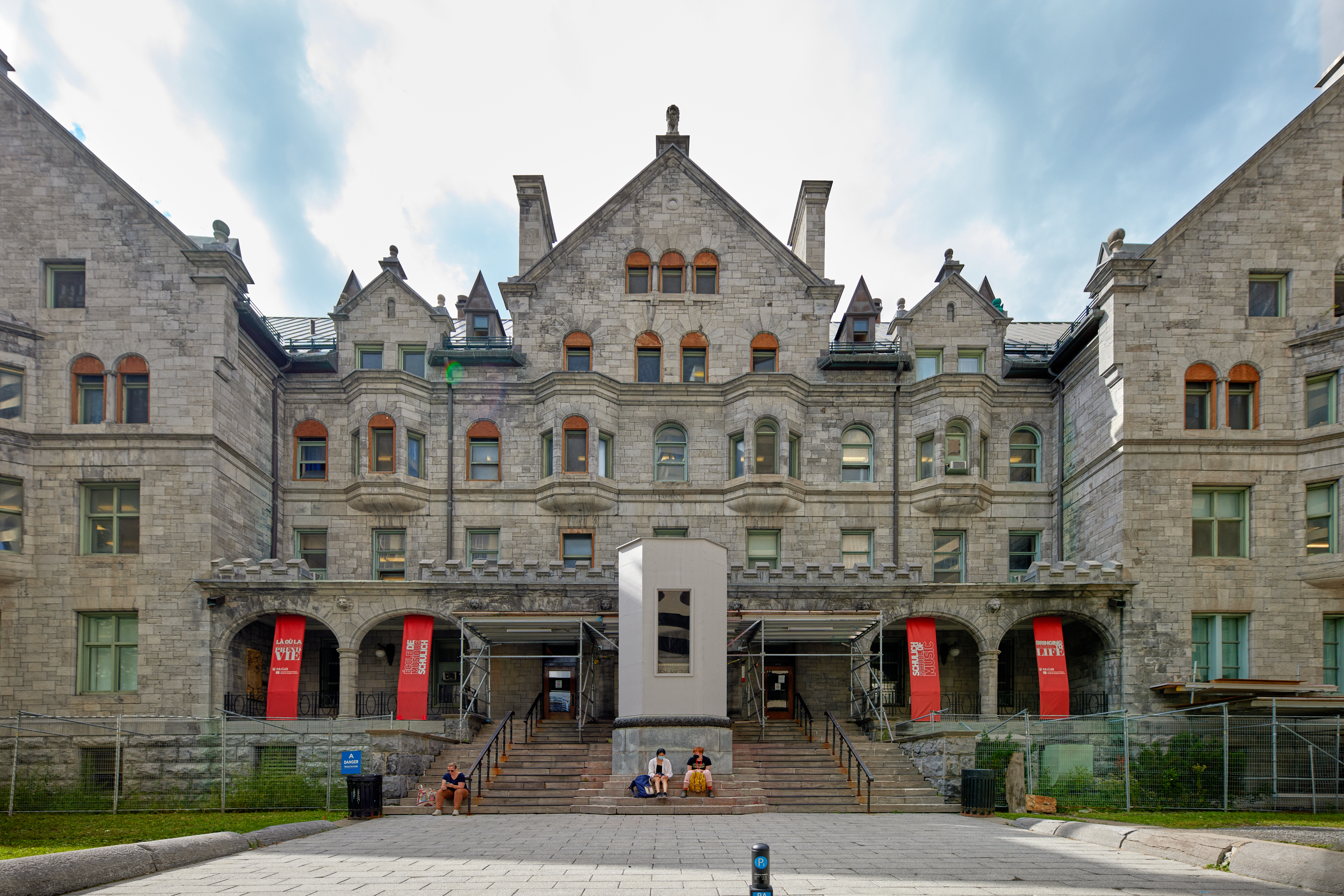
Strathcona Music Building, built in 1895

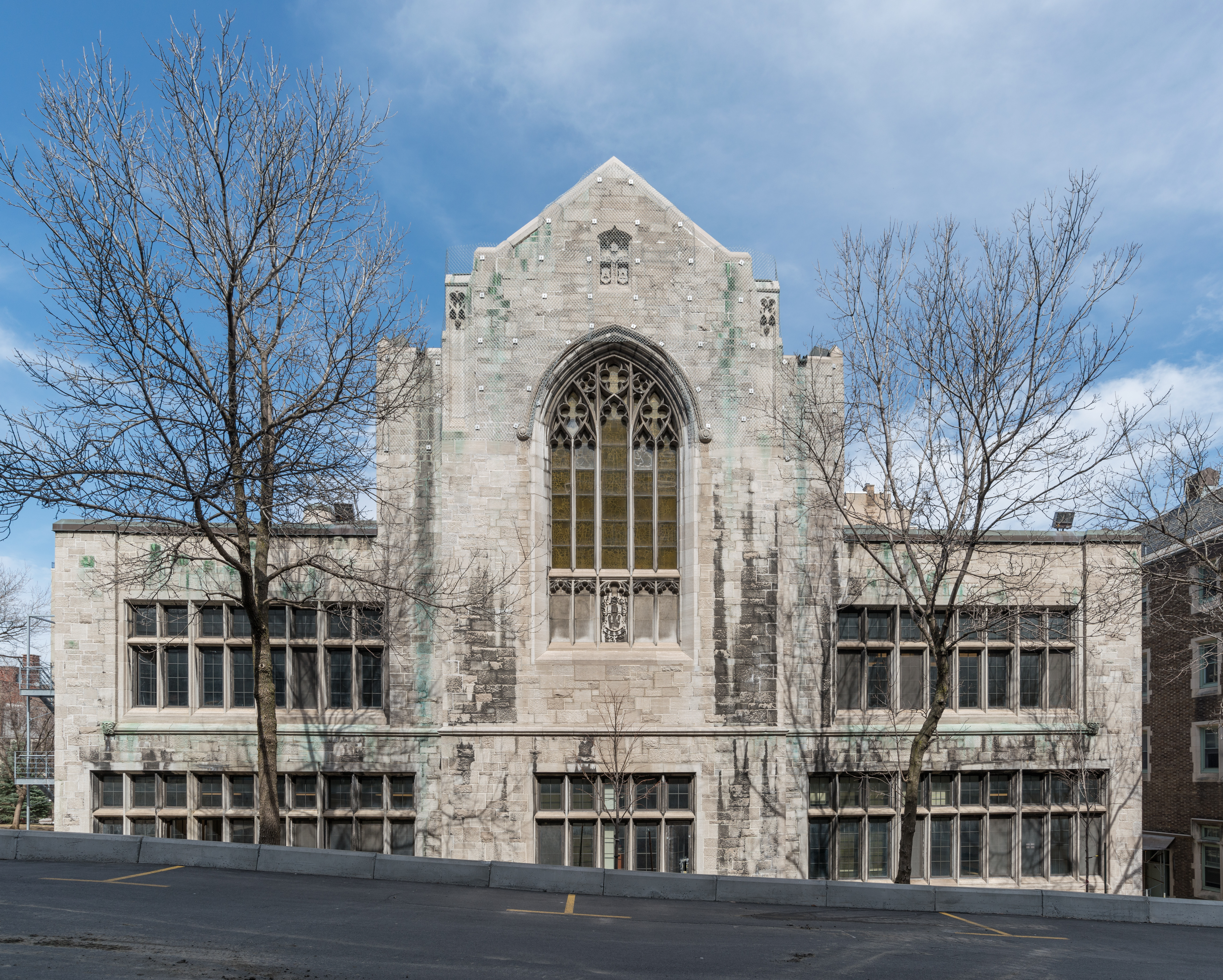
Birks Building, completed in 1931

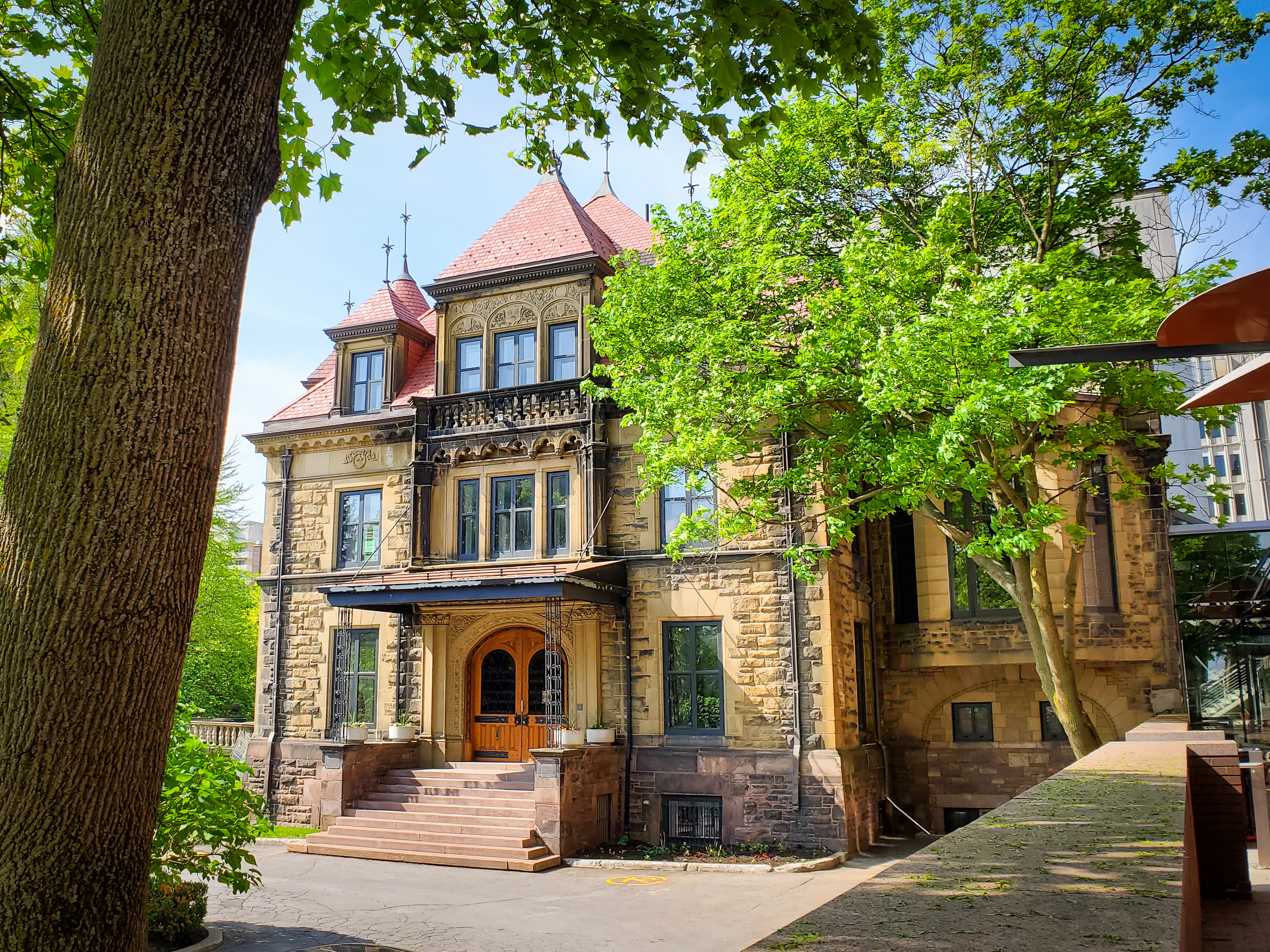
Chancellor Day Hall, built in 1892

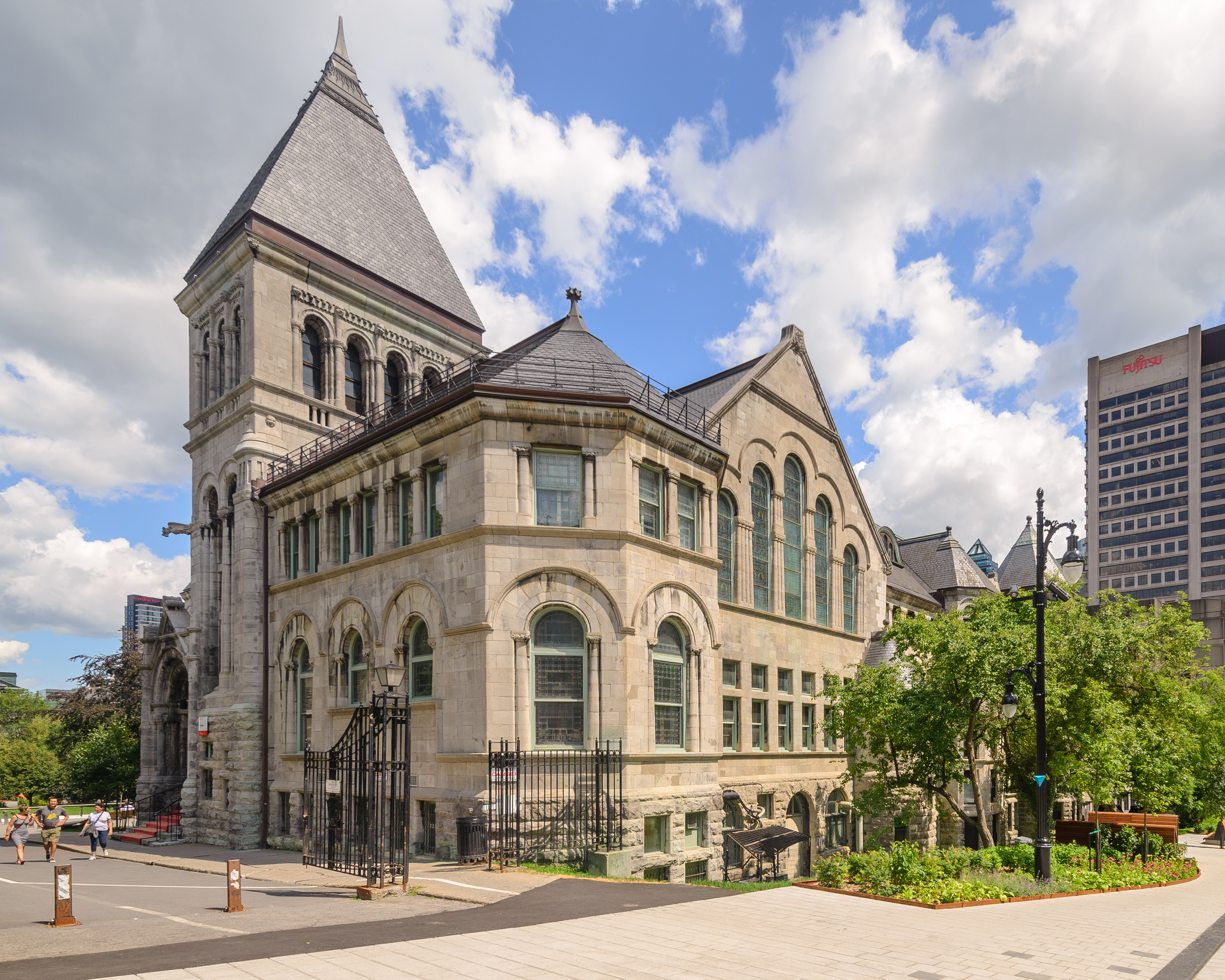
Redpath Hall, opened in 1893

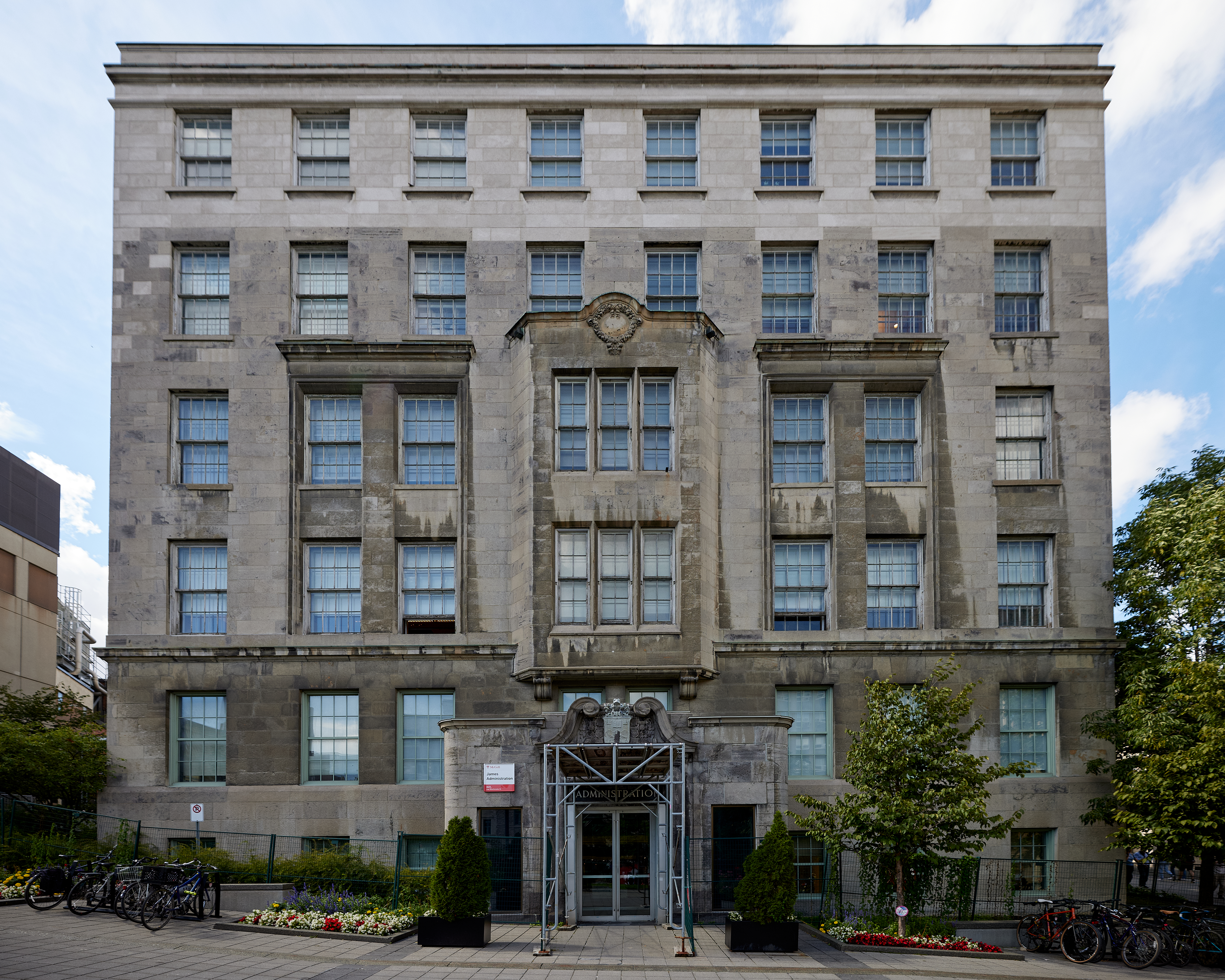
James Administration Building, built in 1922

==== Residence system ====
McGill's residence system comprises 16 properties providing dormitories, apartments, and hotel-style housing to approximately 3,100 undergraduate students and some graduate students from the downtown and Macdonald campuses. Few McGill students live in residence after their first year of undergraduate study, even if they are not from the Montreal area. Most second-year students transition to off-campus apartment housing. Many students settle in the Milton-Park neighbourhood, sometimes called the "McGill Ghetto," which is the neighbourhood directly to the east of the downtown campus. Students have also moved to areas such as Mile End, The Plateau, and even as far as Verdun because of rising rent prices.

Many first-year students live in the Upper Residence. Royal Victoria College opened as a residential college for women in 1899, but its Tower section became mixed gender in September 2010 while its West Wing remains strictly for women. The college's original building was designed by Bruce Price and its extension was designed by Percy Erskine Nobbs and George Taylor Hyde. A statue of Queen Victoria by her daughter Princess Louise, Duchess of Argyll, stands in front of the building.

=== Macdonald campus ===
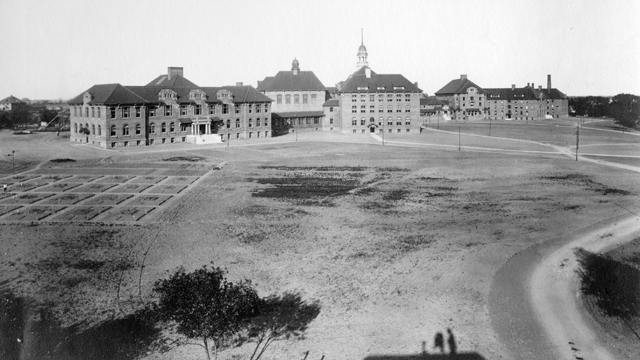
Macdonald Campus under construction in 1906

A second campus, the Macdonald Campus, in Sainte-Anne-de-Bellevue houses the Faculty of Agricultural and Environmental Science, the School of Dietetics and Human Nutrition, the Institute of Parasitology, and the McGill School of Environment. As of fall 2020, despite a decrease in enrolment from the previous year's 1,962 students, the campus has a total of 1,892 actively enrolled students, including those studying part-time and full-time, across all available programs. Of the total, 1,212 students are pursuing an undergraduate degree, 374 are pursuing a Masters-level degree, and 248 are pursuing a Doctoral-level degree, respectively. There is a high international student presence, since over 1 in 5 students are from outside Canada. The campus is considered by many to be quieter than the Downtown Montreal campus. The Morgan Arboretum and the J. S. Marshall Radar Observatory are nearby.

The Morgan Arboretum was created in 1945. It is a 2.5-square-kilometre (0.965 sq mi) forested reserve. Its mandated goals are to continue research related to maintaining the health of the Arboretum plantations and woodlands, to develop new programs related to selecting species adapted to developing environmental conditions and to enhance biological diversity in both natural stands and plantations.

=== Outaouais campus ===
In 2019, McGill announced the construction of a new campus for its Faculty of Medicine in Gatineau, Quebec, which will allow students from the Outaouais region to complete their undergraduate medical education locally and in French. Medical students began using the new facility in August 2020. The new facility is located above the emergency room at Gatineau Hospital, part of the Centre intégré de santé et de services sociaux (CISSS) de l'Outaouais, in addition to new offices for the associated Family Medicine Unit for residency training. Although the preparatory year for students entering the undergraduate medical education program from CEGEP was initially planned to be offered solely at the McGill downtown campus in Montreal, collaboration with the Université du Québec en Outaouais made it possible to offer the program entirely in Gatineau.

=== McGill University Health Centre redevelopment plan ===
In 2006, the Quebec government initiated a $1.6 billion LEED redevelopment project for the McGill University Health Centre (MUHC). The project will expand facilities to two separate campuses and consolidate the various hospitals of the MUHC on the site of an old CP rail yard adjacent to the Vendôme Metro station. This site, known as Glen Yards, comprises 170,000 square metres (1,800,000 sq ft) and spans portions of Montreal's Notre-Dame-de-Grâce neighbourhood and the city of Westmount.

The Glen Yards project has been controversial due to local opposition to the project, environmental issues, and the project's cost.

=== Sustainability ===
In 2007, McGill premiered its Office of Sustainability and added a second full-time position in this area, the Director of Sustainability in addition to the Sustainability Officer. Recent efforts in implementing its sustainable development plan include the new Life Sciences Centre which was built with LEED-Silver certification and a green roof, as well as an increase in parking rates in January 2008 to fund other sustainability projects. Other student projects include The Flat: Bike Collective, which promotes alternative transportation, and the Farmer's Market, which occurs during the fall harvest.

=== McGill Community for Lifelong Learning ===
Founded in 1989, the McGill Community for Lifelong Learning (MCLL) is an educational community for senior learners housed in the McGill School of Continuing Studies. The program was founded by Fiona Clark, then-assistant director of continuing studies at McGill, and drew inspiration from horizontal peer-led programs, including the Harvard Institute for Learning in Retirement. Its educational model is notably different from an instructor-led approach, and tasks seniors exploring educational interest as either study group moderators or participants. The program brings together hundreds of senior members yearly and has acted as a springboard for numerous senior-led initiatives such as social events, educational symposiums, and cultural festivals, including an internationally recognized yearly Bloomsday event on the life and work of author James Joyce.

=== Other facilities ===
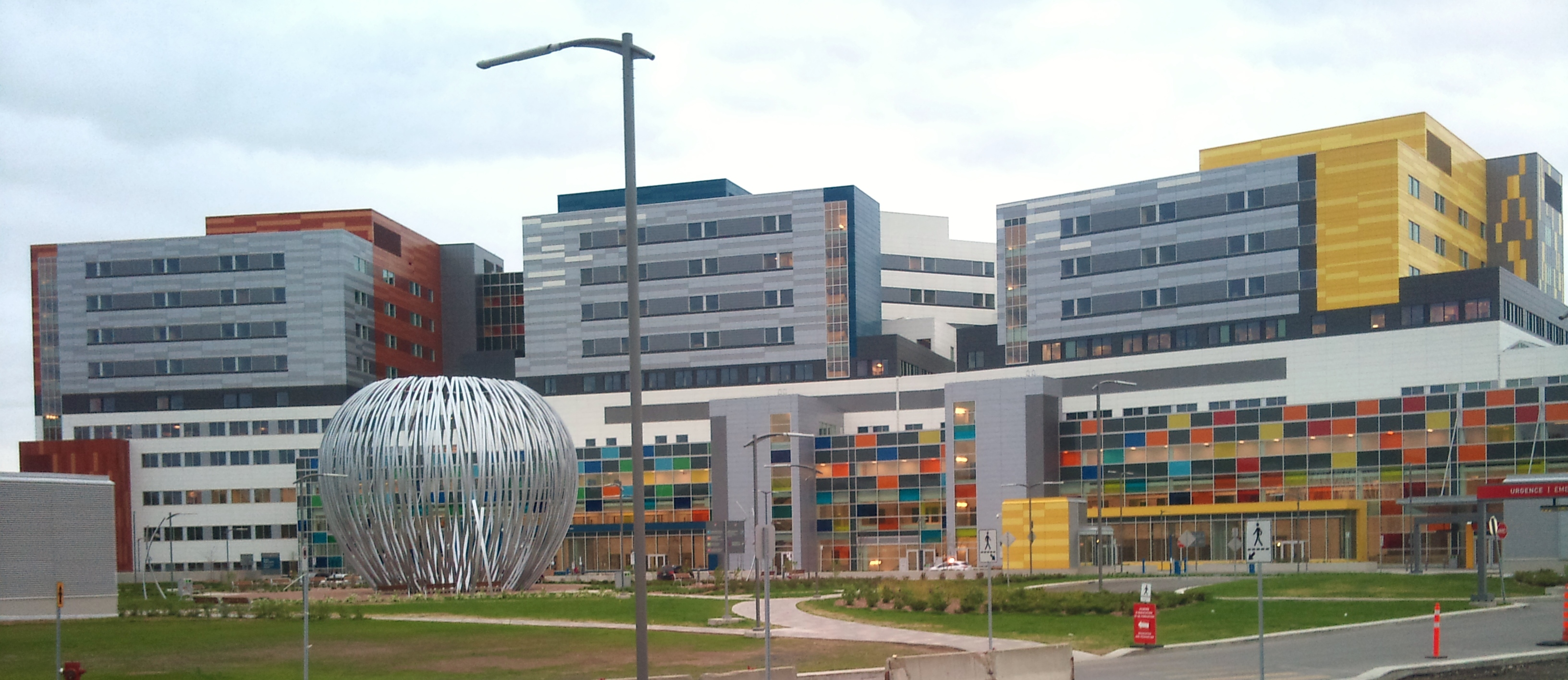
The newly built McGill University Health Centre at the Glen Site

McGill's Bellairs Research Institute, in Saint James, Barbados 13°10′N 59°35′W, is Canada's only teaching and research facility in the tropics. The institute has been in use for over 50 years. The university also operates the McGill Arctic Research Station on Axel Heiberg Island, Nunavut, and a Subarctic Research Station in Schefferville, Quebec.

McGill's Gault Nature Reserve (45°32′N 73°10′W) spans over 10 square kilometres (3.9 sq mi) of forest land, the largest remaining remnant of the primeval forests of the St. Lawrence River Valley. The first scientific studies at the site occurred in 1859. The site has been the site of extensive research activities: "Today there are over 400 scientific articles, 100 graduate theses, more than 50 government reports and about 30 book chapters based on research at Mont St. Hilaire."

In addition to the McGill University Health Centre, McGill has been directly partnered with many teaching hospitals for decades and has a history of collaborating with many hospitals in Montreal. These cooperations allow the university to graduate over 1,000 students in health care each year. McGill's contract-affiliated teaching hospitals include the Montreal Children's Hospital, the Montreal General Hospital, the Montreal Neurological Hospital, the Montreal Chest Institute and the Royal Victoria Hospital which are all now part of the McGill University Health Centre. Other hospitals health care students may use include the Jewish General Hospital, the Douglas Hospital, St. Mary's Hospital Centre, Lachine Hospital, LaSalle Hospital, Lakeshore General Hospital, as well as health care facilities part of the CISSS.

== Administration and organization ==
=== Structure ===
The university's academic units are organized into 11 main Faculties and 13 Schools. These include the School of Architecture, the School of Computer Science, the School of Information Studies, the School of Human Nutrition, the Bensadoun School of Retail Management, the Max Bell School of Public Policy, the School of Physical & Occupational Therapy, the Ingram School of Nursing, the School of Social Work, the School of Urban Planning, and the Bieler School of Environment. They also include the Institute of Islamic Studies (established in 1952), which offers graduate courses leading to the M.A. and PhD degrees.

The Graduate and Postdoctoral Studies (GPS) oversees the admission and registration of graduate students (both master's and PhD).

Faculties/Schools
Faculty of Agricultural and Environmental Sciences
Faculty of Arts
School of Continuing Studies
Faculty of Dentistry
Faculty of Education
Faculty of Engineering
Faculty of Law
Desautels Faculty of Management
Faculty of Medicine
Schulich School of Music
School of Religious Studies
Faculty of Science

=== University identity and culture ===
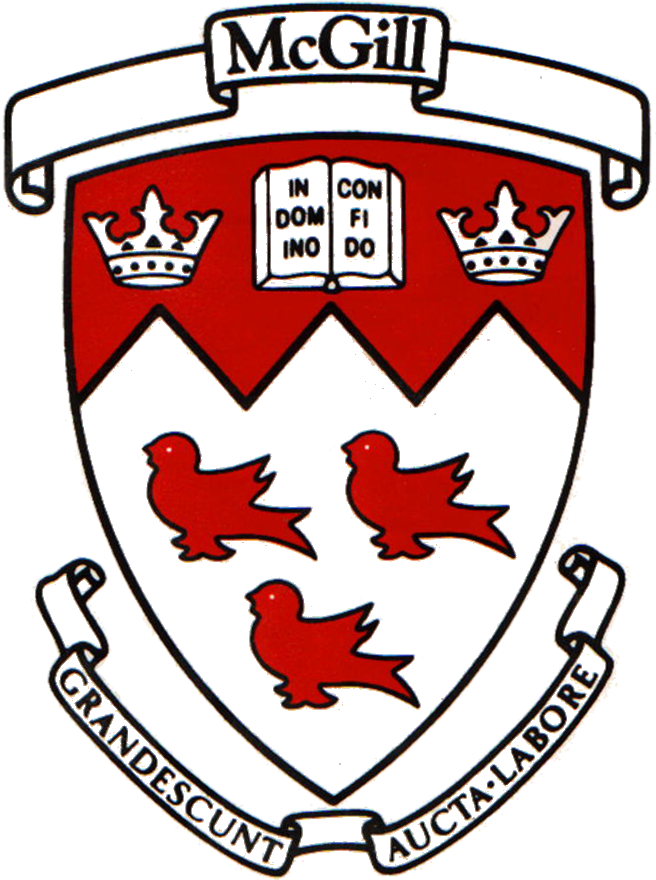
McGill coat of arms

The McGill coat of arms is derived from an armorial device assumed during his lifetime by the founder of the university, James McGill. It was designed in 1906 by Percy Nobbs, three years into his term as director of the university's School of Architecture. The university's patent of arms was subsequently granted by the Garter King at Arms in 1922, registered in 1956 with Lord Lyon King of Arms in Edinburgh, and in 1992 with the Public Register of Arms, Flags and Badges of Canada. In heraldic terms, the coat of arms is described as follows: "Argent three Martlets Gules, on a chief dancette of the second, an open book proper garnished or bearing the legend In Domino Confido in letters Sable between two crowns of the first. Motto: Grandescunt Aucta Labore." The coat of arms consists of two parts, the shield and the scroll. The university publishes a guide to the use of the university's arms and motto.

The university's symbol is the martlet, stemming from the presence of the mythical bird on the official arms of the university. The university's official colour is scarlet, which figures prominently in the academic dress of McGill University. McGill's motto is Grandescunt Aucta Labore, Latin for "By work, all things increase and grow" (literally, "Things grown great increase by work," that is, things that grow to be great do so by means of work). The official school song is entitled "Hail, Alma Mater."

=== Exchange and study abroad ===
McGill maintains ties with more than 160 partner universities where students can study abroad for either one or two semesters. Each year, McGill hosts around 500 incoming exchange students from over 32 countries. The university offers a multitude of activities and events to integrate students into the university's community. McGill is the home to more than 10,000 foreign students who make up of more than 27 per cent of the student population.

=== Finances ===
The McGill endowment provides approximately 10 per cent of the school's annual operating revenues. McGill's endowment rests within the top 10 per cent of all North American post-secondary institutions' endowments. As of 2022, the endowment is valued at $2.039 billion, the third-largest endowment among Canadian universities, and remains one of the largest endowments on a per-student basis.

McGill launched the Campaign McGill campaign in October 2007, with the goal of raising over $750 million for the purpose of further "attracting and retaining top talent in Quebec, to increase access to quality education and to further enhance McGill's ability to address critical global problems." The largest goal of any Canadian University fundraising campaign at the time, the campaign was officially closed on June 18, 2013, having raised more than $1 billion. Campaign McGill has since been surpassed by larger fundraising campaigns, such as the University of British Columbia's $3 billion FORWARD campaign and the University of Toronto's $4 billion Defy Gravity campaign. In 2019, McGill launched Made By McGill, a new $2 billion fundraising campaign.

In 2019, McGill received a $200 million donation to fund the creation of the McCall MacBain Scholarships programme, the then-largest single philanthropic gift to a Canadian University, until it was surpassed in 2020 by a $250 million donation by James and Louise Temerty to the University of Toronto.

== Academics ==
=== Admissions ===
McGill University has an acceptance rate of 38.1 per cent and a graduate acceptance rate of 29.2 per cent, with an enrolment rate of 19 per cent of all applicants. 22 per cent of all students are enrolled in the Faculty of Arts, McGill's largest academic unit. Of the other larger faculties, the Faculty of Science enrols 15 per cent, the Faculty of Medicine enrols 13 per cent, the School of Continuing Studies enrols 12 per cent, the Faculty of Engineering and the Desautels Faculty of Management enrol about 10 per cent each. The remainder of all students are enrolled in McGill's smaller schools, including the Faculty of Agricultural and Environmental Sciences, Faculty of Dentistry, Faculty of Medicine, Faculty of Education, Faculty of Law, Schulich School of Music, and the Faculty of Religious Studies. Since the 1880s, McGill has been affiliated with three Theological Colleges; the Montreal Diocesan Theological College (Anglican Church of Canada), The Presbyterian College, Montreal (Presbyterian Church in Canada), and United Theological College (United Church of Canada). The university's Faculty of Religious Studies maintains additional affiliations with other theological institutions and organizations, such as the Montreal School of Theology.

==== Undergraduate ====
Among Canadian universities, McGill undergraduates have the second highest average entering grades among high school and CEGEP students entering from their home province. Among admitted students, the median Quebec CEGEP R-score was 31.9, while the median grade 12 averages for students entering McGill from outside of Quebec ranged between 93.2 per cent and 94.4 per cent (A). For American students, the median SAT scores in the verbal, mathematics, and writing sections were 730, 730, and 730, respectively. The median ACT score was 32.

==== Law ====
Due to its bilingual nature, McGill's law school does not require applicants to sit the LSAT, which is only offered in English. For students who submitted LSAT scores in the September 2019 entering class, the median LSAT score was 163 (87.8th percentile) out of a possible 180 points. Of those students who entered with a bachelor's degree, the median GPA was 86 per cent (3.8/4.0), and of those students entering from CEGEP, the average R-score was 34.29.

==== Medicine ====
For medical students in the 2024 entering class, of those students who entered with a bachelor's degree, the average GPA was 3.89 out of 4.0, and of those students entering from CEGEP, the average R-score was 35.69. McGill does not require applicants to its medical programme to sit the MCAT if they have an undergraduate degree from a Canadian University.

==== MBA ====
In the Desautels Faculty of Management's MBA program, applicants had an average GMAT score of 670 and an average GPA of 3.3. MBA students had an average age of 28, and five years of work experience. 95 per cent of MBA students are bilingual and 60 per cent are trilingual.

=== Teaching and learning ===
In the 2007–2008 school year, McGill offered over 340 academic programs in eleven faculties. The university also offers over 250 doctoral and master's graduate degree programs. Despite strong increases in University enrolment across North America, McGill has upheld a student-faculty ratio of 16:1. There are nearly 1,600 tenured or tenure-track professors teaching at the university.

Tuition fees vary significantly depending on the faculties that aspiring (graduate and undergraduate) students choose as well as their citizenship. For the undergraduate faculty of the arts, tuition fees vary for in-province, out-of-province, and international students, with full-time Quebec students paying around $4,333.10 per year, Canadian students from other provinces paying around $9,509.30 per year, and international students paying $22,102.57–$41,815.92 per year.

Since 1996, McGill, in accordance with the Quebec Ministry of Education, Recreation and Sports (Ministère de l'Éducation, du Loisir et du Sport or MELS), has had eight categories that qualifies certain international students to be excused from paying international fees. These categories include: students from France and French-speaking Belgium, a quota of students from select countries which have agreements with MELS, which include Algeria, China, and Morocco, students holding diplomatic status, including their dependents, and students enrolled in certain language programs leading to a degree in French. In the 2008–2009 school year, McGill's graduate business program became funded by tuition. It was the last business school in Canada to do so.

For out-of-province first year undergraduate students, a high school average of 95 per cent is required to receive a guaranteed one-year entrance scholarship. For renewal of previously earned scholarships, students generally need to be within the top 10 per cent of their faculty. For in-course scholarships in particular, students must be within the top 5 per cent of their faculty.

The university has joined Project Hero, a scholarship program cofounded by General (Ret'd) Rick Hillier for the families of fallen Canadian Forces members. McGill is also partnered with the STEM initiative Schulich Leader Scholarships, awarding an $80,000 scholarship to an incoming engineering student and a $60,000 scholarship to a student pursuing a degree in science/technology/mathematics each year.

=== Language policy ===
McGill is one of three English-language universities in Quebec; French is not a requirement to attend. The Faculty of Law does, however, require all students to be 'passively bilingual' since English or French may be used at any time. The majority of students are fluent in at least two languages. In 2021, about 72 per cent of McGill students responding to a census conducted by the university said their level of proficiency in French was at least "intermediate". In 2024, the Quebec government introduced a requirement for 80 per cent of enrolled students to reach proficiency in French by graduation.

Francophone students, whether from Quebec or overseas, now make up approximately 20 per cent of the student body. Although the language of instruction is English, since its founding McGill has allowed students to write their thesis in French, and since 1964 students in all faculties have been able to submit any graded work in either English or French, provided the objective of the class is not to learn a particular language.

In 1969, the nationalist McGill français movement demanded McGill become francophone, pro-nationalist, and pro-worker. The movement was led by Stanley Gray, a political science professor (and possibly unaware of government plans after the 1968 legislation founding the Université du Québec). A demonstration was held of 10,000 trade unionists, leftist activists, CEGEP students, and even some McGill students, at the university's Roddick Gates on March 28, 1969. Protesters saw English as the privileged language of commerce. McGill, where Francophones were only three per cent of the students, could be seen as the force maintaining economic control by Anglophones of a predominantly French-speaking province. However, the majority of students and faculty opposed such a position.

=== Rankings and reputation ===
University rankings

World rankings
- ARWU World: 74
- QS World: 27
- THE World: 41
- THE Employability: 29
- USNWR World: 56 (tie)
- 3

Canadian rankings
- QS National: 1
- THE National: 2
- USNWR National: 3
- Maclean's Medical/Doctoral: 1

McGill ranks first in Canada among medical-doctoral universities in Maclean's Canadian University Rankings 2026. The university has held the top position in the ranking for 21 consecutive years. The Globe and Mail's Canadian University Report 2019 categorized McGill as "above average" for its financial aid, student experience and research, and as "average" for its library resources. Research Infosource ranked McGill second among Canadian universities with medical schools in its 2020 edition of Research Universities of the Year.

Internationally, McGill ranked 27th in the world and first in Canada in the 2026 QS World University Rankings. It also ranked 27th in the world and second in Canada in the 2025 CWUR World University Rankings. It was ranked 41st in the world and second in Canada by the 2026 Times Higher Education World University Rankings. In 2024, the Academic Ranking of World Universities ranked the university 74th in the world, and third in Canada. In the 2024–2025 U.S. News & World Report Best Global University Rankings, McGill was ranked 56th in the world and third in Canada.

In the Global University Employability Ranking 2022, published by Times Higher Education, McGill ranked 29th in the world and second in Canada. Nature ranked McGill 67th in the world and second in Canada among academic institutions for high-impact research in the 2021 edition of Nature Index.

McGill's MBA program, offered by the Desautels Faculty of Management, has appeared in several rankings. Quacquarelli Symonds, in its Global MBA Rankings 2021, ranked McGill's MBA 59th in the world and second in Canada. The Financial Times, in its 2020 Global MBA ranking, placed the MBA programme 91st in the world and second in Canada. In Bloomberg BusinessWeek's Best Business Schools ranking 2019–2020, Desautels was ranked seventh in Canada.

McGill is a member of the Global University Leaders Forum (GULF), composed of the presidents of 29 of the world's top universities. It is the only Canadian University member of GULF. McGill is also one of only two non-American universities to be a member of the Association of American Universities, an organization of research-intensive universities.

=== Research ===
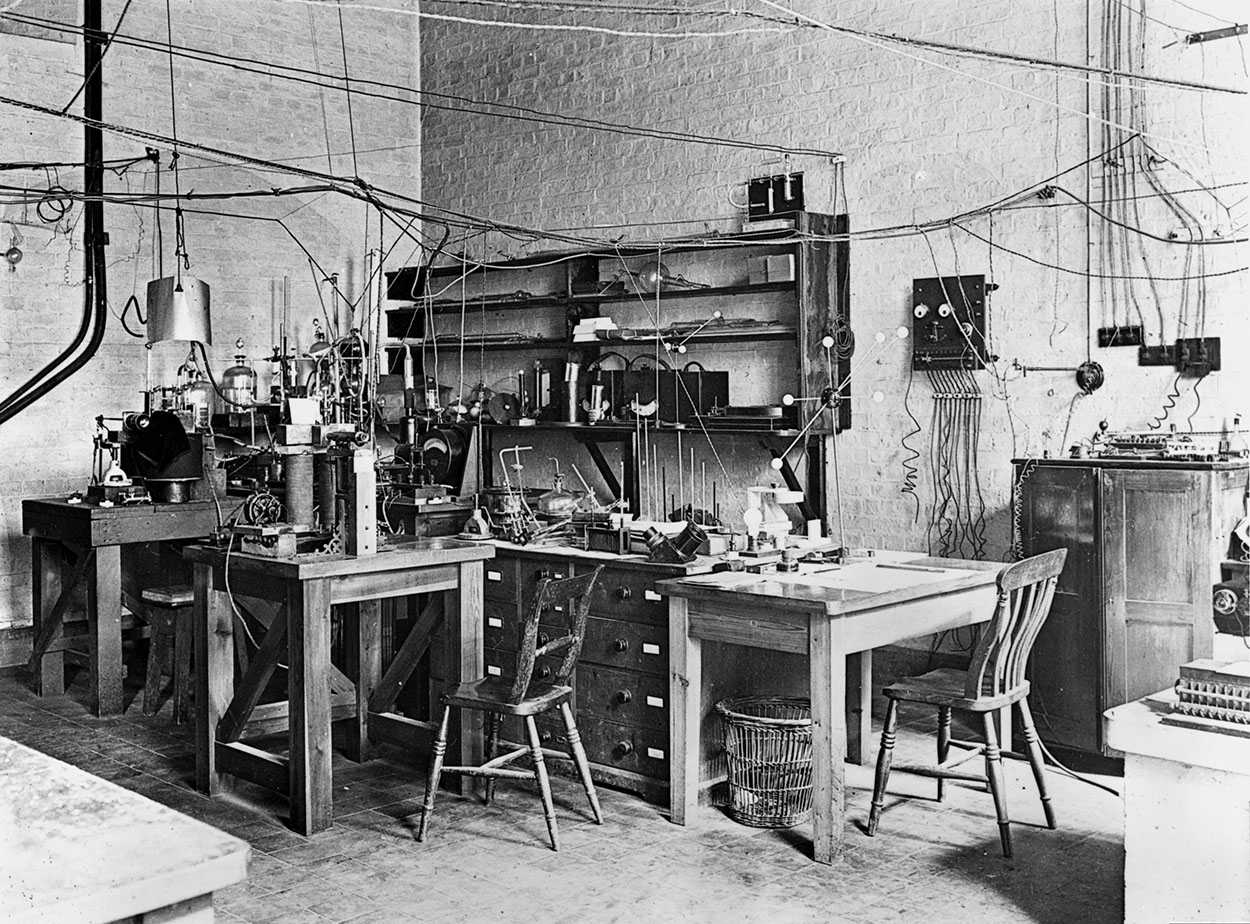
The laboratory of Rutherford, early 20th century

McGill is affiliated with 15 Nobel Laureates, and professors have won major teaching prizes. According to the Association of Universities and Colleges of Canada, "researchers at McGill are affiliated with about 75 major research centres and networks, and are engaged in an extensive array of research partnerships with other universities, government and industry in Quebec and Canada, throughout North America and in dozens of other countries." In 2016, McGill had over $547 million of sponsored research income, the second-highest in Canada, and a research intensity per faculty of $317,600, the third highest among full-service universities in Canada. McGill has one of the largest patent portfolios among Canadian universities. McGill's researchers are supported by the McGill University Library, which comprises 13 branch libraries and holds over 11.5 million items.

Since 1926, McGill has been a member of the Association of American Universities (AAU), an organization of leading research universities in North America. McGill is a founding member of Universitas 21, an international network of leading research-intensive universities that work together to expand their global reach and advance their plans for internationalization. McGill is one of 26 members of the Global University Leaders Forum (GULF), which acts as an intellectual community within the World Economic Forum to advise its leadership on matters relating to higher education and research. It is the only Canadian University member of GULF. McGill is also a member of the U15, a group of prominent research universities within Canada.

McGill-Queen's University Press began as McGill in 1963 and amalgamated with Queen's in 1969. McGill-Queen's University Press focuses on Canadian studies and publishes the Canadian Public Administration Series.

Radon, discovered at McGill by physicist Ernest Rutherford

Sir William Osler, Wilder Penfield, Donald Hebb, Donald Ewen Cameron, Brenda Milner, and others made significant discoveries in medicine, neuroscience and psychology while working at McGill, many at the university's Montreal Neurological Institute. The first hormone governing the Immune System (later christened the Cytokine 'Interleukin-2') was discovered at McGill in 1965 by Gordon & McLean.

The invention of the world's first artificial cell was made by Thomas Chang while an undergraduate student at the university. While chair of physics at McGill, nuclear physicist Ernest Rutherford performed the experiment that led to the discovery of the alpha particle and its function in radioactive decay, which won him the Nobel Prize in Chemistry in 1908. Alumnus Jack W. Szostak was awarded the 2009 Nobel Prize in medicine for discovering a key mechanism in the genetic operations of cells, an insight that has inspired new lines of research into cancer.

=== Libraries, archives and museums ===
The McGill University Library comprises 12 branch libraries containing 11.5 million items in its collection. Its branches include the Department of Rare Books & Special Collections, which holds about 350,000 items, including books, manuscripts, maps, prints, and a general rare book collection. The Islamic Studies Library contains over 125,000 volumes and a growing number of electronic resources covering the whole of Islamic civilization, including approximately 3,000 rare books and manuscripts. The Osler Library of the History of Medicine is the largest medical history library in Canada and one of the most comprehensive in the world.

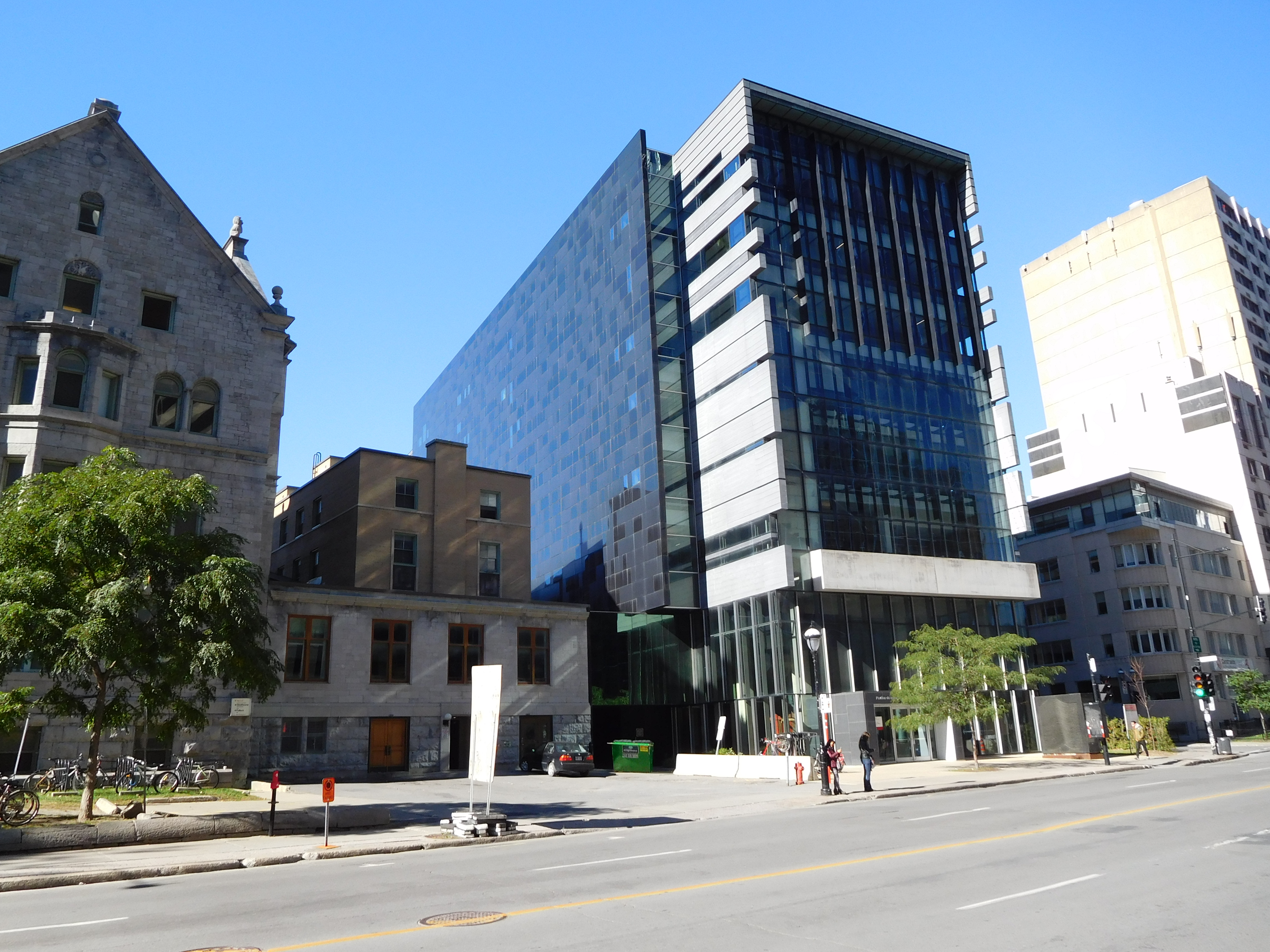
Elizabeth Wirth Music Building, also a library, sits adjacent to the old Strathcona Music Building.

The McGill University Archives – now administered as part of the McGill Library – consist of manuscripts, texts, photographs, audio-visual material, architectural records, cartographic materials, prints, drawings, microforms and artifacts. In 1962 F. Cyril James declared that the newly founded McGill University Archives (MUA), while concentrating on the institutional records of McGill, had the mandate to acquire private papers of former faculty members. In the 1990s drew back their acquisition scope, and in 2004, new terms of reference on private acquisitions were introduced that included a wider McGill Community.

The Redpath Museum houses collections of interest to ethnology, biology, paleontology, mineralogy and geology. Built in 1882, the Redpath is the oldest building in Canada built specifically to be a museum.

The McGill Medical Museum catalogues, preserves, conserves and displays collections that document the study and practice of medicine at McGill University and its associated teaching hospitals. The Medical museum features collections, individual specimens, artifacts, equipment logbooks, autopsy journals, paper materials and medical instruments and apparatus, 25 wax models, 200 mostly skeletal dry specimens, and 400 lantern slides of anatomic specimens. There is a special emphasis on pathology; there are 2000 fluid-filled preserved anatomical and pathological specimens. The Osler collection, for example, consists of 60 wet specimens, while The Abbott collection consists of 80 wet specimens, mostly examples of congenital cardiac disease.

== Student life ==
=== Student body ===
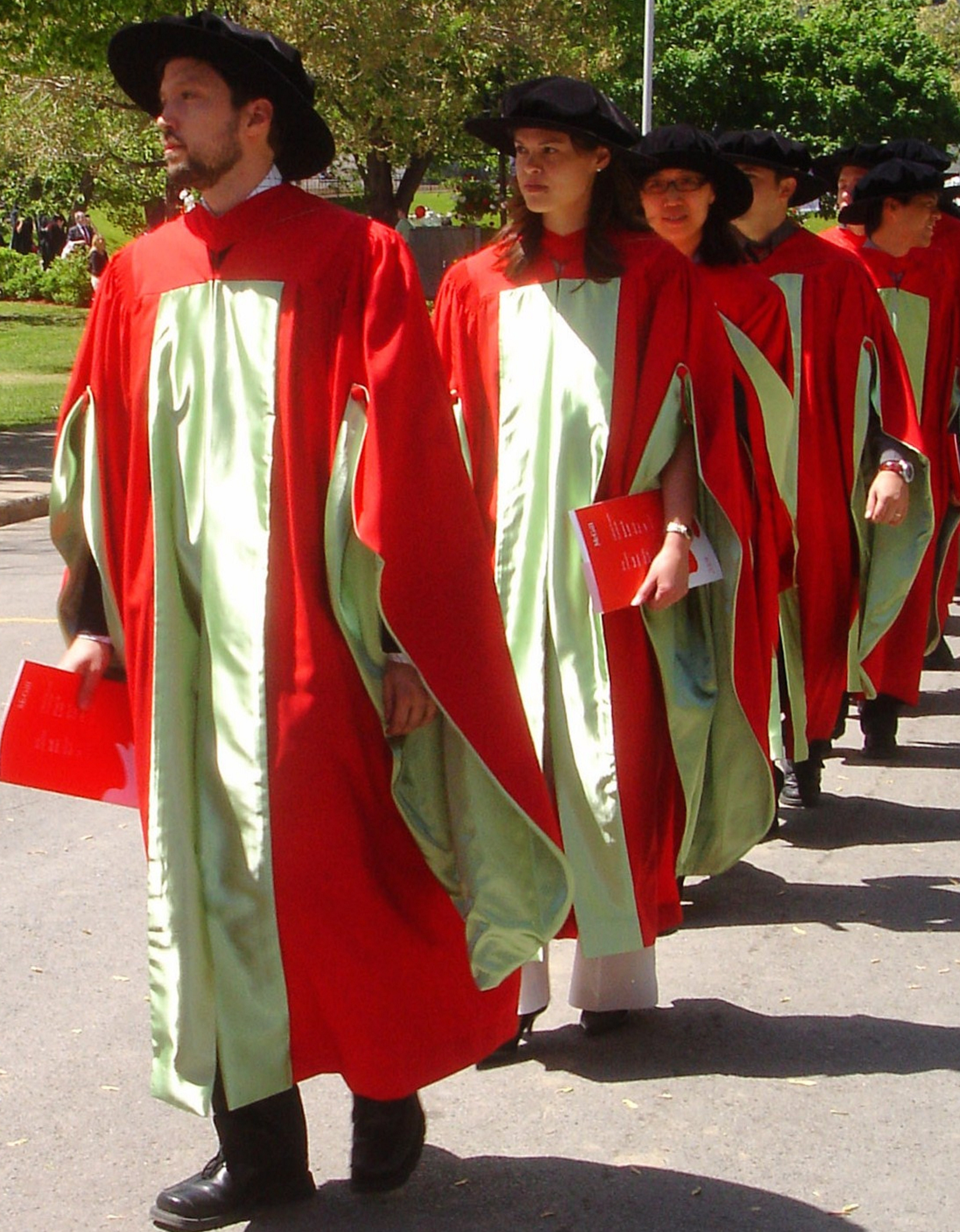
PhD candidates march at Commencement in McGill's scarlet regalia.

As of Fall 2021, McGill's student population includes 26,765 undergraduate and 10,411 graduate students representing diverse geographic and linguistic backgrounds. Of the entire student population, 46.8 per cent are from Quebec and 22.8 per cent are from the rest of Canada, while 30.4 per cent are from outside of Canada. International students hail from about 150 countries, with many students coming from the United States, China, and France. Over half of McGill students claim a first language other than English, with 19.7 per cent of the students claiming French as their mother tongue and 33.5 per cent claiming a language other than English and French, compared to 46.8 per cent who claim English as their mother tongue. In Fall 2021, 34,379 students were enrolled in full-time studies, while 4,888 students enrolled in part-time studies.

=== Student organizations ===
The campus has an active students' society represented by the undergraduate Students' Society of McGill University (SSMU) and the Post-Graduate Students' Society of McGill University (PGSS). Due to the large postdoctoral student population, the PGSS also contains a semi-autonomous Association of Postdoctoral Fellows (APF). In addition, each faculty and department has its own student governing body, the largest faculty associations being the Arts Undergraduate Society (AUS) and the Science Undergraduate Society (SUS). The oldest is the Medical Students Society, founded in 1859.

SSMU supports more than 250 student-run membership clubs, which range from athletics, health and wellness, arts, and culture groups to professional development, charitable, volunteer, and political associations. It offers 17 student-run services, which provide services and resources to students regardless of membership, such as the Flat Bike Collective, Black Students' Network, McGill Students' Nightline, and Queer McGill (formerly Gay McGill), which has supported queer students since 1972. SSMU is also affiliated with 11 independent student groups, which operate on campus but are outside of the student society's governance structure. These independent groups include student media outlets, a legal clinic, AIESEC McGill, and the International Relations Students' Association of McGill (IRSAM), which publishes the world's only all-inclusive international relations research journal, the McGill International Review, and has consultative status with the UN Economic and Social Council and the United Nations Educational, Scientific and Cultural Organization. IRSAM has hosted the McGill Model United Nations for University students since 1990 and the Secondary Schools United Nations Symposium since 1993.

Many student clubs are centred around McGill's student union building, the University Centre. In 1992, students held a referendum calling for the University Centre to be renamed for actor and McGill alumnus William Shatner. The university administration refused to accept the name and did not attend the opening because it traditionally names buildings in honour of deceased community members or major benefactors—Shatner is neither. Nevertheless, the University Centre has been informally referred to as the Shatner Building ever since.

==== Student media ====
McGill has a number of student-run publications. The McGill Daily, first published in 1911, was previously published twice weekly, but shifted to a once-a-week publication schedule in September 2013 due to tightened budgets. The Délit français is the Daily's French-language counterpart. The combined circulation of both papers is over 28,000. The Tribune currently publishes once a week, circulating approximately 11,000 copies across campus. The Bull & Bear, operating under the Management Undergraduate Society, publishes 1,000 copies each month. CKUT (90.3 FM) is the campus radio station. TVMcGill is the university TV station, broadcasting on closed-circuit television and over the internet.

The McGill University Faculty of Law is home to three student-run academic journals, including the McGill Law Journal, founded in 1952.

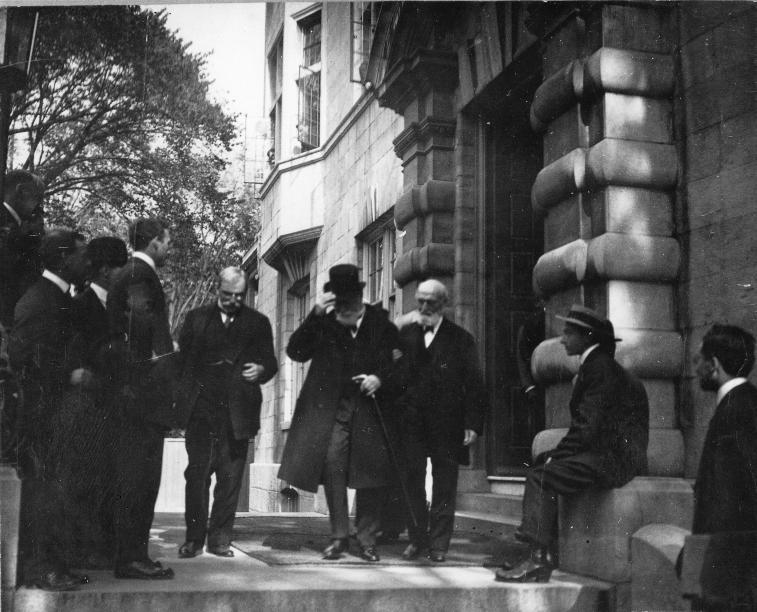
Opening of the Student Union building, 1906

==== Greek life ====
The Greek system at McGill consists of several fraternities and sororities. Canada's only national fraternity, Phi Kappa Pi, was founded at McGill and the University of Toronto in 1913 and continues to be active. McGill was also chosen as the first University to expand to outside of the United States for several Greek letter organizations, for instance, with the Québec Alpha chapter of Phi Delta Theta in 1902. The Greek letter organizations at McGill are governed by the Inter-Greek Letter Council, the school's second-largest student group. Over 500 students or approximately 2 per cent of the student population are in sororities and fraternities at McGill, on a par with most Canadian schools but below the average for American universities.

=== Athletics ===
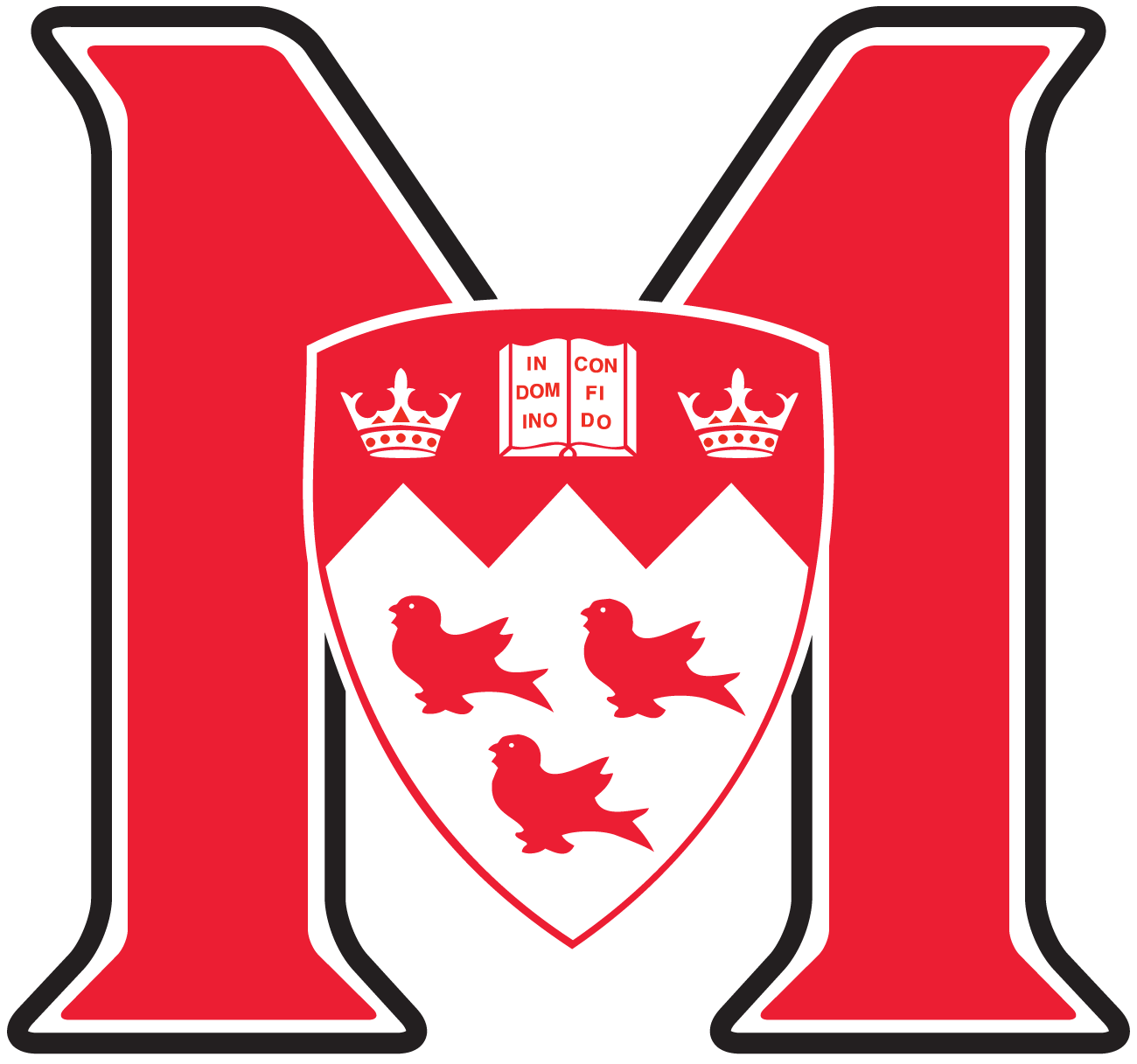
McGill Athletics logo

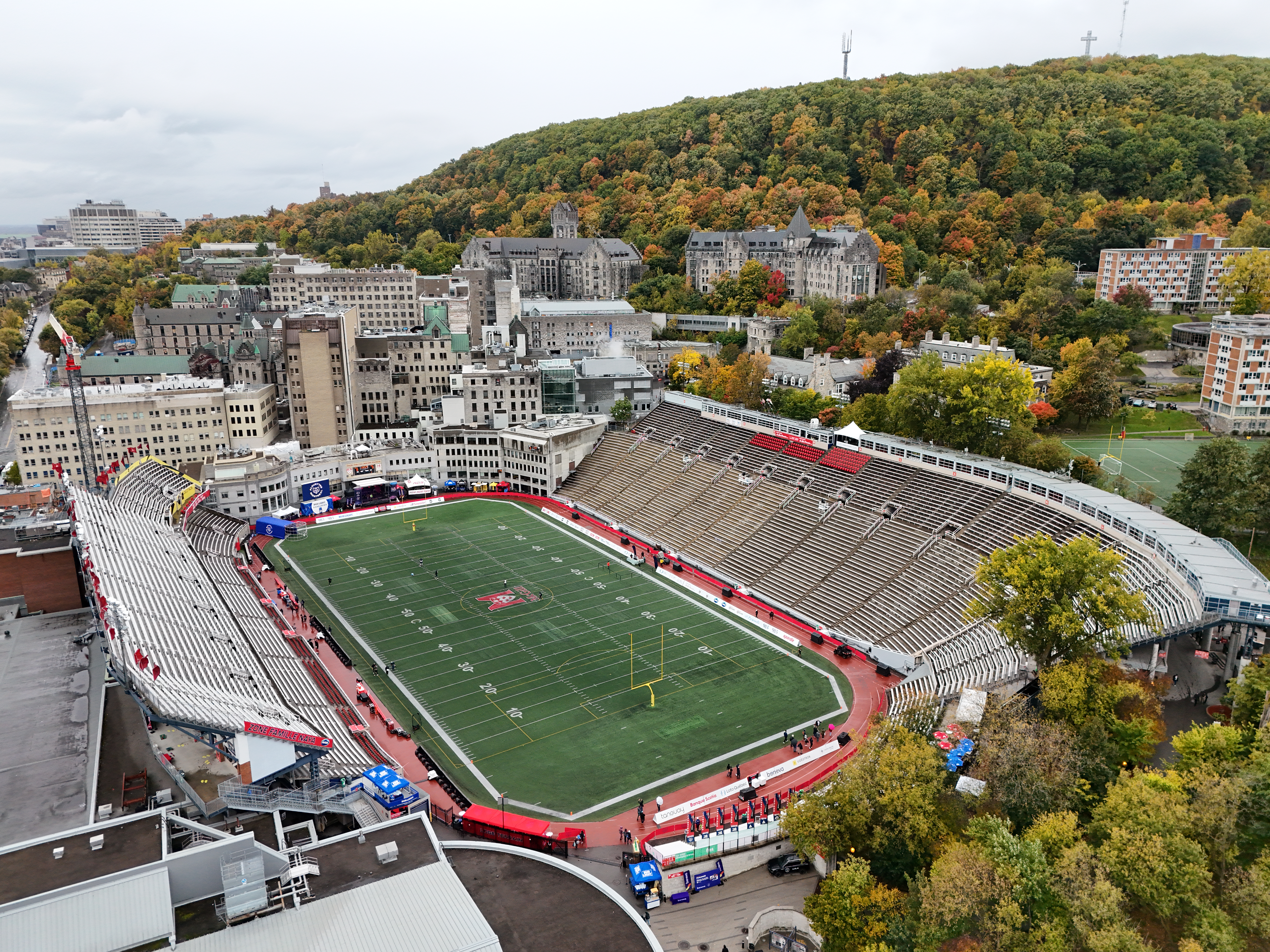
Percival Molson Memorial Stadium

McGill is represented in U Sports by the McGill Redbirds and Martlets with the Redbirds representing men's teams and the Martlets representing women's teams. McGill is currently home to 28 varsity teams.

McGill is known for its strong baseball, hockey and lacrosse programs. McGill's unique mascot, Marty the Martlet, was introduced during the 2005 Homecoming game.

The downtown McGill campus sport and exercise facilities include: the McGill Sports Centre (which includes the Tomlinson Fieldhouse and the Windsor Varsity Clinic), Molson Stadium, Memorial Pool, Tomlinson Hall, McConnell Arena, Forbes Field, many outdoor tennis courts and other extra-curricular arenas and faculties.

The Macdonald Campus facilities include an arena, a gymnasium, a pool, tennis courts, fitness centres and hundreds of acres of green space for regular use. The university's largest sporting venue, Molson Stadium, was constructed in 1914. Following an expansion project completed in 2010, it now seats just over 25,000, and is the current home field of the Montreal Alouettes.

== Notable people ==
McGill alumni have played pivotal roles in the founding of several institutions of higher education. These include the first President of the University of British Columbia (UBC) Frank Wesbrook, the former President of UBC and President of the University of Michigan Santa J. Ono, the co-founder of the Johns Hopkins University School of Medicine William Osler, and the first President of the University of Alberta Henry Marshall Tory. More recent academic leaders include President of Princeton University Harold Tafler Shapiro, and former President of Stanford University Marc Trevor Tessier-Lavigne.

In the arts, McGill students include four Pulitzer Prize winners, (Note: These are Leon Edel (1963), Charles Krauthammer (1987), John F. Burns (1993, 1997) and Matthew Rosenberg (2018).) Templeton and Berggruen Prize winner Charles Taylor, essayist and novelist John Ralston Saul, and Emmy Award-winning actor William Shatner.

In the sciences, McGill graduates and faculty have received a total of 15 Nobel Prizes in disciplines ranging from Physiology, Medicine, Economics, Chemistry and Physics. McGill has also produced five astronauts out of 14 total selected in the CSA's history. Other prominent science alumni include the inventor of the artificial cell Thomas Chang, inventor of the internet search engine Alan Emtage, and inventor of the explosives vapour detector (EVD-1) Lorne Elias.

In law and politics, McGill alumni include three Prime Ministers of Canada (John Abbott, Wilfrid Laurier and Justin Trudeau), one Governor General of Canada (Julie Payette). A number of foreign leaders have graduated from McGill including President of Costa Rica Daniel Oduber Quirós, President of Latvia Vaira Vīķe-Freiberga, Prime Minister of Egypt Ahmed Nazif. John Peters Humphrey wrote with Eleanor Roosevelt the Universal Declaration of Human Rights.

In sport, McGill students and alumni include 121 Olympians who have won 35 Olympic medals. Other notable sporting alumni include the inventor of basketball James Naismith and Triple Gold Club member Mike Babcock.

As of 2024, alumni have included 149 Rhodes Scholars.

Notable McGill alumni include:

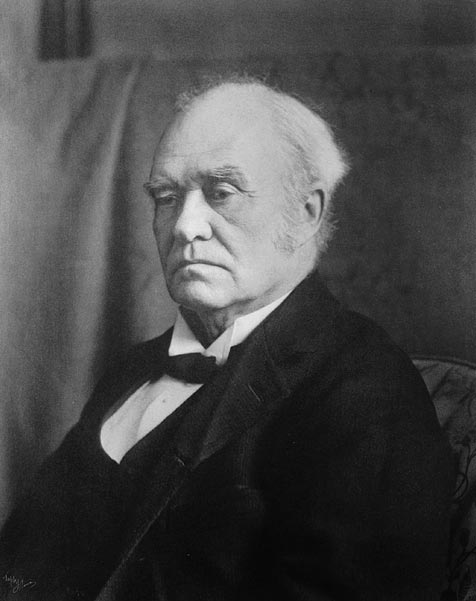
3rd prime minister of Canada Sir John Abbott (BCL, 1847).

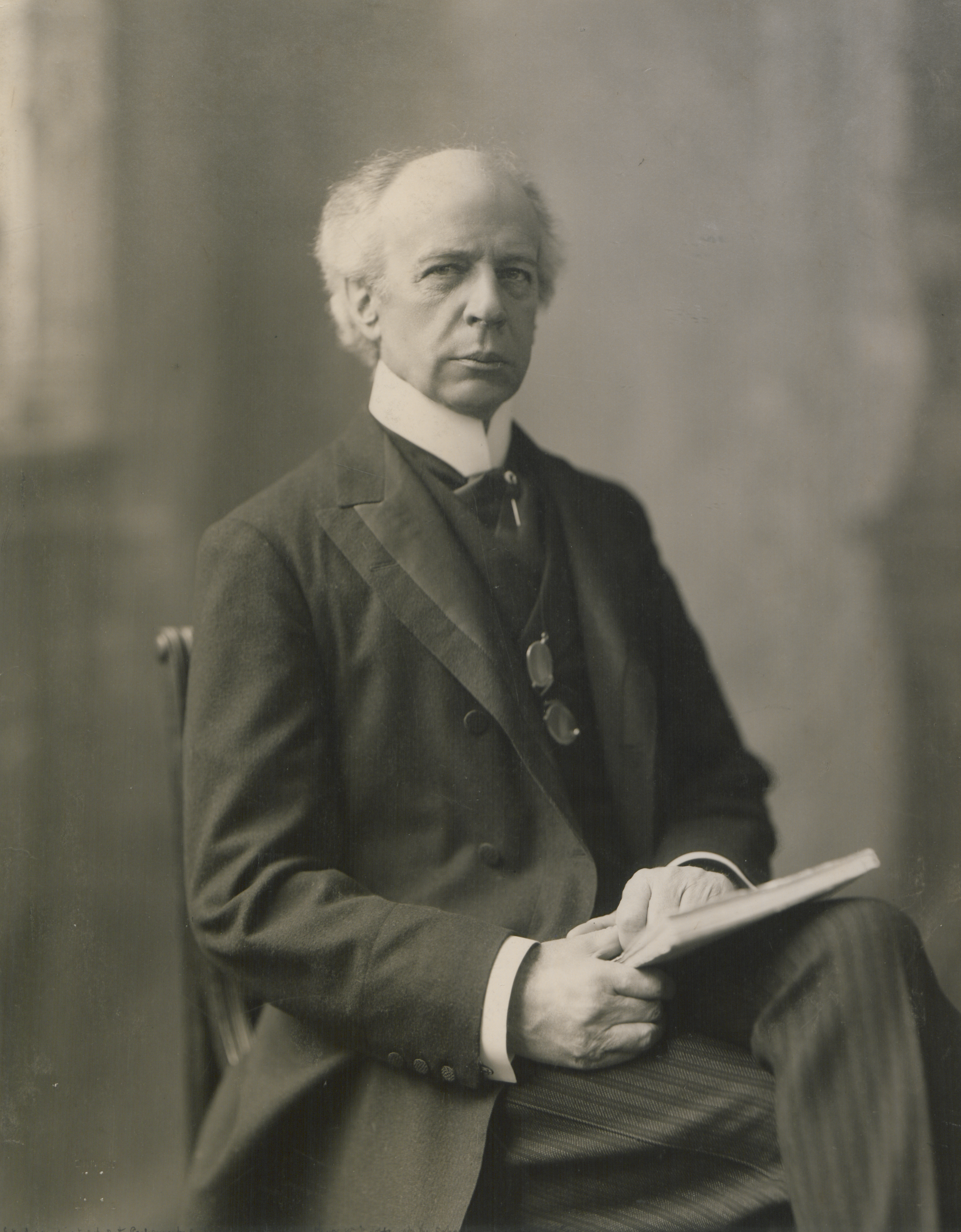
7th prime minister of Canada Sir Wilfrid Laurier (BCL, 1864).

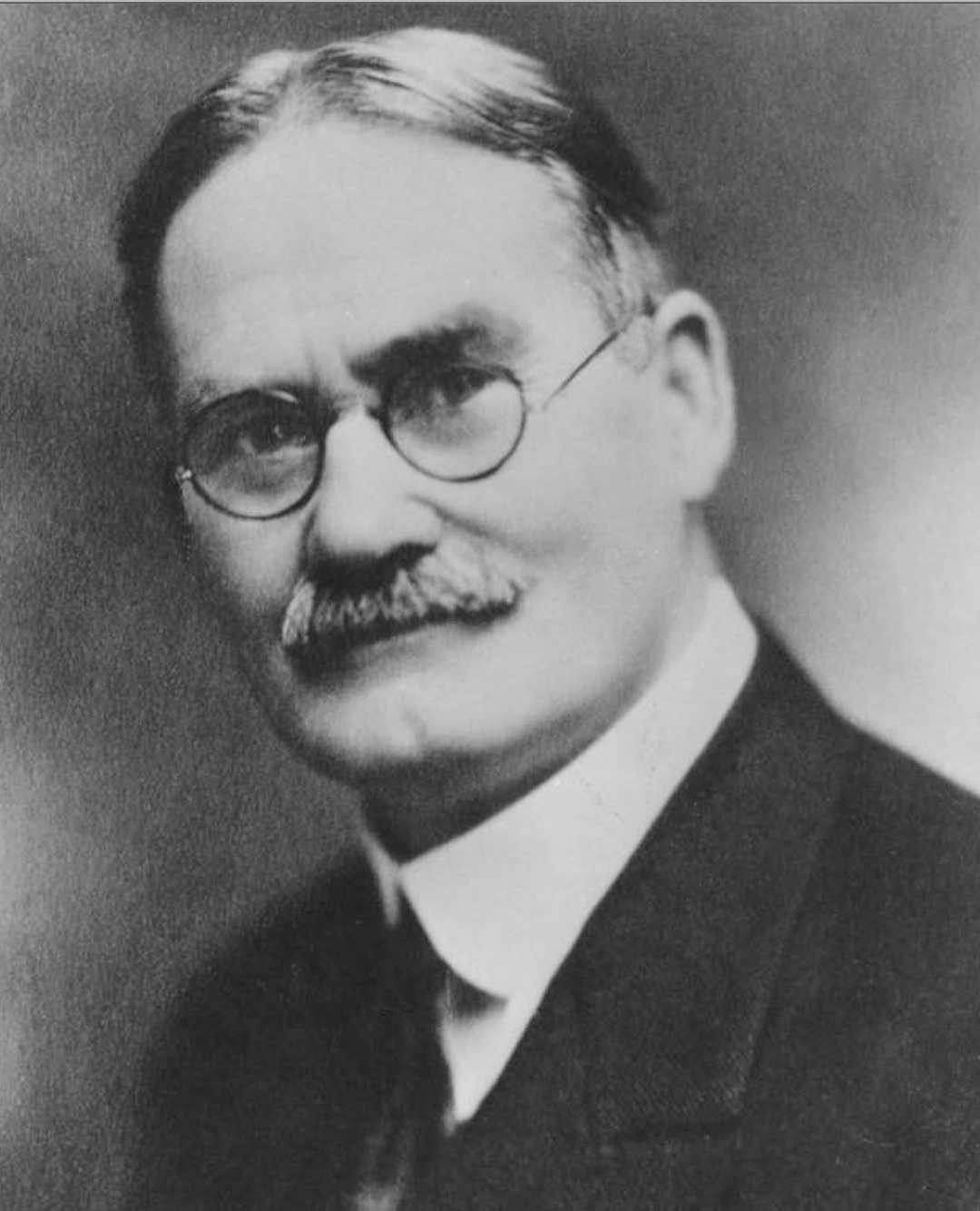
Inventor of the game of basketball James Naismith (BA, 1887).

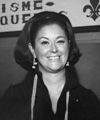
First woman elected to the Quebec National Assembly Marie-Claire Kirkland (BA 1947, BCL 1950).

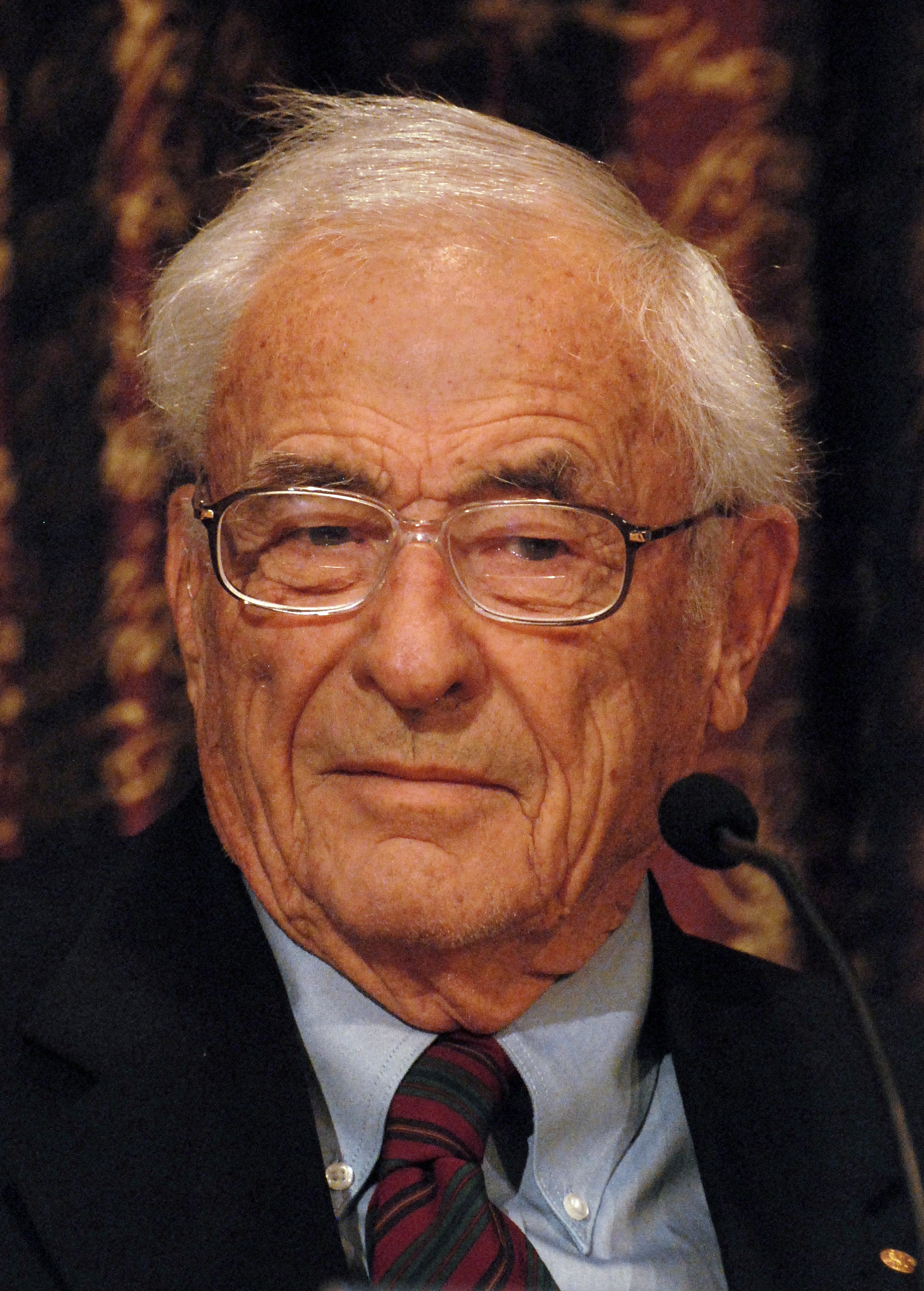
Co-inventor of the CCD and Nobel prize laureate in Physics Willard Boyle (BSc, 1947; MSc 1948; PhD 1950).

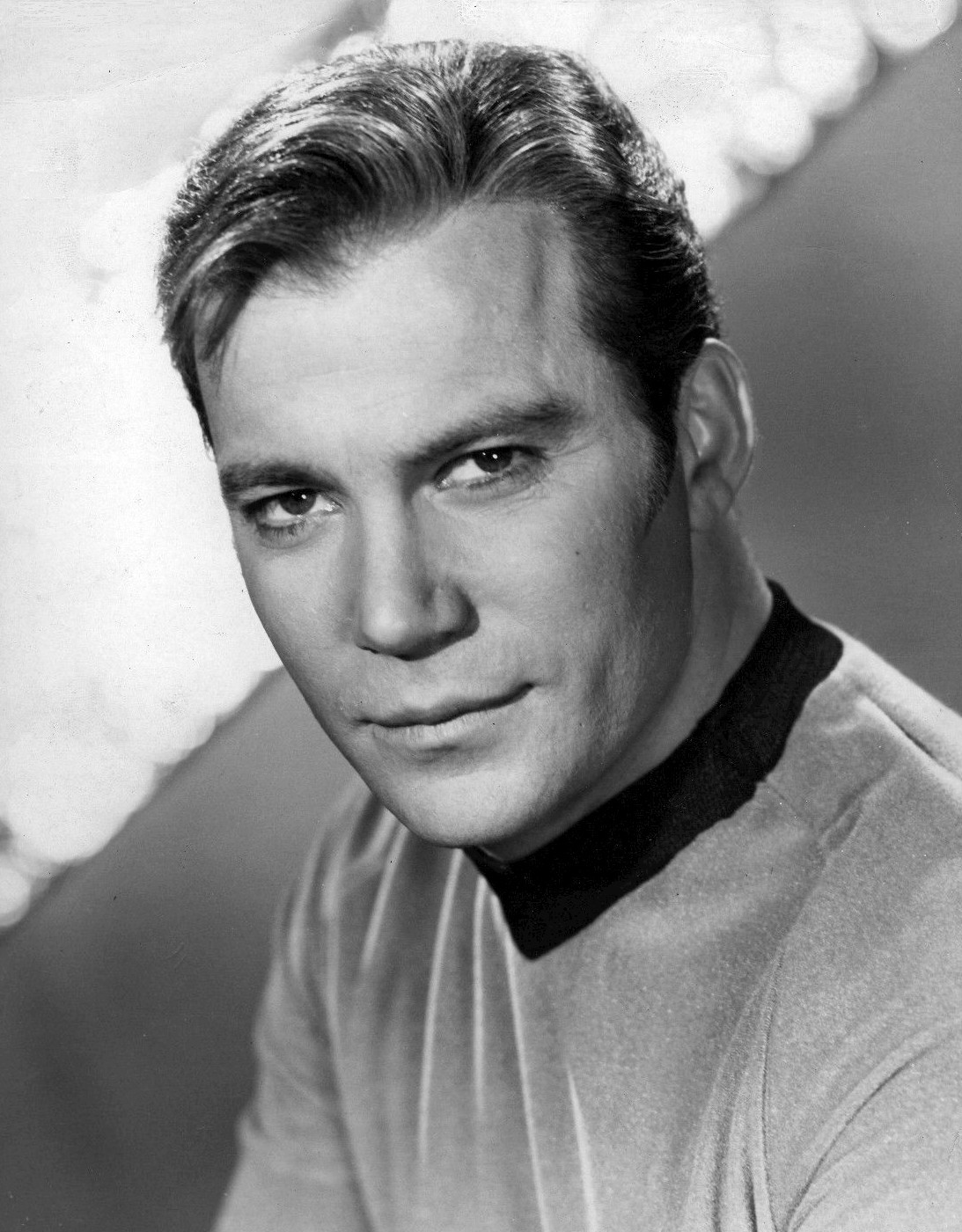
Emmy Award winner known for his portrayal of Captain Kirk in the Star Trek franchise William Shatner (BComm, 1952).

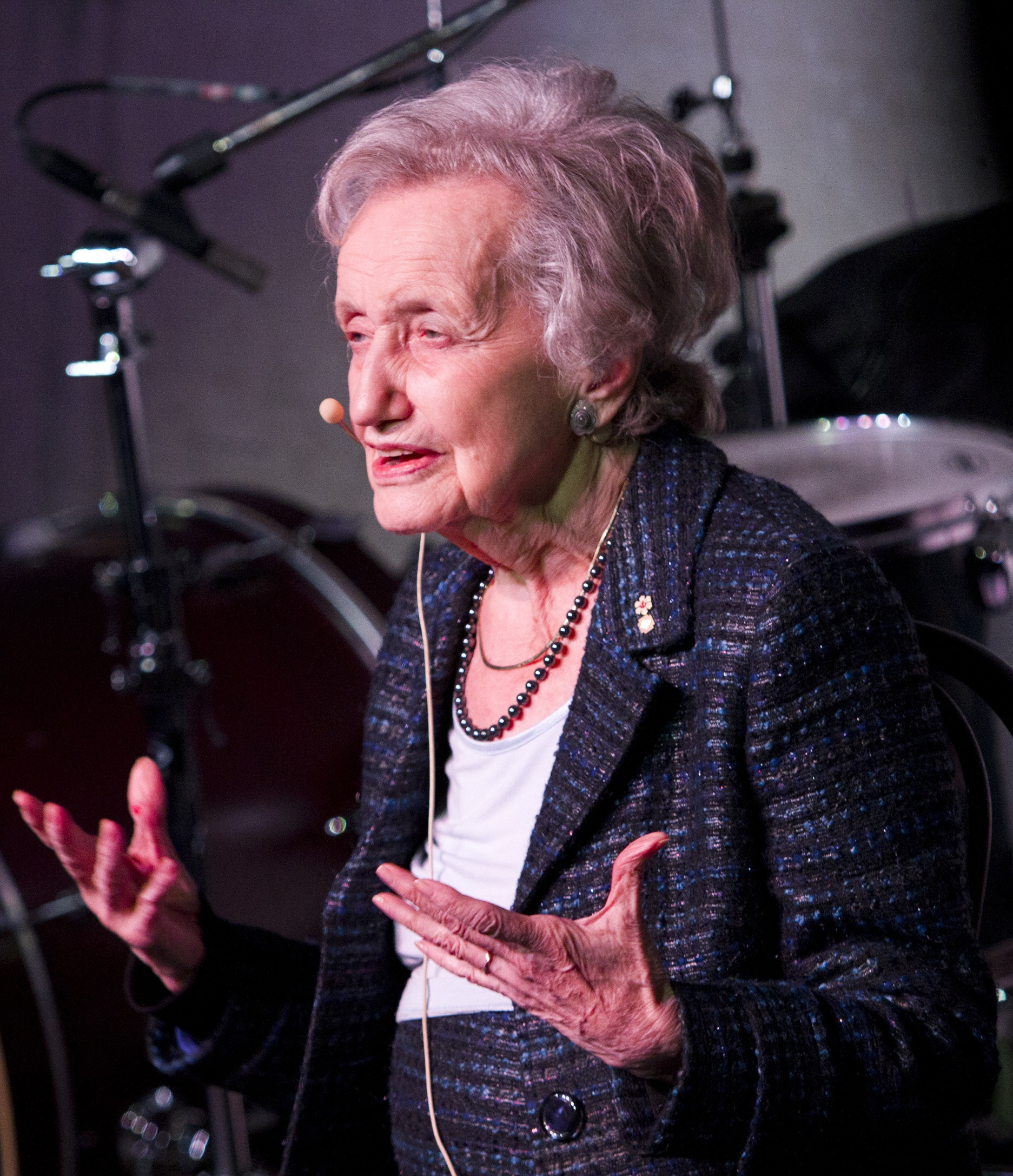
Balzan Prize winner, referred to as "the founder of neuropsychology" Brenda Milner (PhD, 1952)

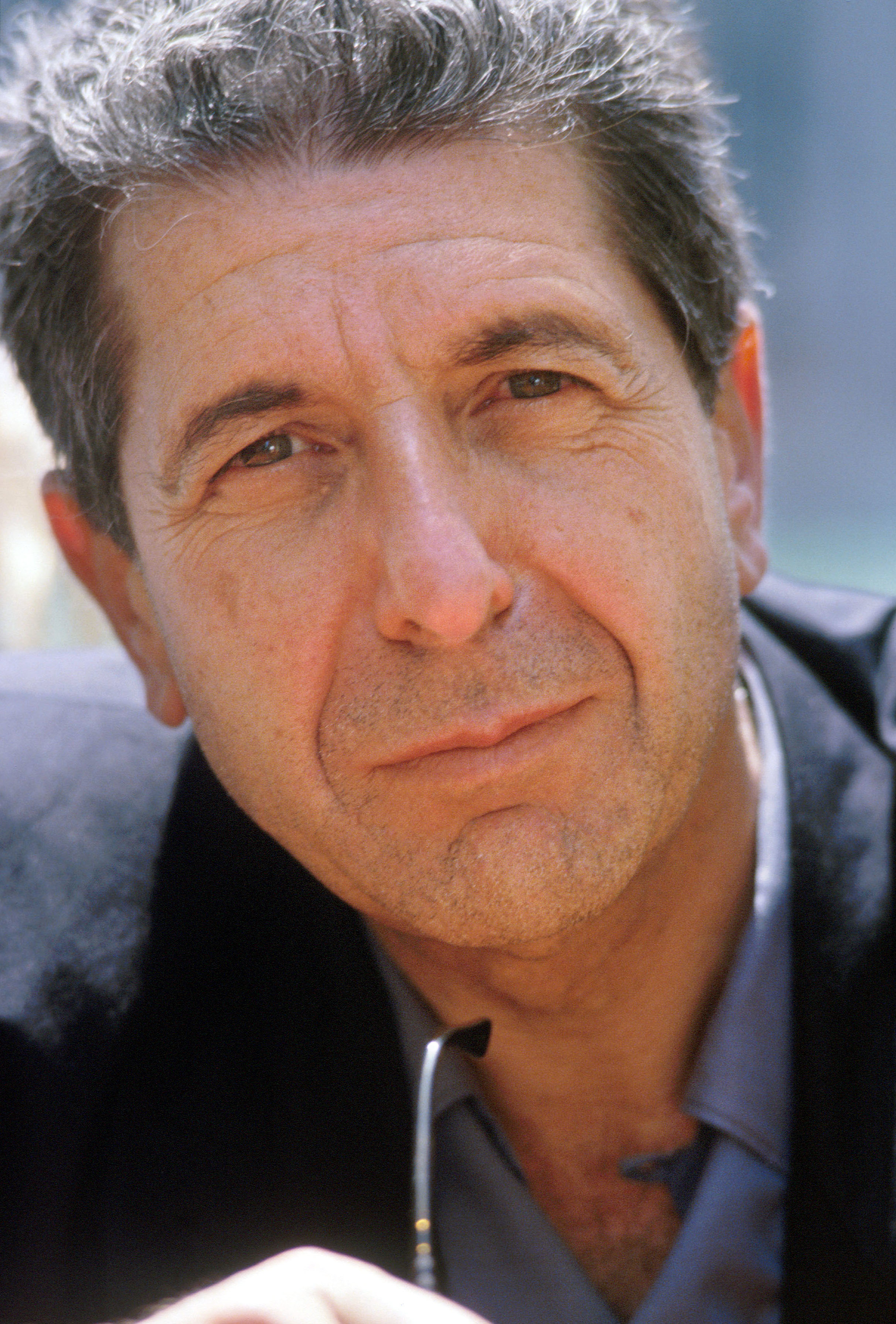
Grammy Award winner and poet Leonard Cohen (BA, 1955).

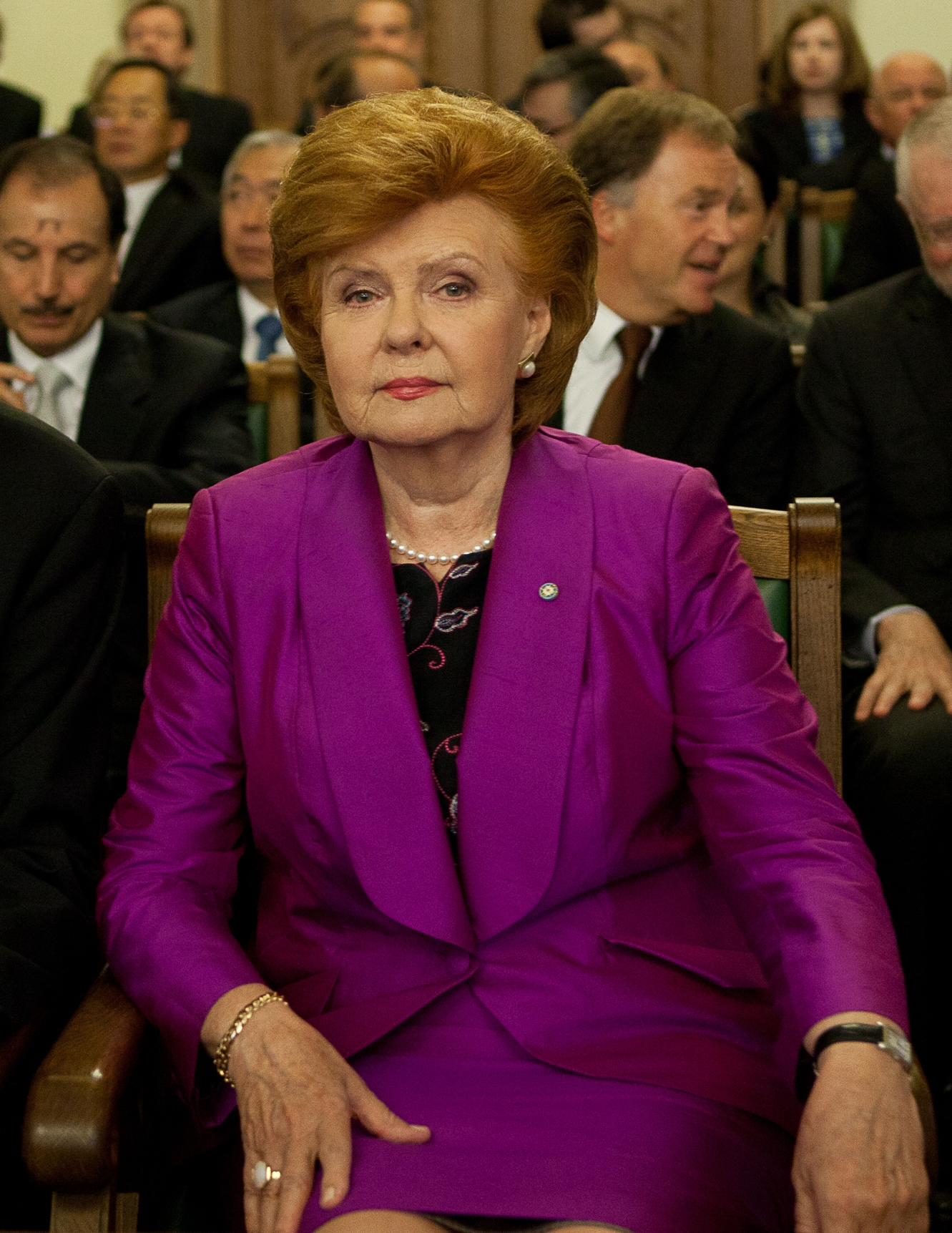
6th President of Latvia Vaira Vīķe-Freiberga (PhD, 1965).

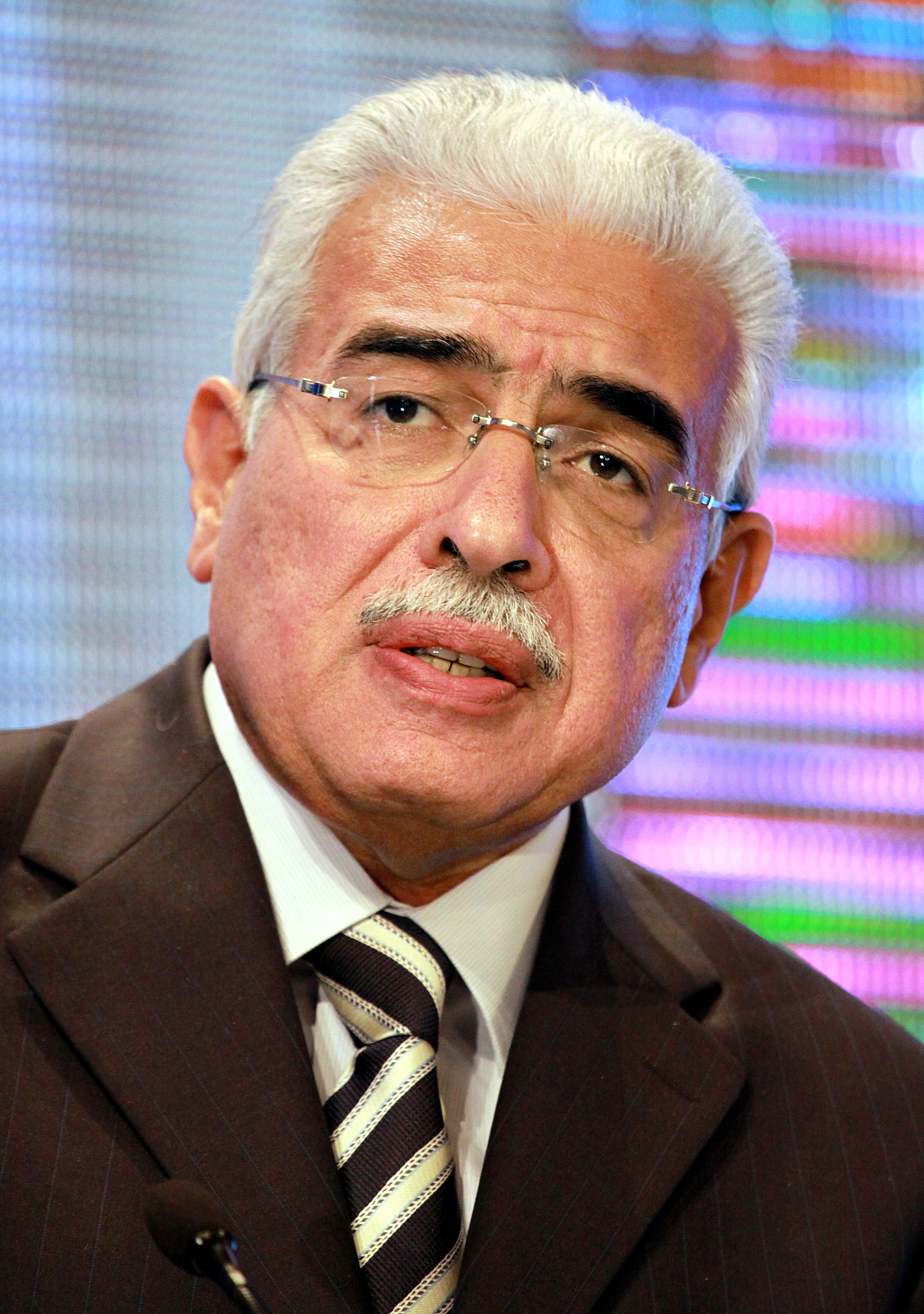
48th Prime Minister of Egypt Ahmed Nazif (PhD, 1983).

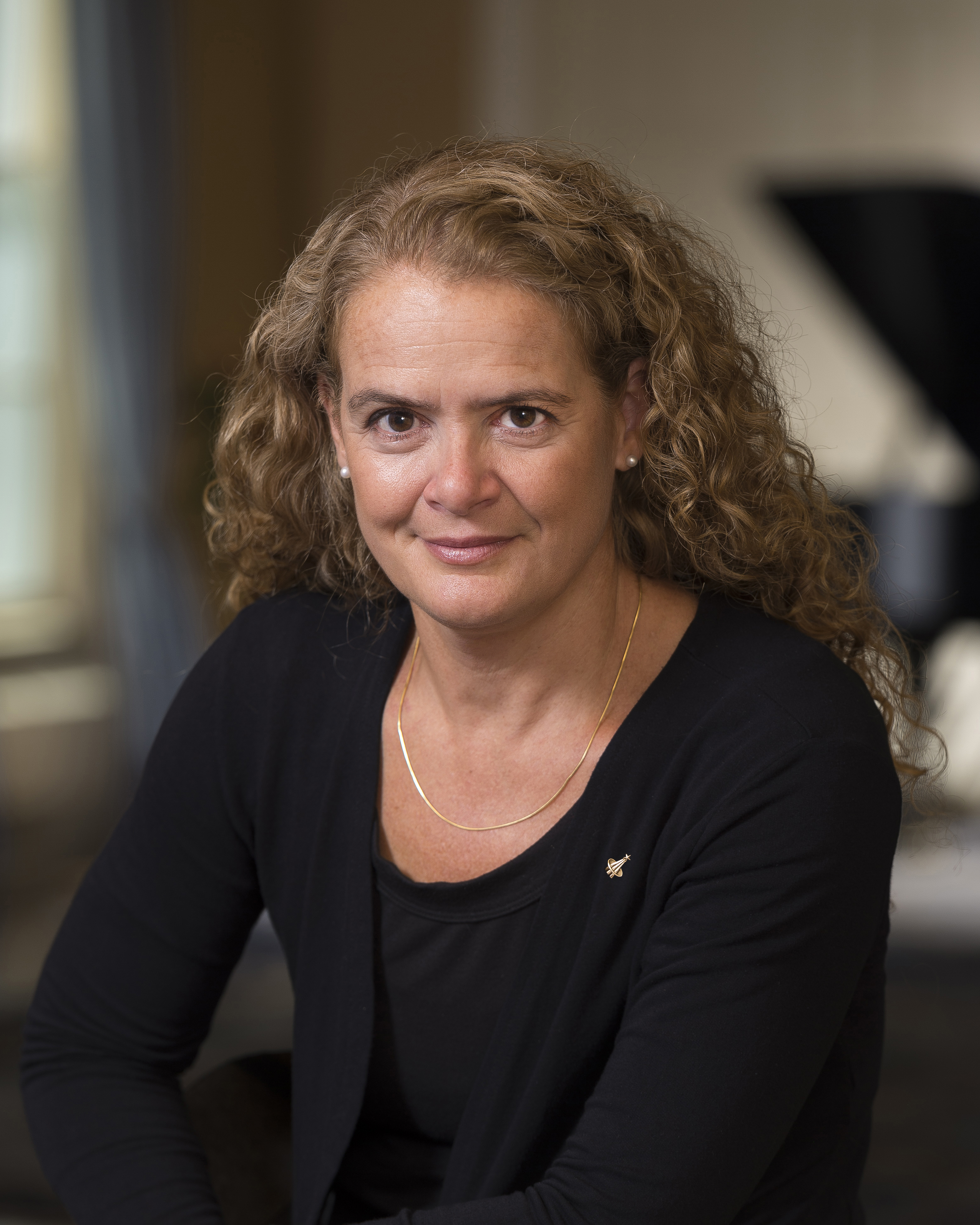
Former astronaut and 29th governor general of Canada Julie Payette (BEng, 1986).

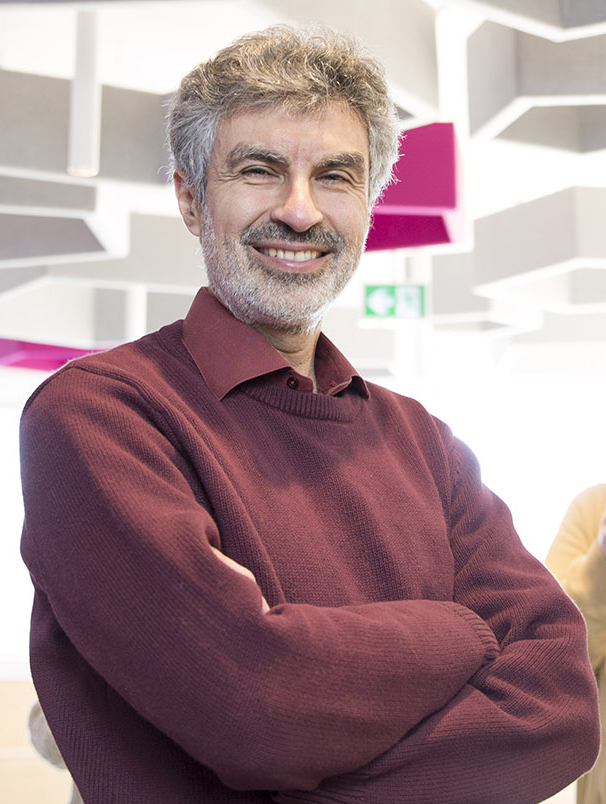
Turing Award winner Yoshua Bengio (BEng, 1986; MSc, 1988; PhD, 1991).

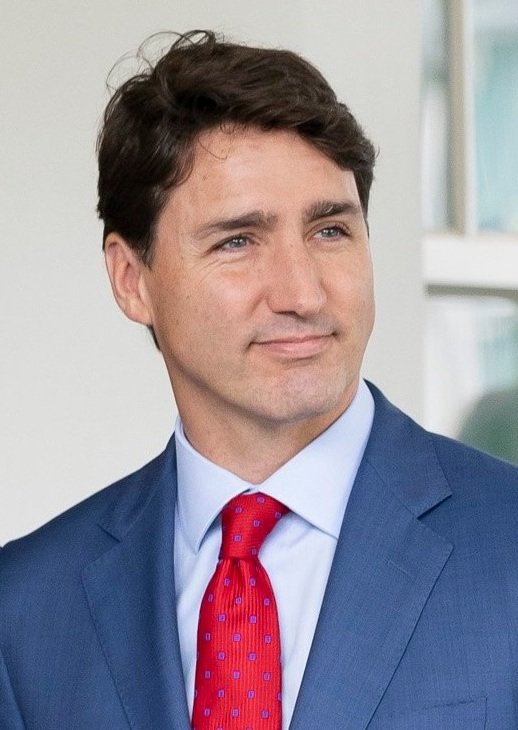
The 23rd prime minister of Canada Justin Trudeau (BA, 1994).

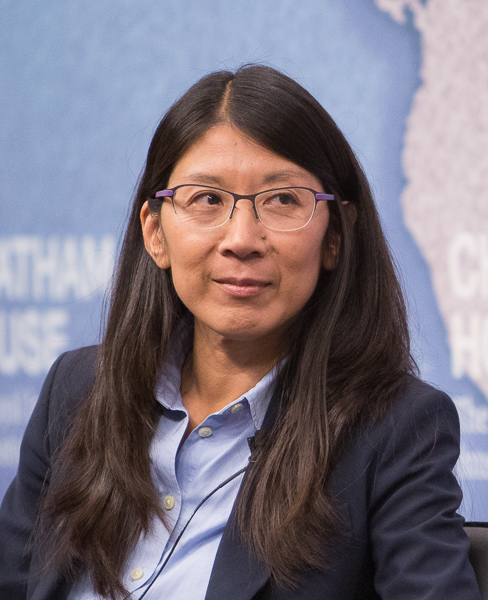
Former international president of Médecins Sans Frontières Joanne Liu (MDCM, 1991; IMHL, 2014).

== See also ==
- List of McGill University people
- McGill University School of Architecture
- Schulich School of Music
- Academic dress of McGill University
- Canadian government scientific research organizations
- Canadian industrial research and development organizations
- Canadian university scientific research organizations
- Cundill History Prize, awarded by McGill
- History Trek, developed by McGill researchers
- List of Canadian universities by endowment
- List of oldest universities in continuous operation
- Maude Abbott Medical Museum
- McGill University Non-Academic Certified Association
- McGill University School of Information Studies
- Montreal Laboratory (for nuclear research, World War II)
- Osler Library of the History of Medicine
- McGill University Department of Social Studies of Medicine
- U15 Group of Canadian Research Universities
- Montreal experiments
