= Zassenhaus =

Zassenhaus is a German surname. Notable people with the surname include:

- Hans Zassenhaus (1912–1991), German mathematician
  - Zassenhaus algorithm
  - Zassenhaus group
  - Zassenhaus lemma
- Hiltgunt Zassenhaus (1916–2004), German philologist who aided Scandinavian prisoners during World War II, sister of Hans Zassenhaus

== See also ==
- Brauerei Zassenhaus, a German brewery in Velbert (see de:Brauerei Zassenhaus)
