= Department of Mathematics and Statistics, McGill University =

Academic department at McGill University

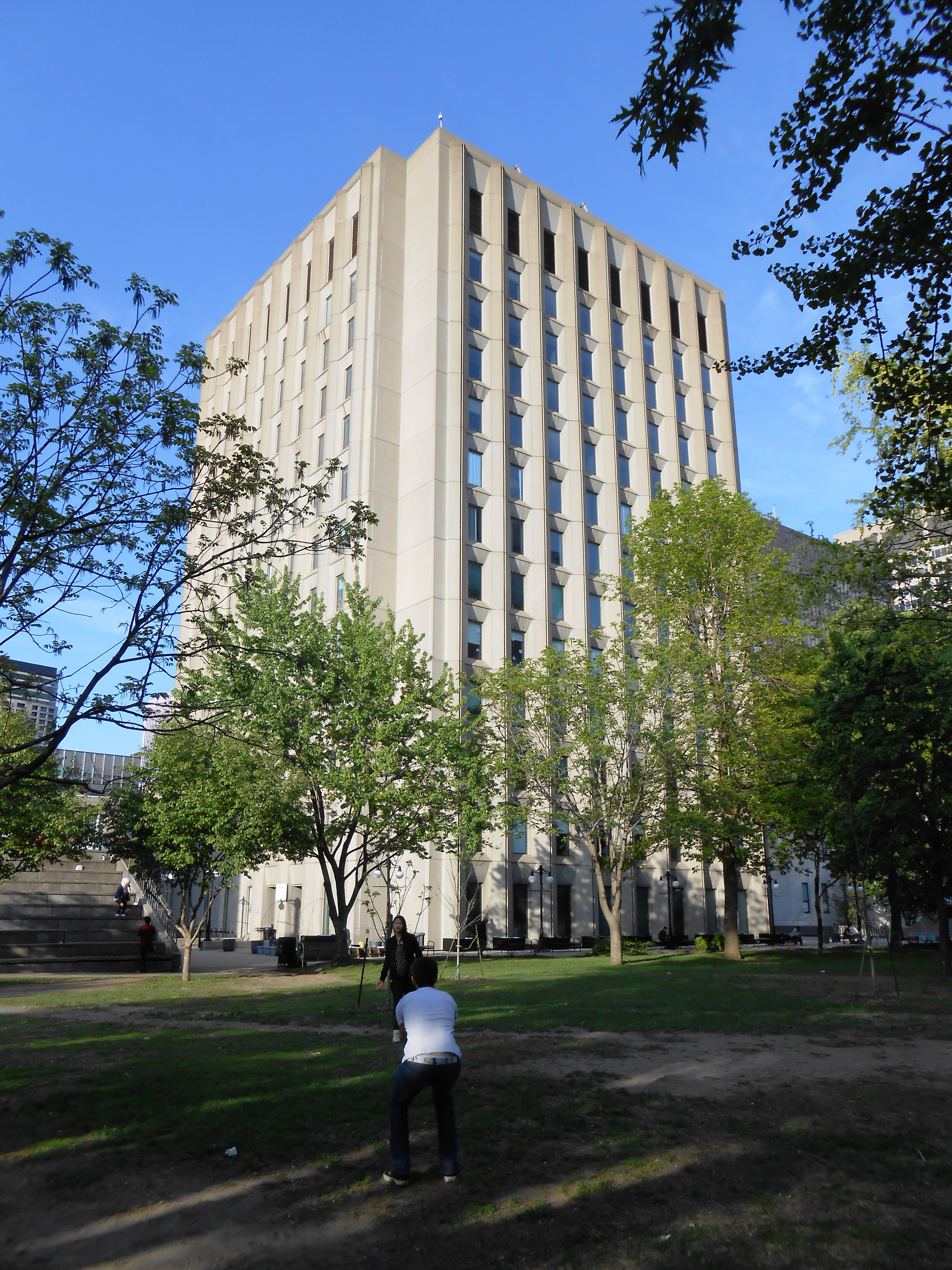
- Burnside Hall, home to the Department of Mathematics and Statistics
- Type: Academic department
- Parent institution: Faculty of Science; McGill University
- Head: Rustum Choksi
- Location: Burnside Hall; 805 Sherbrooke St. West; Montreal, Quebec, Canada; 45.5047573°N 73.5748978°W
- Website: mcgill.ca/mathstat
- Location within Montreal

The Department of Mathematics and Statistics is an academic department at McGill University. It is located in Burnside Hall at McGill's downtown campus in Montreal.

The discipline of mathematics was taught at McGill as early as 1848; however, it was divided into two independent departments until 1924. Following its emergence, it remained almost entirely a service department until the 1940s, when several department members began promoting research within it. The department's library was established at 1971.

== History ==
Mathematics was taught at McGill as early as 1848 when it was a discipline of Natural Philosophy.

Mathematics at McGill was initially divided into two largely independent departments, one under the Faculty of Arts and Science and another under the Faculty of Engineering; the two departments merged in 1924 under the chairmanship of Daniel Murray. Still, mathematics remained subsidiary to other programs, owing to McGill's emphasis on engineering and British-style applied mathematics. Until 1945, Mathematics was almost wholly a service department with only seven faculty members. Though a small graduate program was shared with the Physics Department, most of the students in the program were headed for further graduate work in physics.

In 1945, department members Lloyd Williams and Gordon Pall founded the Canadian Mathematical Congress, which took the lead in persuading the National Research Council to make funds available for the support of pure mathematics. Meanwhile, as chairman of the department, A. H. S. Gillon initiated in 1945 an Applied Mathematics program and in 1948 recommended for appointment to a professorship Hans Zassenhaus, a pure mathematician who began to attract a number of strong graduate students into his program. Zassenhaus, along with Professors Wacław Kozakiewicz, Charles Fox, Edward Rosenthall, and Phil Wallace, was instrumental in developing the Department's Graduate School. McGill's first mathematics Ph.D. was awarded to Joachim Lambek, who obtained his doctorate in 1950 under Zassenhaus's supervision.

In 1963, as public funds came to the university and a larger budget became available, the newly appointment chairman, Edward Rosenthall, concentrated on building a balanced and well-qualified academic team, which could sustain a vigorous graduate program along with the demands made upon the department in a service capacity. Analysis and algebra became strong elements in the department's program in the late 1960s and the early 1970s, and there was also a lively interest in statistics and in applied mathematics. Research in category theory began in 1966, when Lambek decided to promote the subject at McGill. The number of full-time staff in the department had grown to 36 by 1960, and to 56 by 1970.

The Departmental library was established in 1971, and dedicated in 1987 in honour of Edward Rosenthall. At the time of its closure in 2015, the Rosenthall Library held over 14,000 mathematics journals dating from the nineteenth century, more than 10,000 monographs, as well as a collection of rare mathematics books contributed by Professor Niky Kamran. The content of this collection has since been moved to McGill's Schulich Library. The space formerly housing this collection has been transformed into a study space reserved for Mathematics and Statistics students with card access. It features a large communal study area with whiteboards and desks, as well as several smaller breakout rooms separated from the main area by glass walls.

== Research ==
Members of the Department of Mathematics and Statistics are active in directing research in algebraic geometry, analysis, applied mathematics, category theory and logic, discrete mathematics, geometric group theory, number theory, and probability and statistics.

== Notable members ==
=== Current members ===
- Michael Barr
- Henri Darmon, Coxeter–James Prize (1997), Cole Prize (2017), CRM-Fields-PIMS Prize (2017)
- Stephen Drury
- Christian Genest FRSC
- Pengfei Guan FRSC, Sloan Fellowship (1993–1995)
- Jacques Hurtubise FRSC, Coxeter–James Prize (1993)
- Niky Kamran FRSC, CRM-Fields-PIMS Prize (2014)
- Michael Makkai
- Arak Mathai
- Daniel Wise FRS FRSC, CRM-Fields-PIMS Prize (2016), Guggenheim Fellowship (2016)

=== Former members ===
- Marta Bunge, professor (1969–2003)
- Donald Dawson FRS FRSC, associate professor (1963–1970, 2000–2010), CRM-Fields-PIMS Prize (2004)
- Arthur Eve CBE FRS FRSC
- Charles Fox, professor (1949–1967)
- Lisa Jeffrey FRSC, associate professor (1995–1998)
- Alexander Johnson, professor (1857–1903)
- Peter Hammer, faculty member (1969–1972)
- James Harkness FRSC, professor (1903–1923)
- Carl Herz, professor (1970–1995)
- John David Jackson, assistant then associate professor of mathematical physics (1950-1957)
- Donald Kingsbury, assistant professor (1956–1986)
- Joachim Lambek FRSC professor (1950–1992)
- Edmund Allen Meredith
- Daniel Murray, professor (1908–1930), chairman (1924–1930)
- Ram Murty FRSC, professor (1982–1996)
- Jonathan Pila FRS, assistant professor (2003–2005)
- Maksym Radziwill, assistant professor (2016–2018)
- Hans Schwerdtfeger FRSC, professor (1957–1983)
- Jean-Pierre Serre, visitor (1967)
- Charles Thompson Sullivan FRSC, professor (1908–1946), departmental chair (1930–1947)
- Endre Szemerédi, visiting professor (1980); Pólya Prize (1975), Steele Prize (2008), Abel Prize (2012)
- Henry Marshall Tory
- Valentino Tosatti, professor (2020–2022)
- Phil Wallace
- Peter Wynn
- Alexandru Zaharescu, post-doctoral fellow (1997–1999)
- Hans Zassenhaus, professor (1949–1959)

== See also ==
- McGill University School of Computer Science
