= McGill School of Computer Science =

School in Montreal, Canada

School of Computer Science
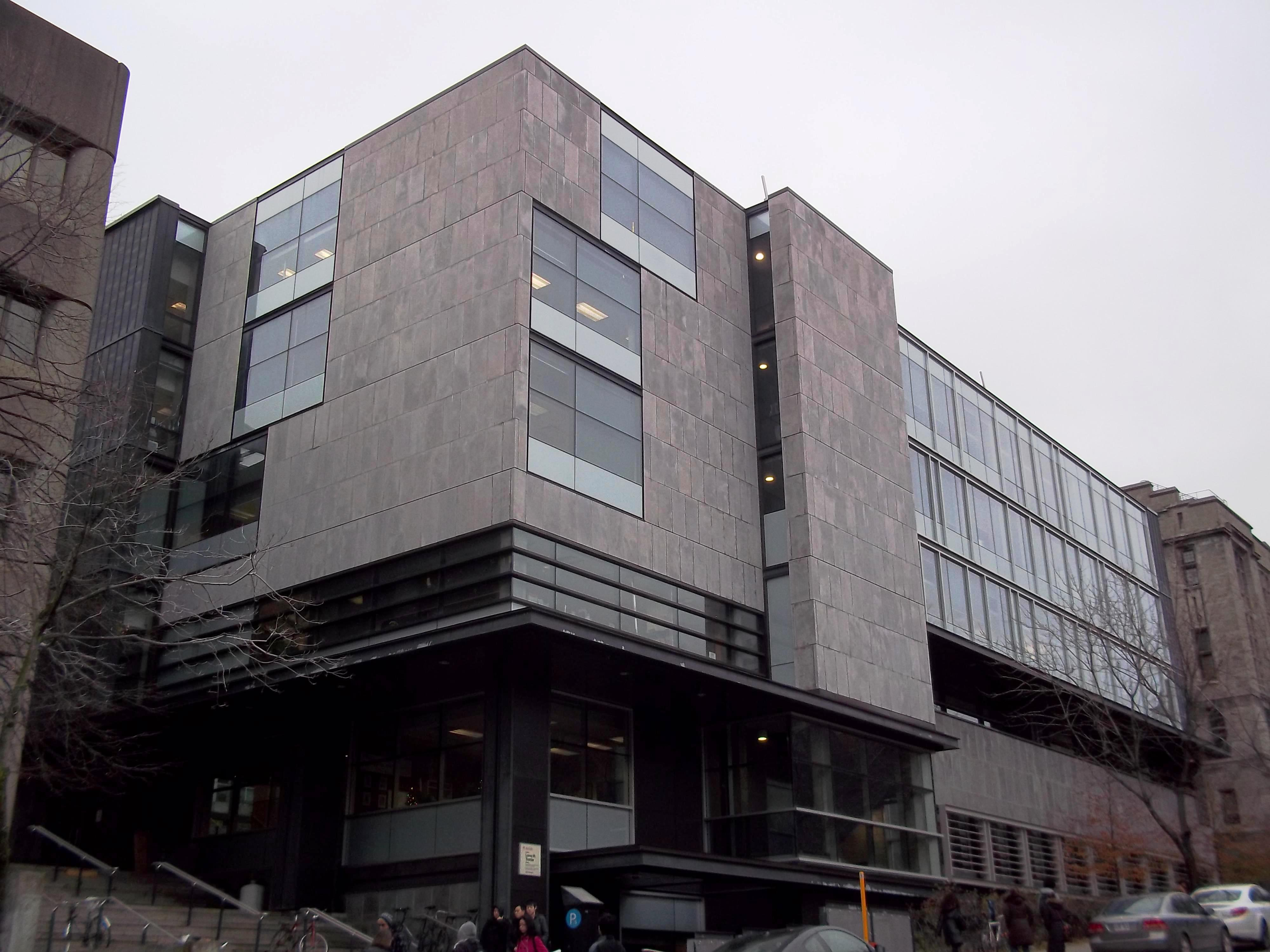
- Lorne M. Trottier Building
- Type: Public
- Established: 1969; 57 years ago
- Parent institution: McGill Faculty of Science
- Director: Brigitte Pientka
- Location: Montreal, Quebec, Canada; 45.50738°N 73.57903°W
- Website: cs.mcgill.ca

The School of Computer Science is an academic department in the Faculty of Science at McGill University in Montreal, Quebec, Canada. The School is the second most funded computer science department in Canada. As of 2024, it has 46 faculty members, 60 Ph.D. students and 100 Master's students.

== History ==
Computer science as a field of study was pioneered at McGill University by George Lee (John) d'Ombrain, then Chair of Electrical Engineering, who is credited with bringing the first computer to McGill in 1958. The first graduate student in computing at McGill University was Gerald Ratzer, who arrived from Cambridge in September 1964. There he pursued an M.Sc. in the Faculty of Graduate Sciences, under the supervision of David Thorpe, Director of the McGill Computing Centre. The School of Computer Science was formally created in 1969.

Computer Science was originally housed in Burnside Hall, which was built in 1970. It is notable for containing the Computing Centre, which contributed funds to Computer Science faculty such as Timothy Howard Merrett. The School moved into the McConnell Building in 1988.

The term "School" was used to reinforce the idea of independence from the Faculty of Engineering. Over the years, the School of Computer Science continued to face difficulties over sharing resources such as academic slots, teaching assistants, and space with their Engineering peers. This was partly due to cross-appointments of faculty from Electrical Engineering, leaving Computer Science understaffed. A minor in Computer Science was created in 1978 with the undergraduate program following in 1979; however, the major program was not created until 1990. Eventually, a heated debate between Dean Dealy of the Faculty of Engineering and Dean Shaver of the Faculty of Science in 1995 led to the School moving to Science in 1997.

== Academics ==
=== Research ===
In 1984, McGill University owned the two USENET nodes in Quebec: one for Computer Science, and the other for computer vision. Around 1992, McGill was also the main network hub for all of Quebec's academic networks. In 1985, the McGill Research Centre for Intelligent Machines (McRCIM) was formed by four researchers – Martin Levine, Steve Zucker, Pierre Bélanger, and George Zames. Today, it is known as the Centre for Intelligent Machines, and seeks to advance the state of knowledge in such domains as robotics, automation, artificial intelligence, computer vision, systems and control theory, and speech recognition.

The first Internet Search Engine, the Archie search engine, was written in 1989 by three McGill Computer Science students, Alan Emtage, Bill Heelan, and J. Peter Deutsch. In September 1993, a new major program for a Bachelor of Arts in Computer Science was established. This led to a ratio of weighted FTEs per professor (23.18) that was among the highest at McGill University. The MUSIC/SP mainframe operating system was developed and marketed by McGill University. With novel features such as file access control and data compression, it was used worldwide until being discontinued in 2007.

=== Programs offered ===
The School currently offers the following programs:

==== Undergraduate ====
- Major, Honours, Liberal, Minor, Major Concentration and Minor concentrations programs in Computer Science
- Major, Liberal and Major Concentration programs in Software Engineering
- Major in Computer Science: Computer Games Option
- Joint Major and Joint Honours in Mathematics and Computer Science
- Joint Major and Joint Honours in Statistics and Computer Science
- Joint Major in Physics and Computer Science
- Joint Major and Joint Honours in Computer Science and Biology

McGill's Computer Science Undergraduate Society, CSUS, is a team of executive members that work together in representing all undergraduate constituents. They are elected every year and host events, workshops, information sessions and are also available to answer student questions and bring up any concerns that they may have.

==== Graduate ====
- Master in Computer Science (Thesis): Computational Science and Engineering
- Master in Computer Science (Thesis): Bioinformatics
- Master in Computer Science (Non-Thesis)
- PhD: advanced research

=== Student Representatives ===
The Computer Science Undergraduate Society (CSUS) is an elected student group tasked with improving student academics and life in the computer science department at McGill University.

== Buildings ==
=== McConnell Engineering Building ===
The School of Computer Science is located in the McConnell Engineering Building, which was donated to McGill University by John W. McConnell in 1959. McConnell was a major benefactor of the University since 1911 and one of its Governors from 1928 until 1958.

=== Trottier Building ===
The Lorne M. Trottier Building houses Computer Science computer labs, classrooms, and study spaces. This building is named after Lorne Trottier, who donated ten million dollars to construct it in 2000/2001. The Trottier Building opened in 2003.

== Notable people ==
=== Faculty ===
- David Avis - Discrete optimization and computational geometry
- Claude Crépeau - Quantum computing and cryptography
- Luc Devroye - Probabilistic analysis of algorithms
- Gregory Dudek - Robotics
- Karyn Moffat - human–computer interaction
- Hans Vangheluwe - co-founder of Modelica
- Tal Arbel - Artificial intelligence
- Laurie Hendren - Compiler Techniques and Tools
- Prakash Panangaden - Probabilistic Systems, Quantum Information
- Joëlle Pineau - Machine Learning
- Brigitte Pientka - Programming languages, computation and logic
- Mathieu Blanchette - computational biology
- Doina Precup - Reinforcement Learning
- Benjamin Fung - cyber security, data privacy, malware analysis, and authorship analysis
- Bruce Reed - Graph theory
- Monty Newborn - chess AI, automated theorem-proving

=== Former faculty ===
- Patrick Hayden - quantum information and quantum computing
- George Marsaglia - random number generation
- Václav Chvátal - graph theory, combinatorics, and combinatorial optimization
- Godfried Toussaint - computational and discrete geometry
- Tomasz Imieliński - databases, data mining, mobile computing, search engine technology
- Mads Haahr (Visiting Professor) - physically-derived random number generation, founder of Random.org

=== Alumni ===
- Alan Emtage creator of Archie
- Changpeng Zhao, founder of Binance
- Yoshua Bengio one of the three "Godfathers of AI"
- Jade Raymond video game producer, creator of Assassin's Creed and Watch Dogs franchises
- David Avis
- Peyush Bansal, founder and CEO of Lenskart
- Bruce Reed, computer scientist
- Ahmed Nazif, former prime minister of Egypt
