= CRC Concise Encyclopedia of Mathematics =

Book by Eric W. Weisstein

- First edition
- Author: Eric W. Weisstein
- Language: English
- Subject: Mathematics
- Publisher: CRC Press
- Publication date: 1999
- Publication place: United States
- Media type: Print (Hardcover and Paperback) and audio-CD
- Pages: 3252
- ISBN: 1584883472

CRC Concise Encyclopedia of Mathematics is a book by American author Eric W. Weisstein.

== Summary ==
The book is presented in a dictionary format. The book is divided into headwords. The book also provides relevant diagrams and illustrations.

== Lawsuits ==
The book became the subject of a lawsuit between CRC Press and Eric W. Weisstein. The CRC Press claimed Weisstein's website MathWorld violated the copyright on the CRC Concise Encyclopedia of Mathematics. During the dispute, a court order shut down MathWorld for over a year starting October 23, 2000. According to Eric Weisstein's personal site, he restarted MathWorld on November 6, 2001. Wolfram Research, Stephen Wolfram, and Eric Weisstein settled with the CRC Press for an undisclosed financial award and several benefits. Among these benefits are the legal rights to reproduce MathWorld in book format again.

== Reception ==
The book has consistently received good reviews.

== Editions ==
- 1st edition, CRC Press, 1999, ISBN 978-1-58488-347-0
- 2nd edition, CRC Press, 2002, ISBN 1584883472
- 3rd edition, CRC Press, 2005, ISBN 9780849319464

== See also ==
- CRC Standard Mathematical Tables
