= Daniel Murray =

Daniel or Dan Murray may refer to:

== Footballers ==
- Dan Murray (Gaelic footballer) (1934–2025), Irish Gaelic footballer
- Dan Murray (English footballer) (born 1982), English footballer
- Dan Murray (Australian footballer) (1912–1992), Australian footballer

== Others ==
- Daniel Murray (bishop) (1768–1852), Irish Roman Catholic Archbishop of Dublin
- Daniel Murray (mathematician) (1862–1934), Canadian mathematician
- Daniel Murray (politician) (1751–1832), American judge and politician in New Brunswick
- Daniel Alexander Payne Murray (1852–1925), American librarian, bibliographer, author, politician, and historian
- Dan Murray (baseball) (born 1973), American former baseball pitcher
- Daniel Murray (rugby league) (born 1996), English rugby league footballer
- Dan Murray, a character from the 1996 Tom Clancy novel Executive Orders
- Dan Murray (runner) (born 1981), American sprinter and runner, 2002 NCAA distance medley relay runner-up for the Wisconsin Badgers track and field team
