= PlanetMath =

Online encyclopedia

- Website type: Online encyclopedia
- Available in: English
- Owners: PlanetMath.org, Ltd.
- Creators: Nathan Egge; Aaron Krowne
- Website: planetmath.org
- Commercial: No
- Registration: GitHub account required to edit sources via pull request
- Current status: Inactive
- Content license: CC BY-SA

PlanetMath is a free, collaborative, mathematics online encyclopedia. Intended to be comprehensive, the project is currently hosted by the University of Waterloo. The site is owned by a US-based nonprofit corporation, "PlanetMath.org, Ltd".

PlanetMath was started when the popular free online mathematics encyclopedia MathWorld was temporarily taken offline for 12 months by a court injunction as a result of the CRC Press lawsuit against the Wolfram Research company and its employee (and MathWorld's author) Eric Weisstein.

== Materials ==
The main PlanetMath focus is on encyclopedic entries. It formerly operated a self-hosted forum, but now encourages discussion via Gitter.

An all-inclusive PlanetMath Free Encyclopedia book of 2,300 pages is available for the encyclopedia contents up to 2006 as a free download PDF file.

=== Content development model ===
PlanetMath implements a specific content creation system called authority model.

An author who starts a new article becomes its owner, that is the only person authorized to edit that article. Other users may add corrections and discuss improvements but the resulting modifications of the article, if any, are always made by the owner. However, if there are long lasting unresolved corrections, the ownership can be removed. More precisely, after two weeks the system starts to remind the owner by mail; at six weeks any user can "adopt" the article; at eight weeks the ownership of the entry is completely removed (and such an entry is called "orphaned").

To make the development more smooth, the owner may also choose to grant editing rights to other individuals or groups.

The user can explicitly create links to other articles, and the system also automatically turns certain words into links to the defining articles. The topic area of every article is classified by the Mathematics Subject Classification (MSC) of the American Mathematical Society (AMS).

The site is supervised by the Content Committee. Its basic mission is to maintain the integrity and quality of the mathematical content and organization of PlanetMath. As defined in its Charter, the tasks of the Committee include:

- Developing/maintaining the standards for PlanetMath content
- Improving individual PlanetMath entries in its Encyclopedia, Book, Paper, and Exposition)
- Developing topic areas
- Developing/improving site and user documentation
- Managing the PlanetMath Request list and Unproved Theorems list
- Improving categorization and other meta-attributes of entries.
- Developing software recommendations for improved content authoring and editorial functions.

=== Technical details ===
PlanetMath content is licensed under the copyleft Creative Commons Attribution-ShareAlike License. All content is written in LaTeX, a typesetting system popular among mathematicians because of its support of the technical needs of mathematical typesetting and its high-quality output.

PlanetMath originally used software written in Perl and running on Linux and the web server Apache. It was known as Noösphere and has been released under the free BSD License. PlanetMath retired Noösphere in favor of another piece of software called Planetary, implemented with Drupal.

=== Related projects ===
Encyclopedic content and bibliographic materials related to physics, mathematics and mathematical physics are developed by PlanetPhysics. The site, launched in 2005, uses similar software (Noosphere), but a significantly different moderation model with emphasis on current research in physics and peer review.

== See also ==
- arXiv
- CogPrints
- List of online encyclopedias
- MathWorld
- MathOverflow
