= Hiltgunt Zassenhaus =

German philologist

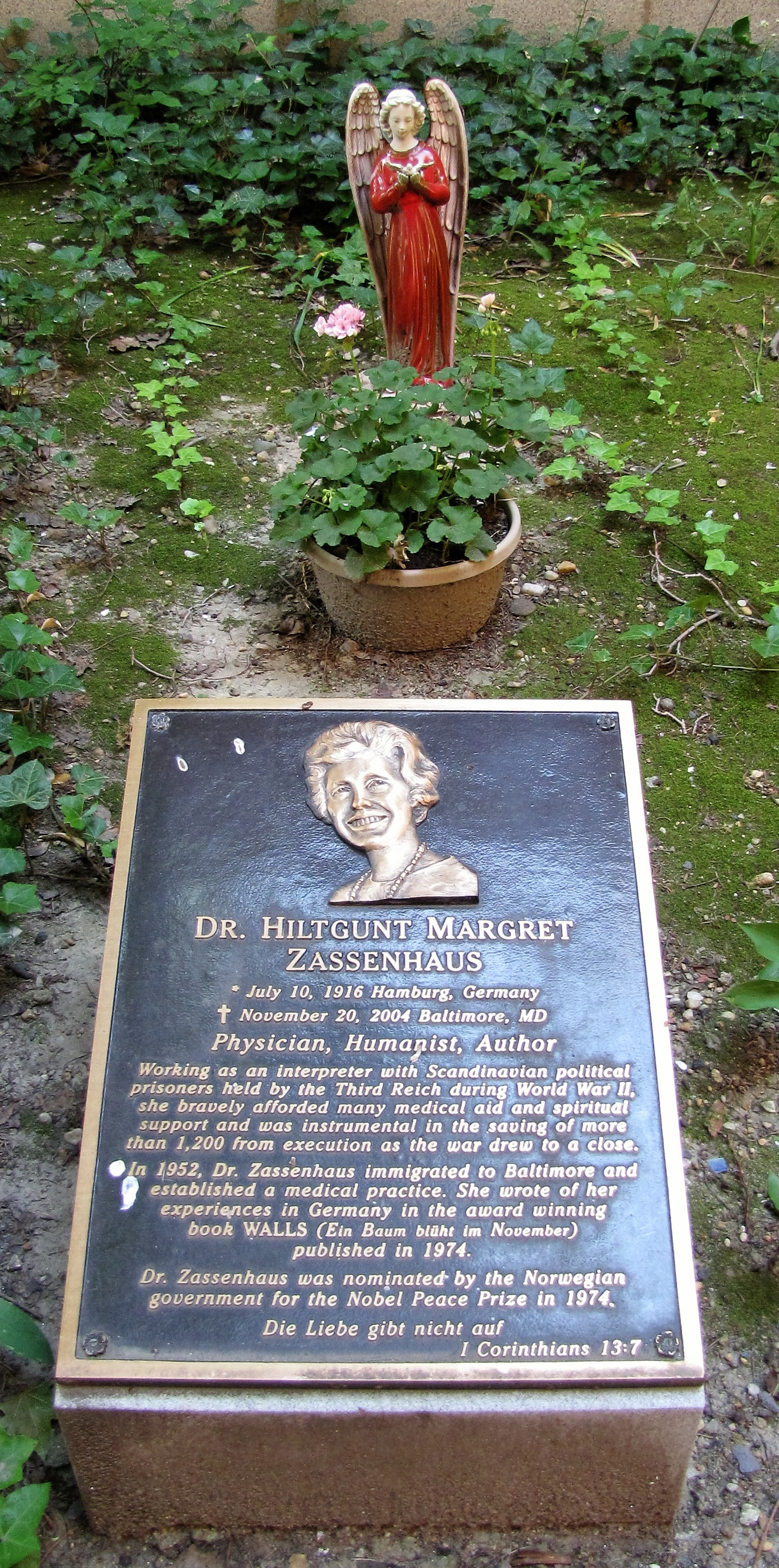
- Grave of Hiltgunt Zassenhaus (2009)
- Born: 10 July 1916; Hamburg, Germany
- Died: 20 November 2004 (aged 88)
- Occupation: philologist
- Awards: Order of Merit of the Federal Republic of Germany; Order of Merit; Order of the Dannebrog; Order of St. Olav

Hiltgunt Margret Zassenhaus (10 July 1916 – 20 November 2004) was a German philologist who worked as an interpreter in Hamburg, Germany during World War II, and later as a physician in the United States. She was honoured for her efforts to aid prisoners in Nazi Germany during World War II.

== Early life ==
Hiltgunt Zassenhaus was born in Hamburg to Julius H. and Margret Ziegler Zassenhaus. Her father was a historian and school principal who lost his job when the Nazi regime came to power in 1933. Her brothers were the mathematician Hans (known for the butterfly lemma and the Zassenhaus group), and physicians Günther and Willfried.

Following a bicycling holiday in Denmark in 1933, she decided to study philology, specializing in the Scandinavian languages. She graduated from the University of Hamburg with a degree in Norwegian and Danish language in 1939 and continued her language studies at the University of Copenhagen.

== World War II ==
In autumn 1940, Zassenhaus was employed as interpreter at the German office for the censorship of letters. She resigned this job in 1942 and started studying medicine in Hamburg. Later in 1942, she was asked by the prosecutor in Hamburg to censor letters to and from Norwegian prisoners in the Zuchthaus in Fuhlsbüttel, Hamburg. She initially refused, but after further pressure, she accepted on the condition that she be allowed to work independently. Instead of censoring the mail, she added messages urging the recipients to send food or warm clothing.

According to the German prison rules, the prisoners were allowed to receive regular visits, and the Norwegian priests in Hamburg were authorized to visit the prisoners on behalf of their families. She was assigned to interpret for and watch the priests during their visits. Later, she also interpreted for Danish priests and prisoners. She began smuggling in food, medicine, and writing materials. She was aided by the suspicion of the authorities that, because of her position in the Department of Justice, she was a member of the Gestapo.

Towards the end of the war, the prisoners were moved to various prisons all over Germany, and the visits, to more than 1,000 Scandinavian prisoners scattered in 52 prisons, required long journeys. Zassenhaus maintained her own records in order to keep track of where the prisoners were being held; these files became important for the later evacuation by the White Buses in 1945.

With the war in Europe nearing its end, Zassenhaus learned of "Day X", when all political prisoners were to be killed. She passed on her information and her files of prisoner locations to either the Red Cross or Swedish Count Bernadotte. A deal was negotiated; 1200 Scandinavian prisoners were freed and transported out of Germany.

Zassenhaus wrote about her experiences during the war in her 1947 book Halt Wacht im Dunkel. An English translation, Walls, was published in 1974. In 1978, she was featured in a British television series called Women in Courage about four women who defied the Nazis. It was produced by Peter Morley, himself a German refugee. The other women were Maria Rutkiewicz, a Polish woman; Sigrid Helliesen Lund, a Norwegian; and Mary Lindell, a British woman.

== Later years and death ==
After the war, Zassenhaus was unable to complete her studies at the University of Hamburg due to the damage inflicted on the city. As Germans had been prohibited from entering Denmark, Zassenhaus was smuggled into the country in 1947 in a fish truck.

Afterward, the Danish parliament passed a special law to legitimize her immigration. She continued her medical studies at the University of Bergen, where she finished the first part of the course, and finally graduated as a physician from the University of Copenhagen. She emigrated to Baltimore in 1952, where she worked as a practising physician.

Hiltgunt Zassenhaus died on 20 November 2004, aged 88.

== Honours ==
Zassenhaus is the only person from Germany decorated with the Royal Norwegian Order of St. Olav for her activities during World War II. She was also awarded the Red Cross Medal, the Danish Order of the Dannebrog, the German Bundesverdienstkreuz, and the British Cross of the Order of Merit. In 1974, the Norwegian government nominated her for the Nobel Peace Prize.
