= CRC Handbook of Chemistry and Physics =

Comprehensive one-volume reference resource for science research

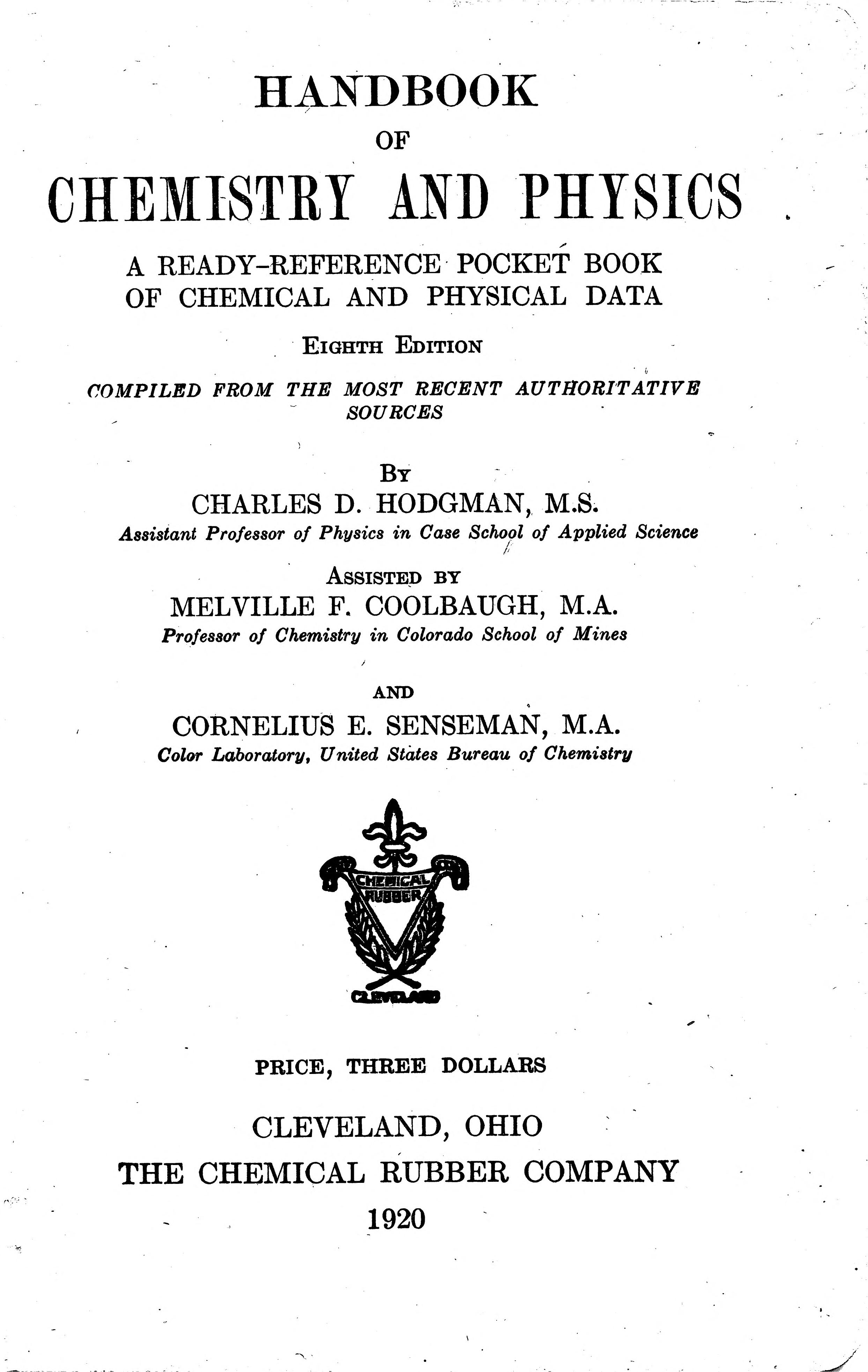
- Title page of the 8th edition, published in 1920
- Subject: Chemistry
- Publisher: CRC Press (formerly The Chemical Rubber Company)
- Pages: 1624 (102nd ed.)
- ISBN: 9780367417246 (101st ed.)
- Website: https://hbcp.chemnetbase.com

The CRC Handbook of Chemistry and Physics is a comprehensive one-volume reference resource for science research. It was first published in 1914. It is known colloquially among chemists as the "Rubber Bible", as CRC originally stood for "Chemical Rubber Company".

As late as the 1962–1963 edition (3604 pages), the Handbook contained myriad information on many branches of science and engineering. Sections in that edition include: Mathematics, Properties and Physical Constants, Chemical Tables, Properties of Matter, Heat, Hygrometric and Barometric Tables, Sound, Quantities and Units, and Miscellaneous. Mathematical Tables from Handbook of Chemistry and Physics was originally published as a supplement to the handbook up to the 9th edition (1952); afterwards, the 10th edition (1956) was published separately as CRC Standard Mathematical Tables. Earlier editions included sections such as "Antidotes of Poisons", "Rules for Naming Organic Compounds", "Surface Tension of Fused Salts", "Percent Composition of Anti-Freeze Solutions", "Spark-gap Voltages", "Greek Alphabet", "Musical Scales", "Pigments and Dyes", "Comparison of Tons and Pounds", "Twist Drill and Steel Wire Gauges" and "Properties of the Earth's Atmosphere at Elevations up to 160 Kilometers". Later editions focus almost exclusively on chemistry and physics topics and eliminated much of the more "common" information.

CRC Press is a publisher of engineering handbooks and references and textbooks across virtually all scientific disciplines.

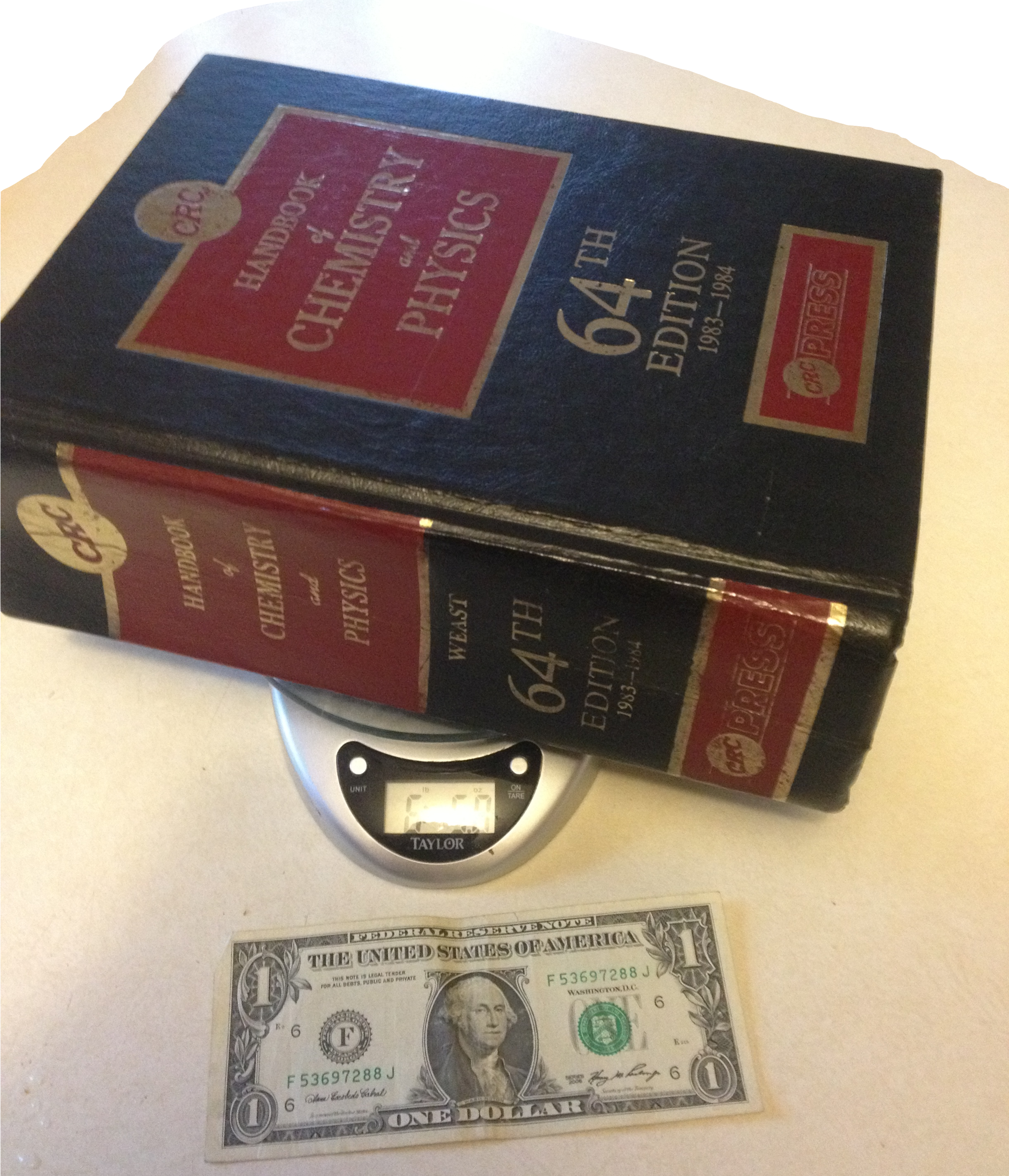
64th Edition of CRC Handbook of Chemistry and Physics with an American dollar bill for scale; weighs 6 pounds 5.0 ounces (2.86 kg)

== Contents by edition ==
- 7th edition
  - Mathematical Tables
  - General Chemical Tables
  - Properties of Matter
  - Heat
  - Hygrometric and Barometric Tables
  - Sound
  - Electricity and Magnetism
  - Light
  - Miscellaneous Tables
  - Definitions and Formulae
  - Laboratory Arts and Recipes
  - Photographic Formulae
  - Measures and Units
  - Wire Tables
  - Apparatus Lists
  - Problems
  - Index
- 22nd–44th editions
  - Section A: Mathematical Tables
  - Section B: Properties and Physical Constants
  - Section C: General Chemical Tables/Specific Gravity and Properties of Matter
  - Section D: Heat and Hygrometry/Sound/Electricity and Magnetism/Light
  - Section E: Quantities and Units/Miscellaneous
  - Index
- 45th–70th editions
  - Section A: Mathematical Tables
  - Section B: Elements and Inorganic Compounds
  - Section C: Organic Compounds
  - Section D: General Chemical
  - Section E: General Physical Constants
  - Section F: Miscellaneous
  - Index
- 71st–102nd editions
  - Section 1: Basic Constants, Units, and Conversion Factors
  - Section 2: Symbols, Terminology, and Nomenclature
  - Section 3: Physical Constants of Organic Compounds
  - Section 4: Properties of the Elements and Inorganic Compounds
  - Section 5: Thermochemistry, Electrochemistry, and Kinetics (or Thermo, Electro & Solution Chemistry)
  - Section 6: Fluid Properties
  - Section 7: Biochemistry
  - Section 8: Analytical Chemistry
  - Section 9: Molecular Structure and Spectroscopy
  - Section 10: Atomic, Molecular, and Optical Physics
  - Section 11: Nuclear and Particle Physics
  - Section 12: Properties of Solids
  - Section 13: Polymer Properties
  - Section 14: Geophysics, Astronomy, and Acoustics
  - Section 15: Practical Laboratory Data
  - Section 16: Health and Safety Information
  - Appendix A: Mathematical Tables
  - Appendix B: CAS Registry Numbers and Molecular Formulas of Inorganic Substances (72nd–75th)
  - Appendix C: Sources of Physical and Chemical Data (83rd–)
  - Index

== See also ==
- CRC Concise Encyclopedia of Mathematics
- CRC Standard Mathematical Tables
