= Burnside Hall =

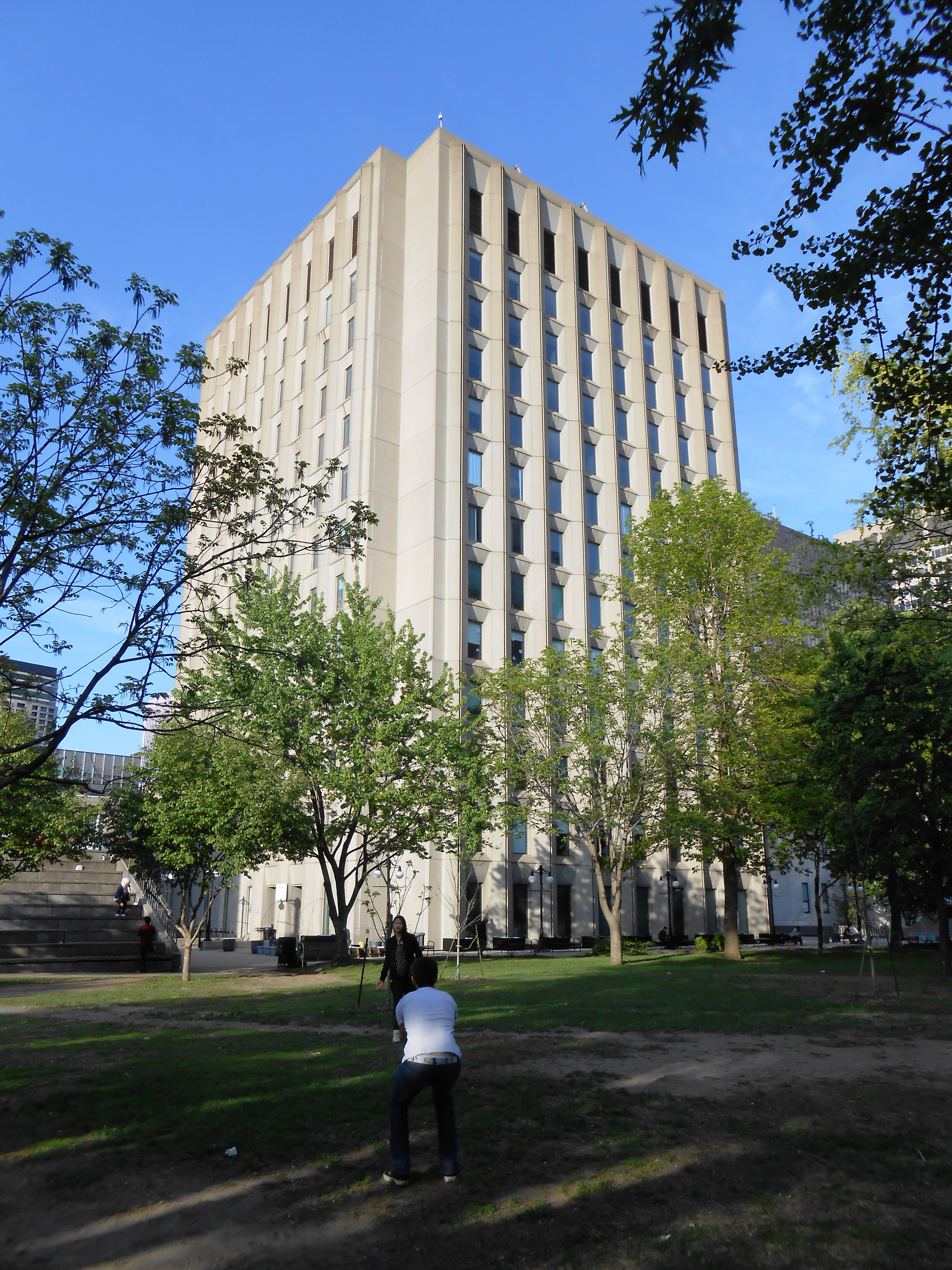
- View from centre of Lower Field (2013)
- Interactive map of the Burnside Hall area

General information
- Architectural style: Brutalism
- Location: 805 Sherbrooke Street West, Montreal, Quebec, Canada
- Coordinates: 45.5048°N 73.5749°W
- Completed: 1970
- Affiliation: McGill University

Height
- Height: 48.75 m (159.9 ft)

Technical details
- Material: Concrete
- Floor count: 14

Design and construction
- Architecture firm: Marshall, Merrett, and Associates

Burnside Hall (French: Pavillon Burnside) is a McGill University building located at 805 Sherbrooke Street West, on the university's downtown campus in Montreal, Quebec. It is named after Burnside Place, the Montreal estate of James McGill, the university's founder. Built in 1970 by Marshall, Merrett, and Associates to accommodate the Faculty of Science, the thirteen-storey building is constructed in Brutalist style and stands just northeast of the Roddick Gates, in the centre of McGill's campus.

The building currently houses the Departments of Atmospheric & Oceanic Sciences, Geography, Mathematics and Statistics, the Network and Communications Services (NCS), the Walter Hitschfeld Geographic Information Centre (GIC) and the Edward Rosenthall Mathematics & Statistics Libraries at the university.

== Layout ==
Burnside is located south of the Schulich library (formerly the Macdonald-Stewart Library and before that the Macdonald Physics Building), southeast of the Pulp and Paper Research Institute and northeast of the Otto Maass Chemistry Building. Burnside connects to these buildings through an underground tunnel system, and can also be accessed from the outside directly from McGill's Lower Field through the building's main entrance.

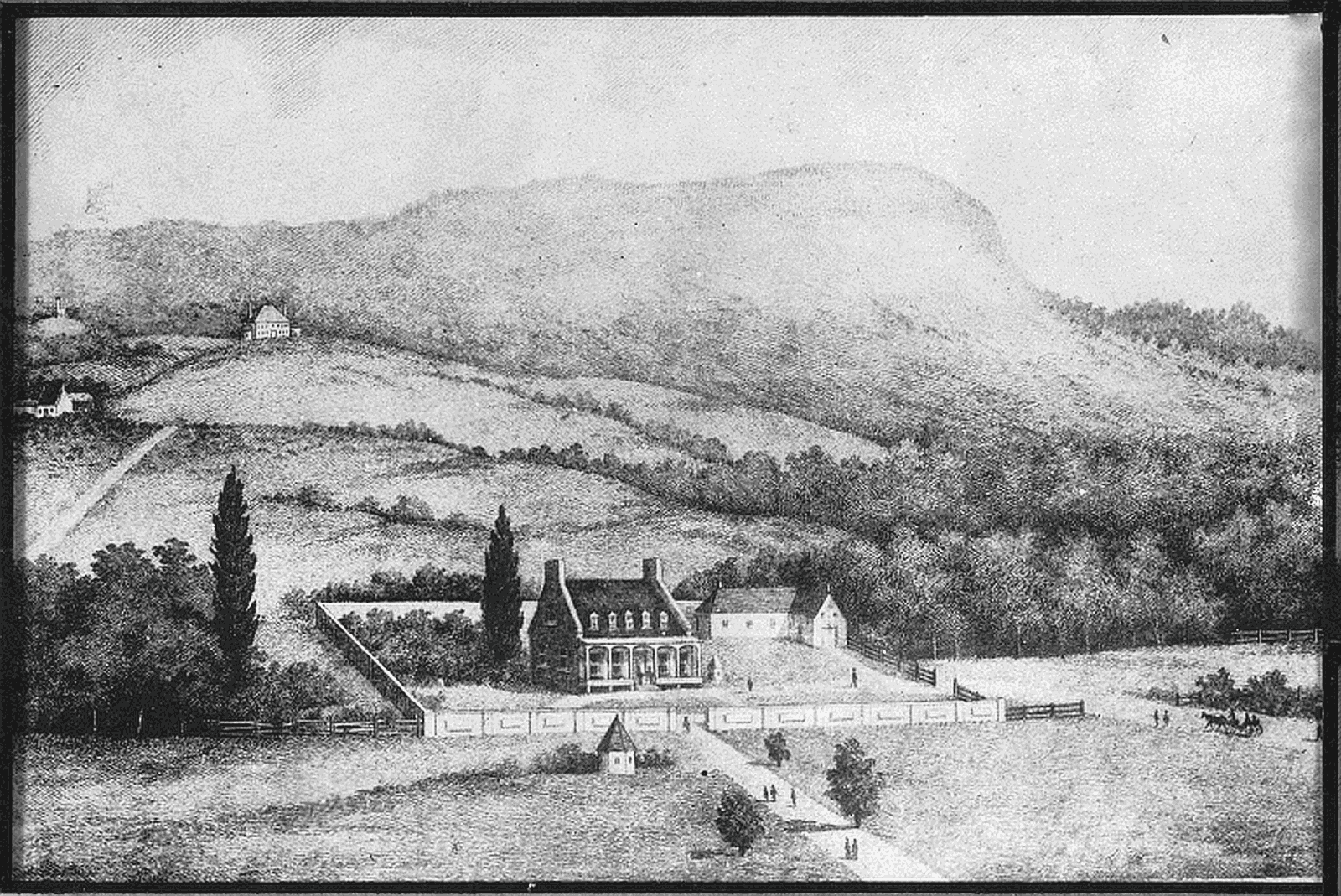
Burnside Place, James McGill's estate.

The basement contains the largest classrooms, under the building's concrete terrace. The basement also provides a study space open to students 24/7, and is one of the most popular locations on campus for tutorials, group study, and lunch. It contains a café, computer labs, tables and sofas. The first floor is used as a lobby and the second floor belongs to the Computing Centre, which contains a wide variety of computing and graphic laboratories and facilities. The Department of Atmospheric & Oceanic Sciences is located on three floors of Burnside Hall, the Department of Geography occupies floors three through seven with the Walter Hitschfeld Geographic Information Centre (GIC) on floor five, while the Department of Mathematics and Statistics, the Network and Communications Services (NCS), and the Edward Rosenthall Mathematics & Statistics Libraries are located elsewhere within the building.

The roof contains meteorological equipment belonging to the Department of Atmospheric & Oceanic Sciences for the study of wind, clouds and precipitation in the city. This equipment includes a radar wind profiler and a laser ceilometer.

== Design ==
Burnside Hall was completed in 1970 in Brutalist style by the architecture firm Marshall, Merrett and Associates. The building contains no ornament on its facade, which comprises a repetitive pattern of precast concrete slabs with fixed, glazed windows throughout. Its concrete shell was intended to blend well with the colour and texture of other buildings on campus, namely the Leacock Building and McLennan Library. The building was designed in a way that it could be expanded by an additional five storeys if need be.

== See also ==
- McGill University buildings and structures
- McCall MacBain Arts Building
- Macdonald-Harrington Building
- McGill School of Architecture
