= Benjamin Fung =

Hong Kong-born Canadian computer scientist

Benjamin C. M. Fung
- Born: Kowloon, Hong Kong
- Education: Simon Fraser University
- Scientific career
- Fields: Data mining; Machine learning; Information privacy; Cyber security
- Workplaces: McGill University School of Information Studies
- Doctoral advisor: Ke Wang

Benjamin Fung is a Hong Kong-born Canadian computer scientist. He is a full professor in the School of Information Studies at McGill University, and was a Canada Research Chair in Data Mining for Cybersecurity from 2015 to 2025. His research focuses on developing data mining and machine learning methods in the areas of cyber security, data privacy, malware analysis, and authorship analysis.

== Education ==
Fung received his B.Sc. (1999), M.Sc. (2003) and Ph.D. (2007) degrees in computing science from Simon Fraser University in Canada, and was designated a Professional Engineer (P.Eng.) in Ontario in 2009.

== Career ==
From 1999 to 2003, Fung worked as a software developer for BusinessObjects in Vancouver. He was an assistant and then associate professor in the Concordia Institute for Information Systems Engineering at Concordia University from 2007 to 2013.

Fung joined the McGill University School of Information Studies as an associate professor in 2013, was appointed a Canada Research Chair in Data Mining for Cybersecurity in 2015, and was promoted to full professor in 2020. He held the Canada Research Chair until 2025. He is a senior member of the Association for Computing Machinery (ACM) and the Institute of Electrical and Electronics Engineers (IEEE).

He is editor-in-chief of the Elsevier journal Sustainable Cities and Society: Advances, and an associate editor of ACM Transactions on Knowledge Discovery from Data and of Sustainable Cities and Society. He was previously an associate editor of IEEE Transactions on Knowledge and Data Engineering and a co-curator of cybersecurity at the World Economic Forum.

== Research ==
Fung's interdisciplinary research spans data mining, machine learning, data privacy, building engineering and smart cities. His Data Mining and Security Lab (DMaS) developed a set of privacy-preserving data publishing methods for sharing person-specific data without compromising individual privacy while retaining the data's usefulness for data mining and machine learning. With support from Defence Research and Development Canada (DRDC), his team, including Steven Ding, developed an assembly code mining system called Kam1n0 for identifying patterns and code clones in software and malware binaries. Kam1n0 placed in the Hall of Fame of the Hex-Rays Plug-In Contest in 2015.

His research has been funded in part by the Natural Sciences and Engineering Research Council (NSERC), the Social Sciences and Humanities Research Council (SSHRC), DRDC and the Fonds de recherche du Québec – Nature et technologies (FRQNT).
