= PlanetPhysics =

- Website type: physics content, mathematical physics, Internet encyclopedia, Books, preprints and research articles
- Available in: English
- Owner: PlanetPhysics.org
- Creators: Aaron Krowne; Ben Loftin; Raymond Puzio
- Revenue: non-profit
- Website: planetphysics.org
- Commercial: No
- Registration: required to edit
- Launched: 2005
- Current status: Dead

PlanetPhysics was a virtual community with several Internet sites supported by a non-profit organization registered in the USA in an open science, open data, peer-to-peer review mode that aimed to help make physics, and related mathematics, knowledge much more accessible, as well as to further develop physical, logical, computational and mathematical physics concepts.

PlanetPhysics was also a free, collaborative, online physics, mathematical physics, computational physics and physical mathematics project, including original articles, lectures, books and encyclopedia entries. The emphasis was on openness, pedagogy, real-time content, rigour, interlinked content, and also based on a virtual community, or virtual group, of about 600 people with various physics, mathematical physics, physical mathematics, logic (such as quantum logic, relational logic and many-valued logics), axiomatics and mathematics interests.

Wikiversity hosts an archive of this project at PlanetPhysics

== Content ==
The main PlanetPhysics.org focus was on both original research and encyclopedic entries; with over 3,400 physics and mathematics concepts edited in LaTeX and rendered in HTML, the PlanetPhysics Encyclopedia is at present the largest Physics encyclopedia written in LaTeX, containing both introductory as well as advanced level presentations.

In addition, the PlanetPhysics.org new websites also included extensive graphics illustrations of physics experiments, and also forum discussions. The emphasis was on modern physics contents, including advanced physics and mathematical physics concepts as well.

The project hosted data containing physics, applied physics, engineering and mathematics books, lectures, preprints and research-level papers. A system for both private and semi-private messaging among users was also in place.

As of 15 May 2012, the Physics and Mathematical Physics projects hosted over 2,000 entries, containing more than 30,000 concepts in books, lectures, expositions, encyclopedia entries, and papers. Several Wikipedia entries also incorporate text from PlanetPhysics articles, and vice versa, several PlanetPhysics articles contain links or refer to Wikipedia entries.

=== Content development models ===
PlanetPhysics implemented several specific content creation systems based on the Noosphere versions 1.0/1.5, Planetary (powered by Drupal), and MediaWiki currently being updated to allow peer-to-peer review, as well as preprints and encyclopedic contributions. This was significantly different from the so-called authority model previously adopted by PlanetMath. Only registered users could create and edit their own entries, or contribute jointly, by agreement, to various topical entries. The MediaWiki version 1.17 approach was mostly utilized at PlanetPhysics for creating books, uploading PDF files of open access articles, and also for graphics-intensive physics animations and graphical applications to physical problems.

An author who published a new article with Noosphere version 1.5 (created by Aaron Krowne) retains intellectual property ownership of that entry, and is the only person authorized to edit that article, unless the author allows other contributors to edit as part of an editor group selected by the author. Other users could, however, add corrections and discuss improvements that must be approved by the original author so that the resulting modifications of the article, if any, were always made by the owner. When there are long lasting (>30 days) unresolved necessary corrections, either the ownership or the entry could be removed by the web site administration.

A major strength of the Noosphere versions 1.0 and 1.5 planetphysics.us website is its capability of linking in real time conceptually related entries, as well as automatically listing all the concepts either defined by the article or related to the article in the Physics and Mathematical Physics encyclopedia. Any PlanetPhysics contributor can explicitly create links to other articles, and the Noosphere 1.0 system also automatically turns certain words into links to the defining articles. The topic area of every article is classified by either the Physics and Astronomy Classification Scheme (PACS) or the Mathematics Subject Classification (MSC).

== See also ==
- PlanetMath
- Open science
- planetphysics.Co.uk
