= Karyn Moffat =

Canadian computer scientist

Karyn Moffatt is a Canadian computer scientist working in human–computer interaction. She is an associate professor in the School of Information Studies at McGill University, where she holds the Canada Research Chair in Inclusive Social Computing. Her research has included work on persuasive technology and computer accessibility.

Moffatt was an undergraduate at the University of British Columbia, and completed her Ph.D. at the same university in 2010. Her dissertation, Addressing Age-Related Pen-Based Target Acquisition Difficulties, was supervised by Joanna McGrenere.
