= McGill University Life Sciences Research Complex =

Canadian research partnership

The McGill University Life Sciences Research Complex (MULSRC) or simply the McGill Life Sciences Complex is a collaborative effort between McGill's Faculty of Science, Faculty of Medicine and Health Sciences and the McGill University Health Centre to create a multi-disciplinary research environment for investigators in the life sciences. The complex brings scientists together to work on research projects within five thematic biomedical fields:

- Cancer
- Genetics of complex traits
- Chemical biology
- Developmental and reproductive biology
- Cell information systems

== Buildings ==
The Life Sciences Complex is located within three interconnected buildings on the McGill campus in downtown Montreal:

- McIntyre Medical Sciences Building, 3655 Promenade Sir William Osler
- Stewart Biological Sciences Building, 1205 Dr Penfield Avenue
- Bellini Building and Cancer Pavilion

Together, the complex provides over 300,000 sq ft (28,000 m^{2}) for offices, classrooms and laboratories.

Stewart Biology Building underwent extensive renovations starting in 2017 in order to modernize its facilities.
