= CRC Standard Mathematical Tables =

Handbook of mathematics and table of formulas

- Book cover of the 33rd edition of CRC Standard Mathematical Tables and Formulas
- Editor: Daniel Zwillinger (30th–33rd editions)
- Language: English
- Genre: Mathematics
- Publisher: CRC Press
- Publication date: 1928 (1st ed.)–2018 (33rd ed.)
- Publication place: United States
- ISBN: 9781498777803 (33rd ed.)
- Website: www.mathtable.com/smtf/

CRC Standard Mathematical Tables (also CRC Standard Mathematical Tables and Formulas or SMTF) is a comprehensive one-volume handbook containing a fundamental working knowledge of mathematics and tables of formulas.

== History ==
The handbook was originally published in 1928 by the Chemical Rubber Company (now CRC Press) as a supplement (Mathematical Tables) to the CRC Handbook of Chemistry and Physics.

Beginning with the 10th edition (1956), it was published as CRC Standard Mathematical Tables and kept this title up to the 29th edition (1991). The 30th edition (1996) was renamed CRC Standard Mathematical Tables and Formulae, with Daniel Ian Zwillinger as the editor-in-chief. The 33rd edition (2018) was renamed CRC Standard Mathematical Tables and Formulas.

== Editions ==
The first edition was published in 1928. Subsequent editions are:

- Mathematical Tables from Handbook of Chemistry and Physics
  - 3rd edition (1933)
  - 4th edition (1934)
  - 5th edition (1936)
  - 6th edition (1938)
  - 7th edition (1941)
  - 8th edition (1946, 1947)
  - 9th edition (1952)
- CRC Standard Mathematical Tables
  - 10th edition (1956)
  - 11th edition (1957)
  - 12th edition (1959, 1964)
  - 13th edition (1964)
  - 14th edition (1965)
  - 15th edition (1967)
  - 16th edition (1968)
  - 17th edition (1969)
  - 18th edition (1970)
  - 19th edition (1971)
  - 20th edition (1972)
  - 21st edition (1973)
  - 22nd edition (1974)
  - 23rd edition (1975)
  - 24th edition (1976)
  - 25th edition (1979)
  - 26th edition (1981)
  - 27th edition (1985)
  - 28th edition (1990)
  - 29th edition (1991)
- CRC Standard Mathematical Tables and Formulae (Daniel Zwillinger, ed.)
  - 30th edition (1996)
  - 31st edition (2003)
  - 32nd edition (2011)
- CRC Standard Mathematical Tables and Formulas (Daniel Zwillinger, ed.)
  - 33rd edition (2018)

== Editors ==
Editors-in-chief:

- Charles D. Hodgman (14th edition and earlier)
- Samuel M. Selby (15th–23rd editions)
- William H. Beyer (24th–29th editions)
- Daniel Zwillinger (30th–33rd editions)

== See also ==
- List of important publications in mathematics
- Bronshtein and Semendyayev (BS)
- Korn (KK)
- Abramowitz and Stegun (AS)
- Gradshteyn and Ryzhik (GR)
- CRC Concise Encyclopedia of Mathematics
- CRC Handbook of Chemistry and Physics
