= Joachim Lambek =

Canadian mathematician (1922–2014)

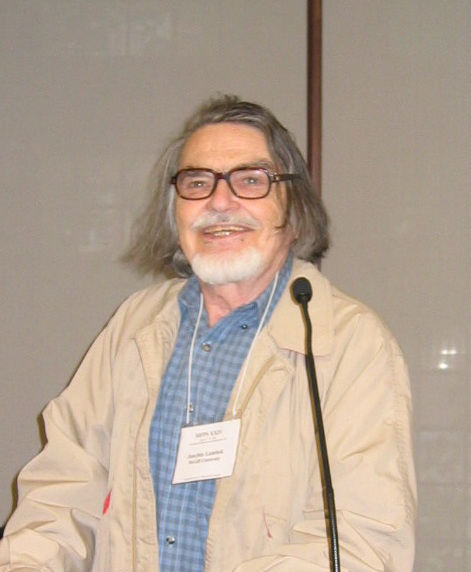
- Joachim Lambek in Philadelphia, May 2008
- Born: December 5, 1922; Leipzig, Germany
- Died: June 23, 2014 (aged 91); Montréal
- Citizenship: Canadian
- Education: McGill University
- Known for: Lambek–Moser theorem Lambek calculus Curry–Howard–Lambek correspondence multicategories
- Awards: Jeffery–Williams Prize (1988)
- Scientific career
- Fields: Mathematics
- Workplaces: Department of Mathematics and Statistics; McGill University
- Thesis: A: Biquaternion Vectorfields over Minkowski's Space B: The Immersibility of a Semigroup into a Group (1950)
- Doctoral advisor: Hans Zassenhaus
- Doctoral students: Israel Kleiner (1967); William Schelter (1972)

Joachim "Jim" Lambek FRSC (5 December 1922 – 23 June 2014) was a Canadian mathematician. He was Peter Redpath Emeritus Professor of Pure Mathematics at McGill University, where he earned his PhD degree in 1950 with Hans Zassenhaus as advisor.

== Biography ==
Lambek was born in Leipzig, Germany, where he attended a Gymnasium. He came to England in 1938 as a refugee on the Kindertransport. From there he was interned as an enemy alien and deported to a prison work camp in New Brunswick, Canada. There, he began in his spare time a mathematical apprenticeship with Fritz Rothberger, also interned, and wrote the McGill Junior Matriculation in fall of 1941. In the spring of 1942, he was released and settled in Montreal, where he entered studies at McGill University, graduating with an honours mathematics degree in 1945 and an MSc a year later. In 1950, he completed his doctorate under Hans Zassenhaus becoming McGill's first PhD in mathematics.

Lambek became assistant professor at McGill; he was made a full professor in 1963. He spent his sabbatical year 1965–66 in at the Institute for Mathematical Research at ETH Zurich, where Beno Eckmann had gathered together a group of researchers interested in algebraic topology and category theory, including Bill Lawvere. There Lambek reoriented his research into category theory.

Lambek retired in 1992 but continued his involvement at McGill's mathematics department. In 2000 a festschrift celebrating Lambek's contributions to mathematical structures in computer science was published. On the occasion of Lambek's 90th birthday, a collection Categories and Types in Logic, Language, and Physics was produced in tribute to him.

== Scholarly work ==
Lambek's wrote two short PhD theses on separate topics: one studying quaternions in the foundations of mathematical physics (specifically the biquaternion algebra containing Minkowski space), and another on the problem of embedding a semigroup into a group. The second component, attacking a question that had been previously addressed by Anatoly Maltsev but using a novel geometric approach, was published by the Canadian Journal of Mathematics. He later returned to biquaternions when in 1995 he contributed "If Hamilton had prevailed: Quaternions in Physics", which exhibited the Riemann–Silberstein bivector to express the free-space electromagnetic equations.

Lambek supervised 17 doctoral students, and has 99 doctoral descendants as of 2025. He has over 100 publications listed in the Mathematical Reviews, including 6 books. His earlier work was mostly in module theory, especially torsion theories, non-commutative localization, and injective modules. One of his earliest papers, Lambek & Moser (1954), proved the Lambek–Moser theorem about integer sequences. In 1963 he published an important result, now known as Lambek's theorem, on character modules characterizing flatness of a module. His more recent work is in pregroups and formal languages; his earliest works in this field were probably Lambek (1958) and Lambek (1979). He is noted, among other things, for the Lambek calculus, an influential effort to capture mathematical aspects of natural language syntax in logical form by reducing grammaticality to a test of logical entailment in a certain sequent calculus, as well as for developing the connections between typed lambda calculus and cartesian closed categories (see Curry–Howard–Lambek correspondence). His last works were on pregroup grammar.

== Selected works ==
=== Books ===
- Lambek, Joachim (2009) [1966]. Lectures on rings and modules (3rd ed.). Blaisdell Publishing. ISBN 9780821849002. MR 0206032.
- Fine, N. J.; Gillman, Leonard; — (1966). Rings of quotients of rings of functions. McGill University Press. MR 0200747.
- — (1966). Completions of categories. Seminar lectures given in 1966 in Zürich. Lecture Notes in Mathematics, No. 24. Berlin, New York: Springer-Verlag. MR 0209330.
- — (1971). Torsion theories, additive semantics, and rings of quotients. Lecture Notes in Mathematics. Vol. 177. Berlin, New York: Springer-Verlag. MR 0284459.
- —; Scott, P. J. (1986). Introduction to Higher Order Categorical Logic. Cambridge University Press. ISBN 978-0-521-35653-4. MR 0856915.
- Anglin, W. S.; — (1995). The heritage of Thales. Undergraduate Texts in Mathematics. Berlin, New York: Springer-Verlag. ISBN 978-0-387-94544-6. MR 1369087.
- Casadio, Claudia; — (2008). Computational Algebraic Approaches to Natural Language. Polimetrica. ISBN 978-88-7699-125-7.
- — (2008). From word to sentence: a computational algebraic approach to grammar. Polimetrica. ISBN 978-88-7699-117-2.

=== Articles ===
- Lambek, Joachim (1951), "The immersibility of a semigroup into a group", Canadian Journal of Mathematics, 3: 34–43, doi:10.4153/CJM-1951-005-8, S2CID 124979541
- —; Moser, L. (1954), "Inverse and Complementary Sequences of Natural Numbers", The American Mathematical Monthly, 61 (7): 454–458, doi:10.2307/2308078, ISSN 0002-9890, JSTOR 2308078, MR 0062777
- — (1958), "The Mathematics of Sentence Structure" (PDF), The American Mathematical Monthly, 65 (3): 154–170, doi:10.2307/2310058, ISSN 0002-9890, JSTOR 1480361
- — (1961), "How to program an infinite abacus", Canadian Mathematical Bulletin, 4 (3): 295–302, doi:10.4153/CMB-1961-032-6, S2CID 121506469
- — (1969). "Deductive systems and categories II. Standard constructions and closed categories". Lecture Notes in Mathematics. Vol. 86. Berlin, Heidelberg: Springer Berlin Heidelberg. pp. 76–122. doi:10.1007/bfb0079385. ISBN 978-3-540-04605-9. ISSN 0075-8434.
- — (1972), "Bicommutators of nice injectives", Journal of Algebra, 21: 60–73, doi:10.1016/0021-8693(72)90034-8, ISSN 0021-8693, MR 0301052
- — (1972), "Localization and completion" (PDF), Journal of Pure and Applied Algebra, 2 (4): 343–370, doi:10.1016/0022-4049(72)90011-4, ISSN 0022-4049, MR 0320047
- — (1979), "A mathematician looks at Latin conjugation", Theoretical Linguistics, 6 (2): 221–234, doi:10.1515/thli.1979.6.1-3.221, ISSN 0301-4428, MR 0589163, S2CID 62697835
- — (1995). "If Hamilton had prevailed: Quaternions and Physics". Mathematical Intelligencer. 17 (4): 7–15. doi:10.1007/BF03024783. S2CID 120099630. Reprinted in Wilson, Robin; Gray, Jeremy, eds. (2001). Mathematical Conversations. Springer-Verlag. ISBN 978-1-4613-0195-0.
- —; Barr, Michael (2013), In Praise of Quaternions (PDF), McGill University

=== Memorial volume ===
- Casadio, Claudia; Scott, Philip J. (2021). Joachim Lambek: The Interplay of Mathematics, Logic, and Linguistics. Springer. ISBN 978-3-030-66545-6.

== See also ==
- Cartesian monoid
- Michael K. Brame
