= Cartesian monoid =

A Cartesian monoid is a monoid, with additional structure of pairing and projection operators. It was first formulated by Dana Scott and Joachim Lambek independently.

== Definition ==
A Cartesian monoid is a structure with signature $\langle *,e,(-,-),L,R\rangle$ where $*$ and $(-,-)$ are binary operations, $L, R$, and $e$ are constants satisfying the following axioms for all $x,y,z$ in its universe:

Monoid
$*$ is a monoid with identity $e$
Left Projection
$$L * (x,\,y) = x$$
Right Projection
$$R * (x,\,y) = y$$
Surjective Pairing
$$(L*x,\,R*x) = x$$
Right Homogeneity
$$(x*z,\,y*z)=(x,\,y) * z$$

The interpretation is that $L$ and $R$ are left and right projection functions respectively for the pairing function $(-,-)$.
