= McGill Faculty of Science =

Faculty of McGill University

- Type: Public
- Established: 1971; 55 years ago
- Parent institution: McGill University
- Dean: Bruce Lennox
- Vice Dean: David Stephens
- Location: Montreal, Quebec, Canada
- Campus: Urban
- Website: mcgill.ca/science

The McGill Faculty of Science is one of eleven faculties at McGill University in Montreal, Quebec, Canada. With roots tracing back to 1843, the Faculty currently offers several undergraduate and graduate programs ranging from Earth Sciences to Mathematics to Neuroscience.

The Faculty of Science offers approximately 200 scholarships each year for its undergraduate students. Most of these prizes are based on academic excellence. Graduate students are also eligible for a variety of science fellowships.

The Faculty of Science provides its students with opportunities to complete research. Students enrolled in the Faculty of Science can also access the Research and Innovation Office, which aims to promote interdisciplinary and entrepreneurial scientific research.

== History ==
The Faculty of Science’s foundation can be traced back to the founding of McGill in 1843. It was informally part of the Faculty of Art, as both “Classical and Mathematical Training” were provided. McGill’s principal from 1855 to 1893, William Dawson, unified fragmented colleges into a complete education and research complex, with an emphasis on science education. With donations from scientists, chairs in multiple scientific disciplines were established at the beginning of the 1870s. The Chemistry Lab, Botany Chair, and College of Agriculture were created in the 1880s.

In the 1890s and 1900s, the physics and mathematics departments were split into two separate departments. Ernest Rutherford and Frederick Soddy, among other scientists, produced major scientific research and breakthroughs which won Nobel Prizes.

During World War I, the science departments studied explosives and found new ways to produce magnesium and cadmium as a part of the war effort in Canada.

After the war, new buildings such as the Biology building and the Pulp and Paper Building were built to accommodate the expansion and specialization of departments.

Similarly, between 1930 and 1970, new research stations were established, including an Arctic station and stations in South America.

After World War II, the Faculty kept expanding, with the construction of the Radiation Laboratory, Physical Sciences Centre (now Frank Dawson Adams), McIntyre-Stewart Complex of Biology, Otto Mass Chemistry, Burnside Side (Math, Geography, Atmospheric, and Oceanic Sciences) were built due to lack of spaces.

In 1971, the current Faculty of Science was officially founded. There was no change of departments, except for the School of Computer Science, which joined the Faculty in 1997.

== Administration ==
On July 1, 2015, Bruce Lennox began his term as the Faculty’s Dean of Science. Lennox was re-appointed for a second term in 2019. As Dean of Science, Lennox works alongside a Vice-Dean and four Associate Deans. Each Associate Dean is responsible for a specific administrative area, including Academics, Student Affairs, Graduate Education and Research.

== Departments and Schools ==
- Department of Anatomy and Cell Biology
- Department of Atmospheric and Oceanic Sciences
- Department of Biochemistry
- Department of Biology
- Department of Chemistry
- School of Computer Science
- Department of Earth and Planetary Sciences
- Department of Environment
- Department of Geography
- Department of Mathematics and Statistics
- Department of Microbiology and Immunology
- Department of Pharmacology
- Department of Physics
- Department of Physiology
- Department of Psychology

== Medicine Preparatory Program ==
Students enrolled in McGill University's Medicine Preparatory Program are not part of the Faculty of Medicine. They are members of the Faculty of Science for the duration of their "Med-P" year. Upon successful completion of the year-long medical preparatory program, students are transferred to the Faculty of Medicine as "Med-1" students. This transfer between faculties is unique to McGill University. Medical students at Université de Montréal are part of the Faculté de médecine de l'Université de Montréal from their preparatory year until their final year of medical school.

== Undergraduate studies ==
The Faculty offers various undergraduate programs within four notable program groups:

- Biological, Biomedical and Life Sciences Group (Liberal, Major and Honours Programs)
- Bio-Physical-Computational Sciences Group (Major and Honours Programs)
- Neuroscience Group (Major and Honours Programs)
- Physical, Earth, Math and Computer Science Group (Liberal, Major, Honours, Joint Major, and Joint Honours Programs)

In total, 88 Bachelor of Science (B.Sc) programs are offered to undergraduate students, with topics of studies ranging from Environment, Biochemistry and Geology, to Software Engineering and Psychology.

B.Sc undergraduate students can also choose from 34 Minor programs, ranging from Human Nutrition to Musical Science and Technology.

== Graduate studies ==
The Faculty of Science also offers a variety of graduate programs, with the option to pursue a Master of Science (M.Sc) or a PhD at the university. Programs can be found for every department and discipline of the Faculty of Science, with focused research topics ranging from Sea Ice Dynamics to Astrophysics.

== Bachelors of Arts & Science (B.A. & Sc.) ==
The Bachelor of Arts and Science was introduced to McGill University in 2005. Encompassing both disciplines in one degree, programs in the B.A & Sc. offer courses in both faculties and fields, and brings together two of McGill’s biggest faculties.

== Student body ==
The Faculty counts with 6282 students in the Bachelor of Science, and 706 students between the interfaculty BA & BSc (2021).

== Notable alumni ==
=== Nobel Prize winners ===
Willard Boyle received the 2009 Nobel Prize in Physics thanks to his contributions to the invention of the charge-coupled device (CCD), an integrated circuit containing an array of linked capacitors. He gained a BSc in 1947, an MSc in 1948, and a Ph.D. degree in 1950, all from McGill University.

Rudolph Marcus received the 1992 Nobel Prize in Chemistry for his theory of electron transfer. He received a BSc for the class of 1943, and a Ph.D. in 1946 from McGill University.

=== Astronauts ===
Julie Payette, BEng'86, DSc’03, boarded the International Space Station in the STS-96 and STS-127 missions. She was in space for 25 days and was the second Canadian woman to do so. She also was the astronaut leader in the Canadian Space Agency from 2000 to 2007.

David Saint-Jacques launched to the International Space Station in a six-month mission on Expeditions 57, 58, and 59 in 2018.

=== Other ===
Thomas Chang invented the first artificial blood cell in his dorm room in 1957, while still an undergraduate at McGill. He later completes his studies at McGill University with a B.Sc. (1957), M.D. (1961), and a Ph.D. (1965).

Yoshua Bengio, BEng’86, MSc’88, PhD’91, has recognized work in the field of deep learning and artificial neural webworks. He was co-recipient of the A.M Turing Award in 2018, along with Geoffrey Hinton and Yann LeCun.

Leo Yaffe, worked at the Manhattan Project's Montreal Laboratory

P. R. Wallace, worked at the Manhattan Project's Montreal Laboratory

=== Current and former faculty ===
Robert Myers (physicist)

== See also ==
- McGill University Life Sciences Research Complex
