= Eric W. Weisstein =

American mathematician and encyclopedist (born 1969)

- Born: March 18, 1969 (age 57); Bloomington, Indiana, US
- Education: Cornell University (BA); California Institute of Technology (MS, PhD)
- Known for: MathWorld, CRC Concise Encyclopedia of Mathematics, ScienceWorld
- Scientific career
- Fields: Planetary astronomy, physics, mathematics
- Workplaces: Wolfram Research
- Doctoral advisor: Dewey Muhleman

Eric Wolfgang Weisstein (born March 18, 1969) is an American scientist, mathematician, and encyclopedist who created and maintains the encyclopedias MathWorld and ScienceWorld. In addition, he is the author of the CRC Concise Encyclopedia of Mathematics. He works for Wolfram Research.

== Education ==
Weisstein holds a Ph.D. in planetary astronomy, which he obtained from the California Institute of Technology's Division of Geological and Planetary Sciences in 1996 as well as an M.S. in planetary astronomy in 1993 also from Caltech. Weisstein graduated cum laude from Cornell University with a B.A. in physics and a minor in astronomy in 1990. During his summers away from Cornell, Weisstein participated in research at the Arecibo Observatory, a radio telescope facility in Puerto Rico operated by Cornell. As a graduate student, Weisstein also participated in research at Goddard Space Flight Center in Greenbelt, Maryland. During his time at Goddard, Weisstein participated in the development of hurricane visualization software. In 1996 Weisstein published his doctoral thesis titled Millimeter/Submillimeter Fourier Transform Spectroscopy of Jovian Planet Atmospheres, which was completed under faculty advisor Dewey Muhleman and in association with Eugene Serabyn, who later became a member of the Caltech Jet Propulsion Laboratory.

== Career ==
=== Academic research ===
Upon completion of his doctorate, Weisstein became a research scientist at Caltech in January 1996 and continued work in the field of submillimeter spectroscopy. He collaborated with Eugene Serabyn and published several papers. Six months later, he moved to the University of Virginia's Department of Astronomy in Charlottesville where he remained for three years to continue his research.

=== MathWorld, ScienceWorld, and Wolfram Research ===
In 1995, Weisstein converted a Microsoft Word document of over 200 pages to hypertext format and uploaded it to his webspace at Caltech under the title Eric's Treasure Trove of Sciences. After Weisstein transferred to the University of Virginia to continue his work in astronomy, he continued to refine his fledgling encyclopedia. In November 1998, Weisstein made a deal with the CRC Press to publish his encyclopedia in book format as the CRC Concise Encyclopedia of Mathematics. A year later, in 1999, Weisstein accepted the position of encyclopedist at Wolfram Research, Inc. (WRI). MathWorld was ready to be unveiled in December 1999 with nearly 13,000 entries, most of them written by Weisstein, encompassing a variety of disciplines, including algebra, geometry, calculus, discrete mathematics, topology, number theory, statistics, and the foundations.

MathWorld became involved in a legal dispute with the CRC Press in March 2000. The CRC Press claimed MathWorld violated the copyright on the CRC Concise Encyclopedia of Mathematics. During the dispute, a court order shut down MathWorld for over a year starting October 23, 2000. According to Eric Weisstein's personal site, he restarted MathWorld on November 6, 2001. This ultimately led to the creation of PlanetMath. Wolfram Research, Stephen Wolfram, and Eric Weisstein settled with the CRC Press for an undisclosed financial award and several benefits. Among these benefits are the inclusion of a copyright notice of the CRC Press at the bottom of all webpages in MathWorld and legal rights to reproduce MathWorld in a book format again.

ScienceWorld, also known as Eric Weisstein's World of Science, was unveiled to the general public in January 2002. ScienceWorld includes more than 1,000 entries in many fields of science including astronomy, chemistry, physics and biographies of scientists.

=== Further scientific activities ===
In 2014, he became a member of the Global Digital Mathematics Library Working Group of the International Mathematical Union.
