= Stephen Drury (mathematician) =

Anglo-Canadian mathematician

Stephen William Drury is an Anglo-Canadian mathematician and professor of mathematics at McGill University. He specializes in mathematical analysis, harmonic analysis and linear algebra. He received his doctorate from the University of Cambridge in 1970 under the supervision of Nicholas Varopoulos and completed his postdoctoral training at the Faculté des sciences d'Orsay, France. He was recruited to McGill by Professor Carl Herz in 1972.

Among other contributions, he solved the Sidon set union problem, worked on restrictions of Fourier and Radon transforms to curves, and generalized von Neumann's inequality. In operator theory, the Drury–Arveson space is named after William Arveson and him.

His research now pertains to the interplay between matrix theory and harmonic analysis and their applications to graph theory.
