= Zassenhaus algorithm =

Mathematic algorithm for basis

In mathematics, the Zassenhaus algorithm is a method to calculate a basis for the intersection and sum of two subspaces of a vector space. It is named after Hans Zassenhaus, but no publication of this algorithm by him is known. It is used in computer algebra systems.

== Algorithm ==
=== Input ===
Let V be a vector space and U, W two finite-dimensional subspaces of V with the following spanning sets:

$$U = \langle u_1, \ldots, u_n\rangle$$

and

$$W = \langle w_1, \ldots, w_k\rangle.$$

Finally, let $B_1, \ldots, B_m$ be linearly independent vectors so that $u_i$ and $w_i$ can be written as

$$u_i = \sum_{j=1}^m a_{i,j}B_j$$

and

$$w_i = \sum_{j=1}^m b_{i,j}B_j.$$

=== Output ===
The algorithm computes the base of the sum $U + W$ and a base of the intersection $U \cap W$.

=== Algorithm ===
The algorithm creates the following block matrix of size $((n+k) \times (2m))$:

$$\begin{pmatrix}
a_{1,1}&a_{1,2}&\cdots&a_{1,m}&a_{1,1}&a_{1,2}&\cdots&a_{1,m}\\
\vdots&\vdots&&\vdots&\vdots&\vdots&&\vdots\\
a_{n,1}&a_{n,2}&\cdots&a_{n,m}&a_{n,1}&a_{n,2}&\cdots&a_{n,m}\\
b_{1,1}&b_{1,2}&\cdots&b_{1,m}&0&0&\cdots&0\\
\vdots&\vdots&&\vdots&\vdots&\vdots&&\vdots\\
b_{k,1}&b_{k,2}&\cdots&b_{k,m}&0&0&\cdots&0
\end{pmatrix}$$

Using elementary row operations, this matrix is transformed to the row echelon form. Then, it has the following shape:

$$\begin{pmatrix}
c_{1,1}&c_{1,2}&\cdots&c_{1,m}&\bullet&\bullet&\cdots&\bullet\\
\vdots&\vdots&&\vdots&\vdots&\vdots&&\vdots\\
c_{q,1}&c_{q,2}&\cdots&c_{q,m}&\bullet&\bullet&\cdots&\bullet\\
0&0&\cdots&0&d_{1,1}&d_{1,2}&\cdots&d_{1,m}\\
\vdots&\vdots&&\vdots&\vdots&\vdots&&\vdots\\
0&0&\cdots&0&d_{\ell,1}&d_{\ell,2}&\cdots&d_{\ell,m}\\
0&0&\cdots&0&0&0&\cdots&0\\
\vdots&\vdots&&\vdots&\vdots&\vdots&&\vdots\\
0&0&\cdots&0&0&0&\cdots&0
\end{pmatrix}$$

Here, $\bullet$ stands for arbitrary numbers, and the vectors $(c_{p,1}, c_{p,2}, \ldots, c_{p,m})$ for every $p \in \{1, \ldots, q\}$ and $(d_{p,1}, \ldots, d_{p,m})$ for every $p\in \{1, \ldots, \ell\}$ are nonzero.

Then $(y_1, \ldots, y_q)$ with

$$y_i := \sum_{j=1}^m c_{i,j}B_j$$

is a basis of $U+W$ and $(z_1, \ldots, z_\ell)$ with

$$z_i := \sum_{j=1}^m d_{i,j}B_j$$

is a basis of $U \cap W$.

=== Proof of correctness ===
First, we define $\pi_1 : V \times V \to V, (a, b) \mapsto a$ to be the projection to the first component.

Let $H:=\{(u,u) \mid u\in U\}+\{(w,0) \mid w\in W\} \subseteq V\times V.$ Then $\pi_1(H) = U+W$ and $H\cap(0\times V)=0\times(U\cap W)$.

Also, $H \cap (0 \times V)$ is the kernel of ${\pi_1|}_H$, the projection restricted to H. Therefore, $\dim(H) = \dim(U+W)+\dim(U\cap W)$.

The Zassenhaus algorithm calculates a basis of H. In the first m columns of this matrix, there is a basis $y_i$ of $U+W$.

The rows of the form $(0, z_i)$ (with $z_i \neq 0$) are obviously in $H \cap (0 \times V)$. Because the matrix is in row echelon form, they are also linearly independent. All rows which are different from zero ($(y_i, \bullet)$ and $(0, z_i)$) are a basis of H, so there are $\dim(U \cap W)$ such $z_i$s. Therefore, the $z_i$s form a basis of $U \cap W$.

== Example ==
Consider the two subspaces $U = \left\langle \left( \begin{array}{r} 1\\ -1 \\ 0 \\ 1 \end{array} \right), \left( \begin{array}{r} 0 \\ 0 \\ 1 \\ -1 \end{array} \right) \right\rangle$ and $W = \left\langle \left( \begin{array}{r} 5 \\ 0 \\ -3 \\ 3 \end{array} \right), \left( \begin{array}{r} 0 \\ 5 \\ -3 \\ -2 \end{array} \right) \right\rangle$ of the vector space $\mathbb{R}^4$.

Using the standard basis, we create the following matrix of dimension $(2 + 2) \times (2 \cdot 4)$:

$$\left( \begin{array}{rrrrrrrr} 1 & -1 & 0 & 1 & & 1 & -1 & 0 & 1 \\
0&0&1&-1& &0&0&1&-1 \\ \\
5&0&-3&3& &0&0&0&0 \\
0&5&-3&-2& &0&0&0&0 \end{array} \right).$$

Using elementary row operations, we transform this matrix into the following matrix:

$\left( \begin{array}{rrrrrrrrr} 1 & 0 & 0 & 0 & & \bullet & \bullet & \bullet & \bullet \\ 0&1&0&-1& &\bullet&\bullet&\bullet&\bullet\\ 0&0&1&-1& &\bullet&\bullet&\bullet&\bullet\\ \\ 0&0&0&0& &1&-1&0&1 \end{array} \right)$ (Some entries have been replaced by "$\bullet$" because they are irrelevant to the result.)

Therefore $\left( \left(\begin{array}{r} 1\\0\\0\\0\end{array} \right), \left( \begin{array}{r} 0\\1\\0\\-1\end{array} \right), \left( \begin{array}{r} 0\\0\\1\\-1\end{array}\right) \right)$ is a basis of $U+W$, and $\left( \left(\begin{array}{r} 1\\-1\\0\\1\end{array}\right) \right)$ is a basis of $U \cap W$.

== See also ==
- Gröbner basis
