= Random.org =

Random number generator based on atmospheric noise

- Random.org as of October, 2009
- Website type: Web service
- Available in: English
- Owner: Mads Haahr
- Creator: Mads Haahr
- Website: www.random.org
- Registration: optional
- Launched: 1998
- Current status: online

Random.org (stylized as RANDOM.ORG) is a website that produces random numbers based on atmospheric noise. In addition to generating random numbers in a specified range and subject to a specified probability distribution, which are the most commonly activities on the site, it has free tools to simulate events such as flipping coins, shuffling cards, and rolling dice. It also offers paid services to generate longer sequences of random numbers and act as a third-party arbiter for raffles, sweepstakes, and promotions. Random.org is distinguished from pseudo-random number generators, which use mathematical formulae to produce random-appearing numbers.

The website was created in 1998 by Mads Haahr, a computer science professor at Trinity College in Dublin, Ireland. Random numbers are generated based on atmospheric noise captured by several radios tuned between stations.

== Bits ==
A binary digit (bit) can be either 0 or 1. There are several Random.org radios located in Copenhagen, Dublin, and Ballsbridge, each generating 12,000 bits per second from the atmospheric noise picked up. The generators produce a continuous string of random bits which are converted into the form requested (integer, Gaussian distribution, etc.).

== Quota ==
There are limits to the number of bits supplied to a particular IP address. A new user (identified by IP address) starts with a free-of-charge quota of 1,000,000 bits which is depleted every time bits are supplied, and topped up by 200,000 bits (or to 1,000,000 bits if the user has more than 800,000 bits remaining) every day at midnight UTC. Larger numbers of bits can be purchased.
