= Group with operators =

Concept in mathematics regarding sets operating on groups

In abstract algebra, a branch of mathematics, a group with operators or Ω-group is an algebraic structure that can be viewed as a group together with a set Ω that operates on the elements of the group in a special way.

Groups with operators were extensively studied by Emmy Noether and her school in the 1920s. She employed the concept in her original formulation of the three Noether isomorphism theorems.

== Definition ==
A group with operators $(G, \Omega)$ can be defined as a group $G = (G, \cdot)$ together with an action of a set $\Omega$ on $G$:

$$\Omega \times G \rightarrow G : (\omega, g) \mapsto g^\omega$$

that is distributive relative to the group law:

$$(g \cdot h)^\omega = g^\omega \cdot h^\omega.$$

For each $\omega \in \Omega$, the map $g \mapsto g^\omega$ is then an endomorphism of G. From this, it results that a Ω-group can also be viewed as a group G with an indexed family $\left(u_\omega\right)_{\omega \in \Omega}$ of endomorphisms of G.

$\Omega$ is called the operator domain. The associate endomorphisms are called the homotheties of G.

Given two groups G, H with same operator domain $\Omega$, a homomorphism of groups with operators from $(G, \Omega)$ to $(H, \Omega)$ is a group homomorphism $\phi: G \to H$ satisfying

$\phi\left(g^\omega\right) = (\phi(g))^\omega$ for all $\omega \in \Omega$ and $g \in G.$

A subgroup S of G is called a stable subgroup, $\Omega$-subgroup or $\Omega$-invariant subgroup if it respects the homotheties, that is

$s^\omega \in S$ for all $s \in S$ and $\omega \in \Omega.$

== Category-theoretic remarks ==
In category theory, a group with operators can be defined as an object of a functor category Grp^{M} where M is a monoid (i.e. a category with one object) and Grp denotes the category of groups. This definition is equivalent to the previous one, provided $\Omega$ is a monoid (if not, we may expand it to include the identity and all compositions).

A morphism in this category is a natural transformation between two functors (i.e., two groups with operators sharing same operator domain M ). Again we recover the definition above of a homomorphism of groups with operators (with f the component of the natural transformation).

A group with operators is also a mapping

$$\Omega \rightarrow \operatorname{End}_\mathbf{Grp}(G),$$

where $\operatorname{End}_\mathbf{Grp}(G)$ is the set of group endomorphisms of G.

== Examples ==
- Given any group G, (G, ∅) is trivially a group with operators
- Given a module M over a ring R, R acts by scalar multiplication on the underlying abelian group of M, so (M, R) is a group with operators.
- As a special case of the above, every vector space over a field K is a group with operators (V, K).

== Applications ==
The Jordan–Hölder theorem also holds in the context of groups with operators. The requirement that a group have a composition series is analogous to that of compactness in topology, and can sometimes be too strong a requirement. It is natural to talk about "compactness relative to a set", i.e. talk about composition series where each (normal) subgroup is an operator-subgroup relative to the operator set X, of the group in question.

== See also ==
- Group action
