= Abhandlungen aus dem Mathematischen Seminar der Universität Hamburg =

Peer-reviewed mathematics journal published by Springer Science+Business Media

- Discipline: Pure mathematics
- Language: English
- Edited by: Vicente Cortés and Tobias Dyckerhoff

Publication details
- History: 1922–present
- Publisher: Springer Science+Business Media
- Frequency: Biannual
- Impact factor: 0.382 (2020)

Standard abbreviations
- ISO 4: Abh. Math. Semin. Univ. Hambg.

Indexing
- CODEN: AMHAAJ
- ISSN: 0025-5858 (print); 1865-8784 (web)
- LCCN: 32024459
- OCLC no.: 01913576

Links
- Official Springer webpage; Webpage at the Universität Hamburg

Abhandlungen aus dem Mathematischen Seminar der Universität Hamburg (English: Reports from the Mathematical Seminar of the University of Hamburg) is a peer-reviewed mathematics journal published by Springer Science+Business Media. It publishes articles on pure mathematics and is scientifically coordinated by the Mathematisches Seminar, an informal cooperation of mathematicians at the Universität Hamburg; its managing editors are professors Vicente Córtes and Tobias Dyckerhoff. The journal is indexed by Mathematical Reviews and Zentralblatt MATH.

== History ==
The Abhandlungen were set up as a new journal by Wilhelm Blaschke in 1922 at the newly created Department of Mathematics (called Mathematisches Seminar) at the newly founded Hamburgische Universität. Blaschke invited Hermann Weyl and David Hilbert to the Mathematisches Seminar (in 1920 and 1921, respectively) to deliver a talk series on their views concerning the Foundations of Mathematics. These talks formed part of the early history of the Grundlagenkrise der Mathematik, and Hilbert's talk was published in the first volume of the new journal. The first volumes of the journal contain numerous papers of famous mathematicians such as Paul Bernays, Constantin Carathéodory, G. H. Hardy & J. E. Littlewood, Jacques Herbrand, Ruth Moufang, George Pólya, and John von Neumann.

Until 1970, the Mathematisches Seminar was covering all of mathematics, including applied mathematics, stochastics, and statistics. After the reform of the university, it became the research institute of pure mathematics. As an institution, the Mathematisches Seminar was dissolved in 1999 and the informal cooperation with the same name was formed.

Since 2007, the journal is published by Springer Science+Business Media.

== List of managing editors ==
The professors of the Mathematisches Seminar of the Universität Hamburg are serving as member of the editorial board of the journal. Until volume 36, the editorial board consisted of the directors of the Mathematisches Seminar and there was no managing editor. In those years, the following Hamburg professors were members of the editorial board: Rainer Ansorge, Emil Artin, Heinz Bauer, Wilhelm Blaschke, Hel Braun, Lothar Collatz, Max Deuring, Helmut Hasse, Erich Hecke, Karl Hinderer, Erich Kähler, Hans Rademacher, Johann Radon, Leopold Schmetterer, Emanuel Sperner, Ernst Witt, and Hans Zassenhaus.

Starting with volume 37, a pair of managing editors (Schriftleitung) was responsible for the administration of the editorial process.

Years	Volumes	Managing editors (Schriftleitung)
1972–1974	37-40	Dieter Biallas, Emanuel Sperner
1974–1976	41-45	Walter Benz, Emanuel Sperner
1979–1981	48-51	Kurt Legrady, Oswald Riemenschneider
1982–1984	52-54	Helmut Strade, Oswald Riemenschneider
1985	55	Jens Carsten Jantzen, Helmut Strade
1986–1988	56-58	Rolf Berndt, Helmut Strade
1994–1999	64-69	Johannes Michalićek, Helmut Müller
2000	70	Alexander Kreuzer, Johannes Michalićek
2001–2003	71-73	Christian Bär, Alexander Kreuzer
2004–2005	74-75	Alexander Kreuzer, Oswald Riemenschneider
2006	76	Oswald Riemenschneider, Christoph Schweigert
2008–2021	78-91	Vicente Córtes, Birgit Richter
2008–2021	78-91	Vicente Córtes, Tobias Dyckerhoff
