= Brigitte Pientka =

German-Canadian computer scientist

Brigitte Pientka (born 1971) is a computer scientist whose research involves formal methods for software system safety, including type theory, automated reasoning, and the operational semantics of functional programming. Born in Germany and educated in Germany and the US, she works in Canada as a professor of computer science at McGill University, where she heads the Computation and Logic Group.

== Education and career ==
Pientka was born in 1971 in Coburg, Germany. She studied computer science at Technische Universität Darmstadt, earning a diplom (the German equivalent of a master's degree) in 1997. After visiting Cornell University as a Visiting Research Scholar, She went to Carnegie Mellon University for doctoral study in computer science. She completed her Ph.D. in 2003, with the dissertation Tabled Higher-Order Logic Programming supervised by Frank Pfenning.

She joined McGill University as an assistant professor of computer science in 2003, and is currently a full professor there.

== Recognition ==
A 2008 paper by Pientka and Jana Dunfield, "Programming with proofs and explicit contexts", won the 2018 Test of Time Award of the ACM SIGPLAN International Conference on Principles and Practice of Declarative Programming (PPDP).
