= Zassenhaus group =

In mathematics, a Zassenhaus group, named after Hans Zassenhaus, is a certain sort of doubly transitive permutation group very closely related to rank-1 groups of Lie type.

== Definition ==
A Zassenhaus group is a permutation group G on a finite set X with the following three properties:

- G is doubly transitive.
- Non-trivial elements of G fix at most two points.
- G has no regular normal subgroup. ("Regular" means that non-trivial elements do not fix any points of X; compare free action.)

The degree of a Zassenhaus group is the number of elements of X.

Some authors omit the third condition that G has no regular normal subgroup. This condition is put in to eliminate some "degenerate" cases. The extra examples one gets by omitting it are either Frobenius groups or certain groups of degree 2^{p} and order 2^{p}(2^{p} − 1)p for a prime p, that are generated by all semilinear mappings and Galois automorphisms of a field of order 2^{p}.

== Examples ==
We let q = p^{f} be a power of a prime p, and write F_{q} for the finite field of order q. Michio Suzuki proved that any Zassenhaus group is of one of the following four types:

- The projective special linear group PSL_{2}(F_{q}) for q > 3 odd, acting on the q + 1 points of the projective line. It has order (q + 1)q(q − 1)/2.
- The projective general linear group PGL_{2}(F_{q}) for q > 3. It has order (q + 1)q(q − 1).
- A certain group containing PSL_{2}(F_{q}) with index 2, for q an odd square. It has order (q + 1)q(q − 1).
- The Suzuki group Suz(F_{q}) for q a power of 2 that is at least 8 and not a square. The order is (q^{2} + 1)q^{2}(q − 1)

The degree of these groups is q + 1 in the first three cases, q^{2} + 1 in the last case.
