= MathWorld =

Online mathematics reference work

- Company type: Private
- Website type: Internet encyclopedia project
- Available in: English
- Owner: Wolfram Research, Inc.
- Creator: Eric W. Weisstein
- Website: mathworld.wolfram.com
- Launched: November 1999; 26 years ago
- Current status: Active

MathWorld is an online mathematics reference work, created and largely written by Eric W. Weisstein. It is sponsored by and licensed to Wolfram Research, Inc. and was partially funded by the National Science Foundation's National Science Digital Library grant to the University of Illinois at Urbana–Champaign.

== History ==
Eric W. Weisstein, the creator of the site, was a physics and astronomy student who got into the habit of writing notes on his mathematical readings. In 1995 he put his notes online and called it "Eric's Treasure Trove of Mathematics." It contained hundreds of pages/articles, covering a wide range of mathematical topics. The site became popular as an extensive single resource on mathematics on the web. In 1998, he made a contract with CRC Press and the contents of the site were published in print and CD-ROM form, titled CRC Concise Encyclopedia of Mathematics. The free online version became only partially accessible to the public. In 1999 Weisstein went to work for Wolfram Research, Inc. (WRI), and WRI renamed the Math Treasure Trove to MathWorld and hosted it on the company's website without access restrictions.

== CRC lawsuit ==
In 2000, CRC Press sued Wolfram Research Inc. (WRI), WRI president Stephen Wolfram, and author Eric W. Weisstein, due to what they considered a breach of contract: that the MathWorld content was to remain in print only. The site was taken down by a court injunction.

The case was settled out of court in late 2001, with WRI paying an unspecified amount and complying with other stipulations. Among these stipulations is the inclusion of a copyright notice at the bottom of the website and broad rights for the CRC Press to produce MathWorld in printed book form. In November 2001 site then became once again available free to the public. In 2008, the litigants reached an agreement to allow new edition of MathWorld to be printed.

This case made a wave of headlines in online publishing circles. The PlanetMath project was a result of MathWorld's being unavailable.

== See also ==
- List of online encyclopedias
- Wolfram Mathematica
