= P. R. Wallace =

Canadian physicist (1915–2006)

- Born: April 19, 1915; Toronto, Ontario, Canada
- Died: March 20, 2006 (aged 90); Victoria, British Columbia, Canada
- Education: University of Toronto
- Scientific career
- Fields: Theoretical physics
- Workplaces: University of Cincinnati; MIT; NRC (Can); McGill University; Université Paul Sabatier, Toulouse, France; Concordia University
- Doctoral advisor: Leopold Infeld

P. R. (Philip Russell; "Phil") Wallace (April 19, 1915 – March 20, 2006) was a Canadian theoretical physicist and long-time professor at McGill University. He was a Fellow of the Royal Society of Canada and Fellow of the National Academy of Sciences (India). He had a distinguished career as educator, researcher, and activist in science and society, but he is increasingly well known for his pioneering paper in 1947 on the band structure of graphite, and particularly graphene, the subject of the 2010 Nobel Prize in Physics.

== Early and wartime years ==
Born in Toronto in 1915, Wallace entered the University of Toronto in 1933, achieving a B.A. in mathematics in 1937, an M.A. in 1938, and a Ph.D. in applied mathematics in 1940 under Leopold Infeld with a thesis on electromagnetism in general relativity. Advised by L. J. Synge, then head of the Applied Mathematics Department at Toronto, to hold himself ready for war work in Canada, Wallace took a two-year job at the University of Cincinnati and then moved to a lectureship at MIT. In 1943 he was recruited to join the British-Canadian Atomic Energy Project at the National Research Council of Canada's Montreal Laboratory. From 1943 to 1946 Wallace worked as one of an impressive group of theorists and mathematicians led by George Placzek on nuclear reactor fundamentals, including study of the effects on graphite and other materials of intense neutron and ion bombardment. His assignment to visit N. F. Mott in Bristol, England for several months to learn what was known about graphite led Wallace to a lifelong interest in graphite and a career in condensed matter physics, not least his 1947 paper on the band structure of graphite.

== Academic and professional career ==
=== From mathematics to physics ===
When the Montreal effort moved to the Chalk River site in 1946, Wallace joined the Mathematics Department at McGill University and began to build a group of young theoretical physicists there. The anomaly, at least in North America, of theoretical physicists in the Math department, not in Physics, had historic roots at McGill, dating from Ernest Rutherford's time. More generally, Canadian universities followed the British model of separation of mathematics from physics, perhaps deigning to have a small separate department of applied mathematics. Rutherford's strongly expressed views solidified things at McGill for 50 years. But by the early 1960s circumstances had changed; Wallace and his group moved into the Physics Department. He has documented the post-war story of the growth of a tiny number of isolated theoretical physicists in Canada, basically "outsiders," into a viable community of "insiders," not only at McGill.

=== Research ===
Initially working in nuclear physics and properties of graphite, in the mid-1950s Wallace turned his attention to the newly discovered positron annihilation in solids and liquids. In 1960 he published what became a standard reference in the field. His later research focused on semiconductors and semimetals, particularly their behaviour under intense magnetic fields, with regular returns to properties of graphite. In addition to summer school proceedings, in 1969 he edited two volumes on superconductivity and in 1973 he co-edited a volume on new developments in semiconductors.

=== Teaching and mentoring ===
Wallace was a superb lecturer and mentor of students. His undergraduate course in methods of mathematical physics was inspirational. It allowed many students to see what a disciplined and well-trained mind could accomplish by applying mathematics to physical problems. More than a few careers were encouraged on their paths by Wallace's course. A text based on his notes was finally published in 1973. Over his career at McGill Wallace supervised over 30 graduate students to M.Sc. and Ph.D. degrees, more than one third of them Ph.D.s. After his retirement he continued to teach in France at the Paul Sabatier University in Toulouse.

=== Professional activities ===
Wallace was active in professional affairs, a co-founder of the Canadian Association of Physicists and founder and first chair of its Theoretical Physics Division, 1957–58. He served as Editor of the Canadian Journal of Physics, 1973–80, and on numerous advisory and planning committees for conferences. At McGill he was Director of the Institute of Theoretical Physics, 1966–70, and active in faculty and university affairs.

== Retirement ==
Retiring as Professor Emeritus in Physics in 1982, Wallace soon became Principal of the Science College, Concordia University in Montreal, 1984–1987. In the 1990s he began writing semi-popular books explaining physics to the layperson, "Physics: Imagination and Reality" and "Paradox Lost: Images of the Quantum". He died on March 20, 2006, in Victoria, British Columbia of complications of old age.

Obituaries appear in Physics in Canada and Physics Today.
