= Daniel Murray (mathematician) =

Canadian mathematician

Daniel Alexander Murray (1862–1934) was a Canadian mathematician.

Murray was born in Colchester County, Nova Scotia, and was educated at Dalhousie University and Johns Hopkins University, as well as universities in Berlin and Paris. He was successively associate professor of mathematics at New York University, instructor at Cornell University, professor at Dalhousie University, and, after 1907, professor of applied mathematics at McGill University.

== Publications ==
- Introductory Course in Differential Equations (1897)
- An Elementary Course in the Integral Calculus (1898)
- Plane and Spherical Trigonometry (1902)
- Essentials of Trigonometry and Mensuration (1909)
- Elements of Plane Trigonometry (1911)
