= Hans Zassenhaus =

German mathematician (1912–1991)

Hans Julius Zassenhaus
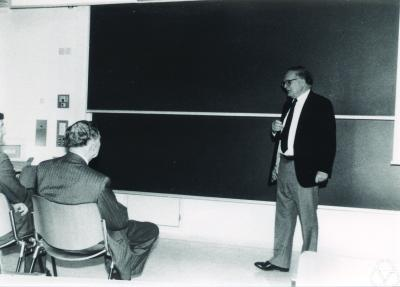
- Hans Julius Zassenhaus at the blackboard
- Born: 28 May 1912; Koblenz, German Empire
- Died: 21 November 1991 (aged 79); Columbus, Ohio, U.S.
- Education: University of Hamburg
- Known for: Zassenhaus algorithm Zassenhaus formula Zassenhaus group Zassenhaus lemma Zassenhaus neighbourhoods Berlekamp–Zassenhaus algorithm Cantor–Zassenhaus algorithm Schur–Zassenhaus theorem
- Awards: Jeffery–Williams Prize (1974); Lester R. Ford Award (1968)
- Scientific career
- Fields: Mathematics
- Workplaces: University of Rostock; McGill University; University of Notre Dame; Ohio State University
- Doctoral students: Joachim Lambek

Hans Julius Zassenhaus (28 May 1912 – 21 November 1991) was a German mathematician, known for work in many parts of abstract algebra, and as a pioneer of computer algebra.

== Biography ==
He was born in Koblenz in 1912. His father was a historian and advocate for Reverence for Life as expressed by Albert Schweitzer. Hans had two brothers, Guenther and Wilfred, and sister Hiltgunt, who wrote an autobiography in 1974. According to her, their father lost his position as school principal due to his philosophy. She wrote:

Hans, my eldest brother, studied mathematics. My brothers Guenther and Wilfred were in medical school. ... only students who participated in Nazi activities would get scholarships. That left us out. Together we made an all-out effort. ... soon our house became a beehive. Day in and day out for the next four years a small army of children of all ages would arrive to be tutored.

At the University of Hamburg Zassenhaus came under the influence of Emil Artin. As he wrote later:

His introductory course in analysis that I attended at the age of 17 converted me from a theoretical physicist to a mathematician.

When just 21, Zassenhaus was studying composition series in group theory. He proved his butterfly lemma that provides a refinement of two normal chains to isomorphic central chains. Inspired by Artin, Zassenhaus wrote a textbook Lehrbuch der Gruppentheorie that was later translated as Theory of Groups. His thesis was on doubly transitive permutation groups with Frobenius groups as stabilizers. These groups are now called Zassenhaus groups. They have had a deep impact on the classification of finite simple groups. He obtained his doctorate in June 1934, and took the teachers’ exam the next May. He became a scientific assistant at University of Rostock. In 1936 he became assistant to Artin back in Hamburg, but Artin departed for the USA the following year. Zassenhaus gave his Habilitation in 1938.

According to his sister Hiltgunt, Hans was "called up as a research scientist at a weather station" for his part in the German war effort.

Zassenhaus married Lieselotte Lohmann in 1942. The couple raised three children: Michael (born 1943), Angela (born 1947), and Peter (born 1949). In 1943 Zassenhaus became extraordinary professor. He became managing director of the Hamburg Mathematical Seminar.

After the war, and as a fellow of the British Council, Zassenhaus visited the University of Glasgow in 1948. There he was given an honorary Master of Arts degree. The following year he joined the faculty of McGill University where the endowments of Peter Redpath financed a professorship. He was at McGill for a decade with leaves of absence to the Institute for Advanced Study (1955/6) and California Institute of Technology (1958/9). There he was using computers to advance number theory. In 1959 Zassenhaus began teaching at University of Notre Dame and became director of its computing center in 1964.

Zassenhaus was a Mershon visiting professor at Ohio State University in the fall of 1963. In 1965 he came to Ohio State permanently. The mathematics department was led by Arnold Ross; Zassenhaus found a home there until his retirement in 1982. Nonetheless, he continued to take leaves of absence for visits to Göttingen (summer 1967), Heidelberg (summer 1969), UCLA (fall 1970), Warwick (fall 1972), CIT (1974/75), U Montreal (1977/78), Saarbrücken (1979/80).

He served as editor in chief of the Journal of Number Theory from its first issue in 1967. He won a Lester R. Ford Award in 1968.

Hans Zassenhaus died in Columbus, Ohio on November 21, 1991. His doctoral students include Joachim Lambek.

== Important publications ==
- Hans Zassenhaus (1937), Lehrbuch der Gruppentheorie ("Textbook of group theory"), 2nd edition (1960),The theory of groups.

A famous group theory book based on a course by Emil Artin given at the University of Hamburg during winter semester 1933 and summer semester 1934.

- Zassenhaus showed that there are just seven near-fields that are not division rings or Dickson near-fields in Abhandlungen aus dem Mathematischen Seminar der Universität Hamburg 11, pp 187–220.
- In 1977 Academic Press published Number Theory and Algebra, a collection of papers dedicated to Henry B. Mann, Arnold E. Ross, and Olga Taussky-Todd, edited by Zassenhaus (ISBN 0-12-776350-3). It included "A Theorem on Cyclic Algebras" by Zassenhaus.
- Cambridge University Press published Algorithmic Algebraic Number Theory written by Zassenhaus and M. Pohst in 1989 (ISBN 0-521-33060-2). A second edition appeared in 1993. Pohst, M.; Zassenhaus, H. (1997). 1st paperback edition. ISBN 978-0-521-59669-5.
- Cantor, David G.; Zassenhaus, Hans (April 1981), "A new algorithm for factoring polynomials over finite fields", Mathematics of Computation, 36 (154): 587–592, doi:10.1090/S0025-5718-1981-0606517-5, JSTOR 2007663, MR 0606517. The paper that introduced the Cantor–Zassenhaus algorithm for factoring polynomials.

== See also ==
- Pfister's sixteen-square identity
