= McGill School of Information Studies =

Coordinates: 45.50395°N 73.58041°W

The School of Information Studies (SIS) at McGill University is a school focused on the management and design of information resources, services, and systems to ensure adequate access to information and knowledge for all.

SIS has been offering programs at McGill since 1897, and its Masters program has been continuously accredited by the American Library Association since 1929.

The School is located in a historic building at 3661 Peel Street on the downtown McGill University campus.

== Programs ==
SIS offers the following graduate-level programs:

- Master of Information Studies (formerly Master of Library and Information Studies) with courses in Library Studies, Knowledge Management, Archival Studies, and Information & Communication Technology. Offered from 2014 onwards.
- PhD in Information Studies
- Graduate Certificate in Library and Information Studies for post-MLIS (or equivalent Masters)
- Graduate Certificate in Digital Archives Management
- Graduate Certificate in Information and Knowledge Management

== Research ==
SIS professors are engaged in the broad research area of Human Information Interaction (HII) with many projects falling in the core research areas:

- Human-Computer Interaction
- Information Behaviour & Services
- Information & Knowledge Management

The School is home to three affiliated research labs:

- Accessible Computing Technology (ACT) Research Lab
- Data Mining & Security (DMaS) Lab
- Multimodal Interaction Lab (MIL)

== History ==
Following the founding of an apprenticeship-training program in librarianship in 1897, the McGill Summer Library School was formally founded in 1904 under the jurisdiction of the University Library Committee to offer education in library administration. It was the first formal library education program in Canada, and one of the first university programs in librarianship outside of the United States. The School was renamed the Graduate School of Library Science in 1965, the Graduate School of Library and Information Studies in 1985, and the School of Information Studies in 2007.
