= CRC Press =

American publishing group

- Parent company: Taylor & Francis
- Status: Active
- Founded: 1903 (as Chemical Rubber Company)
- Country of origin: United States
- Headquarters location: Boca Raton, Florida
- Distribution: Worldwide
- Nonfiction topics: Technical textbooks (engineering, science, mathematics, business, information technology)
- Imprints: Chapman & Hall, Productivity Press, Auerbach Publications
- Official website: www.routledge.com/corporate/about-us/crc-press

The CRC Press is a publishing imprint principally for technical books. Many of its books are related to engineering, science and mathematics. Its scope also includes books on business, forensics and information technology. In 2003 the imprint was acquired by Taylor & Francis, a subsidiary of Informa. The CRC Press and Routledge imprints are key components of Taylor & Francis's academic publishing. As of 2025, the branding of CRC Press presents it as part of the Routledge branding.

== History ==
The CRC Press originated as the publishing component of the Chemical Rubber Company (CRC) in 1903 by brothers Arthur, Leo and Emanuel Friedman in Cleveland, Ohio, based on an earlier enterprise by Arthur, who had begun selling rubber laboratory aprons in 1900. The company gradually expanded to include sales of laboratory equipment to chemists. In 1913 the CRC offered a short (116-page) manual called the Rubber Handbook as an incentive for any purchase of a dozen aprons. Since then the Rubber Handbook has evolved into the CRC's flagship book, the CRC Handbook of Chemistry and Physics. Another one of CRC's highly successful reference handbooks, CRC Standard Mathematical Tables, has sold over 2 million copies.

In 1964, Chemical Rubber decided to focus on its publishing ventures, and in 1973 the company changed its name to CRC Press, Inc, and exited the manufacturing business, spinning off that line as the Lab Apparatus Company.

In 1986, CRC Press was bought by the Times Mirror Company. Times Mirror began exploring the possibility of a sale of CRC Press in 1996, and in December announced the sale of CRC to Information Ventures. In 2003, CRC became part of Taylor & Francis, which in 2004 became part of the UK publisher Informa.

== See also ==
- Chapman & Hall
- MathWorld
