= C8H8O3 =

The molecular formula C_{8}H_{8}O_{3} (molar mass: 152.15 g/mol) may refer to:

- Anisic acids
  - o-Anisic acid (2-methoxybenzoic acid)
  - m-Anisic acid (3-methoxybenzoic acid)
  - p-Anisic acid (4-methoxybenzoic acid)
- 3,4-Dihydroxyphenylacetaldehyde
- Hydroxymethoxybenzaldehydes
  - 2-Hydroxy-4-methoxybenzaldehyde
  - 2-Hydroxy-5-methoxybenzaldehyde
  - Vanillin (4-Hydroxy-3-methoxybenzaldehyde)
  - o-Vanillin (2-Hydroxy-3-methoxybenzaldehyde)
  - Isovanillin (3-Hydroxy-4-methoxybenzaldehyde)
- Hydroxyphenylacetic acid
  - 2-Hydroxyphenylacetic acid
  - 3-Hydroxyphenylacetic acid
  - 4-Hydroxyphenylacetic acid
- Mandelic acid
- Methylparaben
- Methyl salicylate
- Methylsalicylic acids
  - 3-Methylsalicylic acid
  - 4-Methylsalicylic acid
  - 5-Methylsalicylic acid
  - 6-Methylsalicylic acid
- Tetrahydrophthalic anhydride
