= Hydroxymethoxybenzaldehyde =

Hydroxymethoxybenzaldehyde may refer to:

- 2-Hydroxy-4-methoxybenzaldehyde
- 2-Hydroxy-5-methoxybenzaldehyde
- Vanillin (4-Hydroxy-3-methoxybenzaldehyde)
- o-Vanillin (2-Hydroxy-3-methoxybenzaldehyde)
- Isovanillin (3-Hydroxy-4-methoxybenzaldehyde)

== See also ==
- C8H8O3
