= Auguste André Thomas Cahours =

French chemist (1813–1891)

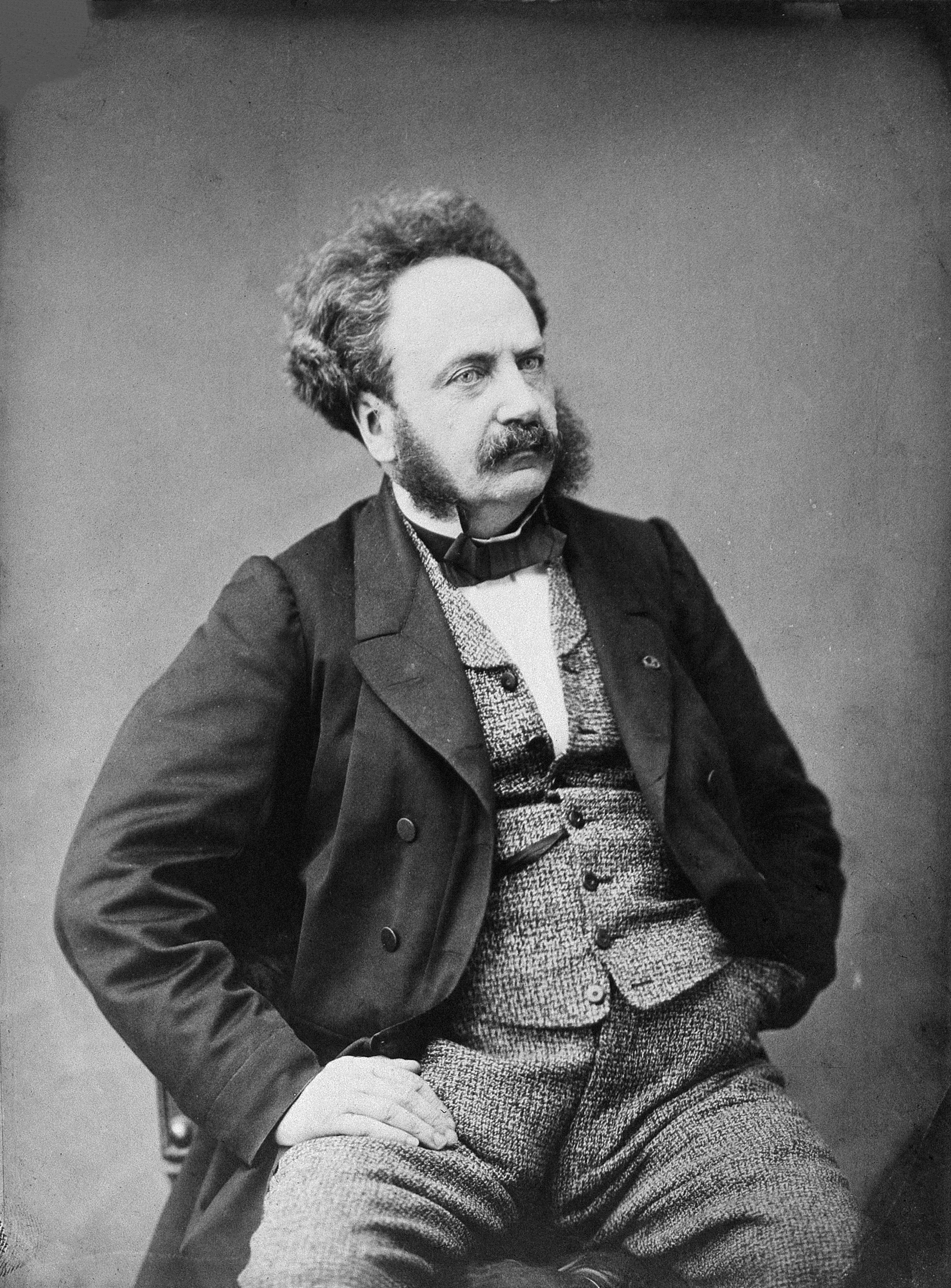
Auguste André Thomas Cahours

August André Thomas Cahours (1813–1891) was a French chemist and scientist who contributed to organic chemistry by discovering, among other things, the processes of synthesis of several chemical molecules, including toluene, xylene, several organo-magnesiums, and derivatives of phosphine and arsine.

He was a professor at the École Polytechnique and the École Centrale des Arts et Manufactures. In 1868 he was elected as a member of the Académie des sciences (chemistry section) and in 1880 became a commander of the Légion d'honneur.

== Early life ==
Auguste Cahours was born in Paris on 2 October 1813. He was the first of the two children of Rose Adelaide Cartront and André Cahours, who was an official at the French Ministry of Finance before becoming a tailor. He also owned his own shop on the Rue de Provence in Paris. Auguste had a younger brother named Louis, born on 18 June 1820. He attended his neighborhood high school before being admitted to the École Polytechnique in 1833, from where he obtained his diploma in 1835 and where he subsequently returned as a chemistry professor.

== Career ==
After graduating, he went up in the ranks of the French Army Corps, which he quickly and suddenly abandoned to concentrate on his interest in scientific research. He became, after his time in the army, the pupil of the renowned chemist Michel Eugene Chevreul and became his "preparer", a post he held for four years at the National Museum of Natural History from 1836 onwards.

In 1839, he was transferred to the private laboratory of Jean Baptiste André Dumas, who in the same year appointed him a "repeater" at the École Centrale des Arts et Manufactures. Dumas also put him in charge of the student laboratories. A year later, he became a volunteer "assistant tutor" at the Polytechnique, a position he held for 11 years until, in 1851, he was appointed "exit examiner" at the same school. His role was to monitor the progress of the Polytechnique students during their studies and classify them according to their merit upon leaving school. At the same time, he was appointed as a member of the School Improvement Council and replaced his former mentor, Chevreul, who had resigned.

Meanwhile, in 1845, Cahours obtained the title of Doctor of Science at the Faculty of Science in Paris and, in the same year, took the place of Dumas as the Chair of the General Chemistry Courses at the Ecole Centrale, a position he retained until 1870.

During his career, he occupied the post of Professor of Chemistry many tim.es. In 1851, he was appointed Professor of Chemistry at the School of Application of the Manufacture of Tobacco. He even replaced Dumas twice in his chemistry classes: the first time in 1851 at the Sorbonne and then at the chemistry department of the Ecole Centrale des Arts et Manufacture.

It was not until 1888 that he officially left the Ecole Polytechnique.

== Personal life ==
Auguste Cahours married Maria Robillard (born in 1821). The latter had two children: Georges, the elder, and André, the younger. A series of disasters between 1867 and 1871 resulted in the deaths of his wife, brother and two sons, the younger being killed during the Franco-German war. In 1881, at the age of 68, he remarried with Madeleine Levant. He died ten years later, on 17 March 1891, at the age of 78, in Paris.

== Discoveries ==
The discoveries of Auguste Cahours are numerous and affect a variety of fields. He worked with many renowned scientists including Bineau, Hofmann, and Gerhardt.

With Bineau, Cahours succeeded in determining the densities of vapor under atmospheric pressure. Then, with August Wilhelm von Hofmann, he discovered allylic alcohol. Cahours' work was oriented in three directions during his career:

I. The discovery and invention of new products (amyl and allyl alcohols, toluene, xylene, aliphatic hydrocarbons, cuminic and anisic acids, anethole, halogenated and nitrated derivatives, piperidine, vitelline, organometallic compounds)
II. The development of methodological tools (chlorination by PCl5, sulfonitration, synthesis of phenol esters, chemical identification using a bypass beam, systematic use of analogies)
III. Important contributions to the development of theories (valence: phosphines, arsines, organometallics, thiols; aromatic series isomers; atomic theory: vapor densities; series and function concepts: alcohols, allylic series, organometallics, between series and between functions; alkaloids: amino acids)

In Dumas’ laboratory, he studied potato essence. From a single impure sample of one liter belonging to Chevreul, he succeeded in defining and characterizing it as an alcohol. He gave it the name of amyl alcohol. At that time, neither the difference nor the methods of distinction between the primary, secondary and tertiary alcohols were well established and there was no spectroscopy. This product, along with spirit-of-wine (ethanol), spirit-of-wood (methanol) and ethyl of Chevreul (cetyl alcohol), became the fourth member of the series of alcohols. Moreover, in collaboration with many scientists, it allowed extraordinary advances in the categorization of compounds more or less known or completely unknown like cumene, the latter having been discovered in collaboration with Gerhardt when they underwent the same reaction as Mistcherlich subjected to benzoic acid, but this time to cuminic acid. Their interest in benzoic compounds led to the discovery of numerous aromatic compounds including cumene, cymene and cinnamene (styrene).

Cahours also did a great deal of research on salicylic acid and its derivatives, which he obtained thanks to the "essence of wintergreen", the latter being derived from a plant known as the Gaulthérie recumbent. The technique he used to obtain this acid was repeated many times by other scientists who also wished to obtain it, before being replaced by an industrial process, Kolbe's reaction, established by Adolph Wilhelm Hermann Kolbe between 1843 and 1845. This reaction involves a sodium phenolate ion which, after having been treated witth CO_{2} under high pressure and with sulfuric acid, forms salicylic acid.

It was later, when he was interested in phosphorus perchloride, that Cahours laid down a general precedent which made it possible to obtain the bases of acid chlorides, based on the reaction isolated by Liebig and Wöhler .

Auguste Cahours also worked on organometallics and showed that several substances, including tin, naturally sought to adopt a saturated configuration (SnX4).

== Accomplishments ==
Cahours was twice honored with the Jecker Prize by the Academy of Sciences: first in 1860 for his work on radicals (a prize he shared with Wurtz), and then again for his discoveries on steam densities in 1867.

In addition, he was successively honored with the titles of Knight (1846), Officer (1843), and Commander (1880) of the Legion of Honor.

In 1870, after the Franco-German War and with the help of Hoffman, he was the first French scientist to be recruited by the German Chemical Society. He was also a member of many other scientific orders, including:

- The Philatelic Society
- The Academy of Sciences and Belles-Lettres of Rouen
- The Academy of Sciences
- The Academy of Cherbourg
- The Academy of Dijon
- The Chemical Society of London
- The Berlin Academy (as a correspondent)
- The Academy of Sciences of St. Petersburg
