= Salicylate 1-O-methyltransferase =

Enzyme in flowering plants

Salicylate 1-O-methyltransferase (SAMT)

Identifiers
- EC no.: 2.1.1.274

Databases
- IntEnz: IntEnz view
- BRENDA: BRENDA entry
- ExPASy: NiceZyme view
- KEGG: KEGG entry
- MetaCyc: metabolic pathway
- PRIAM: profile
- PDB structures: RCSB PDB PDBe PDBsum
Search
- PMC: articles
- PubMed: articles
- NCBI: proteins

Salicylate 1-O-methyltransferase (abbrev. SAMT), also known as S-adenosyl-L-methionine:salicylic acid carboxyl methyltransferase and salicylate carboxymethyltransferase is a methyltransferase enzyme that is expressed in flowering plants that catalyzes the following chemical reaction

S adenosyl L-methionine + salicylate = S-adenosyl-L-homocysteine + methyl salicylate

The enzyme also possesses the activity of benzoate O-methyltransferase. While the enzyme from the plant zea mays is for benzoate, the enzymes from arabidopsis species and clarkia breweri also catalyze the reaction of this enzyme. In antirrhinum majus two isoforms exist, one for benzoate and one that is active to salicylate. Its volatile product is an odor compound in some species.
