= C8H6Cl2O3 =

The molecular formula C_{8}H_{6}Cl_{2}O_{3} (molar mass: 221.03 g/mol) may refer to:

- Dicamba, an herbicide
- 2,4-D (2,4-Dichlorophenoxyacetic acid), an herbicide
