= Methylsalicylate =

Methylsalicylate may refer to:

- The conjugate base of any of the four isomers of methylsalicylic acid
- Methyl salicylate, the methyl ester of salicylic acid
