= 5-Methylsalicylic acid =

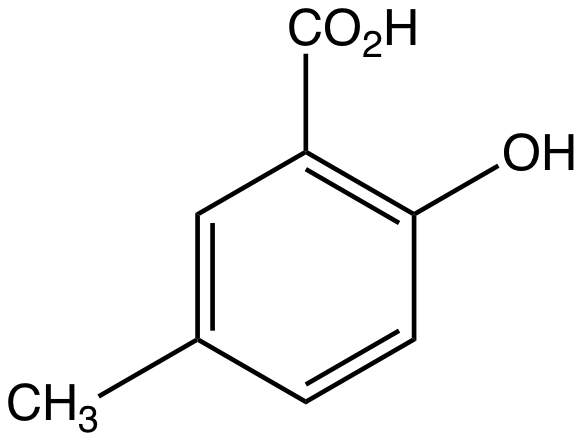

Names
- Preferred IUPAC name 2-Hydroxy-5-methylbenzoic acid
- Other names 2,5-Cresotic acid p-Cresotic acid p-Cresotinic acid 2-Hydroxy-m-toluic acid

Identifiers
CAS Number	89-56-5
3D model (JSmol)	Interactive image
ChEMBL	ChEMBL1161012
ChemSpider	6707
ECHA InfoCard	100.001.744
EC Number	201-918-6
PubChem CID	6973
UNII	6GAI2MTV5V
CompTox Dashboard (EPA)	DTXSID20237472
- InChI: InChI=1S/C8H8O3/c1-5-2-3-7(9)6(4-5)8(10)11/h2-4,9H,1H3,(H,10,11) Key: DLGBEGBHXSAQOC-UHFFFAOYSA-N
- SMILES: CC1=CC(=C(C=C1)O)C(=O)O

Properties
Chemical formula	C_{8}H_{8}O_{3}
Molar mass	152.149 g·mol^{−1}
Appearance	white solid
Density	1.31 g/cm^{3}
Melting point	151 °C (304 °F; 424 K)

Hazards
- GHS labelling
Pictograms	(GHS07: Exclamation mark)
Signal word	Warning
Hazard statements	H302, H315, H319, H335
Precautionary statements	P261, P264, P270, P271, P280, P301+P312, P302+P352, P304+P340, P305+P351+P338, P312, P321, P330, P332+P313, P337+P313, P362, P403+P233, P405, P501
- Except where otherwise noted, data are given for materials in their standard state (at 25 °C [77 °F], 100 kPa). Infobox references

5-Methylsalicylic acid is an organic compound with the formula CH_{3}C_{6}H_{3}(CO_{2}H)(OH). It is a white solid that is soluble in basic water and in polar organic solvents. At neutral pH, the acid exists as 5-methylsalicylate Its functional groups include a carboxylic acid and a phenol group. It is one of four isomers of methylsalicylic acid.

It can be prepared by hydroxylation of 3-methylbenzoic acid.

== See also ==
- 3-Methylsalicylic acid
- 4-Methylsalicylic acid
- 6-Methylsalicylic acid
