= Mondia ecornuta =

Scientific classification
- Kingdom: Plantae
- Clade: Tracheophytes
- Clade: Angiosperms
- Clade: Eudicots
- Clade: Asterids
- Order: Gentianales
- Family: Apocynaceae
- Genus: Mondia
- Species: M. ecornuta

Binomial name
- Mondia ecornuta (N.E.Br.) Bullock

Synonyms
- Chlorocodon ecornutus N.E.Br.

Species of plant

Mondia ecornuta is a species of flowering plant in the dogbane family (Apocynaceae). It is a woody liana native to coastal eastern Africa, from Kenya to Mozambique.

== Taxonomy ==
The species was first described as Chlorocodon ecornutus by Nicholas Edward Brown in 1895 from a specimen collected near Mombasa, Kenya. In 1961, Arthur Allman Bullock transferred it to the genus Mondia, resulting in the current binomial name. The genus Mondia was formerly placed in the family Periplocaceae, but molecular phylogenetic studies have subsumed Periplocaceae within Apocynaceae.

== Description ==
Mondia ecornuta is a liana that can exceed 5 m in length, producing a whitish latex when cut. The leaves are opposite, elliptic to ovate, 9–15 cm long by 4–10 cm wide, with an acuminate tip and an obtuse to cordate base. The lamina is thin‑leathery, bright green above and paler beneath. The inflorescence bears few flowers on a peduncle 1–3 cm long. The sepals are broadly elliptic to orbicular, 2–3 mm. The corolla has a very short tube (c. 0.5 mm) and five lobes of purple, dark maroon, or brownish colour, 7–10 mm by 4–5 mm. The corona lobes are bilobed and flap‑like. The fruit consists of a pair of follicles, each 10–12 cm long and 2–2.5 cm in diameter.

== Distribution and habitat ==
The species is recorded from southeastern Kenya (including the vicinity of Mombasa), Tanzania, and northern Mozambique. It grows in coastal bushland, woodland, dense forest, and mangrove margins, often on coral or limestone outcrops, from sea level up to 700 m altitude.

== Conservation ==
A 2024 global assessment of extinction risk for flowering plants, based on a machine‑learning model trained on IUCN Red List data, predicted that Mondia ecornuta is not currently threatened (categorized as “Least Concern” with high confidence). However, no formal IUCN assessment has yet been published.

== Uses ==
Documented uses of Mondia ecornuta are scarce in the scientific literature. Unlike the congeneric Mondia whitei, whose roots are widely traded as an aphrodisiac and tonic, no peer‑reviewed ethnobotanical studies specifically address M. ecornuta. The rootstock is reported to be aromatic, but detailed pharmacological or traditional use data are lacking.
