= C7H5ClO3 =

The molecular formula C_{7}H_{5}ClO_{3} (molar mass: 172.56 g/mol) may refer to:

- meta-Chloroperoxybenzoic acid
- Chlorosalicylic acid
