= 6-methylsalicylic-acid synthase =

Class of enzymes

6-methylsalicylic acid synthase

Identifiers
- EC no.: 2.3.1.165
- CAS no.: 9045-37-8

Databases
- IntEnz: IntEnz view
- BRENDA: BRENDA entry
- ExPASy: NiceZyme view
- KEGG: KEGG entry
- MetaCyc: metabolic pathway
- PRIAM: profile
- PDB structures: RCSB PDB PDBe PDBsum
- Gene Ontology: AmiGO / QuickGO
Search
- PMC: articles
- PubMed: articles
- NCBI: proteins

In enzymology, a 6-methylsalicylic-acid synthase (EC 2.3.1.165) is a polyketide synthase that catalyzes the chemical reaction

acetyl-CoA + 3 malonyl-CoA + NADPH + H^{+} $\rightleftharpoons$ 6-methylsalicylate + 4 CoA + 3 CO_{2} + NADP^{+} + H_{2}O

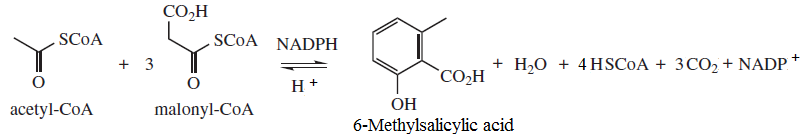

The 4 substrates of this enzyme are acetyl-CoA, malonyl-CoA, NADPH, and H^{+}, whereas its 5 products are 6-methylsalicylate, CoA, CO_{2}, NADP^{+}, and H_{2}O.

This enzyme belongs to the family of transferases, specifically those acyltransferases transferring groups other than aminoacyl groups. The systematic name of this enzyme class is acyl-CoA:malonyl-CoA C-acyltransferase (decarboxylating, oxoacyl-reducing, thioester-hydrolysing and cyclizing). Other names in common use include MSAS, and 6-methylsalicylic acid synthase.
