= C8H5Cl3O3 =

The molecular formula C_{8}H_{5}Cl_{3}O_{3} (molar mass: 255.48 g/mol) may refer to:

- 2,4,5-Trichlorophenoxyacetic acid
- Tricamba
