= Pentomone =

Chemical compound

Clinical data
- Other names: Lilly 113935; LY-113935
- Drug class: Nonsteroidal antiandrogen
- ATC code: None

Identifiers
- IUPAC name: (5aS,6aR,12aS,13aR)-4,8-dimethoxy-6,6-dimethyl-5a,6a,12,12a,13a,14-hexahydrochromeno[3,2-b]xanthen-13-one
- CAS Number: 67102-87-8
- PubChem CID: 49354
- ChemSpider: 44862
- UNII: OPS67T329P
- ChEMBL: ChEMBL2107005

Chemical and physical data
- Formula: C_{24}H_{26}O_{5}
- Molar mass: 394.467 g·mol^{−1}
- 3D model (JSmol): Interactive image
- SMILES: CC1(C2C(CC3=C(O2)C(=CC=C3)OC)C(=O)C4C1OC5=C(C4)C=CC=C5OC)C
- InChI: InChI=InChI=1S/C24H26O5/c1-24(2)22-15(11-13-7-5-9-17(26-3)20(13)28-22)19(25)16-12-14-8-6-10-18(27-4)21(14)29-23(16)24/h5-10,15-16,22-23H,11-12H2,1-4H3/t15-,16+,22-,23+; Key:MTJTVTZUEKVNTG-YJEDKTMASA-N

Pentomone (INN, USAN; development codes Lilly 113935 and LY-113935) is a nonsteroidal antiandrogen (NSAA) described as a "prostate growth inhibitor" which was never marketed. It was synthesized and assayed in 1978.

== Synthesis ==

Condensation of two equivalents of o-vanillin with 4,4-dimethylcyclohexadienone (2) gives the five-ring ketone derivative (3). The reaction may be visualized as initial conjugate addition of phenoxide to the enone followed by interception of the resulting anion by the aldehyde carbonyl group. Catalytic hydrogenation then reduces both olefin pi-bonds as well as the ketone, to give (4). Re-oxidation of the alcohol thus formed with pyridinium chlorochromate affords pentomone.
