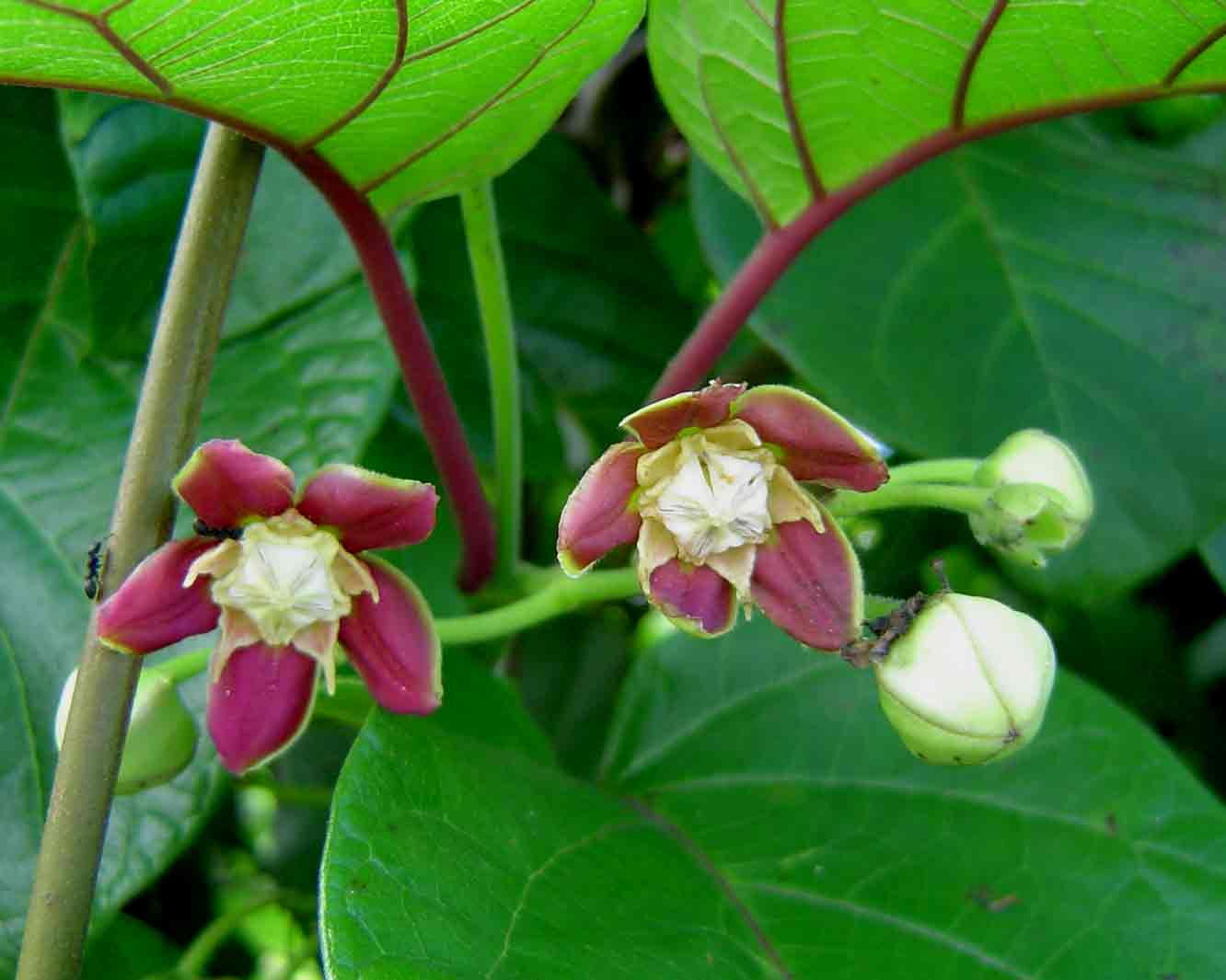
- Mondia whitei

Scientific classification
- Kingdom: Plantae
- Clade: Tracheophytes
- Clade: Angiosperms
- Clade: Eudicots
- Clade: Asterids
- Order: Gentianales
- Family: Apocynaceae
- Subfamily: Periplocoideae
- Genus: Mondia; Skeels

= Mondia (plant) =

Genus of plants

Mondia is a genus of flowering plants belonging to the family Apocynaceae.

Its native range is Tropical and Southern Africa.

Species:

- Mondia ecornuta (N.E.Br.) Bullock
- Mondia whitei (Hook.f.) Skeels
