= 6-methylsalicylate decarboxylase =

Class of enzymes

Identifiers
- EC no.: 4.1.1.52
- CAS no.: 37289-50-2

Databases
- BRENDA: enzyme data
- ExPASy: NiceZyme view
- KEGG: enzyme entry
- MetaCyc: metabolic pathway
- Rhea: reactions
- PDB structures: RCSB PDB PDBe PDBsum
- Gene Ontology: AmiGO / QuickGO
Search
- PMC: articles
- PubMed: articles
- NCBI: proteins

The enzyme 6-methylsalicylate decarboxylase (EC 4.1.1.52), characterised from Penicillium patulum. catalyzes the decarboxylation of 6-methylsalicylic acid to m-cresol and carbon dioxide:

6-methylsalicylic acid
CO_{2}
m-cresol

Patulin

The reaction is an early part of the biosynthetic pathway to patulin.

This enzyme is a lyase, specifically a carboxy-lyase, which cleave carbon-carbon bonds. The systematic name of this enzyme class is 6-methylsalicylate carboxy-lyase (3-cresol-forming). Other names in use include 6-methylsalicylic acid (2,6-cresotic acid) decarboxylase, 6-MSA decarboxylase, and 6-methylsalicylate carboxy-lyase.
