= 3,6-Dichlorosalicylic acid =

Names
- IUPAC name 3,6-Dichloro-2-hydroxybenzoic acid

Identifiers
CAS Number	3401-80-7
3D model (JSmol)	Interactive image
Beilstein Reference	2938787
ChEBI	CHEBI:141350
ChEMBL	ChEMBL1233461
ChemSpider	17793
ECHA InfoCard	100.020.251
EC Number	222-275-8
PubChem CID	18844
UNII	4YBF44H2O7
CompTox Dashboard (EPA)	DTXSID9041657
- InChI: InChI=1S/C7H4Cl2O3/c8-3-1-2-4(9)6(10)5(3)7(11)12/h1-2,10H,(H,11,12) Key: FKIKPQHMWFZFEB-UHFFFAOYSA-N
- SMILES: C1=CC(=C(C(=C1Cl)C(=O)O)O)Cl

Properties
Chemical formula	C_{7}H_{4}Cl_{2}O_{3}
Molar mass	207.01 g·mol^{−1}
Appearance	white solid
Melting point	187 °C (369 °F; 460 K)
- Except where otherwise noted, data are given for materials in their standard state (at 25 °C [77 °F], 100 kPa). Infobox references

3,6-Dichlorosalicylic acid (3,6-DCSA) is an organic compound with the formula Cl_{2}C_{6}H_{2}(OH)CO_{2}H. This isomer of dichlorosalicylic acid is of interest because it is the product of the enzymatic degradation of the controversial herbicide dicamba.

3,6-DCSA is the substrate for 3,6-DCSA decarboxylase, which converts it to 2,5-dichlorophenol.
