= Salicylate 1-monooxygenase =

Class of enzymes

Identifiers
- EC no.: 1.14.13.1
- CAS no.: 9059-28-3

Databases
- BRENDA: enzyme data
- ExPASy: NiceZyme view
- KEGG: enzyme entry
- MetaCyc: metabolic pathway
- Rhea: reactions
- PDB structures: RCSB PDB PDBe PDBsum
- Gene Ontology: AmiGO / QuickGO
Search
- PMC: articles
- PubMed: articles
- NCBI: proteins

Salicylate 1-monooxygenase (EC 1.14.13.1) is an enzyme that catalyzes the chemical reaction

salicylic acid
+ NADH
O_{2} + H^{+}
H_{2}O
catechol
+ NAD^{+} + CO_{2}

The four substrates of this enzyme are salicylic acid, reduced nicotinamide adenine dinucleotide (NADH), oxygen, and a proton, Its products are catechol, oxidised NAD^{+}, water, and carbon dioxide.

The enzyme is a flavin-containing monooxygenase that uses molecular oxygen as oxidant and incorporates one of its atoms into the starting material. This enzyme participates in metabolic pathways involving the degradation of naphthalene and anthracene and some of their derivatives. It uses flavin adenine dinucleotide as a cofactor.

== Nomenclature ==
The systematic name of this enzyme class is salicylate,NADH:oxygen oxidoreductase (1-hydroxylating, decarboxylating).

Other names in common use include:

- salicylate hydroxylase,
- salicylate 1-hydroxylase,
- salicylate monooxygenase, and
- salicylate hydroxylase (decarboxylating)
