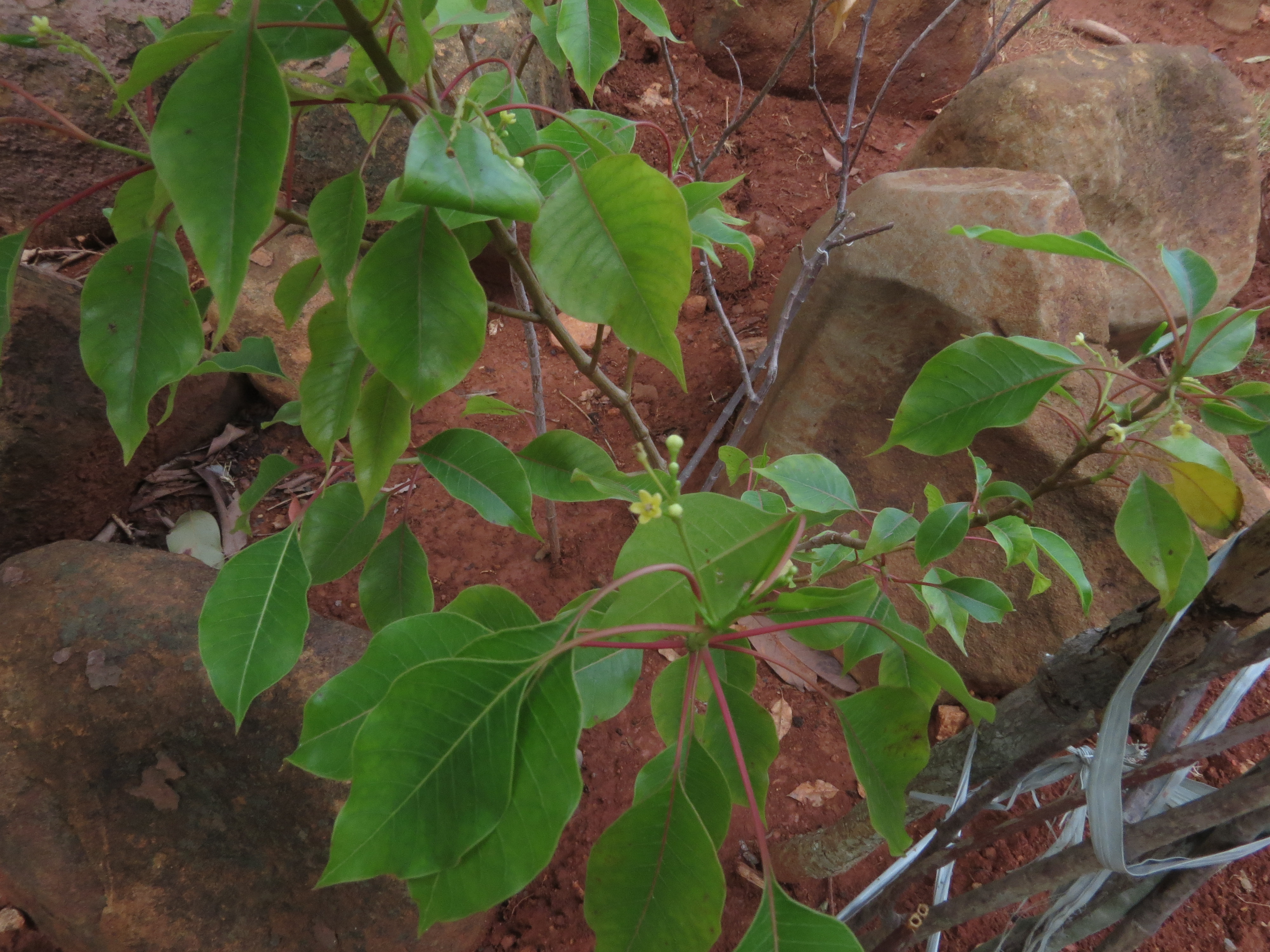

Scientific classification
- Kingdom: Plantae
- Clade: Tracheophytes
- Clade: Angiosperms
- Clade: Eudicots
- Clade: Asterids
- Order: Gentianales
- Family: Apocynaceae
- Genus: Decalepis
- Species: D. arayalpathra

Binomial name
- Decalepis arayalpathra (J.Joseph & V.Chandras.) Venter

= Decalepis arayalpathra =

Species of plant

Decalepis arayalpathra is a species of plant in the family Apocynaceae. It is endemic to Peninsular India and known by its names of amirtha palaM in Tamil is a plant whose root is used in Ayurvedic medicines.
