= Methylsalicylic acid =

Methylsalicylic acid may refer to:

- 3-Methylsalicylic acid
- 4-Methylsalicylic acid
- 5-Methylsalicylic acid
- 6-Methylsalicylic acid

== See also ==
- Methyl salicylate
