= Salicylic acid =

Chemical compound used in medicines and industry

Skeletal formula of salicylic acid
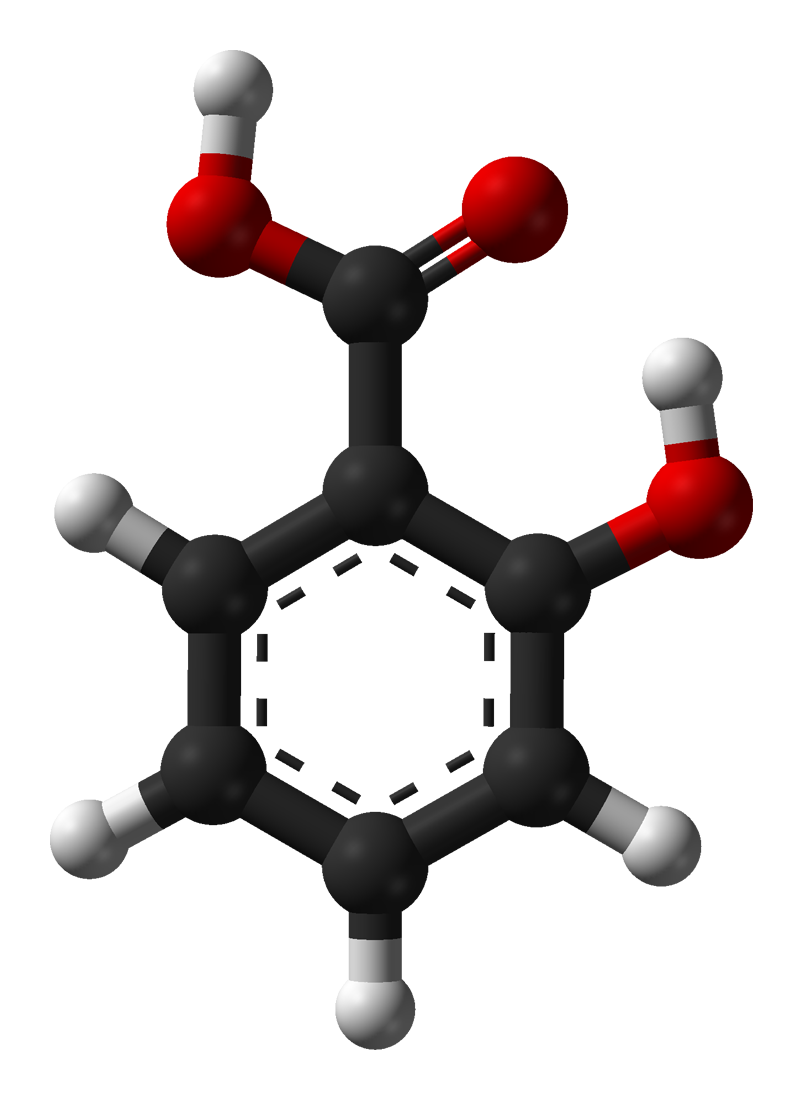
Ball-and-stick model of salicylic acid
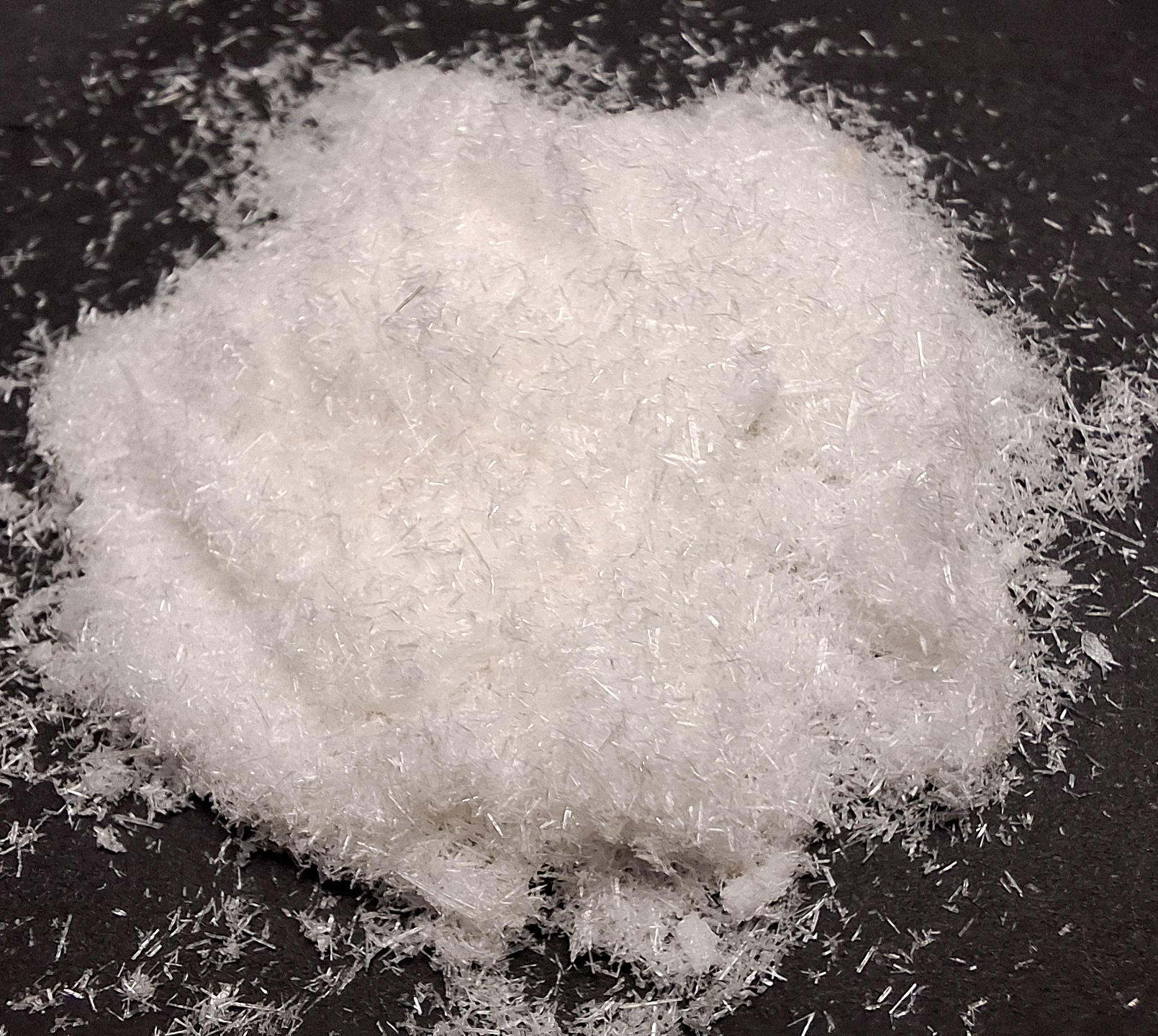
- Salicylic acid

Names
- Preferred IUPAC name 2-Hydroxybenzoic acid

Identifiers
CAS Number	69-72-7
3D model (JSmol)	Interactive image
ChEBI	CHEBI:16914
ChEMBL	ChEMBL424
ChemSpider	331
DrugBank	DB00936
ECHA InfoCard	100.000.648
EC Number	200-712-3
IUPHAR/BPS	4306
KEGG	D00097
PubChem CID	338
RTECS number	VO0525000
UNII	O414PZ4LPZ
CompTox Dashboard (EPA)	DTXSID7026368
- InChI: InChI=1S/C7H6O3/c8-6-4-2-1-3-5(6)7(9)10/h1-4,8H,(H,9,10) Key: YGSDEFSMJLZEOE-UHFFFAOYSA-N; InChI=1/C7H6O3/c8-6-4-2-1-3-5(6)7(9)10/h1-4,8H,(H,9,10) Key: YGSDEFSMJLZEOE-UHFFFAOYAQ
- SMILES: O=C(O)c1ccccc1O

Properties
Chemical formula	C_{7}H_{6}O_{3}
Molar mass	138.122 g·mol^{−1}
Appearance	Colorless to white crystalline powder
Odor	Odorless
Density	1.443 g/cm^{3} (20 °C)
Melting point	158.6 °C (317.5 °F; 431.8 K)
Boiling point	211 °C (412 °F; 484 K) at 20 mmHg
Sublimation conditions	Sublimes at 76 °C
Solubility in water	1.24 g/L (0 °C); 2.48 g/L (25 °C); 4.14 g/L (40 °C); 17.41 g/L (75 °C); 77.79 g/L (100 °C)
Solubility	Soluble in ether, CCl_{4}, benzene, propanol, acetone, ethanol, oil of turpentine, toluene
Solubility in benzene	0.46 g/100 g (11.7 °C); 0.775 g/100 g (25 °C); 0.991 g/100 g (30.5 °C); 2.38 g/100 g (49.4 °C); 4.4 g/100 g (64.2 °C)
Solubility in chloroform	2.22 g/100 mL (25 °C); 2.31 g/100 mL (30.5 °C)
Solubility in methanol	40.67 g/100 g (−3 °C); 62.48 g/100 g (21 °C)
Solubility in olive oil	2.43 g/100 g (23 °C)
Solubility in acetone	39.6 g/100 g (23 °C)
log P	2.26
Vapor pressure	10.93 mPa
Acidity (pK_{a})	1. 2.97 (25 °C); 2. 13.82 (20 °C)
UV-vis (λ_{max})	210 nm, 234 nm, 303 nm (4 mg/dL in ethanol)
Magnetic susceptibility (χ)	−72.23·10^{−6} cm^{3}/mol
Refractive index (n_{D})	1.565 (20 °C)
Dipole moment	2.65 D

Thermochemistry
Std enthalpy of formation (Δ_{f}H^{⦵}_{298})	−589.9 kJ/mol
Std enthalpy of combustion (Δ_{c}H^{⦵}_{298})	−3.025 MJ/mol

Pharmacology
ATC code	A01AD05 (WHO) B01AC06 (WHO) D01AE12 (WHO) N02BA01 (WHO) S01BC08 (WHO)

Hazards
- Occupational safety and health (OHS/OSH)
Eye hazards	Severe irritation
Skin hazards	Mild irritation
- GHS labelling
Pictograms	(GHS05: Corrosive) (GHS07: Exclamation mark)
Signal word	Danger
Hazard statements	H302, H318
Precautionary statements	P280, P305+P351+P338
NFPA 704 (fire diamond)	2 1 0
Flash point	157 °C (315 °F; 430 K) closed cup
Autoignition temperature	540 °C (1,004 °F; 813 K)
- Lethal dose or concentration (LD, LC)
LD_{50} (median dose)	480 mg/kg (mice, oral)
Safety data sheet (SDS)	MSDS

Related compounds
Related compounds	Methyl salicylate, Benzoic acid, Phenol, Aspirin, 4-Hydroxybenzoic acid, Magnesium salicylate, Choline salicylate, Bismuth subsalicylate, Sulfosalicylic acid
- Except where otherwise noted, data are given for materials in their standard state (at 25 °C [77 °F], 100 kPa). verify (what is ?) Infobox references

Salicylic acid is an organic compound with the formula C_{7}H_{6}O_{3}. A colorless (or white), bitter-tasting solid, it is a precursor to and a metabolite of acetylsalicylic acid (aspirin). It is a plant hormone, and the name is from Latin salix for willow tree, from which it was initially identified and derived. It is used as an ingredient in dermatologic cosmetics (e.g. anti-acne products). Salts and esters of salicylic acid are known as salicylates.

In the USA, it has been listed by the EPA Toxic Substances Control Act (TSCA) Chemical Substance Inventory as an experimental teratogen.

== Uses ==
=== Medicine ===
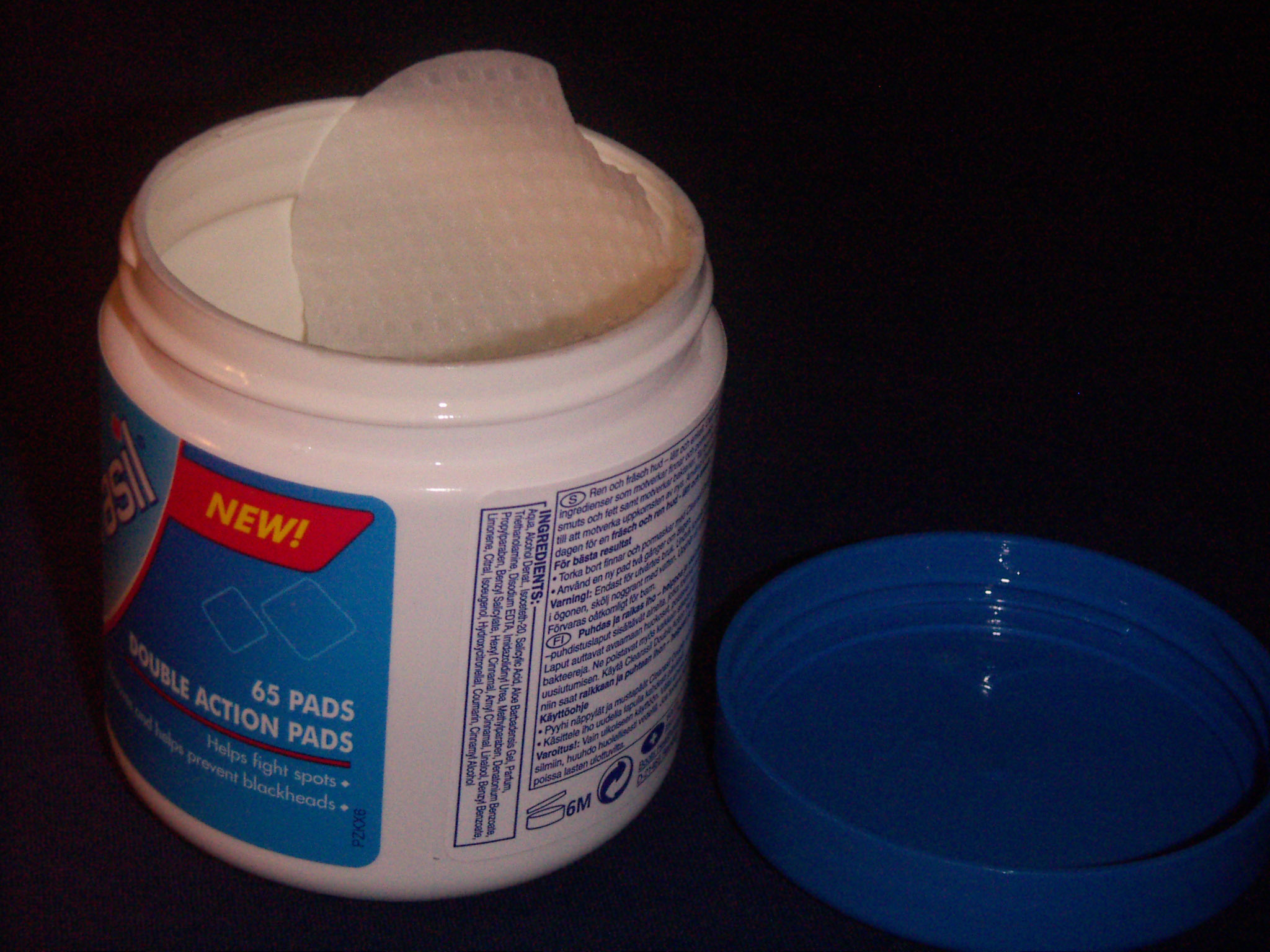
Cotton pads soaked in salicylic acid can be used to chemically exfoliate skin.

Salicylic acid as a medication is commonly used to remove the outermost layer of the skin. As such, it is used to treat warts, psoriasis, acne vulgaris, ringworm, dandruff, and ichthyosis.

Similar to other hydroxy acids, salicylic acid is an ingredient in many skincare products for the treatment of seborrhoeic dermatitis, acne, psoriasis, calluses, corns, keratosis pilaris, acanthosis nigricans, ichthyosis, and warts. In the European Union, salicylic acid is regulated as a cosmetic ingredient under Annex III (entry 98) of the Cosmetics Regulation (EC) No 1223/2009. For uses other than as a preservative it is permitted at concentrations up to 3.0% in rinse-off hair products and 2.0% in other products, with a lower limit of 0.5% in certain leave-on products such as body lotion and eye and lip cosmetics; it is separately permitted as a preservative at up to 0.5%. Reflecting its classification as toxic to reproduction (CMR category 2), it may not be used in products intended for children under three years of age (other than shampoos), in oral products, or in applications that could be inhaled.

=== Uses in manufacturing ===
Salicylic acid is used as a food preservative, a bactericide, and an antiseptic.

Salicylic acid is used in the production of other pharmaceuticals, including 4-aminosalicylic acid, sandulpiride, and landetimide (via salethamide). It is also used in picric acid production.

Salicylic acid has long been a key starting material for making acetylsalicylic acid (ASA or aspirin). ASA is prepared by the acetylation of salicylic acid with the acetyl group from acetic anhydride or acetyl chloride. ASA is the standard to which all the other non-steroidal anti-inflammatory drugs (NSAIDs) are compared. In veterinary medicine, this group of drugs is mainly used for treatment of inflammatory musculoskeletal disorders.

Bismuth subsalicylate, a salt of bismuth and salicylic acid, "displays anti-inflammatory action (due to salicylic acid) and also acts as an antacid and mild antibiotic". It is an active ingredient in stomach-relief aids such as Pepto-Bismol and some formulations of Kaopectate.

Other derivatives include methyl salicylate, used as a liniment to soothe joint and muscle pain, and choline salicylate, which is used topically to relieve the pain of mouth ulcers. Aminosalicylic acid is used to induce remission in ulcerative colitis, and has been used as an antitubercular agent often administered in association with isoniazid.

Sodium salicylate is a useful phosphor in the vacuum ultraviolet spectral range, with nearly flat quantum efficiency for wavelengths between 10 and 100 nm. It fluoresces in the blue at 420 nm. It is easily prepared on a clean surface by spraying a saturated solution of the salt in methanol followed by evaporation.

== Mechanism of action ==
Salicylic acid modulates COX-1 enzymatic activity to decrease the formation of pro-inflammatory prostaglandins. Salicylate may competitively inhibit prostaglandin formation.

Salicylic acid, when applied to the skin surface, works by causing the cells of the epidermis to slough off more readily, preventing pores from clogging up, and allowing room for new cell growth. Salicylic acid inhibits the oxidation of uridine-5-diphosphoglucose (UDPG) competitively with NADH and noncompetitively with UDPG. It also competitively inhibits the transferring of glucuronyl group of uridine-5-phosphoglucuronic acid to the phenolic acceptor.

The wound-healing retardation action of salicylates is probably due mainly to its inhibitory action on mucopolysaccharide synthesis.

== Safety ==
In excess, salicylates have toxic effects, which can be fatal. Toxicity is most often due to oral overdose.

Cosmetic applications of the drug pose no significant risk. Even in a worst-case use scenario in which one was using multiple salicylic acid-containing topical products, the aggregate plasma concentration of salicylic acid was well below what was permissible for acetylsalicylic acid (aspirin). Since oral aspirin (which produces much higher salicylic acid plasma concentrations than dermal salicylic acid applications) poses no significant adverse pregnancy outcomes in terms of frequency of stillbirth, birth defects or developmental delay, use of salicylic acid containing cosmetics is safe for pregnant women. Salicylic acid is present in most fruits and vegetables as for example in greatest quantities in berries and in beverages like tea.

In one documented case, a patient applied extreme levels of salicylate ointment topically (40% ointment, over 41% of the total skin surface), and subsequently received hemodialysis to reduce blood salicylate concentration.

== Production and chemical reactions ==
=== Biosynthesis ===
Two pathways for the biosynthesis of salicylic acid have been found in plants. The more widespread pathway is the phenylalanine lyase (PAL) pathway in which salicylic acid is synthesised from phenylalanine via cinnamic acid; this pathway is conserved across the seed plants. The alternative pathway involves synthesis from chorismate via isochorismate, and is therefore called the ICS or isochorismate synthase pathway. This pathway appears to have evolved more recently in the Brassicales, and is consequently found in Arabidopsis thaliana.

=== Chemical synthesis ===
Commercial vendors prepare sodium salicylate by treating sodium phenolate (the sodium salt of phenol) with carbon dioxide at high pressure (100 atm) and high temperature (115 °C) – a method known as the Kolbe-Schmitt reaction. Acidifying the product with sulfuric acid gives salicylic acid:

At the laboratory scale, it can also be prepared by the hydrolysis of aspirin (acetylsalicylic acid) or methyl salicylate (oil of wintergreen) with a strong acid or base; these reactions reverse those chemicals' commercial syntheses.

=== Reactions ===
Upon heating, salicylic acid converts to phenyl salicylate:

2 HOC_{6}H_{4}CO_{2}H → C_{6}H_{5}O_{2}C_{6}H_{4}OH + CO_{2} + H_{2}O

Further heating gives xanthone.

Salicylic acid as its conjugate base is a chelating agent, with an affinity for iron(III).

Salicylic acid slowly degrades to phenol and carbon dioxide at 200–230 °C:

C_{6}H_{4}OH(CO_{2}H) → C_{6}H_{5}OH + CO_{2}

All isomers of chlorosalicylic acid and of dichlorosalicylic acid are known. 5-Chlorosalicylic acid is produced by direct chlorination of salicylic acid.

== History ==
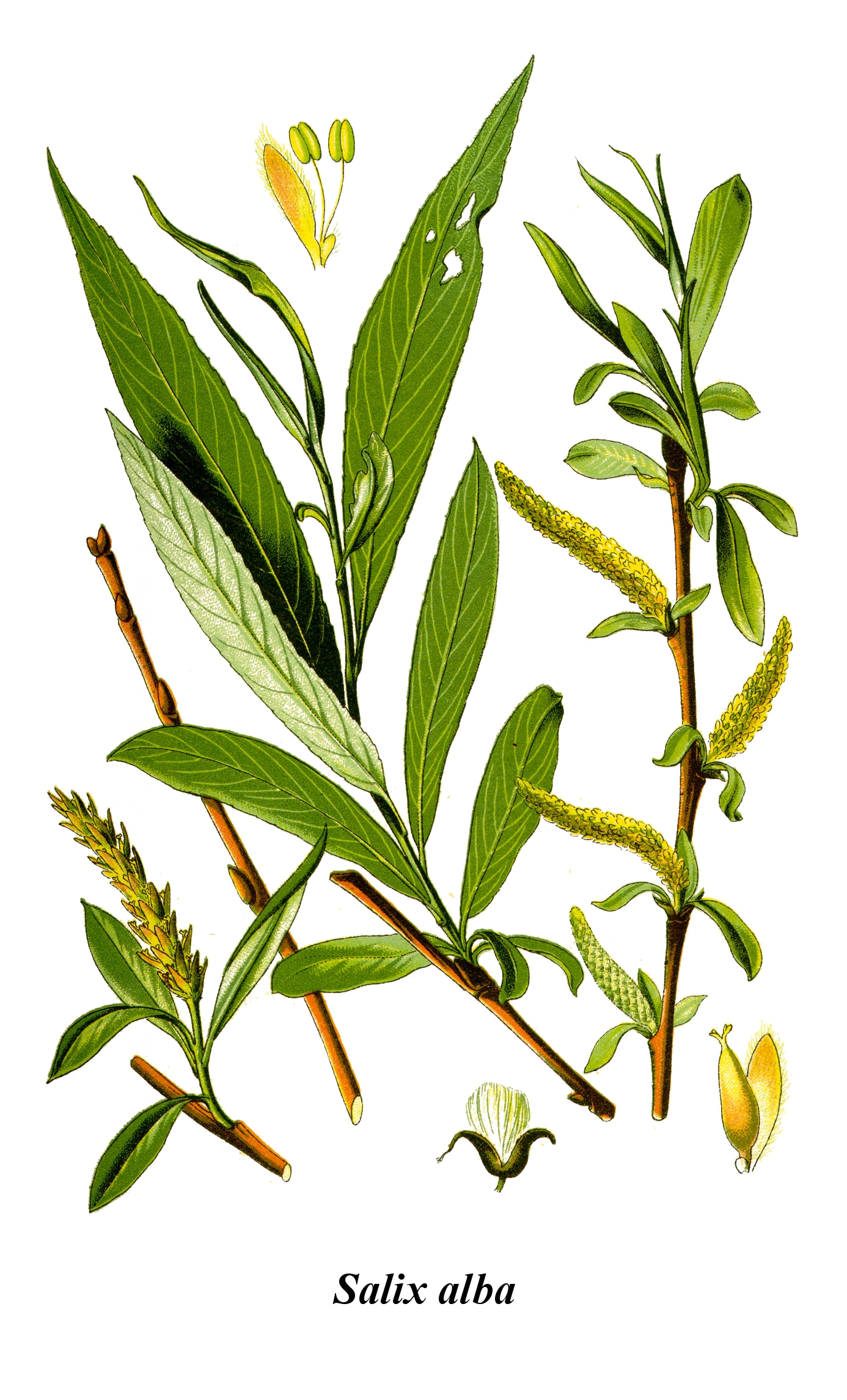
White willow (Salix alba) is a natural source of salicylic acid.

Willow has long been used for medicinal purposes. Dioscorides, whose writings were highly influential for more than 1,500 years, used "Itea" (which was possibly a species of willow) as a treatment for "painful intestinal obstructions", birth control, for "those who spit blood", to remove calluses and corns and, externally, as a "warm pack for gout". William Turner, in 1597, repeated this, saying that willow bark, "being burnt to ashes, and steeped in vinegar, takes away corns and other like risings in the feet and toes". Some of these cures may describe the action of salicylic acid, which can be derived from the salicin present in willow. It is, however, a modern myth that Hippocrates used willow as a painkiller.

Hippocrates, Galen, Pliny the Elder, and others knew that decoctions containing salicylate could ease pain and reduce fevers.

It was used in Europe and China to treat these conditions. This remedy is mentioned in texts from Ancient Egypt, Sumer, and Assyria.

The Cherokee and other Native Americans use an infusion of the bark for fever and other medicinal purposes. In 2014, archaeologists identified traces of salicylic acid on seventh-century pottery fragments found in east-central Colorado.

Edward Stone, a vicar from Chipping Norton, Oxfordshire, England, reported in 1763 that the bark of the willow was effective in reducing a fever.

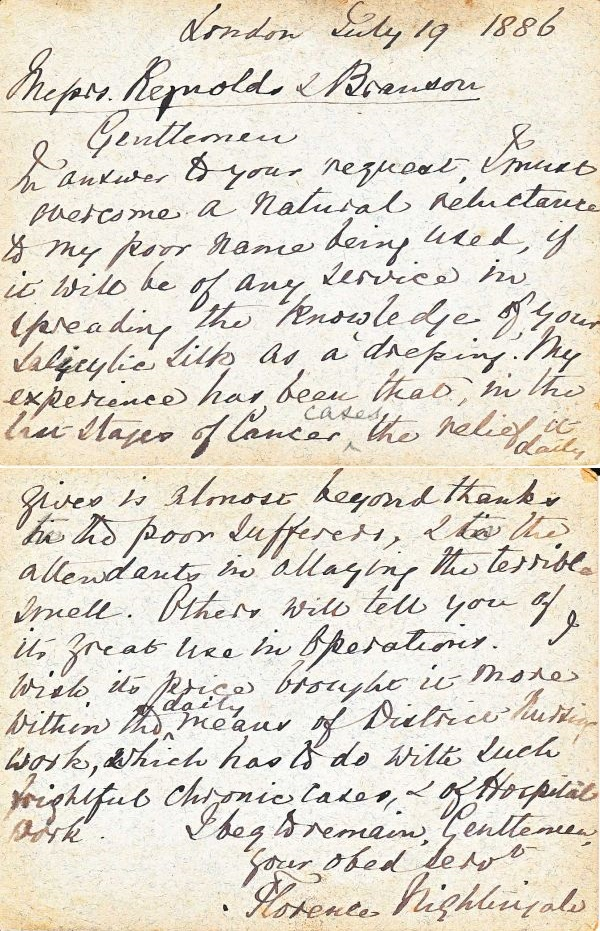
Letter from Florence Nightingale on "salicylic silk" as a dressing for cancer patients

An extract of willow bark, called salicin, after the Latin name for the white willow (Salix alba), was isolated and named by German chemist Johann Andreas Buchner in 1828. A larger amount of the substance was isolated in 1829 by Henri Leroux, a French pharmacist. Raffaele Piria, an Italian chemist, was able to convert the substance into a sugar and a second component, which on oxidation becomes salicylic acid.

Salicylic acid was also isolated from the herb meadowsweet (Filipendula ulmaria, formerly classified as Spiraea ulmaria) by German researchers in 1839. Their extract caused digestive problems such as gastric irritation, bleeding, diarrhea, and even death when consumed in high doses.

In 1874 the Scottish physician Thomas MacLagan experimented with salicin as a treatment for acute rheumatism, with considerable success, as he reported in The Lancet in 1876. Meanwhile, German scientists tried sodium salicylate with less success and more severe side effects.

In 1979, salicylates were found to be involved in induced defenses of the tobacco plant against tobacco mosaic virus. In 1987, salicylic acid was identified as the long-sought signal that causes thermogenic plants, such as the voodoo lily, Sauromatum guttatum, to produce heat.

== Dietary sources ==
Salicylic acid occurs in plants as free salicylic acid and its carboxylated esters and phenolic glycosides. Several studies suggest that humans metabolize salicylic acid in measurable quantities from these plants. High-salicylate beverages and foods include beer, coffee, tea, numerous fruits and vegetables, sweet potato, nuts, and olive oil. Meat, poultry, fish, eggs, dairy products, sugar, breads and cereals have low salicylate content.

Some people with sensitivity to dietary salicylates may have symptoms of allergic reaction, such as bronchial asthma, rhinitis, gastrointestinal disorders, or diarrhea, so may need to adopt a low-salicylate diet.

== Plant hormone ==
Salicylic acid is a phenolic phytohormone, and is found in plants with roles in plant growth and development, photosynthesis, transpiration, and ion uptake and transport. Salicylic acid is involved in endogenous signaling, mediating plant defense against pathogens. It plays a role in the resistance to pathogens (i.e. systemic acquired resistance, SAR) by inducing the production of pathogenesis-related proteins and other defensive metabolites. SA's defence signalling role is most clearly demonstrated by experiments which do away with it: Delaney et al. 1994, Gaffney et al. 1993, Lawton et al. 1995, and Vernooij et al. 1994, each use Nicotiana tabacum or Arabidopsis expressing nahG, for salicylate hydroxylase. Pathogen inoculation did not produce the customarily high SA levels, SAR was not produced, and no pathogenesis-related (PR) genes were expressed in systemic leaves. Indeed, the subjects were more susceptible to virulent – and even normally avirulent – pathogens.

Exogenously, salicylic acid can aid plant development via enhanced seed germination, bud flowering, and fruit ripening, though too high of a concentration of salicylic acid can negatively regulate these developmental processes.

The volatile methyl ester of salicylic acid, methyl salicylate, can also diffuse through the air, facilitating plant-plant communication. Methyl salicylate is taken up by the stomata of the nearby plant, where it can induce an immune response after being converted back to salicylic acid.

=== Signal transduction ===
A number of proteins have been identified that interact with SA in plants, especially salicylic acid binding proteins (SABPs) and the NPR genes (nonexpressor of pathogenesis-related genes), which are putative receptors.
