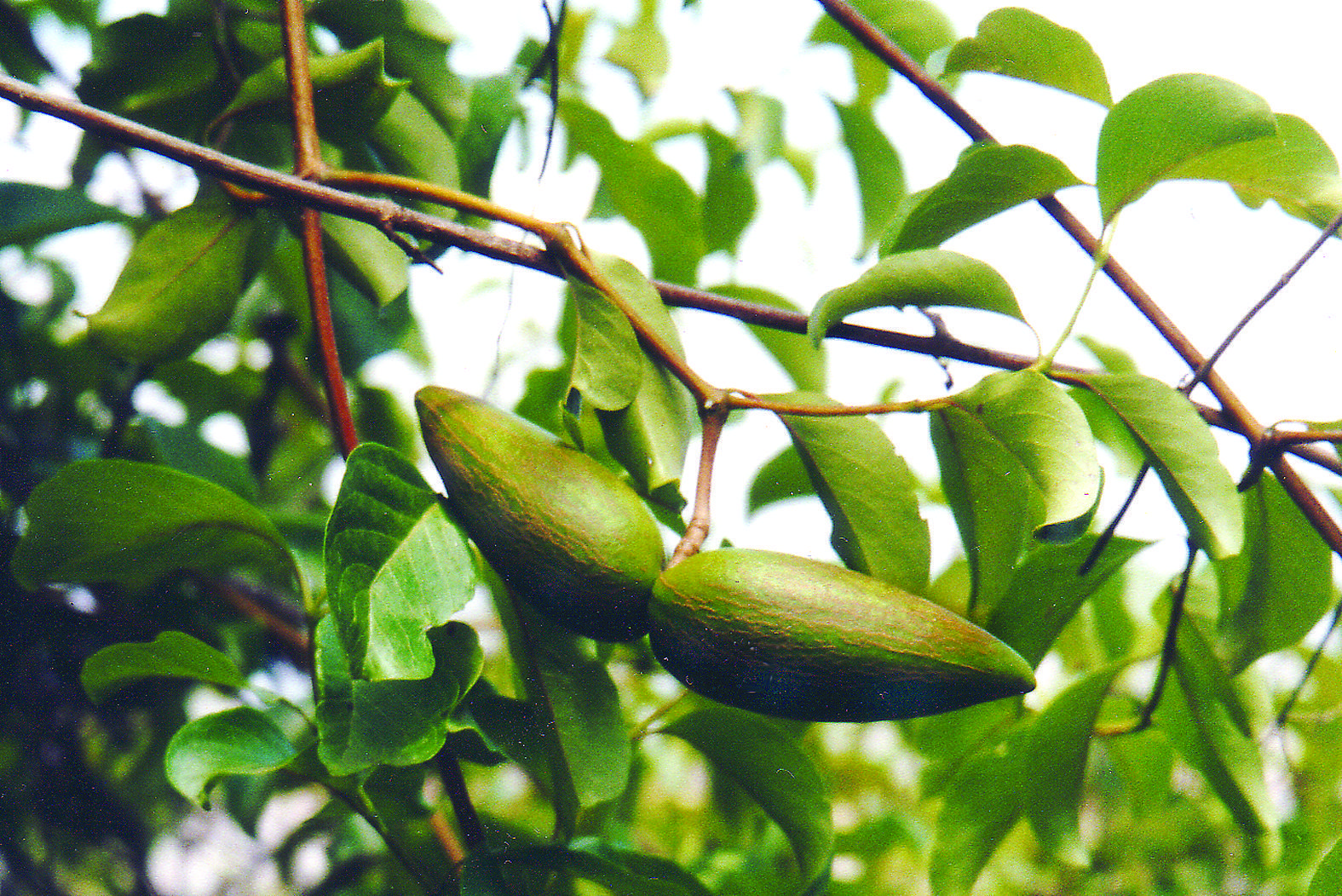
- Decalepis hamiltonii fruit

Scientific classification
- Kingdom: Plantae
- Clade: Tracheophytes
- Clade: Angiosperms
- Clade: Eudicots
- Clade: Asterids
- Order: Gentianales
- Family: Apocynaceae
- Subfamily: Periplocoideae
- Genus: Decalepis; Wight & Arn.

Type species
- Decalepis hamiltonii Wight & Arn.

Synonyms
- Janakia J.Joseph & V.Chandras.

= Decalepis =

Genus of plants

Decalepis is a genus of plants in the family Apocynaceae.

Species include:

- Decalepis arayalpathra (J.Joseph & V.Chandras.) Venter
- Decalepis hamiltonii Wight & Arn.
- Decalepis nervosa (Wight & Arn.) Venter
- Decalepis salicifolia (Bedd. ex Hook.f.)
