= Dichlorosalicylic acid =

Dichlorosalicylic acid may refer to:

- 3,4-Dichlorosalicylic acid, RN = 14010-45-8, m.p. not available
- 3,5-Dichlorosalicylic acid, RN = 320-72-9, m.p. 220-221 °C
- 3,6-Dichlorosalicylic acid, RN = 3401-80-7, m.p. 187 °C
- 4,5-Dichlorosalicylic acid, RN = 50274-58-3, m.p. not available
- 4,6-Dichlorosalicylic acid, RN = 99725-34-5, m.p. not available
- 5,6-Dichlorosalicylic acid, RN = 1806282-06-3, m.p. not available

3,6-Dichlorosalicylic acid is the principal product of the biodegradation of the herbicide dicamba.

== See also ==
- Chlorosalicylic acid
