= Decalepis salicifolia =

Scientific classification
- Kingdom: Plantae
- Clade: Tracheophytes
- Clade: Angiosperms
- Clade: Eudicots
- Clade: Asterids
- Order: Gentianales
- Family: Apocynaceae
- Genus: Decalepis
- Species: D. salicifolia

Binomial name
- Decalepis salicifolia (Bedd. ex Hook.f.) Bruyns

Species of plant

Decalesis salicifolia is a species of flowering plant in the family Apocynaceae, native to the Laccadive Islands and south-west India.

Considered Critically Endangered due to over-harvesting of the fragrant roots. The major component of the essential oil of the roots is the fragrant phenolic compound 2-hydroxy-4-methoxybenzaldehyde, a positional isomer of vanillin.
