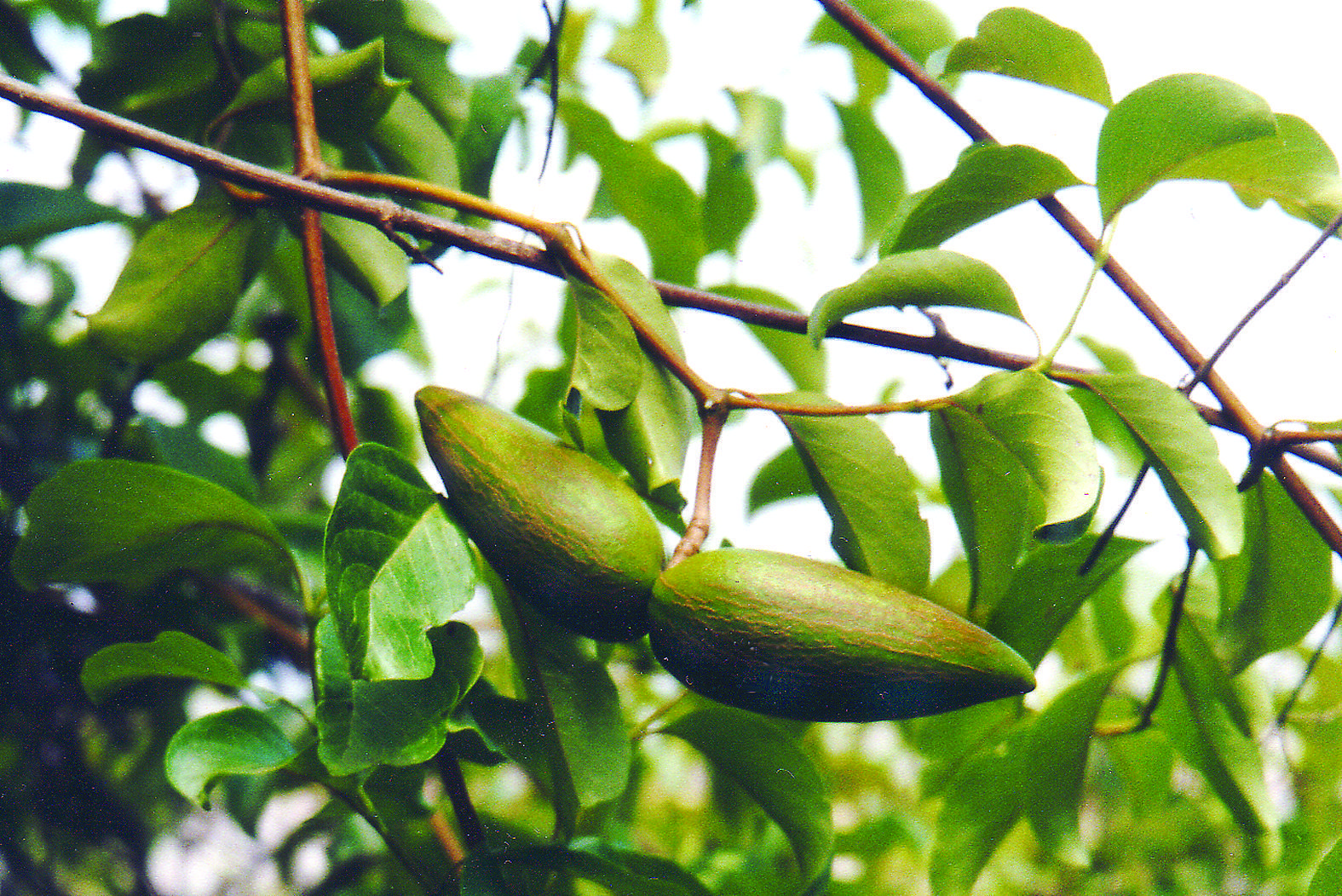

Conservation status
- Endangered (IUCN 3.1)

Scientific classification
- Kingdom: Plantae
- Clade: Tracheophytes
- Clade: Angiosperms
- Clade: Eudicots
- Clade: Asterids
- Order: Gentianales
- Family: Apocynaceae
- Genus: Decalepis
- Species: D. hamiltonii

Binomial name
- Decalepis hamiltonii Wight & Arn.

Synonyms
- Apocynum reticulatum Wall.; Streptocaulon hamiltonii Wight

= Decalepis hamiltonii =

Species of plant

Decalepis hamiltonii is a species of plant in the family Apocynaceae. It is endemic to Peninsular India and known by the names maredu kommulu, nannari kommulu and madina kommulu in Telugu, makali beru and mangani beru in Kannada and magali kizhangu in Tamil. The root is used in Ayurvedic medicines, to make pickles and to make the drink sharbat.

The major component of the essential oil of the root is the fragrant phenolic compound 2-hydroxy-4-methoxybenzaldehyde, a positional isomer of vanillin.

The English name swallowroot is sometimes used for the plant and studies have shown that it has insecticidal activity and a potential use in control of stored grain pests. The active ingredient in the root was synthesized and encapsulated with beta-cyclodextrins. The roots were also subjected to supercritical carbon-dioxide based extraction at the Central Food Technological Research Institute, Mysore, India.

The root contains antioxidants and extraction methods for it have been patented.

The rising popularity of the drink in the international market has made its price soar and has put the species on the endangered list. Cultivation has been successfully trialled. The roots can be ready for harvest 12-14 months after sowing. An average of 7,500-15,000 kg of roots can be harvested from one hectare. The roots can be harvested by digging around the plant leaving the central core of the root and stem. The plant can go on to produce for 4-5 years since regrowth is vigorous.
