= Tricamba =

Names
- Preferred IUPAC name 2,3,5-trichloro-6-methoxybenzoic acid
- Other names 3,5,6-trichloro-o-anisic acid

Identifiers
CAS Number	2307-49-5
3D model (JSmol)	Interactive image
ChEBI	CHEBI:82184
ChEMBL	ChEMBL2260705
ChemSpider	15943
ECHA InfoCard	100.017.260
EC Number	218-985-2
KEGG	C19057
PubChem CID	16824
UNII	TK58UR1S48
CompTox Dashboard (EPA)	DTXSID2042486
- InChI: InChI=1S/C8H5Cl3O3/c1-14-7-4(10)2-3(9)6(11)5(7)8(12)13/h2H,1H3,(H,12,13) Key: WCLDITPGPXSPGV-UHFFFAOYSA-N
- SMILES: COc1c(Cl)cc(Cl)c(Cl)c1C(=O)O

Properties
Chemical formula	C_{8}H_{5}Cl_{3}O_{3}
Molar mass	255.48 g·mol^{−1}
Appearance	White crystalline solid
Solubility in water	Slightly soluble

Hazards
- Occupational safety and health (OHS/OSH)
Main hazards	Moderate toxicity, respiratory, eye and skin irritation
- GHS labelling
Pictograms	(GHS07: Exclamation mark)
Signal word	Warning
Hazard statements	H302, H315, H319, H335
Precautionary statements	P261, P264, P264+P265, P270, P271, P280, P301+P317, P302+P352, P304+P340, P305+P351+P338, P319, P321, P330, P332+P317, P337+P317, P362+P364, P403+P233, P405, P501
- Lethal dose or concentration (LD, LC)
LD_{50} (median dose)	970 mg/kg (oral, rat); 1000 mg/kg (dermal, rat)

Related compounds
Related compounds	Dicamba
- Except where otherwise noted, data are given for materials in their standard state (at 25 °C [77 °F], 100 kPa). Infobox references

Tricamba is an obsolete benzoic acid herbicide once used to control annual and perennial weeds, similar to dicamba. It is selective, systemic, and absorbed through leaves. It was introduced in the early 1960s.

== Chemical properties ==
Tricamba is achiral, and while only slightly soluble in water, is soluble in most organic solvents, and forms water-soluble alkali metal salts. It is stable to oxidation and hydrolisis under conventional conditions.

== Safety ==
Tricamba is of low toxicity to mammals and birds. Its LD_{50} ranges from 283 to 951 mg/kg depending on species. It is of low dietary toxicity, and is unlikely to be hazardous in normal agricultural usage. Tricamba is significantly more toxic than dicamba.

== Tradenames ==
It has been sold under the tradename "Banvel T".

== Links ==
- Tricamba in the Pesticide Properties DataBase (PPDB)
- Tricamba, EPA
