= Periploca =

Periploca may refer to two different genera:

- Periploca (moth), in the family Cosmopterigidae
- Periploca (plant), in the family Apocynaceae
