= Dicamba =

Chemical compound used as herbicide

Names
- Preferred IUPAC name 3,6-Dichloro-2-methoxybenzoic acid
- Other names 3,6-Dichloro-o-anisic acid Dianat

Identifiers
CAS Number	1918-00-9
3D model (JSmol)	Interactive image
ChEBI	CHEBI:81856
ChEMBL	ChEMBL476936
ChemSpider	2922
ECHA InfoCard	100.016.033
KEGG	C18597
PubChem CID	3030
UNII	SJG3M6RY6H
CompTox Dashboard (EPA)	DTXSID4024018
- InChI: InChI=1S/C8H6Cl2O3/c1-13-7-5(10)3-2-4(9)6(7)8(11)12/h2-3H,1H3,(H,11,12) Key: IWEDIXLBFLAXBO-UHFFFAOYSA-N; InChI=1/C8H6Cl2O3/c1-13-7-5(10)3-2-4(9)6(7)8(11)12/h2-3H,1H3,(H,11,12) Key: IWEDIXLBFLAXBO-UHFFFAOYAV
- SMILES: Clc1ccc(Cl)c(c1OC)C(=O)O

Properties
Chemical formula	C_{8}H_{6}Cl_{2}O_{3}
Molar mass	221.03 g·mol^{−1}
Appearance	White crystalline solid
Density	1.57
Melting point	114 to 116 °C (237 to 241 °F; 387 to 389 K)
Solubility in water	"low"
Solubility in acetone	810 g/L
Solubility in ethanol	922 g/L

Hazards
- GHS labelling
Pictograms	(GHS05: Corrosive) (GHS07: Exclamation mark)
Signal word	Danger
Hazard statements	H302, H318, H412
Precautionary statements	P273, P280, P305+P351+P338
Flash point	199 °C (390 °F; 472 K)

Related compounds
Related compounds	Tricamba
- Except where otherwise noted, data are given for materials in their standard state (at 25 °C [77 °F], 100 kPa). Infobox references

Dicamba (3,6-dichloro-2-methoxybenzoic acid) is a selective systemic herbicide first registered in 1967. Brand names for formulations of this herbicide include Dianat, Banvel, Diablo, Oracle and Vanquish. This chemical compound is a chlorinated derivative of o-anisic acid.

It was described in a 2007 study supported by Monsanto as a "widely used, low-cost, environmentally friendly herbicide that does not persist in soils and shows little or no toxicity to wildlife and humans." Despite its success in improving crop yields, dicamba has attracted controversy. According to the United States Environmental Protection Agency (EPA), dicamba's primary ecological risk is for non-target terrestrial plants from exposure through spray drift, whereby dicamba inadvertently migrates to non-targeted neighboring areas, damaging those plants.

In 2016, dicamba was approved for use in the United States over GMO dicamba-resistant crops created by Monsanto. Dicamba came under significant scrutiny due to its tendency to spread from treated fields into neighboring fields, causing severe damage. The controversy led to litigation, state bans and additional restrictions over dicamba use.

== Preparation ==
Dicamba can be produced by hydrolysis of 1,2,4-trichlorobenzene with NaOH to form 2,5-dichlorophenol, then carboxylation, esterification with CH_{3}OH, methylation of the hydroxy group, and finally hydrolysis of the ester to produce dicamba.

== Use as an herbicide ==
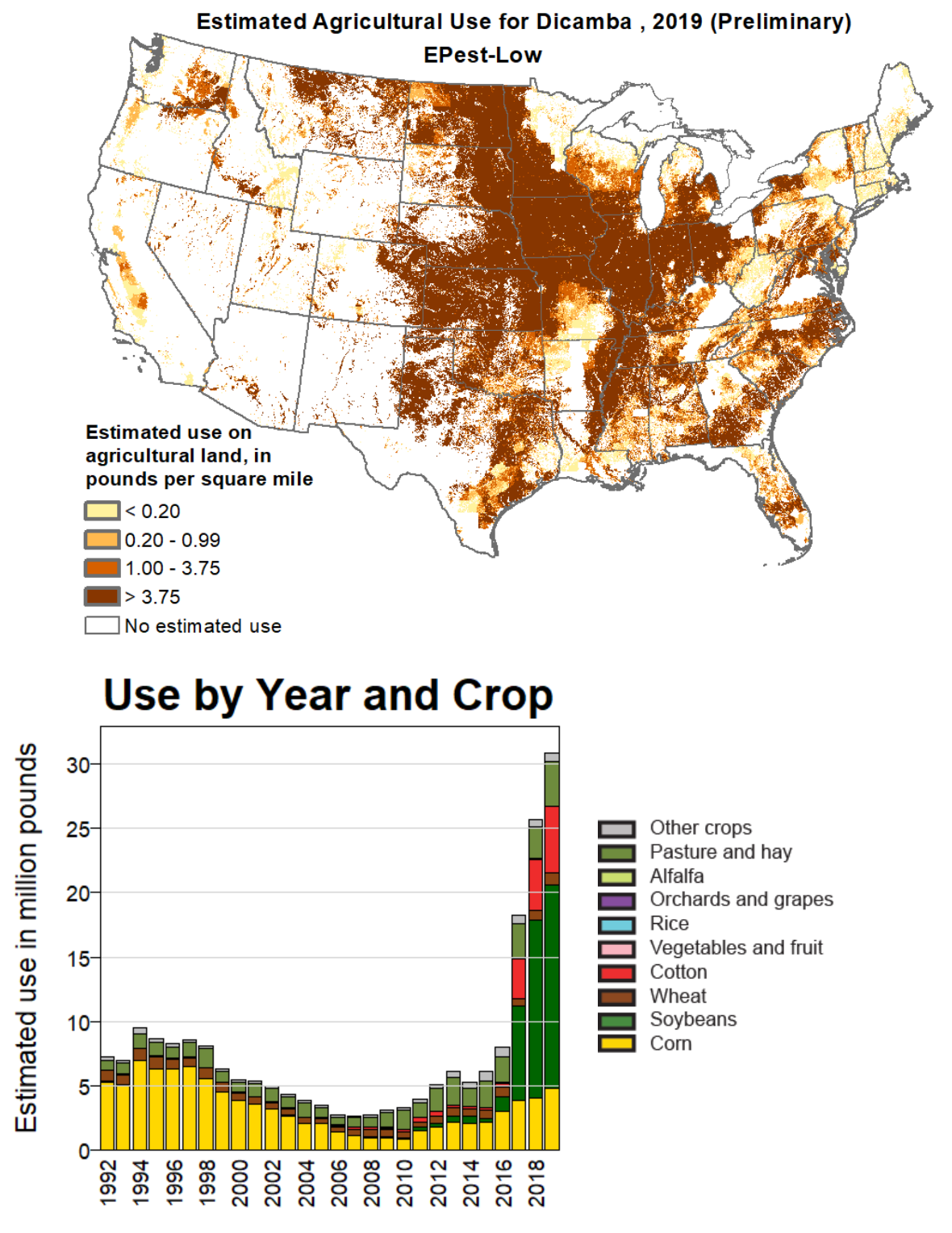
Dicamba use in the U.S. in 2019. Usage has substantially increased since dicamba was approved for use over dicamba-resistant GMO crops in 2016.

Dicamba is a selective and systemic herbicide that kills annual and perennial broadleaf weeds. Its primary commercial applications are weed control for grain crops and turf areas. It is also used to control brush and bracken in pastures, as well as controlling legumes and cacti. In combination with a phenoxy herbicide or with other herbicides, dicamba can be used for weed control in range land and other noncrop areas (fence rows, roadways, railways, pipelines, transmission lines and wastage). Dicamba is toxic to conifer species but is in general less toxic to grasses. Dicamba is a synthetic auxin that functions by increasing plant growth rate, leading to senescence and cell death.

The growth regulating properties of dicamba were first discovered by Zimmerman and Hitchcock in 1942. Soon after, Jealott's Hill Experimental Station in England was evaluating dicamba in the field. Dicamba has since been used for household and commercial weed control.

Increasing use of dicamba has been reported with the release of dicamba-resistant genetically modified plants by Monsanto. In October 2016, the EPA launched a criminal investigation into the illegal application of older, drift prone formulations of dicamba onto these new plants. Older formulations have been reported to drift after application and affect other crops not meant to be treated. A less volatile formulation of dicamba made by Monsanto, designed to be less prone to vaporizing and inhibit unintended drift between fields, was approved for use in the United States by the EPA in 2016, and was commercially available in 2017. As a result, the use of dicamba in U.S. agriculture rose sharply from approximately 8,000,000 pounds (3,600,000 kg) in 2016 to 30,000,000 pounds (14,000,000 kg) in 2019, according to the U.S. Geological Survey.

== Drift ==
Dicamba came under scrutiny due to its reputation for drifting from treated fields onto neighboring crops. In 2011, the European Food Safety Authority identified dicamba's potential for long-range transport through the atmosphere as a critical area of concern. In 2022, the United States Environmental Protection Agency identified spray drift as the primary ecological risk for dicamba due to its potential effects on non-target terrestrial plants. Dicamba is also available in a drift-resistant formulation, which is less likely to affect neighboring fields.

== Toxicology ==
=== Humans ===
In 2022 the EPA identified potential occupational risks to handlers mixing and loading dry flowable formulations for application to sod and field crops. The Agency did not identify dietary, residential, aggregate, or post-application risks of concern.

Increased lung and colon cancer rate ratios and positive exposure–response patterns were reported for dicamba, in a review of data gathered in the National Institutes of Health's Agricultural Health Study. The Cross-Canada Study of Pesticides and Health found that exposure to dicamba increased the risk of non-Hodgkins lymphoma in men.

=== Mammals ===
Dicamba has low toxicity by ingestion and inhalation or dermal exposure (oral LD_{50} in rats: 757 mg/kg body weight, dermal LD_{50} in rats: >2,000 mg/kg, inhalation LC_{50} in rats: >200 mg/L). In a three-generation study, dicamba did not affect the reproductive capacity of rats.

When rabbits were given doses of 0, 0.5, 1, 3, 10, or 20 (mg/kg)/day of technical dicamba from days 6 through 18 of pregnancy, toxic effects on the mothers, slightly reduced fetal body weights, and increased loss of fetuses occurred at the 10 mg/kg dose. U.S. Environmental Protection Agency (EPA) has set the NOAEL for this study at 3 (mg/kg)/day.

In dog tests, some enlargement of liver cells has occurred, but a similar effect has not been shown in humans.

=== Aquatic animals ===
Dicamba and its derivatives are practically nontoxic to aquatic invertebrates. Studies suggest that dicamba should be considered to be a potential endocrine disruptor for fish at environmentally relevant concentrations.

=== Birds and bees ===
The 2022 EPA draft ecological risk assessment identified potential adverse effects to birds, and bee larvae for all dicamba uses.

== Genetically modified crops ==
The soil bacterium Pseudomonas maltophilia (strain DI-6) converts dicamba to 3,6-dichlorosalicylic acid (3,6-DCSA), which lacks herbicidal activity. The enzymes responsible for this first breakdown step comprise a three-component system called dicamba O-demethylase.

In the 2000s, Monsanto incorporated one component of the three enzymes into the genome of soybean, cotton, and other broadleaf crop plants, making them resistant to dicamba. Monsanto has marketed their dicamba resistant crops under the brand name Xtend.

Farmers have expressed concern about being forced to grow resistant crops as protection against drifting dicamba.

== Resistance ==
Herbicide resistance after the introduction of resistant crops is a common concern with herbicide. In the laboratory, researchers have demonstrated weed resistance to dicamba within three generations of exposure. This effect is illustrated by glyphosate-resistant crops (marketed as 'Roundup Ready'). The weed species Amaranthus palmeri and Bassia scoparia developed resistance to dicamba already in the 1990s.

Dicamba's HRAC resistance class is Group I (Aus), Group O (Global), Group 4 (numeric).

== Environmental fate ==
Pathway for biodegradation of dicamba

Dicamba is poorly soluble in water. A study conducted from 1991 to 1996 by the U.S. Geologic Survey found dicamba in 0.13% of the groundwaters surveyed. The maximum level detected was 0.0021 mg/L.

It is biodegraded by both aerobic and anaerobic bacteria to 3,6-dichlorosalicylic acid. This conversion is catalyzed by a dicamba monooxygenase, which hydroxylates the methyl group of dicamba. The hydroxymethylated derivative hydrolyzes readily to an inactive dichlorosalicylic acid or its conjugate base. Modification of the gene encoding this enzyme is one strategy toward dicamba-resistant crops. The dichlorosalicylic acid is far less toxic than dicamba, which is already rather low.

== Use on dicamba-tolerant crops ==
Complaints against dicamba accelerated after the United States EPA approved a Monsanto-created soybean which could tolerate it in 2016. The soybean was a part of Monsanto's Xtend products. Dicamba was approved by the EPA for "over-the-top" (OTT) use on those dicamba-tolerant soybean and cotton crops. In 2017 and again in 2018, EPA amended the registrations of all OTT dicamba products following reports that farmers had experienced crop damage and economic losses resulting from spray drifting.

Arkansas and Missouri banned the sale and use of dicamba in July 2017 in response to complaints of crop damage due to drift. Monsanto responded by arguing that not all instances of crop damage had been investigated and a ban was premature. Monsanto sued the state of Arkansas to stop the ban, but the case was dismissed in February 2018. It has also been acknowledged that the use of dicamba had increased since 2017.

In June 2020, the 9th U.S. Circuit Court of Appeals blocked sales of three dicamba-based herbicides in the United States, finding that the Environmental Protection Agency "substantially understated risks that it acknowledged and failed entirely to acknowledge other risks." The EPA's Office of the Inspector General concluded that the EPA had deviated from typical procedures in its 2018 decision despite the best efforts of EPA's career scientists and managers to recommend a different approach that was scientifically, procedurally, and legally sound.

On 8 June 2020, the EPA clarified that existing stocks of the dicamba-based pesticides bought before 3 June 2020 may be used according to their previous labels until 31 July 2020. In October 2020 the EPA issued a decision on the registration application of three dicamba-based products, Xtendimax, Engenia, and Tavium. They approved of their use from 2021 to 2025 with some additional changes, including labeling restrictions.

Despite the control measures implemented by the EPA in 2020, the 2021 incident reports showed little change in the number, severity, and/or geographic extent of dicamba-related incidents. In March 2022 and in February 2023, EPA approved additional labeling to further restrict use of OTT dicamba to reduce the likelihood of volatility and offsite movement of OTT dicamba by avoiding application on days with high temperatures. The restrictions apply to Minnesota, Iowa, Illinois, Indiana, and South Dakota.

After a court-ordered ban for the 2025 growing season, the US EPA reinstated dicamba use for use in dicamba-tolerant soybeans and cotton for 2026 and 2027 with additional restrictions in formulations and use requirements intended to reduce drift risk. Formulation requirements included reducing the maximum amount of dicamba allowed to be used each year and having higher concentrations of drift-reducing additives. Individual dicamba products used on dicamba-tolerant crops would still need to be approved by individual states.

== Lawsuits ==
In February 2018, it was reported that numerous farmers from 21 states had filed lawsuits against Monsanto alleging that dicamba damaged their crops, with the most prominent cases coming from Missouri and Arkansas. By August 2019, more lawsuits were filed, alleging that dicamba had damaged crops, gardens, and trees of neighbors of the farmers who used it.

On 27 January 2020, the first trial concerning dicamba-related products began in Cape Girardeau, Missouri. The lawsuit involves a peach farmer who alleged that dicamba-based herbicides caused significant damage to his crops and trees. It had also been filed in November 2016, when dicamba was still owned by Monsanto. On 14 February 2020, the jury involved in the lawsuit ruled against dicamba owner Bayer and its co-defendant BASF and found in favor of the peach grower, Bader Farms owner Bill Bader. Bayer and BASF were also ordered to pay Bader $15 million in damages. On 15 February 2020, Monsanto and BASF were ordered to pay an additional $250 million in punitive damages. Court documents revealed Monsanto had used dicamba drift as a sales pitch to convince farmers to buy their proprietary dicamba-resistant seeds or face devastated crops.

On 17 February, it was announced that dicamba would face many more lawsuits. On 26 February, the Peiffer Wolf Carr & Kane Law Firm announced that after the Bader verdict, more than 2,000 U.S. farmers hired the law firm to represent them in upcoming lawsuits.

In June 2020, Bayer agreed to a settlement of up to $400 million for all 2015–2020 crop year dicamba claims, not including the $250 million judgement. On 25 November 2020, U.S. District Judge Stephen Limbaugh Jr. reduced the punitive damage amount in the Bader Farms case to $60 million.
