= Ortho-Vanillin =

ortho-Vanillin

Names
- Preferred IUPAC name 2-Hydroxy-3-methoxybenzaldehyde
- Other names o-Vanillin; 3-Methoxysalicylaldehyde

Identifiers
CAS Number	148-53-8
3D model (JSmol)	Interactive image
ChEBI	CHEBI:78339
ChEMBL	ChEMBL13859
ChemSpider	21105848
ECHA InfoCard	100.005.197
PubChem CID	8991
UNII	008LR748FI
CompTox Dashboard (EPA)	DTXSID5022011
- InChI: InChI=1S/C8H8O3/c1-11-7-4-2-3-6(5-9)8(7)10/h2-5,10H,1H3 Key: JJVNINGBHGBWJH-UHFFFAOYSA-N
- SMILES: Oc1c(cccc1OC)C=O

Properties
Chemical formula	C_{8}H_{8}O_{3}
Molar mass	152.15 g/mol
Appearance	Yellow, fibrous solid
Density	1.231 g/mL
Melting point	40 to 42 °C (104 to 108 °F; 313 to 315 K)
Boiling point	265 to 266 °C (509 to 511 °F; 538 to 539 K)

Hazards
- Occupational safety and health (OHS/OSH)
Main hazards	May cause irritation to skin, eyes, and respiratory tract
- GHS labelling
Pictograms	(GHS05: Corrosive) (GHS07: Exclamation mark)
Signal word	Danger
Hazard statements	H302, H315, H317, H318, H319, H335
Precautionary statements	P261, P264, P270, P271, P272, P280, P301+P312, P302+P352, P304+P340, P305+P351+P338, P310, P312, P321, P330, P332+P313, P333+P313, P337+P313, P362, P363, P403+P233, P405, P501
Flash point	> 110 °C (230 °F; 383 K)
Safety data sheet (SDS)	External MSDS

Related compounds
Related compounds	Eugenol, Anisaldehyde, Phenol, Vanillin
- Except where otherwise noted, data are given for materials in their standard state (at 25 °C [77 °F], 100 kPa). verify (what is ?) Infobox references

ortho-Vanillin (2-hydroxy-3-methoxybenzaldehyde) is an organic solid present in the extracts and essential oils of many plants. Its functional groups include aldehyde, ether and phenol. ortho-Vanillin, a compound of the formula C_{8}H_{8}O_{3}, is distinctly different from its more prevalent isomer, para-vanillin. The "ortho-" prefix refers to the position of the compound’s hydroxyl moiety, which is found in the para-position in vanillin.

ortho-Vanillin is a fibrous, light-yellow, crystalline solid. Present in a variety of food products, it is not specifically sought after, and is therefore a less-commonly produced and encountered food additive.

== History ==
ortho-Vanillin was first isolated, in 1876, by renowned German chemist Ferdinand Tiemann. By 1910, methods for its purification had been developed by Francis Noelting, who similarly demonstrated its versatility as a general synthetic precursor for a diverse array of compounds, such as the coumarins.

By 1920, the compound began to show use as a dye for hides.

== Biological properties ==
ortho-Vanillin is harmful if ingested, irritating to eyes, skin and respiratory system, but has an unmistakable high LD_{50} of 1330 mg/kg in mice.

It is a weak inhibitor of tyrosinase, and displays both antimutagenic and comutagenic properties in Escherichia coli. However, its net effect makes it a “potent comutagen”.

ortho-Vanillin possesses moderate antifungal and antibacterial properties.

== Uses ==
Today, most ortho-vanillin is used in the study of mutagenesis and as a synthetic precursor for pharmaceuticals, for example, benafentrine and an antiandrogen compound called Pentomone.

== See also ==
- Vanillin
- 2-Hydroxy-5-methoxybenzaldehyde
- Isovanillin
- 2-Hydroxy-4-methoxybenzaldehyde
