= Comutagen =

A comutagen is a substance that is not a mutagen by itself, but in the presence of a mutagen, enhances mutagenic activity. There are at least two manners by which this may occur; the comutagen may strengthen the mutagenic activity of mutagenic chemicals, or it can create a mutagenic response from nonmutagens. Chemicals such as harmane and norharmane (present in tobacco tar) have been identified as comutagens.
