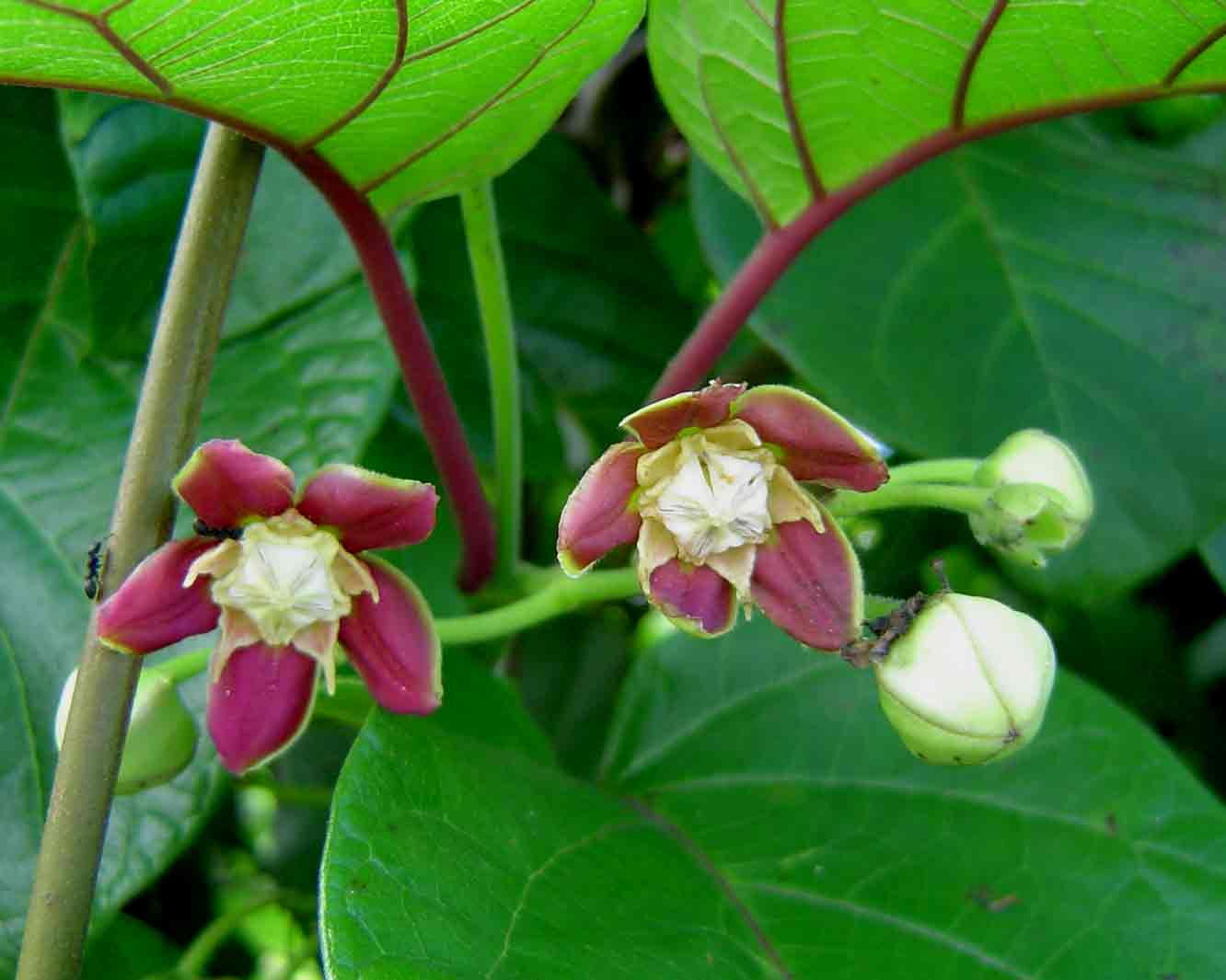

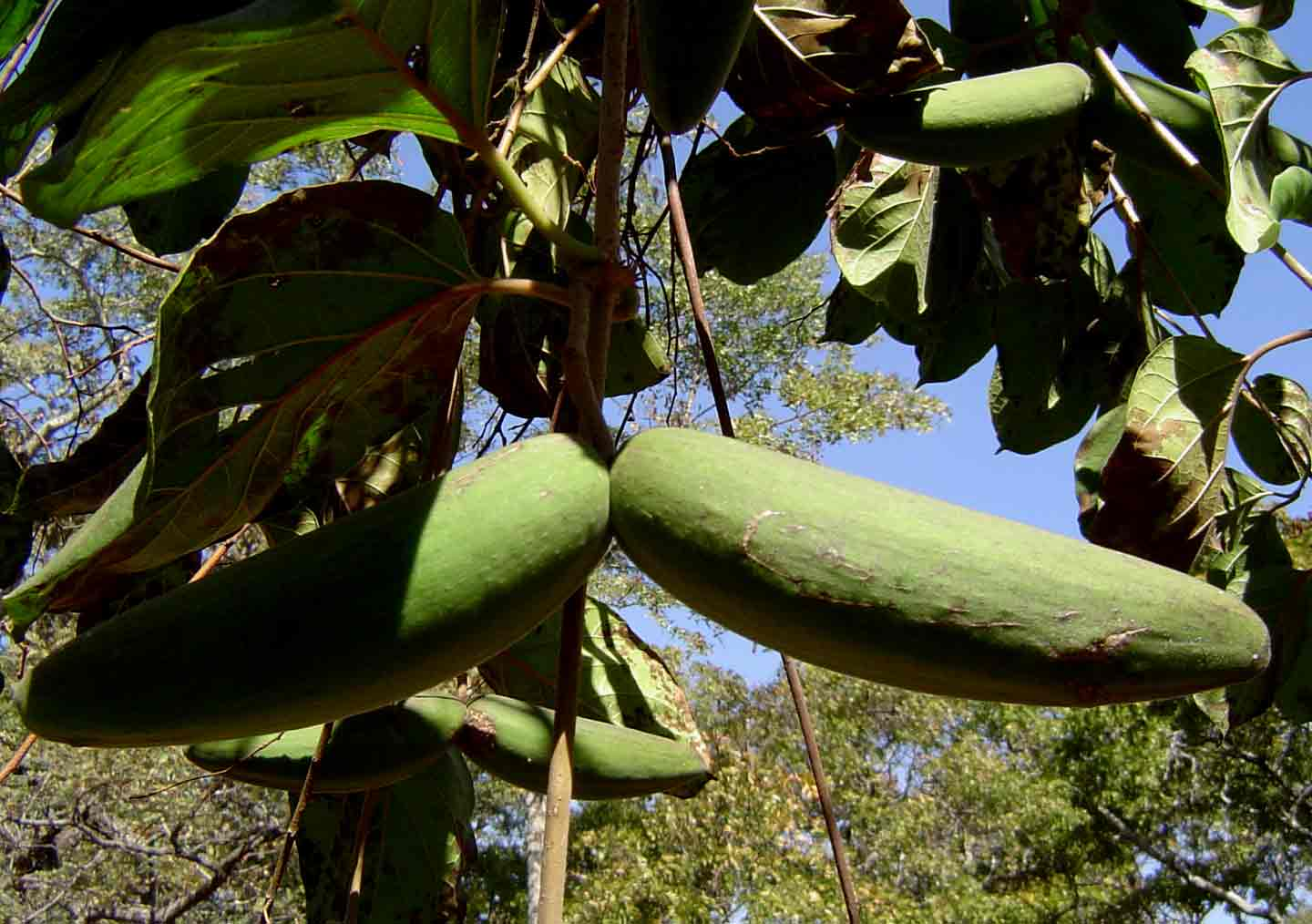

Scientific classification
- Kingdom: Plantae
- Clade: Tracheophytes
- Clade: Angiosperms
- Clade: Eudicots
- Clade: Asterids
- Order: Gentianales
- Family: Apocynaceae
- Genus: Mondia
- Species: M. whitei

Binomial name
- Mondia whitei (Hook.f.) Skeels

Synonyms
- Chlorocodon whitei Hook. f.; Chlorocodon whiteii Hook. f.

= Mondia whitei =

Species of flowering plant

Mondia whitei is a perennial herbaceous/woody climber belonging to the family Apocynaceae, and as with most members of this family, has milky latex. Two species of Mondia are recognised, the other being Mondia ecornuta. Known in Chichewa as 'gondolosi', in Kenya it is known as 'mukombero', the rootstock is often collected for medicinal use. It occurs at elevations of 1000 – 1500 m in moist to wet forests, and even in swampy grassland, across Sub-Saharan Africa; it is recorded from Guinea, Nigeria, Cameroon, the Sudan, Uganda, Kenya, Tanzania, Zimbabwe, Malawi, Mozambique, South Africa, Eswatini, and Angola. In Kenya its roots are heavily collected, and this often kills the plant. Some initiatives propagate the species to supply the commercial demand and attempt to re-establish the species in the wild.

With older stems becoming woody, it grows from a tuberous rootstock which has a ginger or liquorice taste and an aroma reminiscent of vanilla. The major component of the essential oil of the roots is the fragrant phenolic compound 2-hydroxy-4-methoxybenzaldehyde, a positional isomer of vanillin.

The opposite leaves are large (100–300 x 50–150 mm) with a cordate base and 30–55 mm long petioles which, with the lower-surface veins, are often reddish-purple. The false stipules are large and fimbriaceous. The inflorescence is axillary and branched, flowers are short-lived, lasting 3–4 days. Petals are reddish-purple, ± 14 mm long and with a green edge. The flowers are unusually large for the subfamily Periplocoideae, and have a malodorous fruity scent which grows as the day progresses. The paired large fruits or follicles (75–100 x 44 mm) are semi-woody with a velvety surface.

Mondia is from the Zulu words for the plant, 'umondi', 'mondi' or 'mundi'. The species epithet commemorates A.S. White, a South African farmer, who sent specimens to Kew to John Croumbie Brown, Colonial Botanist at the Cape, who sent them on to Joseph Dalton Hooker, who described the species.

== Gallery ==
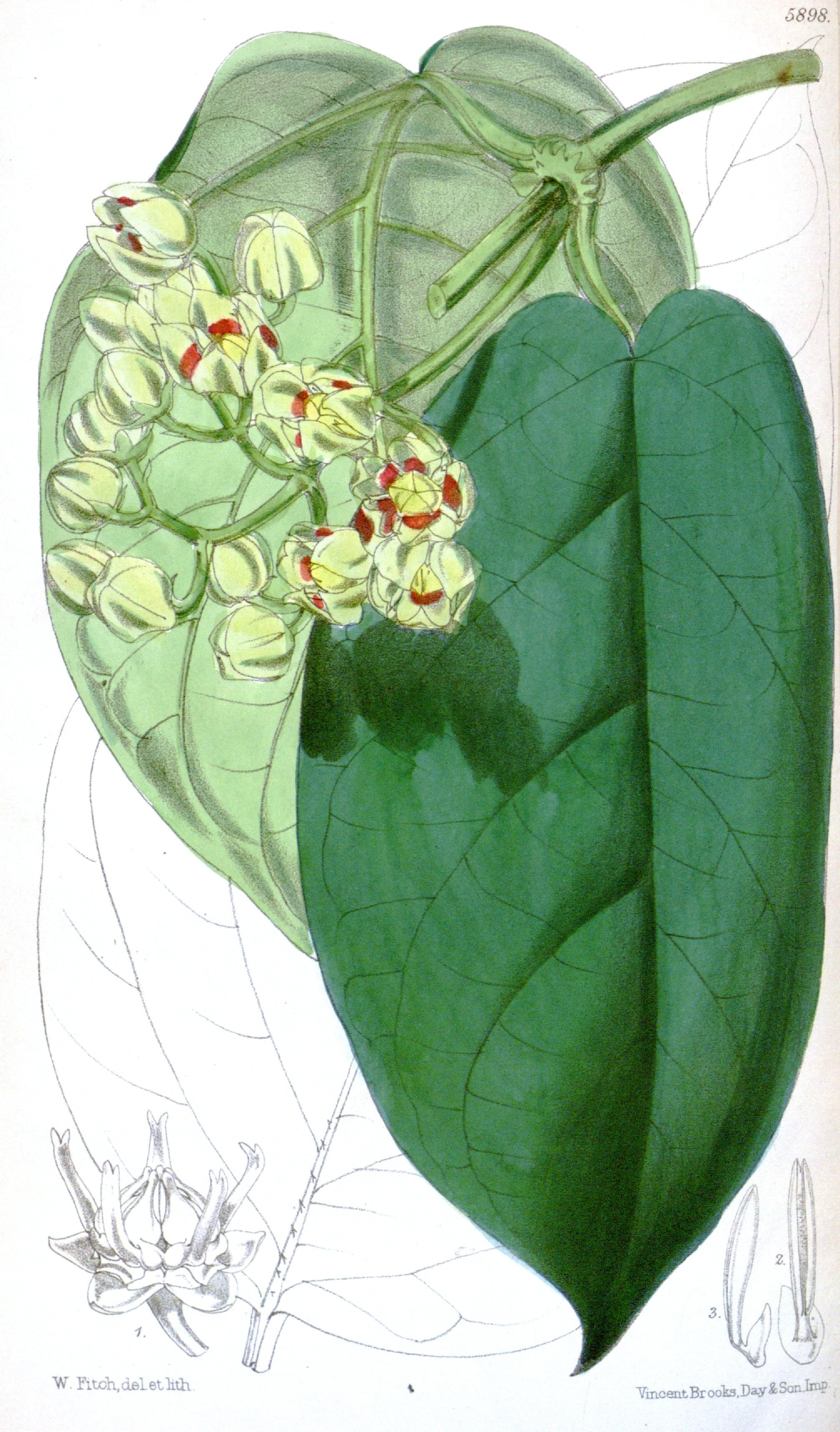

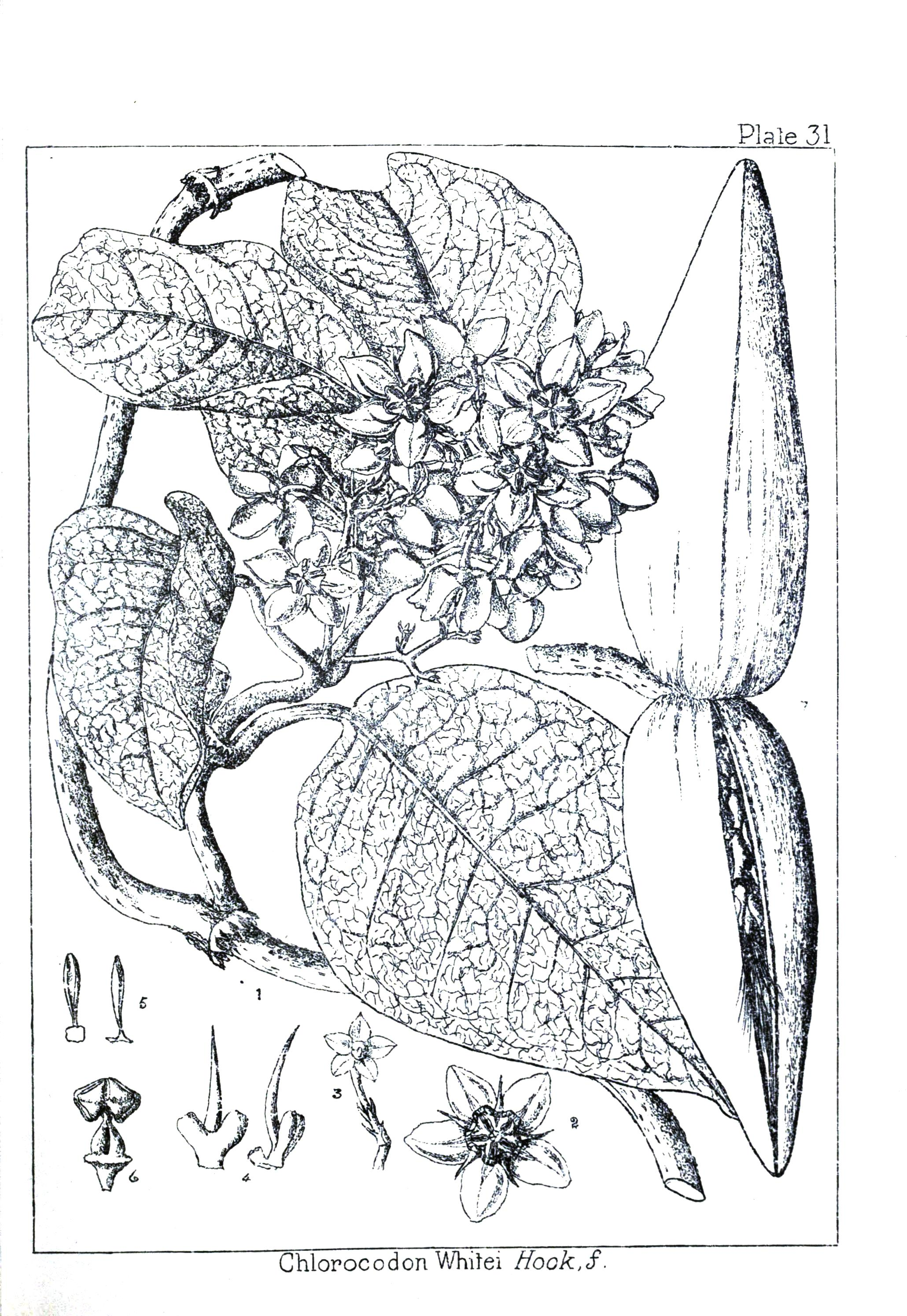

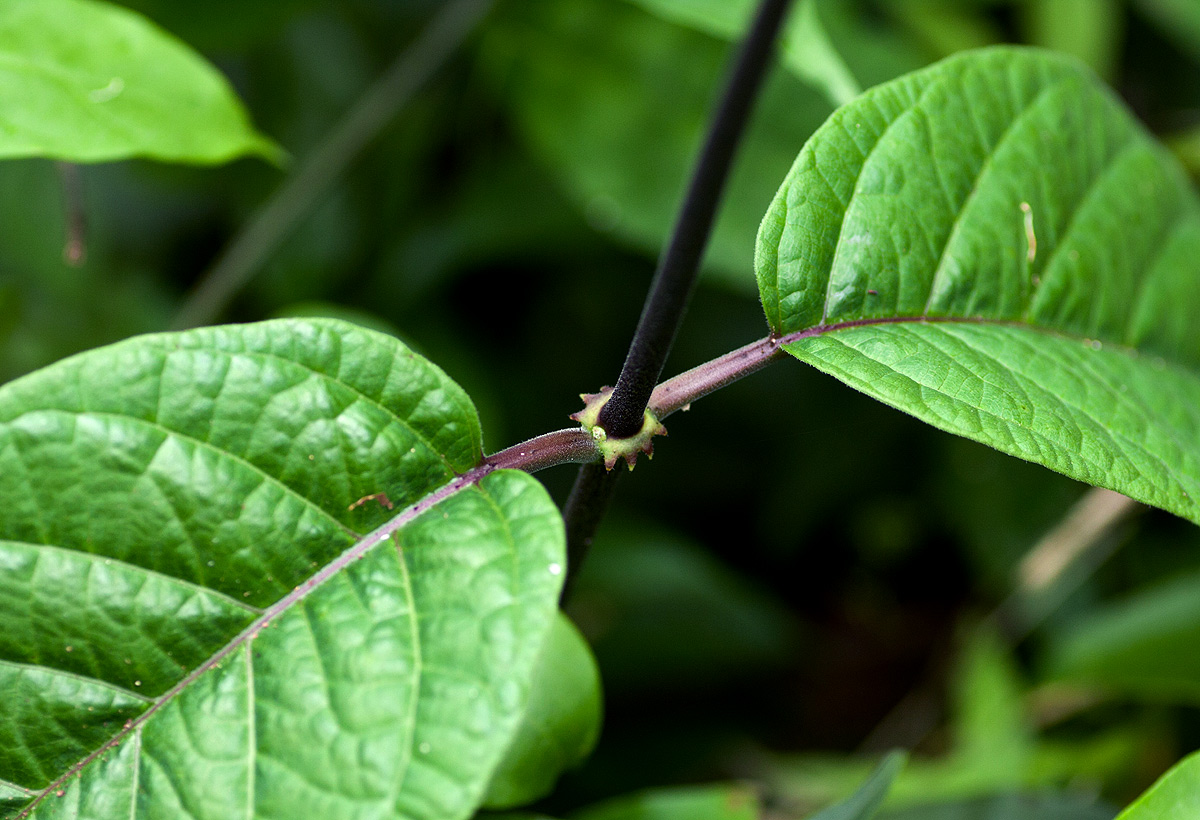

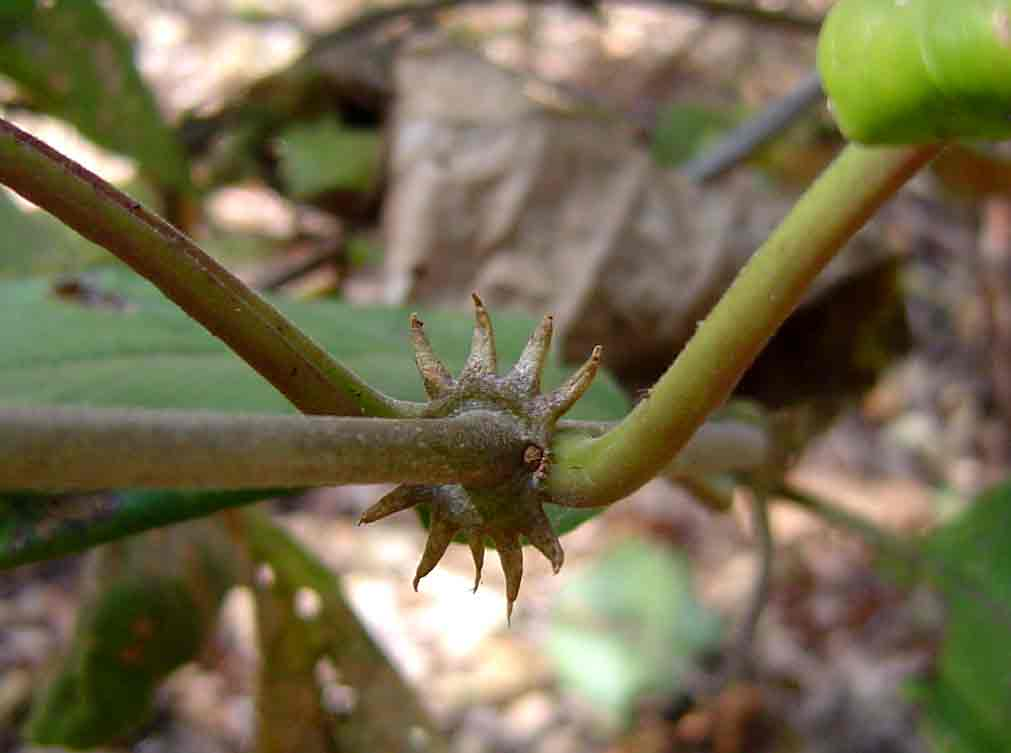
