= 2-Hydroxy-4-methoxybenzaldehyde =

Names
- Preferred IUPAC name 2-Hydroxy-4-methoxybenzaldehyde
- Other names 4-Methoxysalicylaldehyde

Identifiers
| CAS Number | 673-22-3 |
| 3D model (JSmol) | Interactive image |
| ChemSpider | 62803 |
| ECHA InfoCard | 100.010.550 |
| PubChem CID | 69600 |
| UNII | 2N395P88LW |
| CompTox Dashboard (EPA) | DTXSID1060970 |
- InChI: InChI=1S/C8H8O3/c1-11-7-3-2-6(5-9)8(10)4-7/h2-5,10H,1H3 Key: WZUODJNEIXSNEU-UHFFFAOYSA-N
- SMILES: COC1=CC(=C(C=C1)C=O)O

Properties
| Chemical formula | C_{8}H_{8}O_{3} |
| Molar mass | 152.149 g·mol^{−1} |
- Except where otherwise noted, data are given for materials in their standard state (at 25 °C [77 °F], 100 kPa). Infobox references

2-Hydroxy-4-methoxybenzaldehyde is a chemical compound and a positional isomer of vanillin.

A fragrant phenolic compound found as a major constituent of the essential oils of the root bark and stem bark of some members of the subfamily Periplocoideae of the plant family Apocynaceae. These include the roots of Decalepis hamiltonii, Decalepis salicifolia, Hemidesmus indicus, Mondia whitei, Periploca angustifolia, Periploca sepium and Zygostelma benthamii and the stem bark of Periploca graeca. Some of these plants also contain toxic cardenolides.

Urolithin M7, one of the urolithins, has also been synthesized from 2-hydroxy-4-methoxybenzaldehyde using the inverse electron-demand Diels–Alder reaction.

== See also ==
- Vanillin
- 2-Hydroxy-5-methoxybenzaldehyde
- Isovanillin
- ortho-Vanillin
