= Isovanillin =

- Skeletal formula of isovanillin with some implicit hydrogens shown and an added explicit hydrogen

Names
- Preferred IUPAC name 3-Hydroxy-4-methoxybenzaldehyde
- Other names 5-Formylguaiacol 3-Hydroxy-p-anisaldehyde; 3-Hydroxy-4-methoxybenzaldehyde Isovanilline

Identifiers
CAS Number	621-59-0
3D model (JSmol)	Interactive image; Interactive image
Beilstein Reference	1073021
ChEBI	CHEBI:193161
ChEMBL	ChEMBL275563
ChemSpider	11629
ECHA InfoCard	100.009.724
EC Number	210-694-9
MeSH	Isovanillin
PubChem CID	12127
RTECS number	CU6540000
UNII	4A9N90H9X6
CompTox Dashboard (EPA)	DTXSID7049423
- InChI: InChI=1S/C8H8O3/c1-11-8-3-2-6(5-9)4-7(8)10/h2-5,10H,1H3 Key: JVTZFYYHCGSXJV-UHFFFAOYSA-N
- SMILES: COC1=CC=C(C=O)C=C1O; COC1=C(C=C(C=C1)C=O)O

Properties
Chemical formula	C_{8}H_{8}O_{3}
Molar mass	152.149 g·mol^{−1}
Appearance	Translucent crystals
Melting point	113 to 116 °C (235 to 241 °F; 386 to 389 K)
Boiling point	179 °C (354 °F; 452 K) at 15 mmHg
log P	1.25
Acidity (pK_{a})	9.248

Related compounds
Related compounds	Anisaldehyde Eugenol; Phenol; Vanillin
- Except where otherwise noted, data are given for materials in their standard state (at 25 °C [77 °F], 100 kPa). Infobox references

Isovanillin is a phenolic aldehyde, an organic compound and isomer of vanillin. It is a selective inhibitor of aldehyde oxidase. It is not a substrate of that enzyme, and is metabolized by aldehyde dehydrogenase into isovanillic acid, which could make it a candidate drug for use in alcohol aversion therapy. Isovanillin can be used as a precursor in the chemical total synthesis of morphine. The proposed metabolism of isovanillin (and vanillin) in rat has been described in literature, and is part of the WikiPathways machine readable pathway collection.

== See also ==
- Vanillin
- 2-Hydroxy-5-methoxybenzaldehyde
- ortho-Vanillin
- 2-Hydroxy-4-methoxybenzaldehyde
