= O-Anisic acid =

o-Anisic acid

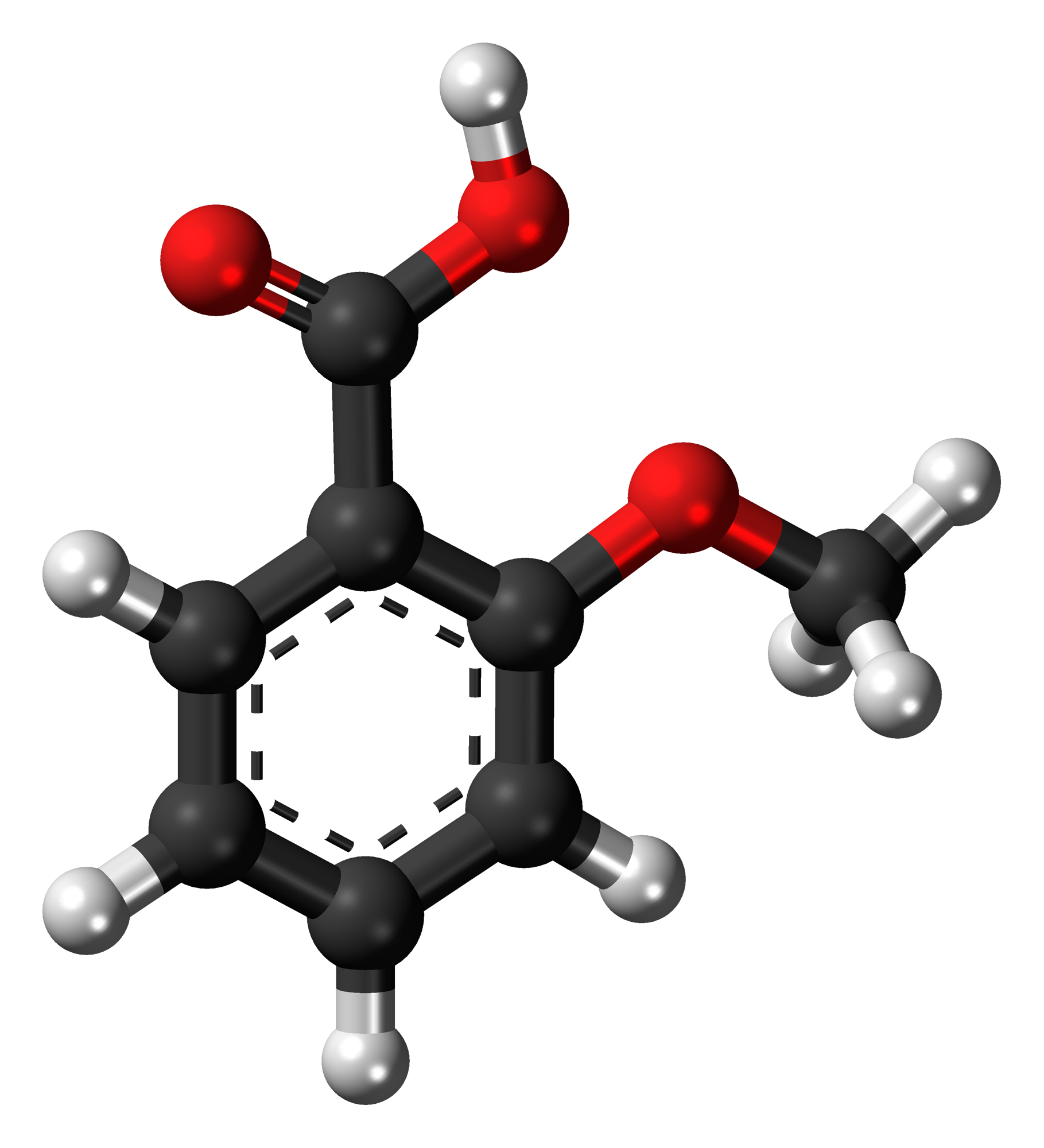

Names
- Preferred IUPAC name 2-Methoxybenzoic acid
- Other names o-Anisic acid, ortho-methoxybenzoic acid, 2-methoxybenzoic acid

Identifiers
CAS Number	579-75-9
3D model (JSmol)	Interactive image
ChEBI	CHEBI:421840
ChemSpider	10892
ECHA InfoCard	100.008.590
PubChem CID	11370
UNII	49WA6Z7GZA
CompTox Dashboard (EPA)	DTXSID3060376
- InChI: InChI=1S/C8H8O3/c1-11-7-5-3-2-4-6(7)8(9)10/h2-5H,1H3,(H,9,10) Key: ILUJQPXNXACGAN-UHFFFAOYSA-N
- SMILES: COc1ccccc1C(=O)O

Properties
Chemical formula	C_{8}H_{8}O_{3}
Molar mass	152.15 g/mol
Melting point	101 to 103 °C (214 to 217 °F; 374 to 376 K)
Acidity (pK_{a})	4.09
- Except where otherwise noted, data are given for materials in their standard state (at 25 °C [77 °F], 100 kPa). Infobox references

o-Anisic acid is an organic compound with the formula CH_{3}OC_{6}H_{4}CO_{2}H. A colorless solid, it is one of the isomers of anisic acid.

The compound has been well studied with respect to intramolecular hydrogen bonding and as a substrate for various catalystic reactions.
