= 2-Hydroxy-5-methoxybenzaldehyde =

Organic compound and isomer of vanillin

Names
- Preferred IUPAC name 2-Hydroxy-5-methoxybenzaldehyde
- Other names 5-Methoxysalicylaldehyde; 2-Formyl-4-methoxyphenol; 6-Hydroxy-m-anisaldehyde

Identifiers
CAS Number	672-13-9
3D model (JSmol)	Interactive image
ChemSpider	21168855
ECHA InfoCard	100.010.537
EC Number	211-589-0
PubChem CID	24848799
UNII	GYT2Q9UR3W
CompTox Dashboard (EPA)	DTXSID40217478
- InChI: InChI=1S/C9H10O3/c1-11-8-3-4-9(12-2)7(5-8)6-10/h3-6H,1-2H3 Key: FZHSPPYCNDYIKD-UHFFFAOYSA-N; InChI=1S/C8H8O3/c1-11-7-2-3-8(10)6(4-7)5-9/h2-5,10H,1H3 Key: AFUKNJHPZAVHGQ-UHFFFAOYAN
- SMILES: COC1=CC(=C(C=C1)O)C=O

Properties
Chemical formula	C_{8}H_{8}O_{3}
Molar mass	152.149 g·mol^{−1}
Appearance	Yellow to yellow-green liquid
Density	1.219 g/mL
Melting point	4 °C (39 °F; 277 K)
Boiling point	250 °C (482 °F; 523 K)
Refractive index (n_{D})	1.578
- Except where otherwise noted, data are given for materials in their standard state (at 25 °C [77 °F], 100 kPa). verify (what is ?) Infobox references

2-Hydroxy-5-methoxybenzaldehyde is an organic compound and an isomer of vanillin.

== Synthesis and reactions ==
The chemical is produced by the Reimer-Tiemann reaction on 4-methoxyphenol with a 79% yield.

It reacts with malononitrile to form 2-imino-6-methoxy-2H-1-benzopyran-3-carbonitrile. It can be reduced by sodium borohydride in ethanol to form 2-hydroxy-5-methoxybenzyl alcohol.

== See also ==
- Vanillin
- Isovanillin
- ortho-Vanillin
- 2-Hydroxy-4-methoxybenzaldehyde
