= Chlorosalicylic acid =

Chlorosalicylic acid may refer to:

- 3-Chlorosalicylic acid, RN = 1829-32-9, m.p. 180-182 °C
- 4-Chlorosalicylic acid, RN = 5106-98-9, m.p. 211 °C
- 5-Chlorosalicylic acid, RN = 321-14-2, m.p. 171.5 °C
- 6-Chlorosalicylic acid, RN = 56961-31-0, m.p. 171.5-172.5 °C

All have the formula ClC_{6}H_{3}(OH)CO_{2}H, where the OH group occupies the position on the ring next to the CO_{2}H group.

== See also ==
- Dichlorosalicylic acid
