= Anisic acid =

Anisic acid or methoxybenzoic acid is an organic compound which is a carboxylic acid. It exists in three forms, depending on arene substitution patterns:

- p-Anisic acid (4-methoxybenzoic acid)
- m-Anisic acid (3-methoxybenzoic acid)
- o-Anisic acid (2-methoxybenzoic acid)
