= 6-Methylsalicylic acid =

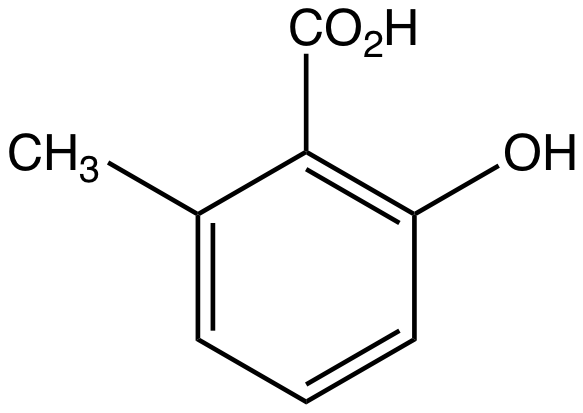

Names
- Preferred IUPAC name 2-Hydroxy-6-methylbenzoic acid
- Other names 2-Hydroxy-6-methylbenzoic acid o-Cresotic acid 2,6-Cresotic acid o-Cresotinic acid 2-Hydroxy-o-toluic acid

Identifiers
CAS Number	567-61-3
3D model (JSmol)	Interactive image
Beilstein Reference	2208693
ChEBI	CHEBI:17637
ChEMBL	ChEMBL510026
ChemSpider	10805
ECHA InfoCard	100.259.902
KEGG	C02657
PubChem CID	11279
UNII	L5352FE23Y
CompTox Dashboard (EPA)	DTXSID20205257
- InChI: InChI=1S/C8H8O3/c1-5-3-2-4-6(9)7(5)8(10)11/h2-4,9H,1H3,(H,10,11) Key: HCJMNOSIAGSZBM-UHFFFAOYSA-N
- SMILES: CC1=C(C(=CC=C1)O)C(=O)O

Properties
Chemical formula	C_{8}H_{8}O_{3}
Molar mass	152.149 g·mol^{−1}
Appearance	white solid
Melting point	141.5–142 °C (286.7–287.6 °F; 414.6–415.1 K)
- Except where otherwise noted, data are given for materials in their standard state (at 25 °C [77 °F], 100 kPa). Infobox references

6-Methylsalicylic acid is an organic compound with the formula CH_{3}C_{6}H_{3}(CO_{2}H)(OH). It is a white solid that is soluble in basic water and in polar organic solvents. At neutral pH, the acid exists as 6-methylsalicylate. Its functional groups include a carboxylic acid and a phenol group. It is one of four isomers of methylsalicylic acid.

It occurs naturally, being a biosynthetic precursor to m-cresol. Its decarboxylation is catalyzed by 6-methylsalicylate decarboxylase:

6-methylsalicylate ⇌ m-cresol + CO_{2}

== See also ==
- 5-Methylsalicylic acid
- 4-Methylsalicylic acid
- 3-Methylsalicylic acid
