= 4-Methylsalicylic acid =

Names
- Preferred IUPAC name 2-Hydroxy-4-methylbenzoic acid
- Other names m-Cresotic acid 2,4-Cresotic acid m-Cresotinic acid 2-Hydroxy-p-toluic acid

Identifiers
CAS Number	50-85-1
3D model (JSmol)	Interactive image
ChEBI	CHEBI:20450
ChemSpider	5584
ECHA InfoCard	100.000.063
EC Number	200-068-3
KEGG	C14103
PubChem CID	5788
UNII	4H0106V3D3
CompTox Dashboard (EPA)	DTXSID30198166
- InChI: InChI=1S/C8H8O3/c1-5-2-3-6(8(10)11)7(9)4-5/h2-4,9H,1H3,(H,10,11) Key: NJESAXZANHETJV-UHFFFAOYSA-N; InChI=1/C8H8O3/c1-5-2-3-6(8(10)11)7(9)4-5/h2-4,9H,1H3,(H,10,11) Key: NJESAXZANHETJV-UHFFFAOYAQ
- SMILES: CC1=CC(=C(C=C1)C(=O)O)O

Properties
Chemical formula	C_{8}H_{8}O_{3}
Molar mass	152.149 g·mol^{−1}
Appearance	white solid
Melting point	177 °C (351 °F; 450 K)
- Except where otherwise noted, data are given for materials in their standard state (at 25 °C [77 °F], 100 kPa). Infobox references

4-Methylsalicylic acid is an organic compound with the formula CH_{3}C_{6}H_{3}(CO_{2}H)(OH). It is a white solid that is soluble in basic water and in polar organic solvents. Its functional groups include a carboxylic acid and a phenol group. It is one of four isomers of methylsalicylic acid, including the naturally occurring 6-methylsalicylic acid. The compound has few applications. It is produced by carboxylation of sodium para-cresolate: CH_{3}C_{6}H_{4}ONa + CO_{2} → CH_{3}C_{6}H_{3}(CO_{2}Na)OH

It has been prepared by hydroxylation of 4-methylbenzoic acid.

== See also ==
- 3-Methylsalicylic acid
- 6-Methylsalicylic acid
