= 3-Methylsalicylic acid =

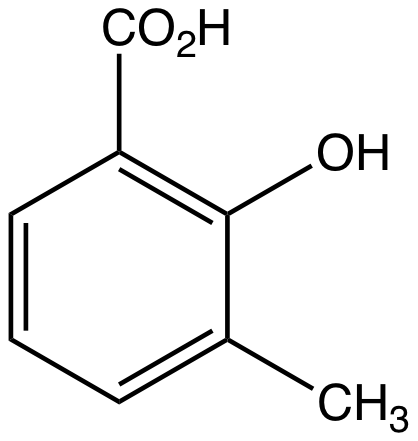

Names
- Preferred IUPAC name 2-Hydroxy-3-methylbenzoic acid
- Other names 2,3-Cresotic acid o-Cresotinic acid 2-Hydroxy-m-toluic acid

Identifiers
| CAS Number | 83-40-9 |
| 3D model (JSmol) | Interactive image |
| ChEBI | CHEBI:20141 |
| ChEMBL | ChEMBL448399 |
| ChemSpider | 6482 |
| ECHA InfoCard | 100.001.340 |
| EC Number | 201-473-8 |
| KEGG | C14088 |
| PubChem CID | 6738 |
| UNII | ZH3HEY032H |
| CompTox Dashboard (EPA) | DTXSID9038686 |
- InChI: InChI=1S/C8H8O3/c1-5-3-2-4-6(7(5)9)8(10)11/h2-4,9H,1H3,(H,10,11) Key: WHSXTWFYRGOBGO-UHFFFAOYSA-N
- SMILES: CC1=CC=CC(=C1O)C(=O)O

Properties
| Chemical formula | C_{8}H_{8}O_{3} |
| Molar mass | 152.149 g·mol^{−1} |
| Appearance | white solid |
| Melting point | 165.5 °C (329.9 °F; 438.6 K) |

Hazards
- GHS labelling
| Pictograms | (GHS05: Corrosive) (GHS07: Exclamation mark) |
| Signal word | Danger |
| Hazard statements | H302, H315, H318, H335 |
| Precautionary statements | P261, P264, P270, P271, P280, P301+P312, P302+P352, P304+P340, P305+P351+P338, P310, P312, P321, P330, P332+P313, P362, P403+P233, P405, P501 |
- Except where otherwise noted, data are given for materials in their standard state (at 25 °C [77 °F], 100 kPa). Infobox references

3-Methylsalicylic acid is an organic compound with the formula CH_{3}C_{6}H_{3}(CO_{2}H)(OH). It is a white solid that is soluble in basic water and in polar organic solvents. At neutral pH, the acid exists as 3-methylsalicylate Its functional groups include a carboxylic acid and a phenol group. It is one of four isomers of methylsalicylic acid.

It is produced by carboxylation of sodium o-cresolate:

CH_{3}C_{6}H_{4}ONa + CO_{2} → CH_{3}C_{6}H_{3}(CO_{2}Na)OH

== See also ==
- 4-Methylsalicylic acid
- 6-Methylsalicylic acid
