= Chlorophenol =

Group of chemical substances

Chemical structure of 2-chlorophenol

A chlorophenol is any organochloride of phenol that contains one or more covalently bonded chlorine atoms. There are five basic types of chlorophenols (mono- to pentachlorophenol) and 19 different chlorophenols in total when positional isomerism is taken into account. Chlorophenols are produced by electrophilic halogenation of phenol with chlorine.

Most chlorophenols are solid at room temperature. They have a strong, medicinal taste and smell. Chlorophenols are commonly used as pesticides, herbicides, and disinfectants.

== List of chlorophenols ==
There is a total of 19 chlorophenols, corresponding to the different ways in which chlorine atoms can be attached to the five carbons in the benzene ring of the phenol molecule, excluding the carbon atom to which the hydroxy group is attached.

Monochlorophenols have three isomers because there is only one chlorine atom that can occupy one of three ring positions on the phenol molecule; 2-chlorophenol, for example, is the isomer that has a chlorine atom in the ortho position. Pentachlorophenol, by contrast, has only one isomer because all five available ring positions on the phenol are fully chlorinated.

- Monochlorophenol (3 positional isomers)
  - 2-Chlorophenol
  - 3-Chlorophenol
  - 4-Chlorophenol
- Dichlorophenol (6 positional isomers)
  - 2,3-Dichlorophenol
  - 2,4-Dichlorophenol
  - 2,5-Dichlorophenol
  - 2,6-Dichlorophenol
  - 3,4-Dichlorophenol
  - 3,5-Dichlorophenol
- Trichlorophenol (6 positional isomers)
  - 2,3,4-Trichlorophenol
  - 2,3,5-Trichlorophenol
  - 2,3,6-Trichlorophenol
  - 2,4,5-Trichlorophenol
  - 2,4,6-Trichlorophenol
  - 3,4,5-Trichlorophenol
- Tetrachlorophenol (3 positional isomers)
  - 2,3,4,5-Tetrachlorophenol
  - 2,3,4,6-Tetrachlorophenol
  - 2,3,5,6-Tetrachlorophenol
- Pentachlorophenol (1 positional isomer)

== See also ==
- Bromophenol
- Iodophenol
