= C6H4Cl2O =

The molecular formula C_{6}H_{4}Cl_{2}O could refer to:

- 2,3-Dichlorophenol
- 2,4-Dichlorophenol
- 2,5-Dichlorophenol
- 2,6-Dichlorophenol
- 3,4-Dichlorophenol
- 3,5-Dichlorophenol
