= Dutch pollutant standards =

Environmental pollutant reference values

Dutch Standards are environmental pollutant reference values (i.e., concentrations in environmental media) used in environmental remediation, investigation and cleanup.

Barring a few exceptions, the target values are underpinned by an environmental risk analysis wherever possible and apply to individual substances. In most cases, target values for the various substances are related to a national background concentration that was determined for the Netherlands.

Groundwater target values provide an indication of the benchmark for environmental quality in the long term, assuming that there are negligible risks for the ecosystem. For metals a distinction is made between deep and shallow groundwater. This is because deep and shallow groundwater contain different background concentrations. An arbitrary limit of 10 metres has been adopted. The target values shown below are for 'shallow' groundwater, 0 – 10 m depth.

The soil remediation intervention values indicate when the functional properties of the soil for humans, plants and animals is seriously impaired or threatened. They are representative of the level of contamination above which a serious case of soil contamination is deemed to exist. The target values for soil are adjusted for the organic matter (humus) content and soil fraction <0.2 μm (Lutum - Latin, meaning "mud" or "clay"). The values below are calculated for a 'Standard Soil' with 10% organic matter and 25% lutum.

A case of environmental contamination is defined as 'serious' if >25 m^{3} soil or >100 m^{3} groundwater is contaminated above the intervention value.

The values presented below are from Annex 1, Table 1, "Groundwater target values and soil and groundwater intervention values". In previous versions of the Dutch Standards, target values for soil were also present. However, in the 2009 version, target values for soils have been deleted for all compounds except metals.

Parameter	Soil (mg/kg dry matter)		Groundwater (μg/L)	
	Target value	Intervention value	Target value	Intervention value
I metals
antimony (Sb)	3.0	15	0.15	20
arsenic (As)	29.0	55.0	10	60
barium (Ba)	160	625	50	625
beryllium (Be)	1.1	30	0.05	15
cadmium (Cd)	0.8	12	0.4	6
chromium (Cr)	100.0	380	1	30
cobalt (Co)	9.0	240	20	100
copper (Cu)	36.0	190	15	75
nickel (Ni)	35.0	210	15	75
lead (Pb)	85.0	530	15	75
mercury (Hg)	0.3	10.0	0.05	0.3
molybdenum (Mo)	3.0	200	5	300
silver (Ag)	-	15	-	40
selenium (Se)	0.7	100	0.07	160
tellurium (Te)	-	600	-	70
thallium (Tl)	1.0	15	2	7
tin (Sn)	-	900	2.2	50
vanadium (V)	42.0	250	1.2	70
zinc (Zn)	140	720	65	800
II Other inorganic substances
chloride	-	-	100 mg/L	-
cyanide - free	-	20	5	1,500
cyanide - complex	-	50	10	1,500
thiocyanate	-	20	-	1,500
III aromatic compounds
benzene	-	1.1	0.2	30
ethylbenzene	-	110	4	150
toluene	-	320	7	1,000
xylenes (sum)	-	18	0.2	70
styrene (vinylbenzene)	-	86	6	300
phenol	-	14	0.2	2,000
cresols (sum)	-	13	0.2	200
IV polycyclic aromatic hydrocarbons (PAH)
PAH (sum of 10)	-	40	-	-
naphthalene	-	-	0.01	70
phenanthrene	-	-	0.003	5
anthracene	-	-	0.0007	5
fluoranthene	-	-	0.003	1
chrysene	-	-	0.003	0.2
benz(a)anthracene	-	-	0.0001	0.5
benzo(a)pyrene	-	-	0.0005	0.05
benzo(k)fluoroanthene	-	-	0.0004	0.05
indeno(1,2,3-cd)pyrene	-	-	0.0004	0.05
benzo(ghi)perylene	-	-	0.0003	0.05
V chlorinated hydrocarbons
a. (volatile) hydrocarbons
monochloroethene (vinyl chloride)	-	0.1	0.01	5
dichloromethane	-	3.9	0.01	1,000
1,1-dichloroethane	-	15	7	900
1,2-dichloroethane	-	6.4	7	400
1,1-dichloroethene	-	0.3	0.01	10
1,2-dichloroethene (sum)	-	1	0.01	20
dichloropropanes (sum)	-	2	0.8	80
trichloromethane (chloroform)	-	5.6	6	400
1,1,1-trichloroethane	-	15	0.01	300
1,1,2-trichloroethane	-	10	0.01	130
trichloroethene (Tri)		2.5	24	500
tetrachloromethane (Tetra)	-	0.7	0.01	10
tetrachloroethene (Per)	-	8.8	0.01	40
b. chlorobenzenes
monochlorobenzene	-	15	7	180
dichlorobenzenes (sum)	-	19	3	50
trichlorobenzenes (sum)	-	11	0.01	10
tetrachlorobenzenes (sum)	-	2.2	0.01	2.5
pentachlorobenzene	-	6.7	0.003	1
hexachlorobenzene	-	2.0	0.00009	0.5
c. chlorophenols
monochlorophenols (sum)	-	5.4	0.3	100
dichlorophenols (sum)	-	22	0.2	30
trichlorophenols (sum)	-	22	0.03	10
tetrachlorophenols (sum)	-	21	0.1	10
pentachlorophenol	-	12	0.04	3
d. polychlorinated biphenyls (PCBs)
polychlorinated biphenyl (sum 7)	-	1	0.01	0.01
e. other chlorinated hydrocarbons
monochloroanilines (sum)	-	50	-	30
dioxin (sum I-TEQ)	-	0.00018	-	N/A
chloronaphthalene (sum)	-	23	-	6
VI pesticides
a. organochlorine pesticides
chlordane (sum)	-	4	0.02 ng/L	0.2
DDT (sum)	-	1.7	-	-
DDE (sum)	-	2.3	-	-
DDD (sum)	-	34	-	-
DDT/DDE/DDD (sum)	-	-	0.004 ng/L	0.01
aldrin	-	0.32	0.009 ng/L	-
dieldrin	-	-	0.1 ng/L	-
endrin	-	-	0.04 ng/L	-
drins (sum)	-	4	-	0.1
α-endosulfan	-	4	0.2 ng/L	5
α-HCH	-	17	33 ng/L	-
β-HCH	-	1.6	8 ng/L	-
γ-HCH (Lindane)	-	1.2	9 ng/L	-
HCH-compounds (sum)	-	-	0.05	-
heptachlor	-	4	0.005 ng/L	0.3
heptachlor-epoxide (sum)	-	4	0.005 ng/L	3
b. organophosphorus pesticides
none				
c. organotin pesticides
organotin compounds (sum)	-	2.5	0.05 - 16 ng/L	0.7
d. chlorophenoxy-acetic acid herbicides
MCPA	-	4	0.02	50
e. other pesticides
atrazine	-	7.1	29 ng/L	150
carbaryl	-	0.45	2 ng/L	50
carbofuran	-	0.017	9 ng/L	100
VII Other substances
asbestos	-	100	-	-
cyclohexanone	-	150	0.5	15,000
dimethyl phthalate	-	82	-	-
diethyl phthalate	-	53	-	-
diisobutyl phthalate	-	17	-	-
dibutyl phthalate	-	36	-	-
butyl benzyl phthalate	-	48	-	-
dihexyl phthalate	-	220	-	-
di(2-ethylhexyl)phthalate	-	60	-	-
phthalates (sum)	-	-	0.5	5
mineral oil	-	5,000	50	600
pyridine	-	11	0.5	30
tetrahydrofuran	-	7	0.5	300
tetrahydrothiophene	-	8.8	0.5	5,000
tetrabromomethane (bromoform)	-	75	-	630
