= Coalite =

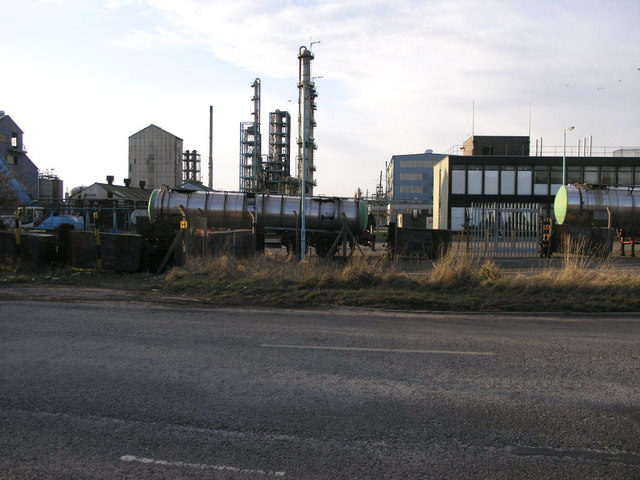
The Coalite plant near Shuttlewood in 2006

Coalite is a brand of low-temperature coke used as a smokeless fuel. The title refers to the residue left behind when coal is carbonised at 640 °C (1,184 °F). It was invented by Thomas Parker in 1904. In 1936 the Smoke Abatement Society awarded its inventor a posthumous gold medal.

Coalite is darker and more friable than high temperature coke. It is easier to ignite, burns with an attractive flame, and is lighter than coal, making it an ideal fuel for open domestic firegrates. Drawbacks are its tendencies to produce an excessive residual ash, to burn quickly and give off sulphurous fumes.

== Carbonisation process ==
Coal delivered by rail, first from the nearby Bolsover colliery, and later from other sources, was heated in eight large air sealed ovens called "batteries". Volatile constituents were driven off and condensed into coal oil and a watery fraction called ammoniacal liquor. Coal gas was used to heat the ovens and also burned in the works boilers and furnaces. Any excess was flared off. The coal oil and liquor were piped over the road to the chemical works section where they were processed into various fractions and industrial chemicals. The residual Coalite solid fuel was cooled, then sorted into various grades based on size and stockpiled for distribution by road transport.

== The Coalite Company ==
Two years after Parker died in 1915, the forerunner of the Coalite company was formed with the building of a production unit at Barugh near Barnsley. In the 20s, two more plants at Askern near Doncaster and at East Greenwich in London were opened, the latter being operated under license by the South Metropolitan Gas Company.

In April 1937, the main manufacturing plant at Buttermilk Lane, Bolsover was opened by Prince George, Duke of Kent. At the time it was the largest one of its type in the world.

In 1939, another works was opened at Wern Tarw in South Wales. In the 1950s older plants were closed and production was concentrated at the expanded Bolsover and Askern plants. Plants were also opened later in Rossington, near Doncaster, and at Grimethorpe in South Yorkshire. The coal oil and liquor from all these plants was processed at the central refinery at the Bolsover plant. The ovens continued producing Coalite until the Bolsover works closed down in 2004.

By 1939, the company was producing a low octane petrol called "Coalene" as well as diesel and other fuel oils. It continued to do so through the Second World War and into the early 1960s. It supplied fuel to the Royal Air Force and Royal Navy during the war, reputedly keeping 12 squadrons flying and two battleships sailing.

In 1948, the company changed its name to the Coalite Chemical Company to reflect the diversified nature of the business. In 1952 the registered Head office address was moved from London to Bolsover. In 1956, after the introduction of the Clean Air Act 1956 Coalite was licensed as an "authorised fuel". Demand increased and the company expanded accordingly.

The group consisted of several companies in the 1950–1960s, with Francis L. Waring, F.Inst.F., as managing director of this group of companies:

- Coalite and Chemical Products Limited, (the holding company)
- Doncaster Coalite Limited,
- The Derbyshire Coalite Co.Ltd, (ran the solid fuel production at Bolsover)
- The British Diesel Oil & Petrol Co. (ran the refinery at Bolsover)
- The South Wales Coalite Co. Ltd.
- London Coalite Ltd.

In 1978, the company merged with the Charringtons Coke distribution company and with this they acquired the Falkland Islands Company. From 1984 to 1989 Eric Varley, the ex-Labour cabinet minister was company chairman.

In 1986, the group acquired Hargreaves Fuel distribution services. This marked the zenith of the company's fortunes. The group was now at its most diverse and widespread, owning subsidiaries that were totally unrelated to its core business. These included sheep farming, Dormobile camper vans, Builders merchants, Pyrometer Instrument manufacturers, vehicle sales and many others as well as industrial land across the country. From 1987 to 1991, the company sponsored Chesterfield F.C.

In 1989, the company was taken over by Anglo United, From 1990 to 1992, the company sponsored world class snooker tournaments.

In 1997, Falkland Islands Holdings subsidiary was floated off and became an independent company again.

The solid fuel side of the business began to shrink in the 1980s. There was falling demand for the product as cheaper natural gas gradually took over the domestic heating market. The Askern works closed in 1986 and Grimethorpe in 1994. After 1982, there were several waves of redundancies.

As well as the reduced demand for solid fuel the slow demise of the company was accelerated after the Anglo takeover. During the 1990s, there were financial difficulties because the relatively small Anglo United had borrowed heavily from HSBC to buy the much larger Coalite group and had intended to service this debt by asset stripping Coalite's many subsidiaries, selling them off whilst retaining the core business of solid fuel production. The sell-off did not realise as much cash as was required and even a raid on the company pension fund did little to reduce the debt. Weighed down by this debt and with little money for investment the company declined as it faced outside competition in a downturned agrochemical market. It was making losses of £2 million per annum in the late 90s. At the same time, it was embroiled in legal actions concerning land and river pollution and the resulting adverse publicity affected the sales of its products.

In 2002, Anglo was bought by a consortium of local businessmen. Viable assets were covertly (but legally) moved into separate subsidiaries under the Anglo holding company. The remaining debts were left with the much diminished Coalite Chemicals Ltd which went into administration and then receivership, and finding no buyers, closed down finally in 2004, leaving a considerable number of redundant employees with much reduced pensions.

== Dioxin contamination ==
The company gained attention as a manufacturer of the chemical, 245 trichlorophenol, a precursor of Agent Orange which was a defoliant used in the Malayan Emergency and the Vietnam War. An explosion in a pilot plant in 1968 had killed a chemist and spread dioxins over the debris. 79 employees contracted chloracne whilst cleaning up and even some of their families were affected by traces brought home on clothing. There was more controversy when the company appeared reluctant to reveal the location of sites where the contaminated plant debris was buried and when the case notes of an independent investigator were mysteriously stolen from her home.

A specialised 245 unit was built soon after, with stringent controls and safety measures to prevent any future accidents but when the Seveso disaster in 1976 reawakened public concern over this issue, Ted Needham, the company chairman, deemed it expedient to close down this now uneconomical plant. The reluctance of his employees to work in it may also have influenced his decision.

Problems continued with dioxin emission from the works incinerator which burned residues from the chlorination plant. This caused further public protest and instigated official investigations that culminated in prosecution and a fine of £150,000 for contamination of the river Doe Lea and surrounding farmland in 1996. In 1994, the river gained the dubious distinction of being the most polluted in the world with regard to dioxins, 27 times higher than the second worst waterway, a Norwegian Fjord near a Magnesium processing plant. The pollution was believed to extend 13 miles downstream into the River Rother and the River Don, near Rotherham in South Yorkshire.

== Closure and redevelopment ==
The site has been derelict since 2004. From 2005, the Bolsover works were gradually demolished. In November 2016, decontamination of the area began and the Environment Agency was made aware of an increase in odours from the site after complaints from local residents.

== Processes and products ==
Obtained from coal by pyrolysis

- Coalite, coal oil, coal gas, ammoniacal liquor.

Obtained from Coal oil by distillation.

- Light, middle, heavy, and wax oil. Various grades of hard pitch

Obtained from Middle oil by solvent extraction and distillation.

- Phenol, ortho-cresol, meta/para-cresol blend, 2,4-xylenol/2,5-xylenol blend, soft pitch

Obtained from ammoniacal liquor by solvent extraction, distillation and crystallisation.

- Ammonia, catechol, homocatechol, resorcinol, 2-methylresorcinol

Saleable products from further processing

- Orthophenyl-phenol, diphenyl, parachloro-orthocresol, tert-butyl-catechol, 2,5-dichlorophenol, parachloro-phenol, 2,4,5-trichlorophenol, 2,4,6-trichlorophenol, creosote blends, road tar blends, clay pigeons, hydrochloric acid, sodium hypochlorite solution, sulfuryl chloride.

Obtained from used tyres by pyrolysis

- Carbon black, scrap steel, light fuel oil

This final process might have saved the company. Successful trials with existing modified plant showed that large scale reclamation of useful products from used tyres was possible. However it came too late to prevent financial collapse. This was attributed by the company to the delayed response of the regulating authorities in granting licenses for the sale of the tyre oil as fuel.
