= C6H5ClO =

The molecular formula C_{6}H_{5}ClO (molar mass: 128.56 g/mol, exact mass: 128.0029 u) may refer to:

- Chlorophenols
  - 2-Chlorophenol, or ortho-chlorophenol
  - 3-Chlorophenol
  - 4-Chlorophenol
