= Ohio River Park =

Contaminated site in Pennsylvania, U.S.

- Superfund site
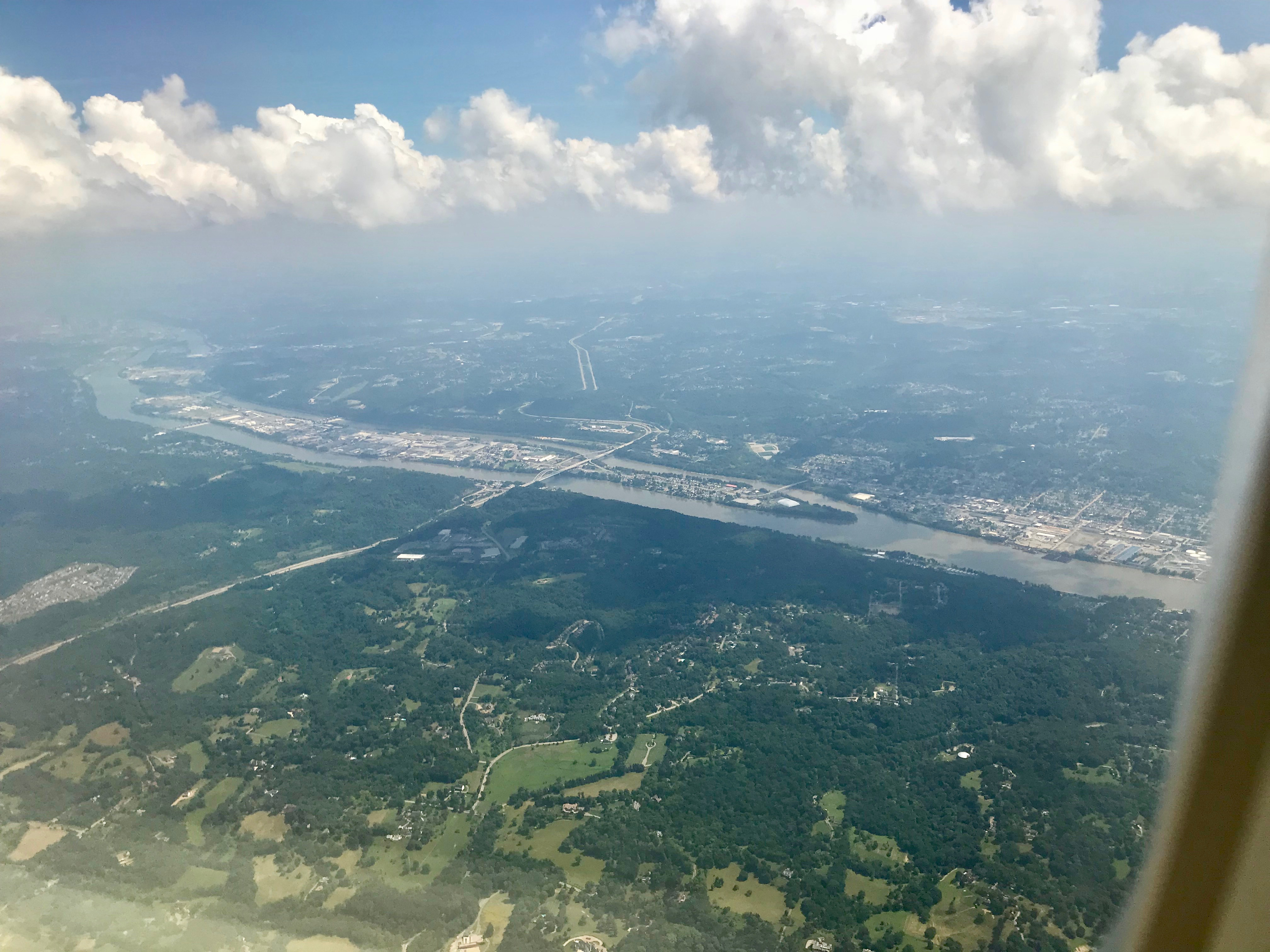
- Neville Island, Pennsylvania (shown in the middle of the image)

- Location within Pennsylvania
- Location: Neville Island, Allegheny County, Pennsylvania; 40°31′06.7″N 80°09′08.7″W

Information
- CERCLIS ID: PAD980508816
- Contaminants: VOCs, semi-VOCs, inorganics, and pesticides
- Responsible parties: Neville Land Company

Progress
- Listed: August 1990
- Construction completed: September 1999

Ohio River Park is a Superfund Site located in Neville Island, Pennsylvania. Between the 1920s-1970s, the Site was used for municipal waste, pesticide manufacturing, coke sludge disposal, cement manufacturing disposal, and pesticide waste. In 1977, Neville Land Company donated the Site to Allegheny County who started developing the Site as a community park. In 1979, Allegheny County found various hazardous contaminants on the Site. On August 30, 1990, the Site was determined to be a Superfund Site due to VOCs, SVOCs, inorganics, and pesticides being present in the surface soil, subsurface soil, surface water, river sediment, and groundwater. Soil remediation began in February 1998 and ended in September 1999.

Today, Ohio River Park has the Robert Morris University Island Sports Center and Coraopolis Bridge on top of it. Additionally, benzene continues to be monitored because it is still present in the Site's groundwater.

== History ==
In the 1920s to 1970, Ohio River Park was owned by Pittsburgh Coke & Chemical Company (also known as Calgon Carbon). In the 1930s to mid-1950s, Ohio River Park was a landfill for municipal wastes. From 1952 to 1965, Ohio River Park was used to dispose of coke sludge, cement manufacturing waste, and pesticides. In 1970, the property was transferred to a subsidiary company named Neville Land Company who donated Ohio River Park to Allegheny County in 1977. In 1977, Allegheny County started developing the area as a community park. However, in 1979, Allegheny County found benzene and other hazardous contaminants in the groundwater and soil. Allegheny County returned the land back to Neville Land Company in 1979. On August 30, 1990, the Site was added to the National Priorities List and was determined to be a Superfund Site. The United States Environmental Protection Agency (EPA) soil remediation began in February 1998 and ended in September 1999. In 2003, Robert Morris University bought the Site's land from Neville Land Company for 2.7 million. Today, the Robert Morris University Island Sports Center sits on top of Ohio River Park. This area includes a track and field area, mini golf course, golf range dome, ice rink, and boathouse. The Site is still being monitored today and will receive its next five year report in 2023.

== Site contamination ==
Contaminants

There were numerous chemicals found on the Site. The contamination came from municipal waste, pesticide manufacturing, disposed coke sludge, disposed cement manufacturing products, and pesticide waste. In 1989, the most concerning chemicals were benzene, ethylbenzene, toluene, xylene, 2,4-dichlorophenol, 2,4,5-Trichlorophenol, 2,4,6-trichlorophenol, phenol, 2-chlorophenol, 2,4-dichlorophenoxyacetic acid (2,4-D), naphthalene, bis (2-ethylhexyl) phthalate, diethyl phthalate, Silvex (commonly known as Fenoprop), and 2,4,5-trichlorophenoxyacetic acid (2,4,5-T). Benzene, toluene, ethylbenzene, and xylene are commonly known as BTEX. BTEX is found in petroleum and coal processes. Chlorophenols are common in pesticide and industrial waste. 2,4-D and 2,4,5-T were herbicides used to make Agent Orange in the Vietnam War. Additionally, cyanide, arsenic, beryllium, chromium, cadmium, lead, iron, copper, mercury, selenium, nickel, thallium, and zinc were at concerning concentrations.

After a baseline risk assessment was submitted in January 1995, the following contaminants were of concern for human health: benzene, 1,2-dichloroethane, 1,1,2-trichloroethane, benzo(a)pyrene, benzo(a)anthracene, dibenz(a,h)antharacene, 4-methylphenol, 2,4-dichlorophenol, 2,4,6-trichlorophenol, dieldrin, alpha-benzene hexachloride, gamma-chlordane, manganese, beryllium, arsenic, and mercury. These contaminants are the final contaminants of concern for the Site.

=== Benzene metabolism and health effects ===
The last contaminant of concern (COC) on the site is Benzene. Benzene is a multipotential carcinogen and produces non-carcinogenic effects such as white blood cell decrease. In 1979, the maximum benzene concentration in air was 410 μg/L. For pregnant women, concentrations of less than 1 μg/L of benzene have been proven to cause low birth weights. In 1989, maximum benzene groundwater concentrations were 67,000 μg/L. Mice have been found to have a decrease in white blood cell count after being exposed to 166 μg/L for 4 weeks.

== Toxicity effects on organisms ==
The EPA stated that the benthic, aquatic, and terrestrial community in the surrounding area should have been affected. In the official EPA documents reviewed around Ohio River Park, there were no reports of people experiencing adverse health effects like other Superfund Sites (e.g. Love Canal). The US Fish and Wildlife Service found that there were no federally threatened and/or endangered species at or near the Site.

In 1994, the Ecological Risk Assessment stated that raccoons and eastern moles were analyzed because they were present at and around the Site. The eastern mole was chosen over other small mammals because it consumed earthworms on the Site and it was exposed to the Site's soil through burrowing. Raccoons were chosen because they are omnivores and higher trophic organisms. Raccoons ate plants, fish, and amphibians on the Site. After completing the Ecological Risk Assessment, only lead was of probable concern for eastern moles, but not raccoons. There is little information showing that organisms were significantly affected by the contamination on and around Ohio River Park.

== Site policy and remediation ==
=== Site policy ===
The Safe Drinking Water Act (SDWA), Clean Water Act (CWA), and Comprehensive Environmental Response, Compensation, and Liability Act of 1980 (CERCLA) are applicable to Ohio River Park.

The SDWA protects the water quality of drinking water in the US. Under the SDWA, there are maximum contaminant levels (MCLs) that must be met. In the Site Investigation Report, arsenic, cadmium, chromium, lead, and selenium all greatly exceeded the MCL.

The CWA protects water quality in bodies of water (such as rivers and lakes) and it determines water quality criteria (i.e. standards to protect water quality in water bodies). Benzene, phenol, silvex, 2,4-dichlorophenoxyacetic acid (2,4-D), 2,4,6-trichlorophenol (2,4,6-TCP), 2-chlorophenol, and 2,4-dichlorophenol did not meet the water quality criteria (WQC) suggested by the EPA.

CERCLA was designed to protect the environment by cleaning up uncontrolled or abandoned hazardous waste sites. Additionally, the EPA seeks payment from parties responsible under CERCLA.

=== Remediation ===
In remediation projects, engineers make contaminants of concern (COCs) which are the most toxic chemicals targeted for full clean-up. The soil contaminants of concern in 1996 were benzo(a)anthracene and benzo(a)pyrene. The cleanup goal of benzo(a)anthracene and benzo(a)pyrene was set at a soil concentration of 7,800 ug/kg and 780 ug/kg, respectively. The groundwater contaminants of concern in 1998 were benzene and 2,4,6-trichlorophenol (2,4,6-TCP). The cleanup goal for benzene was set at its maximum contaminant level (MCL), 5 μg/L and 2,4,6-trichlorophenol was set at a concentration of 61 μg/L.

The EPA determines remediating any parts of a Site as an operable unit (abbreviated as OU). There were 3 OUs on the Site.

OU1 dealt with remediating the soil and it consisted of creating a multi-layer cap and gas collection system, an erosion cap, and an erosion control system with vertical barrier slurry walls. Multi-layer capping prevents various contaminants from reaching groundwater through infiltration. OU1 construction occurred in February 1998 and ended in September 1999. The cleanup goal of benzo(a)anthracene and benzo(a)pyrene was achieved.

OU2 dealt with building a new Coraopolis Bridge on top of a portion of the Site. OU2 had no human health hazards in the soil. Thus, OU2 was given no action and bridge construction was completed by 1995.

OU3 dealt with monitoring the groundwater via Monitored Natural Attenuation (MNA) and began in 2004. MNA is still ongoing. The cleanup goal for 2,4,6-trichlorophenol (2,4,6-TCP) was 61 μg/L and this goal was achieved by having a well reach less than 61 μg/L from October 2015 to December 2017. By December 2017, only two wells did not meet the benzene MCL. One well (called ERT-27S) is currently being projected to be under the MCL by 2034. The other well (called URS-24S) may not achieve the MCL by 2034, but the EPA is not concerned.
