= Dichlorophenol =

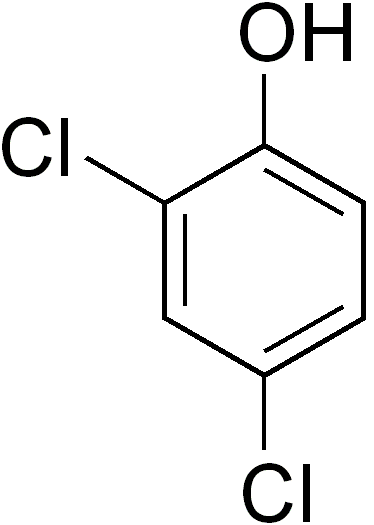
Chemical structure of 2,4-dichlorophenol

Dichlorophenols (DCPs) are any of several chemical compounds which are derivatives of phenol containing two chlorine atoms. There are six isomers:

- 2,3-Dichlorophenol
- 2,4-Dichlorophenol
- 2,5-Dichlorophenol
- 2,6-Dichlorophenol
- 3,4-Dichlorophenol
- 3,5-Dichlorophenol

Dichlorophenols are used as intermediates in the manufacture of more complex chemical compounds, including the common herbicide 2,4-dichlorophenoxyacetic acid (2,4-D).

== See also ==
- Chlorophenol
- Monobromophenol
- Monochlorophenol
- Trichlorophenol
- Pentachlorophenol
