= Collision between MV Testbank and MV Seadaniel =

The collision between MV Testbank and MV Seadaniel took place in the Mississippi River – Gulf Outlet Canal (MRGO) on July 22, 1980 when the outbound 485-foot (148 m) German container ship Testbank and inbound 580-foot (180 m) Panamanian-flagged bulk carrier Seadaniel collided near mile 41 of the canal.

== History ==
As a result of the collision, some hazardous cargo from Testbank was released. Specifically, four cargo containers carrying mixed freight were lost overboard, releasing a significant amount of pentachlorophenol (PCP) into the canal waters. The amount of PCP lost was reported as between 12 and 12.5 tons. There were two other damaged containers containing PCP reported on the deck of Testbank. In addition, a number of barrels containing hydrobromic acid were lost overboard, and others broke open and spilled onto the deck of Testbank, creating a cloud of gas around both ships. Crews were able to clean up the hydrobromic acid within a few days, but the PCP proved to be a greater challenge. Stored in 50-pound (23 kg) paper sacks, the coarse granules of PCP rapidly sank to the bottom of the channel where visibility was nearly zero. Chemical analysis of the PCP product revealed primarily PCP, tetrachlorophenol and trichlorophenol. Notably, the product also contained several polychlorinated dibenzodioxins, which are known for their toxicity and bioaccumulation. At the time, this was the largest spill of pentachlorophenol in United States history. The United States Coast Guard closed the canal until August 10, 1980. Additionally, all fishing and shrimping operations in a 400-square-mile (1,000 km^{2}) area were temporarily suspended.

The Coast Guard ultimately attributed the collision to the helmsman aboard Seadaniel, who was evidently having difficulty controlling the ship immediately before the collision, and failed to notify the ship's pilot, captain or first mate. A 9-mile (14 km) length of the canal was closed for six weeks as an estimated $2 million cleanup effort managed to clean up some 90% of the spill. The Port of New Orleans lost $1.5 million in revenue, while the vessels involved in the collision sustained $1.5 million in damage.

In Louisiana ex rel. Guste v. M/V Testbank, the United States Court of Appeals for the Fifth Circuit heard the consolidated claims of some forty-one lawsuits originally filed in the Eastern District of Louisiana. The claims in these suits stemmed from what the court held were pure economic losses in "shipping interests, marina and boat rental operators, wholesale and retail seafood enterprises not actually engaged in fishing, seafood restaurants, tackle and bait shops, and recreational fishermen". The court examined the holding in Robins Dry Dock & Repair Co. v. Flint, 275 U.S. 303 (1927).

Testbank was chartered by the Bank Line and owned by the Partenreederei MS Charlotta. She was a three-hold container ship, built in 1978, diesel powered, with a single right-hand propeller. She measured 495 feet (151 m) in length, 69 feet (21 m) in breadth, 5,629 GT, 4,064 NT and 12,914 DWT. She had a capacity of 517 twenty-foot equivalent units, and operated at a speed of 17 knots (31 km/h; 20 mph). Seadaniel was owned and operated by Fortune Sea Transport of Panama. She was a six-hold bulk carrier, built in 1976, diesel powered, with a single screw. She measured 580 feet (180 m) in length, 75 feet (23 m) in breadth, 16,168 GT, 10,998 NT and 27,000 DWT. Seadaniel was carrying baryte at the time of the collision.
