= Iodophenol =

Group of chemical substances

Chemical structure of 2-iodophenol

An iodophenol is any organoiodide of phenol that contains one or more covalently bonded iodine atoms. There are five basic types of iodophenols (mono- to pentaiodophenol) and 19 different iodophenols in total when positional isomerism is taken into account. Iodophenols are produced by electrophilic halogenation of phenol with iodine. In terms of environmental chemistry, least is known about it amongst all other halophenols.

== List of iodophenols ==
There is a total of 19 iodophenols, corresponding to the different ways in which iodine atoms can be attached to the five carbon atoms in the benzene ring of the phenol molecule, excluding the carbon atom to which the hydroxy group is attached.

Monoiodophenols have three isomers because there is only one iodine atom that can occupy one of three ring positions on the phenol molecule; 2-iodophenol, for example, is the isomer that has an iodine atom in the ortho position. Pentaiodophenol, by contrast, has only one isomer because all five available ring positions on the phenol are fully iodinated.

- Monoiodophenol (3 positional isomers)
  - 2-Iodophenol
  - 3-Iodophenol
  - 4-Iodophenol
- Diiodophenol (6 positional isomers)
  - 2,3-Diiodophenol
  - 2,4-Diiodophenol
  - 2,5-Diiodophenol
  - 2,6-Diiodophenol
  - 3,4-Diiodophenol
  - 3,5-Diiodophenol
- Triiodophenol (6 positional isomers)
  - 2,3,4-Triiodophenol
  - 2,3,5-Triiodophenol
  - 2,3,6-Triiodophenol
  - 2,4,5-Triiodophenol
  - 2,4,6-Triiodophenol
  - 3,4,5-Triiodophenol
- Tetraiodophenol (3 positional isomers)
  - 2,3,4,5-Tetraiodophenol
  - 2,3,4,6-Tetraiodophenol
  - 2,3,5,6-Tetraiodophenol
- Pentaiodophenol (1 positional isomer)

== See also ==
- Bromophenol
- Chlorophenol
