= UECL =

UECL may refer to:

- UEFA Conference League, a football competition in Europe
- Ultrasound-enhanced chemiluminescence, used for deep tissue imaging in medicine
- United Enterprises & Company Limited, official name for United Group, a Bangladeshi industrial conglomerate
