= PCPB =

PCPB may refer to:

- Carboxypeptidase B2
- Pentachlorophenol monooxygenase
