= 2,4-dichlorophenol 6-monooxygenase =

Class of enzymes

Identifiers
- EC no.: 1.14.13.20
- CAS no.: 92767-55-0

Databases
- BRENDA: enzyme data
- ExPASy: NiceZyme view
- KEGG: enzyme entry
- MetaCyc: metabolic pathway
- Rhea: reactions
- PDB structures: RCSB PDB PDBe PDBsum
- Gene Ontology: AmiGO / QuickGO
Search
- PMC: articles
- PubMed: articles
- NCBI: proteins

2,4-dichlorophenol 6-monooxygenase (EC 1.14.13.20) is an enzyme that catalyzes the chemical reaction

2,4-Dichlorophenol
+ NADPH + H^{+}
O_{2}
H_{2}O
3,5-Dichlorocatechol
+ NADP^{+}

The four substrates of this enzyme are 2,4-dichlorophenol, reduced nicotinamide adenine dinucleotide phosphate (NADPH), oxygen, and a proton. Its products are 3,5-dichlorocatechol, oxidised NADP^{+}, and water.

The enzyme is a flavin-containing monooxygenase that uses molecular oxygen as oxidant and incorporates one of its atoms into the starting material. The systematic name of this enzyme class is 2,4-dichlorophenol,NADPH:oxygen oxidoreductase (6-hydroxylating). Other names in common use include 2,4-dichlorophenol hydroxylase, and 2,4-dichlorophenol monooxygenase. It can act on other chlorophenols.
