= Pentachlorophenol monooxygenase =

Class of enzymes

Identifiers
- EC no.: 1.14.13.50
- CAS no.: 136111-57-4

Databases
- IntEnz: IntEnz view
- BRENDA: BRENDA entry
- ExPASy: NiceZyme view
- KEGG: KEGG entry
- MetaCyc: metabolic pathway
- PRIAM: profile
- PDB structures: RCSB PDB PDBe PDBsum
Search
- PMC: articles
- PubMed: articles
- NCBI: proteins

Pentachlorophenol monooxygenase (EC 1.14.13.50, pentachlorophenol dechlorinase, pentachlorophenol dehalogenase, pentachlorophenol 4-monooxygenase, PCP hydroxylase, pentachlorophenol hydroxylase, PcpB, PCB 4-monooxygenase, PCB4MO) is an enzyme with systematic name pentachlorophenol,NADPH:oxygen oxidoreductase (hydroxylating, dechlorinating). It catalyses two different chemical reactions, depending on its substrate. In each case, the starting material is a phenol.

Pentachlorophenol monooxygenase is a flavoprotein.

== Reactions catalysed ==
The enzyme acts only on phenols with halogens in the position next to the hydroxy group on the benzene ring, the 2-position.

=== With hydrogen at the 4-position ===
In this case, a typical reaction converts 2,3,5,6-tetrachlorophenol to tetrachlorohydroquinone:

2,3,5,6-Tetrachlorophenol
+ NADPH + H^{+}
O_{2}
H_{2}O
Tetrachlorohydroquinone
+ NADP^{+}

=== With a halogen at the 4-position ===
In this case, a typical reaction converts pentachlorophenol to chloranil:

pentachlorophenol
+ NADPH + H^{+}
O_{2}
H_{2}O
chloranil
+ NADP^{+} + Cl^{−}
