= Monochlorophenol =

The monochlorophenols are chemical compounds consisting of phenol substituted with a chlorine atom. There are three isomers, 2-chlorophenol, 3-chlorophenol, and 4-chlorophenol.

Chlorphenols
IUPAC name	2-Chlorophenol	3-Chlorophenol	4-Chlorophenol
Other names	o-Chlorophenol	m-Chlorophenol	p-Chlorophenol
Chemical structure	Structure of 2-chlorophenol	Structure of 3-chlorophenol	Structure of 4-chlorophenol
CAS number	95-57-8	108-43-0	106-48-9
CAS number	25167-80-0 (mixture)		
PubChem ID	CID 7245 from PubChem	CID 7933 from PubChem	CID 4684 from PubChem
Chemical formula	C_{6}H_{5}ClO		
Molar mass	128.56 g/mol^{1}		
Physical state	liquid	solid	
Melting point	7 °C	33–35 °C	43 °C
Boiling point	174 °C	214 °C	220 °C
Density	1.26 g/cm^{3}	1.25 g/cm^{3}	1.31 g/cm^{3}
Vapor pressure	2.3 mbar (20 °C)	0.23 mbar (20 °C)	0.15 mbar (20 °C)
pKa	8.48	9.08	9.38
Solubility	Low solubility in water (27–29 g/L at 20 °C)		
Flash point	85 °C	120 °C	121 °C
GHS hazard pictograms	(GHS07: Exclamation mark) (GHS09: Environmental hazard)		
GHS hazard statements	H302, H312, H332, H411		
GHS hazard statements	P273	P273, P280	P273, P302+P352

== See also ==
- Chlorophenol
- Dichlorophenol
- Monobromophenol
- Pentachlorophenol
- Trichlorophenol
