= 4-Iodophenol =

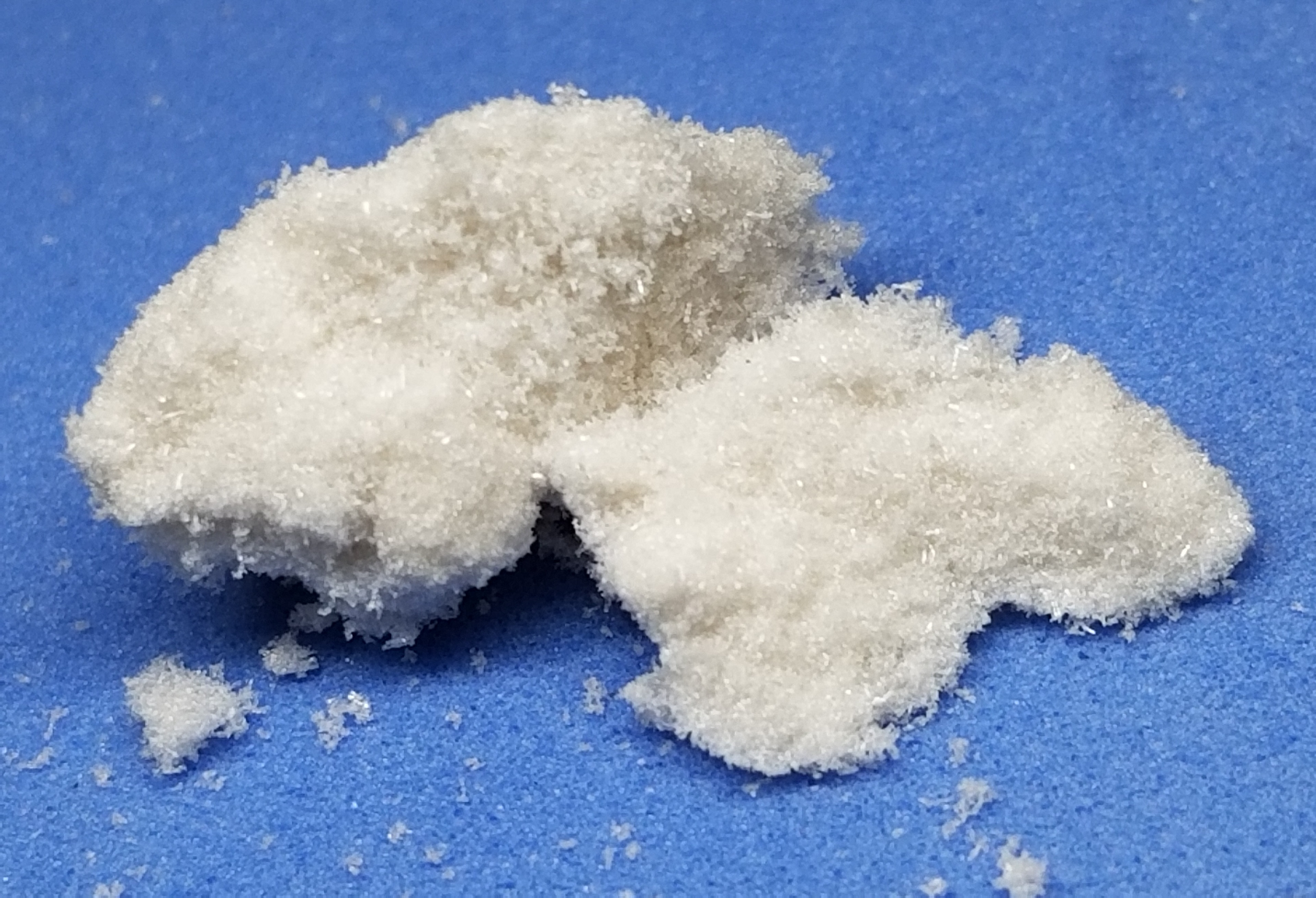

Names
- IUPAC name 4-Iodophenol
- Other names: p-Iodophenol; para-Iodophenol

Identifiers
CAS Number	540-38-5
3D model (JSmol)	Interactive image
ChEBI	CHEBI:43521
ChEMBL	ChEMBL56475
ChemSpider	10432
DrugBank	DB03002
ECHA InfoCard	100.007.951
EC Number	208-745-5
PubChem CID	10894
UNII	BH194BAK0B
CompTox Dashboard (EPA)	DTXSID4052186
- InChI: InChI=1S/C6H5IO/c7-5-1-3-6(8)4-2-5/h1-4,8H Key: VSMDINRNYYEDRN-UHFFFAOYSA-N
- SMILES: C1=CC(=CC=C1O)I

Properties
Chemical formula	C_{6}H_{5}IO
Molar mass	220.009 g·mol^{−1}
Density	1.8573 g/cm^{3} (112 °C)
Melting point	93.5 °C (200.3 °F; 366.6 K)
Boiling point	139 °C (282 °F; 412 K) (5 mmHg; decomposes)
Acidity (pK_{a})	9.33

Hazards
- GHS labelling
Pictograms	(GHS07: Exclamation mark) (GHS05: Corrosive)
Hazard statements	H302, H312, H314
Precautionary statements	P280, P305+P351+P338, P310

Related compounds
Related compounds	2-Iodophenol; 3-Iodophenol; 4-Fluorophenol; 4-Chlorophenol; 4-Bromophenol
- Except where otherwise noted, data are given for materials in their standard state (at 25 °C [77 °F], 100 kPa). Infobox references

4-Iodophenol (p-iodophenol) is an aromatic organic compound. A colorless solid, it is one of three monoiodophenols. 4-Iodophenol undergoes a variety of coupling reactions in which the iodine substituent is replaced by a new carbon group para to the hydroxy group of the phenol. It is also used to enhance chemiluminescence for detection of cancer cells and in the Eclox assay.

4-Iodophenol can be prepared from 4-aminophenol via the diazonium salt. An alternative synthesis involves reaction of salicylic acid with iodine, followed by decarboxylation.

== Cited sources ==
- Haynes, William M., ed. (2016). CRC Handbook of Chemistry and Physics (97th ed.). CRC Press. ISBN 9781498754293.
