= Ultrasound-enhanced chemiluminescence =

Use ultrasound to enhance chemiluminescence

Chemiluminescence is the emission of light through a chemical reaction. It contrasts with fluorescence, which is excited by a light source. During chemiluminescence, the vibrationally excited product of an exoergic chemical reaction relaxes to its ground state with the emission of photons. Since the process does not require excitation light, problems in its application caused by light scattering or source instability are absent, and there is no concern about autofluorescence in the background, which can lead to highly sensitive deep tissue imaging.

Recently, many advances have been made in deep tissue optics regarding ultrasound modulated fluorescence and ultrasound switchable fluorescence. With its greater potential in medical imaging, ultrasound-enhanced chemiluminescence (UECL) has been developed as a second generation of chemiluminescence, and overcomes several limitations of chemiluminescence in deep tissue imaging. The simultaneous use of ultrasound and chemiluminescence imaging techniques helps accurately visualize the tissue of interest in dual imaging. Additionally, ultrasound can serve as an efficient tool to enhance the intensity of chemiluminescence by reducing light scattering while increasing spatial resolution.

== Chemiluminescent materials ==
=== Luminol ===
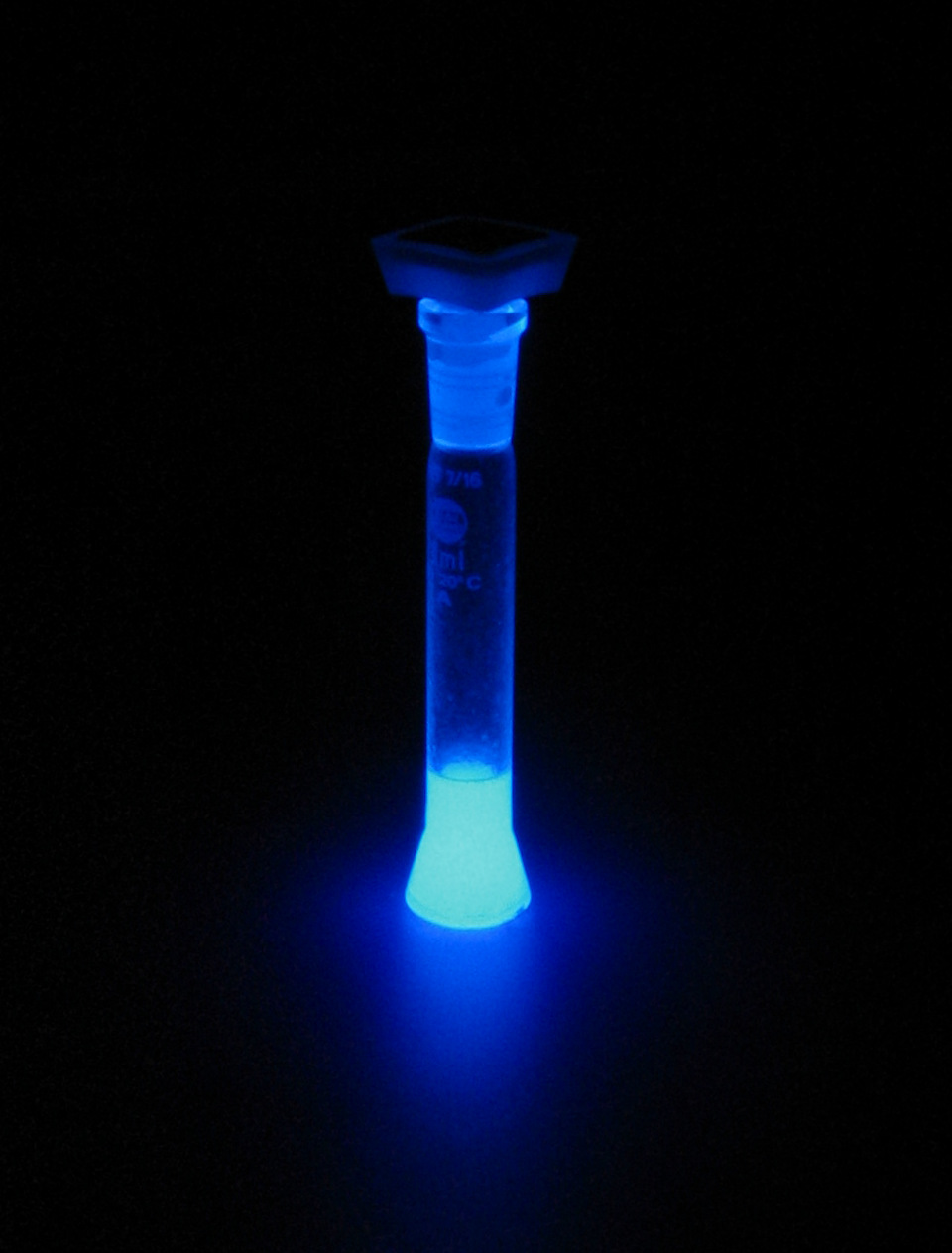
Chemiluminescence of luminol

Luminol (5-amino-2,3-dihydrophthalazine-1,4-dione) exhibits strong chemiluminescent properties. Usually found as a solid or powder, luminol appears as a white to yellowish crystalline solid. It is soluble in water and relatively stable at room temperature without luminescence. Luminol must be activated with an oxidant to produce luminescence; hydroxide ions or hydrogen peroxide(H_{2}O_{2}) usually serve as activators. Laboratory settings often use potassium ferricyanide or potassium periodate for the catalyst. The catalyst can be the iron in hemoglobin in blood forensic detection, while enzymes in biological systems can also serve as catalysts in tissue imaging. However, the quantum yield of luminol does not exceed 1.5% in aqueous systems, and 5% in dimethylsulfoxide. The peak wavelength of luminescence emission varies across different solvent environments. Specifically, in aqueous solutions, the peak wavelength of luminescence emission is measured at 425 nm.

=== Coelenterazine ===
Coelenterazine is derived from coelenterate. It possesses a superoxide anion in its structure, which enables it to produce chemiluminescence. Unlike luminol, coelenterazine does not require any catalyst to trigger luminescence. Analogs of coelenterazine such as CLA (2-methyl-6-phenyl-3,7-dihydroimidazo[1,2-a]pyrazin-3-one) and MCLA (2-methyl-6-(4-methoxyphenyl)-3,7-dihydroimidazo[1,2-a]pyrazin-3-one) have been prepared and used in many research works. In contrast to luminol, MCLA is cell impermeable and is more useful in the detection of superoxides outside the cell. Moreover, coelenterazine and its analogs could be applied as prosthetic groups of various photoproteins like mnemiopsin, aequorin, and beroverin. Coelenterazine has been used often in cancer imaging. In recent works, coelenterazine is used to estimate the elevated levels of ROS produced by cancer cells. Coelentarizine is also used in the detection and imaging of chronic inflammation associated with inflammatory bowel disease.

=== Acridinium esters ===
Acridinium esters are a class of compounds with an acridinium structure, which emit strong light signals in chemiluminescent reactions. They are commonly used in biomedical detection and analysis as luminophores or substrates in chemiluminescence assays. Acridinium does not require a catalyst to produce chemiluminescence. Hydrogen peroxide (H_{2}O_{2}) and a strong base are sufficient to cause acridinium esters to produce chemiluminescence. Acridinium phenyl esters display greater luminescence than simple acridinium alkyl esters. Compared to other chemiluminescent materials, acridinium derivatives have the advantage of displaying quick light emission with simple chemical triggers. The main disadvantage of acridinium (phenyl) esters is their instability in the aqueous medium, as the ester bond between the acridinium ring and the phenol undergoes hydrolysis.

== Mechanism of UECL ==
A chief concern for chemiluminescence is that the scattering light increases the noise of the detection. Consider the redox reaction of H_{2}O_{2}:

H_{2}O_{2} → OH^{−} + HO•

It can be inferred that, with the appearance of oxidizing agents in tissues, free HO• radical is also produced. One could locally increase the production of H_{2}O_{2} or free HO• of the target tissue while reducing those in the nearby medium to increase signal-to-noise ratios. A study conducted at 10^{–3} molar luminol and 10^{–4} molar H_{2}O_{2} showed that the intensity of sonochemiluminescence (I_{SCL}) was linearly increased with the increase of ultrasound power up to 100 W. It is proposed that water and oxygen molecules were freed and more local free radicals were created at the air-liquid interface of the bubbles' cavitation caused by ultrasound. The process can be described in equations as:

H_{2}O_{2} → OH^{−} + HO•
O_{2} → 2 O•

In further studies, it has been shown that focused ultrasound creates periodic compression and rarefaction of tissues, which can lead to changes in the local refractive index in tissues and allow less optical absorption and scattering. One can also modulate the laser light with a different frequency of ultrasound. Tissues will oscillate with different ultrasound frequencies and consequently produce harmonic interference with the laser. Simultaneously, photon-photon interaction will modulate the frequency of the transmitted laser, making the laser transverse deeper into tissues with less reflection.

== Effects of ultrasound on chemiluminescent signals ==
As discussed under "Mechanism", the intensity of sonochemiluminescence (I_{SCL}) was correlated to free radical HO• concentration and is linearly proportional to the ultrasound power. More interestingly, the effective distances are also strongly dependent on the alignment of ultrasound waves, which means that the more focused the delivered ultrasound, the less scattered the luminescent light would be, which therefore leads to a higher resolution. Although the mechanism behind this is still unclear, research has shown that temperature increases could enhance the sensitivity of chemiluminescence. This might be because the temperature of focal points is increased locally by the ultrasound.

It is also reported that the chemiluminescent signals could be greatly enhanced at a distance of 2–8 mm depending on the power of ultrasound. The proposed mechanism is that ultrasonication produces H_{2}O_{2} which subsequently stabilizes the short-lived free radicals HO•.

== Concerns ==
The major concern regarding ultrasound-enhanced chemiluminescence is the local heat generated by the ultrasound. Although the local heat could enhance the intensity and resolution of chemiluminescence images, producing heat beyond the endurance of cells can lead to tissue damage. To avoid the risks of overheating the tissues, the duration of exposure should be optimized. However, the primary cells in tissues are vulnerable to heat, and focused ultrasound-enhanced chemiluminescence has very limited ability to control local heat, there needs to be a detailed investigation into methods to overcome this limitation.

== See also ==
- Chemiluminescence
- Eclox
- luminescence
- Bioluminescence
