= 2-Iodophenol =

Names
- Preferred IUPAC name 2-Iodophenol
- Other names: o-Iodophenol; ortho-Iodophenol

Identifiers
CAS Number	533-58-4
3D model (JSmol)	Interactive image
ChEBI	CHEBI:16706
ChEMBL	ChEMBL225564
ChemSpider	10328
ECHA InfoCard	100.007.792
EC Number	208-569-9
Gmelin Reference	406034
KEGG	C01874
PubChem CID	10784
UNII	F27L34A8B9
CompTox Dashboard (EPA)	DTXSID5052175
- InChI: InChI=1S/C6H5IO/c7-5-3-1-2-4-6(5)8/h1-4,8H Key: KQDJTBPASNJQFQ-UHFFFAOYSA-N
- SMILES: C1=CC=C(C(=C1)O)I

Properties
Chemical formula	C_{6}H_{5}IO
Molar mass	220.009 g·mol^{−1}
Density	1.8757 g/cm^{3} (80 °C)
Melting point	43 °C (109 °F; 316 K)
Boiling point	186 °C (367 °F; 459 K) (160 mmHg)
Acidity (pK_{a})	8.51

Hazards
- GHS labelling
Pictograms	(GHS07: Exclamation mark)
Hazard statements	H302, H312, H315, H319, H332, H335
Precautionary statements	P261, P280, P305+P351+P338

Related compounds
Related compounds	3-Iodophenol; 4-Iodophenol; 2-Fluorophenol; 2-Chlorophenol; 2-Bromophenol
- Except where otherwise noted, data are given for materials in their standard state (at 25 °C [77 °F], 100 kPa). Infobox references

2-Iodophenol (o-iodophenol) is an aromatic organic compound with the formula IC_{6}H_{4}OH. It is a pale yellow solid that melts near room temperature. It undergoes a variety of coupling reactions in which the iodine substituent is replaced by a new carbon group ortho to the hydroxy group of the phenol, which can be followed by cyclization to form heterocycles.

It can be prepared by treatment of 2-chloromercuriphenol with iodine:

ClHgC_{6}H_{4}OH + I_{2} → IC_{6}H_{4}OH + HgCl(I)

Direct reaction of phenol with iodine gives a mixture of 2- and 4-iodo derivatives.

== Cited sources ==
- Haynes, William M., ed. (2016). CRC Handbook of Chemistry and Physics (97th ed.). CRC Press. ISBN 9781498754293.
