= 3-Iodophenol =

Names
- IUPAC name 3-Iodophenol
- Other names: m-Iodophenol; meta-Iodophenol

Identifiers
CAS Number	626-02-8
3D model (JSmol)	Interactive image
ChEBI	CHEBI:33439
ChEMBL	ChEMBL115335
ChemSpider	11769
ECHA InfoCard	100.009.931
EC Number	210-923-2
PubChem CID	12272
UNII	YU584Z4CZN
CompTox Dashboard (EPA)	DTXSID3052305
- InChI: InChI=1S/C6H5IO/c7-5-2-1-3-6(8)4-5/h1-4,8H Key: FXTKWBZFNQHAAO-UHFFFAOYSA-N
- SMILES: C1=CC(=CC(=C1)I)O

Properties
Chemical formula	C_{6}H_{5}IO
Molar mass	220.009 g·mol^{−1}
Melting point	118 °C (244 °F; 391 K)
Boiling point	186 °C (367 °F; 459 K) (100 mmHg)
Acidity (pK_{a})	9.03

Hazards
- GHS labelling
Pictograms	(GHS07: Exclamation mark)
Signal word	Warning
Hazard statements	H315, H319, H335
Precautionary statements	P261, P305+P351+P338

Related compounds
Related compounds	2-Iodophenol; 4-Iodophenol; 3-Fluorophenol; 3-Chlorophenol; 3-Bromophenol
- Except where otherwise noted, data are given for materials in their standard state (at 25 °C [77 °F], 100 kPa). Infobox references

3-Iodophenol (m-iodophenol) is an aromatic organic compound. 3-Iodophenol participates in a variety of coupling reactions in which the iodide substituent is displaced. Well cited examples include thiolate and amine nucleophiles.

3-Iodophenol can be prepared by oxidative decarboxylation of 3-iodobenzoic acid:

IC_{6}H_{4}CO_{2}H + "O" → IC_{6}H_{4}OH + CO_{2}

== Cited sources ==
- Haynes, William M., ed. (2016). CRC Handbook of Chemistry and Physics (97th ed.). CRC Press. ISBN 9781498754293.
