= 2,6-Dichlorophenol =

Skeletal formula
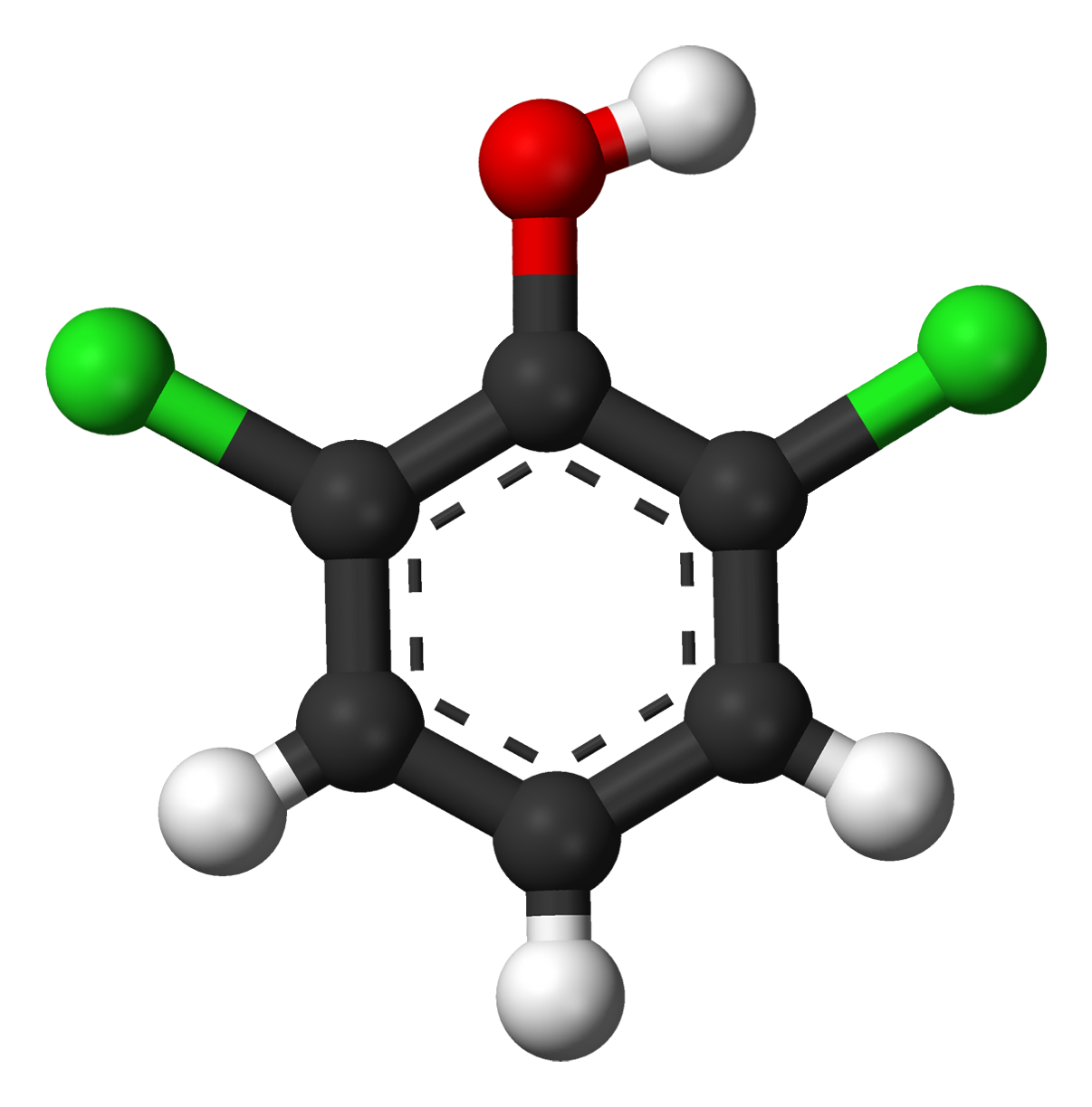
Ball-and-stick model

Names
- Preferred IUPAC name 2,6-Dichlorophenol

Identifiers
CAS Number	87-65-0
3D model (JSmol)	Interactive image
ChEBI	CHEBI:28457
ChEMBL	ChEMBL282597
ChemSpider	6633
ECHA InfoCard	100.001.602
EC Number	201-761-3
KEGG	C07096
PubChem CID	6899
RTECS number	SK8750000
UNII	Q7E9K52W7E
UN number	2020 2021
CompTox Dashboard (EPA)	DTXSID2025004
- InChI: InChI=1S/C6H4Cl2O/c7-4-2-1-3-5(8)6(4)9/h1-3,9H Key: HOLHYSJJBXSLMV-UHFFFAOYSA-N; InChI=1/C6H4Cl2O/c7-4-2-1-3-5(8)6(4)9/h1-3,9H Key: HOLHYSJJBXSLMV-UHFFFAOYAE
- SMILES: Clc1cccc(Cl)c1O

Properties
Chemical formula	C_{6}H_{4}Cl_{2}O
Molar mass	163.00 g·mol^{−1}
Appearance	white solid
Density	1.653 g/cm^{3} at 20 °C
Melting point	66.6 °C (151.9 °F; 339.8 K)
Boiling point	226 °C (439 °F; 499 K)

Hazards
- GHS labelling
Pictograms	(GHS05: Corrosive) (GHS07: Exclamation mark) (GHS09: Environmental hazard)
Signal word	Danger
Hazard statements	H314, H315, H319, H411
Precautionary statements	P260, P264, P273, P280, P301+P330+P331, P302+P352, P303+P361+P353, P304+P340, P305+P351+P338, P310, P321, P332+P313, P337+P313, P362, P363, P391, P405, P501
- Except where otherwise noted, data are given for materials in their standard state (at 25 °C [77 °F], 100 kPa). verify (what is ?) Infobox references

2,6-Dichlorophenol is a compound with formula C_{6}H_{3}Cl_{2}OH. It is one of the six isomers of dichlorophenol. It is a colorless solid. Its pK_{a} is 6.78, which is about 100x more acidic than 2-chlorophenol (8.52) and 1000x more acidic than phenol itself (9.95).

== Preparation ==
It can be produced in a multistep process from phenol, which is converted to its 4-sulfonic acid derivative. The resulting phenol sulfonic acid chlorinates at the positions flanking the phenol. Hydrolysis releases the sulfonic acid group.

An alternative synthesis starts with the ethyl ester of 4-hydroxybenzoic acid, which chlorinates at the positions flanking the phenolic center. Ester hydrolysis followed by decarboxylation affords 2,6-dichlorophenol.

== Cited sources ==
- Haynes, William M., ed. (2016). CRC Handbook of Chemistry and Physics (97th ed.). CRC Press. ISBN 9781498754293.
