= Partenreederei =

A partenreederei (German pronunciation: [ˌpaʁtn̩ʁeːdəˈʁaɪ]; Plural: Partenreedereien) is a type of partnership under German and German-influenced maritime law for the joint ownership of a merchant vessel. Each partner, or partenreeder, functions as an equity partner, sharing proportionately in the proceeds, as well as the corporate debt of the business—this liability is not limited. This form of ownership is related to the Dutch partenrederij system that ultimately gave rise to joint-stock companies, and dates back to the Middle Ages.

As a system of business organization, partenreederei was very common in the Baltic Sea and in England in the 1870s.

== German law ==
The persistence of partenreederei is one of several aspects of German maritime law that, according to Pokrant and Gran, has led to it being widely regarded as outdated and difficult to understand. In 2013, changes to the German commercial code (handelsgesetzbuch or HGB), barred the creation of new partenreedereien. Those still existing at that time were not required to reorganize.

== Austrian law ==
After the fall of Nazi Germany, the Austrian legal system retained many influences from German law. One of these was the ability to form a partenreederei. On 1 January 2007, the Trade Law Amendment Act (German: Handelsrechts-Änderungsgesetz) entered into force, preventing the formation of any more partenreedereien, but allowing those that existed previously to continue.
