= Fenclofenac =

Withdrawn NSAID drug used in rheumatism

Names
- Preferred IUPAC name [2-(2,4-Dichlorophenoxy)phenyl]acetic acid

Identifiers
CAS Number	34645-84-6
3D model (JSmol)	Interactive image
ChEMBL	ChEMBL15677
ChemSpider	58860
ECHA InfoCard	100.047.373
PubChem CID	65394
UNII	Y01JW64D01
CompTox Dashboard (EPA)	DTXSID6048830
- InChI: InChI=1S/C14H10Cl2O3/c15-10-5-6-13(11(16)8-10)19-12-4-2-1-3-9(12)7-14(17)18/h1-6,8H,7H2,(H,17,18) Key: IDKAXRLETRCXKS-UHFFFAOYSA-N; InChI=1/C14H10Cl2O3/c15-10-5-6-13(11(16)8-10)19-12-4-2-1-3-9(12)7-14(17)18/h1-6,8H,7H2,(H,17,18) Key: IDKAXRLETRCXKS-UHFFFAOYAG
- SMILES: OC(=O)Cc1ccccc1Oc2ccc(Cl)cc2Cl

Properties
Chemical formula	C_{14}H_{10}Cl_{2}O_{3}
Molar mass	297.1 g/mol
- Except where otherwise noted, data are given for materials in their standard state (at 25 °C [77 °F], 100 kPa). Infobox references

Fenclofenac is a nonsteroidal anti-inflammatory drug (NSAID) previously used in rheumatism. It has mild immunosuppressive effects and may displace thyroid hormone from its binding protein. It can also cause lichen planus.

Due to its side effects it was withdrawn from the UK and US in the 1980s.
