= Eclox =

Water treatment test

Eclox, which stands for Enhanced ChemiLuminescence and OXyradical test for water quality analysis, is a rapid toxicity technology that has been shown to correlate with other established toxicity tests. Rapid toxicity testing is unable to identify specific contaminants or their concentrations and instead function as a screening tool to quickly determine whether water is potentially toxic.

== Eclox ECL assay ==
Eclox ECL is a broadband enhanced chemiluminescence (ECL) assay that can be used to qualitatively assess a water sample to determine whether it has been contaminated. ECL reactions are used in a number of clinical and analytical applications and are based upon the oxidation of luminol in the presence of the enzyme horseradish peroxidase (HRP), an oxygen source, and an enhancer such as 4-iodophenol.

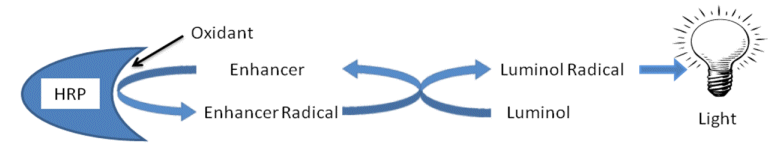

Eclox 3
