= Monobromophenol =

The monobromophenols are chemical compounds consisting of phenol substituted with a bromine atom. There are three isomers, 2-bromophenol, 3-bromophenol, and 4-bromophenol.

Bromophenols
IUPAC name	2-Bromophenol	3-Bromophenol	4-Bromophenol
Other names	o-Bromophenol	m-Bromophenol	p-Bromophenol
Chemical structure	Structure of 2-bromophenol	Structure of 3-bromophenol	Structure of 4-bromophenol
CAS number	95-56-7	591-20-8	106–41–2
PubChem ID	CID 7244 from PubChem	CID 11563 from PubChem	CID 7808 from PubChem
Chemical formula	C_{6}H_{5}BrO		
Molar mass	173.02 g/mol^{1}		
Physical state	liquid	solid	
Melting point	3–7 °C	28–32 °C	61–64 °C
Boiling point	195–196 °C	236 °C	235–236 °C
pKa	8.42	9.11	9.34
GHS hazard pictograms	(GHS02: Flammable) (GHS07: Exclamation mark) (GHS09: Environmental hazard)	(GHS07: Exclamation mark)	(GHS07: Exclamation mark)
GHS hazard statements	H226, H302, H315, H319, H335, H400	H315, H319, H335	H302, H315
GHS hazard statements	P261, P273, P305+P351+P338	P261, P305+P351+P338	P301+312+330

== See also ==
- Bromophenol
- Monochlorophenol
