= 2,3,4,5-Tetrachlorophenol =

Names
- Preferred IUPAC name 2,3,4,5-Tetrachlorophenol

Identifiers
| CAS Number | 4901-51-3 |
| 3D model (JSmol) | Interactive image |
| Beilstein Reference | 2049590 |
| ChEBI | CHEBI:132357 |
| ChEMBL | ChEMBL1528479 |
| ChemSpider | 19766 |
| ECHA InfoCard | 100.023.210 |
| EC Number | 225-531-7 |
| PubChem CID | 21013 |
| UNII | D2UW5NHW9J |
| UN number | 2020 |
| CompTox Dashboard (EPA) | DTXSID0022220 |
- InChI: InChI=1S/C6H2Cl4O/c7-2-1-3(11)5(9)6(10)4(2)8/h1,11H Key: RULKYXXCCZZKDZ-UHFFFAOYSA-N
- SMILES: C1=C(C(=C(C(=C1Cl)Cl)Cl)Cl)O

Properties
| Chemical formula | C_{6}H_{2}Cl_{4}O |
| Molar mass | 231.88 g·mol^{−1} |
| Odor | Phenolic |
| Density | 1.6 g/cm^{3} |
| Melting point | 116 °C (241 °F; 389 K) |
| Boiling point | sublimates |
- Except where otherwise noted, data are given for materials in their standard state (at 25 °C [77 °F], 100 kPa). Infobox references

2,3,4,5-Tetrachlorophenol (2,3,4,5-TCP) is a chlorinated derivative of phenol with the molecular formula C_{6}H_{2}Cl_{4}O.

== Cited sources ==
- Haynes, William M., ed. (2016). CRC Handbook of Chemistry and Physics (97th ed.). CRC Press. ISBN 9781498754293.
