= 2,4,5-Trichlorophenol =

Names
- Preferred IUPAC name 2,4,5-Trichlorophenol
- Other names Dowicide 2, Collunosol

Identifiers
CAS Number	95-95-4
3D model (JSmol)	Interactive image
Beilstein Reference	607569
ChEBI	CHEBI:28520
ChEMBL	ChEMBL109095
ChemSpider	7001
ECHA InfoCard	100.002.244
EC Number	202-467-8
Gmelin Reference	102425
KEGG	C07101
PubChem CID	7271
RTECS number	SN1400000
UNII	32526637PN
UN number	2020
CompTox Dashboard (EPA)	DTXSID4024359
- InChI: InChI=1S/C6H3Cl3O/c7-3-1-5(9)6(10)2-4(3)8/h1-2,10H Key: LHJGJYXLEPZJPM-UHFFFAOYSA-N
- SMILES: C1=C(C(=CC(=C1Cl)Cl)Cl)O

Properties
Chemical formula	C_{6}H_{3}Cl_{3}O
Molar mass	197.44 g·mol^{−1}
Melting point	68.4 °C (155.1 °F; 341.5 K)
Boiling point	262 °C (504 °F; 535 K)

Hazards
- GHS labelling
Pictograms	(GHS07: Exclamation mark) (GHS09: Environmental hazard)
Signal word	Warning
Hazard statements	H302, H315, H319, H410
Precautionary statements	P264, P270, P273, P280, P301+P312, P302+P352, P305+P351+P338, P321, P330, P332+P313, P337+P313, P362, P391, P501
Flash point	133 °C (271 °F; 406 K) cc

Related compounds
Related compounds	2,4-Dichlorophenol, 1,2,4-Trichlorobenzene, 2,4,6-Trichlorophenol
- Except where otherwise noted, data are given for materials in their standard state (at 25 °C [77 °F], 100 kPa). Infobox references

2,4,5-Trichlorophenol (TCP) is an organochloride with the molecular formula C_{6}H_{3}Cl_{3}O. It has been used as a fungicide and herbicide. Precursor chemical used in the production of 2,4,5-Trichlorophenoxyacetic acid (2,4,5-T) and hexachlorophene involves the intermediate production of 2,4,5-trichlorophenol (TCP) and the formation of 2,3,7,8-Tetrachlorodibenzodioxin (TCDD, commonly referred to simply as dioxin) as an unwanted by-product. In the course of purifying the hexachlorophene, still bottom wastes were created with concentrated levels of TCP and dioxin.

A use of TCP is in the synthesis of hexachlorophene.

== Cited sources ==
- Haynes, William M., ed. (2016). CRC Handbook of Chemistry and Physics (97th ed.). CRC Press. ISBN 9781498754293.

== See also ==
- Agent Orange
- 2,4,5-Trichlorophenoxyacetic acid
- 2,4-Dichlorophenoxyacetic acid
