= 2,3,4,6-Tetrachlorophenol =

Names
- Preferred IUPAC name 2,3,4,6-Tetrachlorophenol

Identifiers
CAS Number	58-90-2
3D model (JSmol)	Interactive image
Beilstein Reference	0779754
ChEBI	CHEBI:132359
ChEMBL	ChEMBL320361
ChemSpider	5806
ECHA InfoCard	100.000.366
EC Number	200-402-8
PubChem CID	6028
RTECS number	SM9275000
UNII	2442S914FX
UN number	2020
CompTox Dashboard (EPA)	DTXSID9021716
- InChI: InChI=1S/C6H2Cl4O/c7-2-1-3(8)5(10)6(11)4(2)9/h1,11H Key: VGVRPFIJEJYOFN-UHFFFAOYSA-N
- SMILES: C1=C(C(=C(C(=C1Cl)Cl)Cl)O)Cl

Properties
Chemical formula	C_{6}H_{2}Cl_{4}O
Molar mass	231.88 g·mol^{−1}
Odor	Phenolic
Density	1.6 g/cm^{3}
Melting point	70 °C (158 °F; 343 K)
Boiling point	150 °C (302 °F; 423 K)

Hazards
- GHS labelling
Pictograms	(GHS06: Toxic) (GHS09: Environmental hazard)
Signal word	Danger
Hazard statements	H301, H315, H319, H410
Precautionary statements	P264, P264+P265, P270, P273, P280, P301+P316, P302+P352, P305+P351+P338, P321, P330, P332+P317, P337+P317, P362+P364, P391, P405, P501
- Except where otherwise noted, data are given for materials in their standard state (at 25 °C [77 °F], 100 kPa). Infobox references

2,3,4,6-Tetrachlorophenol (2,3,4,6-TCP) is a chlorinated derivative of phenol with the molecular formula C_{6}H_{2}Cl_{4}O.

== Cited sources ==
- Haynes, William M., ed. (2016). CRC Handbook of Chemistry and Physics (97th ed.). CRC Press. ISBN 9781498754293.
