= 2,4-Dichlorophenol =

Skeletal formula
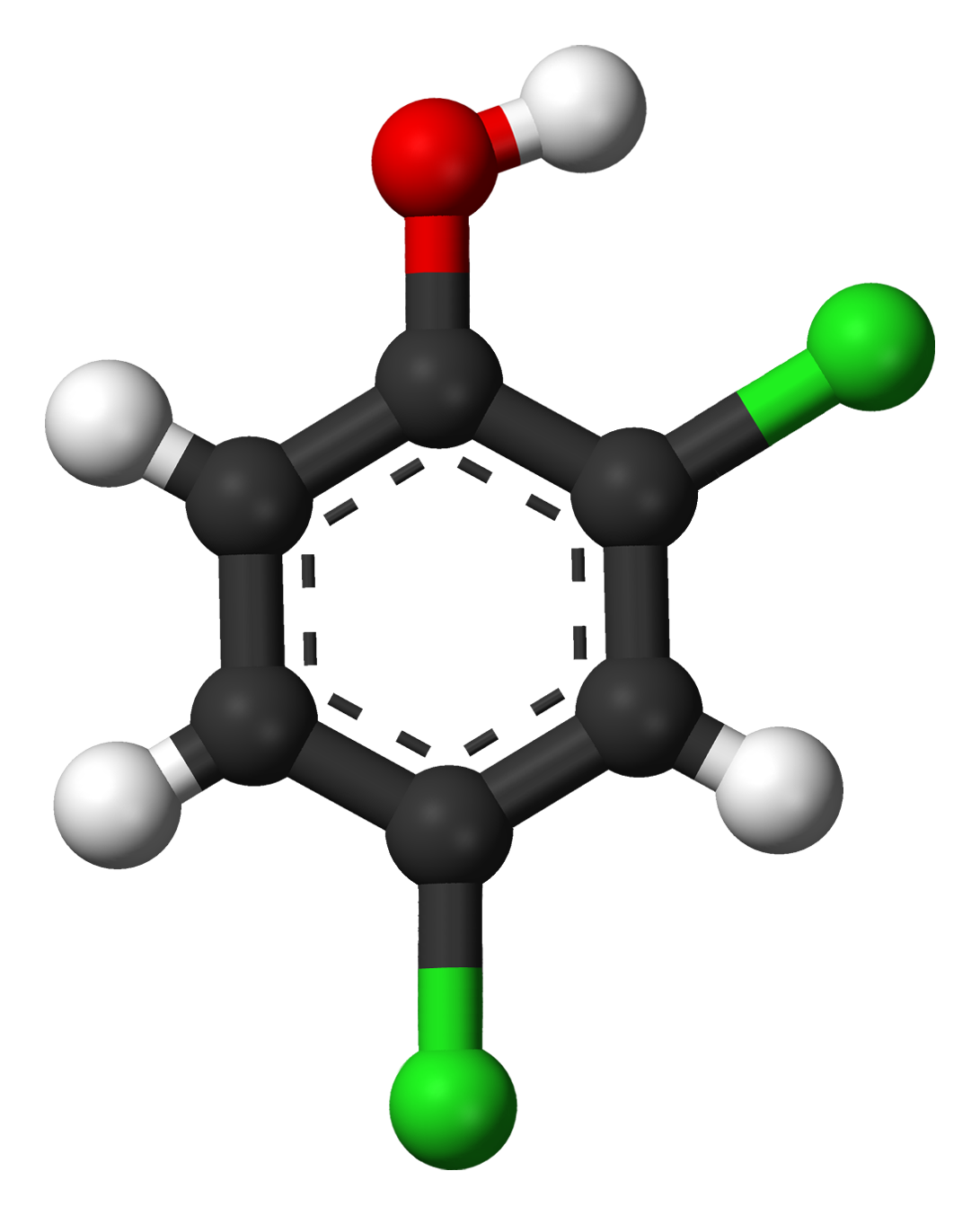
Ball-and-stick model

Names
- Preferred IUPAC name 2,4-Dichlorophenol

Identifiers
CAS Number	120-83-2
3D model (JSmol)	Interactive image
Beilstein Reference	742467
ChEBI	CHEBI:16738
ChEMBL	ChEMBL1143
ChemSpider	8140
ECHA InfoCard	100.004.027
EC Number	204-429-6
Gmelin Reference	261170
KEGG	C02625
PubChem CID	8449
RTECS number	SK8575000
UNII	R669TG1950
UN number	2020
CompTox Dashboard (EPA)	DTXSID1020439
- InChI: InChI=1S/C6H4Cl2O/c7-4-1-2-6(9)5(8)3-4/h1-3,9H Key: HFZWRUODUSTPEG-UHFFFAOYSA-N; InChI=1/C6H4Cl2O/c7-4-1-2-6(9)5(8)3-4/h1-3,9H Key: HFZWRUODUSTPEG-UHFFFAOYAU
- SMILES: Clc1cc(Cl)c(O)cc1

Properties
Chemical formula	C_{6}H_{4}Cl_{2}O
Molar mass	163.00 g·mol^{−1}
Appearance	White solid
Odor	Phenolic
Density	1.38 g/cm^{3}
Melting point	43.2 °C (109.8 °F; 316.3 K)
Boiling point	210 °C (410 °F; 483 K)
Solubility in water	50 g/L

Thermochemistry
Std enthalpy of formation (Δ_{f}H^{⦵}_{298})	−226.4 kJ·mol^{−1} (s) −156.3 kJ·mol^{−1} (gas)

Hazards
- GHS labelling
Pictograms	(GHS05: Corrosive) (GHS06: Toxic) (GHS07: Exclamation mark) (GHS09: Environmental hazard)
Signal word	Danger
Hazard statements	H302, H311, H314, H411
Precautionary statements	P260, P264, P270, P273, P280, P301+P312, P301+P330+P331, P302+P352, P303+P361+P353, P304+P340, P305+P351+P338, P310, P312, P321, P322, P330, P361, P363, P391, P405, P501
NFPA 704 (fire diamond)	3 1 0 COR
Flash point	114 °C (237 °F; 387 K)
- Lethal dose or concentration (LD, LC)
LD_{50} (median dose)	47.0 mg/kg (oral in rats); 790.0 mg/kg (Dermal exposure in mammals)
Safety data sheet (SDS)	External MSDS
- Except where otherwise noted, data are given for materials in their standard state (at 25 °C [77 °F], 100 kPa). verify (what is ?) Infobox references

2,4-Dichlorophenol (2,4-DCP) is a chlorinated derivative of phenol with the molecular formula Cl_{2}C_{6}H_{3}OH. It is a white solid that is mildly acidic (pK_{a} = 7.9). It is produced on a large scale as a precursor to the herbicide 2,4-dichlorophenoxyacetic acid (2,4-D).

== Production and use ==
2,4-DCP is produced by chlorination of phenol.

Annual worldwide production is estimated at 88 million pounds. It is also a photo-degradation product of the common antibacterial and antifungal agent triclosan along with the dioxin 2,8-dichlorodibenzo-p-dioxin.

Other notable uses include in the synthesis of chlomethoxyfen, oxyclozanide, nitrofen, dichlorprop & 2,4-DB & Fenclofenac.

== Safety ==
The LD_{50} is 580 mg/kg (rats, oral). Liquid (molten) 2,4-DCP is readily absorbed through the skin. Solid 2,4-DCP does not readily absorb through skin and has a lower NFPA H=3 rating (versus H=4 for molten 2,4-DCP). This is primarily caused by instantaneous kidney failure, liver failure, and failure of various other organs.

== See also ==
- Dichlorophenol
- 2,4-dichlorophenol 6-monooxygenase
