= 2,3-Dichlorophenol =

Names
- Preferred IUPAC name 2,3-Dichlorophenol

Identifiers
CAS Number	576-24-9
3D model (JSmol)	Interactive image
Beilstein Reference	2043615
ChEMBL	ChEMBL16656
ChemSpider	10857
ECHA InfoCard	100.008.546
EC Number	246-693-5
PubChem CID	11334
UNII	IZM39U444L
UN number	2020
CompTox Dashboard (EPA)	DTXSID7025001
- InChI: InChI=1S/C6H4Cl2O/c7-4-2-1-3-5(9)6(4)8/h1-3,9H Key: UMPSXRYVXUPCOS-UHFFFAOYSA-N
- SMILES: C1=CC(=C(C(=C1)Cl)Cl)O

Properties
Chemical formula	C_{6}H_{4}Cl_{2}O
Molar mass	163.00 g·mol^{−1}
Odor	Phenolic
Melting point	56.8 °C (134.2 °F; 329.9 K)
Acidity (pK_{a})	7.44

Hazards
- GHS labelling
Pictograms	(GHS05: Corrosive) (GHS06: Toxic) (GHS07: Exclamation mark) (GHS09: Environmental hazard)
Signal word	Danger
Hazard statements	H302, H311, H314, H411
Precautionary statements	P260, P264, P270, P273, P280, P301+P312, P301+P330+P331, P302+P352, P303+P361+P353, P304+P340, P305+P351+P338, P310, P312, P321, P322, P330, P361, P363, P391, P405, P501
NFPA 704 (fire diamond)	0 1 0 COR
Safety data sheet (SDS)	External MSDS
- Except where otherwise noted, data are given for materials in their standard state (at 25 °C [77 °F], 100 kPa). Infobox references

2,3-Dichlorophenol (2,3-DCP) is a chlorinated derivative of phenol with the molecular formula Cl_{2}C_{6}H_{3}OH.

== Cited sources ==
- Haynes, William M., ed. (2016). CRC Handbook of Chemistry and Physics (97th ed.). CRC Press. ISBN 9781498754293.
