= Pentachlorophenol =

Names
- Preferred IUPAC name Pentachlorophenol
- Other names Santophen, Pentachlorol, Chlorophen, Chlon, Dowicide 7, Pentacon, Penwar, Sinituho, Penta

Identifiers
CAS Number	87-86-5
3D model (JSmol)	Interactive image
ChEBI	CHEBI:17642
ChEMBL	ChEMBL75967
ChemSpider	967
ECHA InfoCard	100.001.617
KEGG	C02575
PubChem CID	992
UNII	D9BSU0SE4T
CompTox Dashboard (EPA)	DTXSID7021106
- InChI: InChI=1S/C6HCl5O/c7-1-2(8)4(10)6(12)5(11)3(1)9/h12H Key: IZUPBVBPLAPZRR-UHFFFAOYSA-N; InChI=1/C6HCl5O/c7-1-2(8)4(10)6(12)5(11)3(1)9/h12H Key: IZUPBVBPLAPZRR-UHFFFAOYAG
- SMILES: Oc1c(Cl)c(Cl)c(Cl)c(Cl)c1Cl

Properties
Chemical formula	C_{6}HCl_{5}O
Molar mass	266.34
Appearance	White crystalline solid
Odor	benzene-like
Density	1.978 g/cm^{3} at 22 °C
Melting point	189.5 °C (373.1 °F; 462.6 K)
Boiling point	310 °C (590 °F; 583 K) (decomposes)
Solubility in water	0.020 g/L at 30 °C
Vapor pressure	0.0001 mmHg (25°C)

Thermochemistry
Heat capacity (C)	202.0 J·mol^{−1}·K^{−1}
Std molar entropy (S^{⦵}_{298})	253.2 J·mol^{−1}·K^{−1}
Std enthalpy of formation (Δ_{f}H^{⦵}_{298})	−292.5 kJ·mol^{−1}

Hazards
- Lethal dose or concentration (LD, LC)
LD_{50} (median dose)	117 mg/kg (mouse, oral); 128 mg/kg (hamster, oral); 17 mg/kg (rat, oral); 150 mg/kg (rat, oral)
LD_{Lo} (lowest published)	70 mg/kg (rabbit, oral)
LC_{50} (median concentration)	355 mg/m^{3} (rat); 225 mg/m^{3} (mouse)
- NIOSH (US health exposure limits)
PEL (Permissible)	TWA 0.5 mg/m^{3} [skin]
REL (Recommended)	TWA 0.5 mg/m^{3} [skin]
IDLH (Immediate danger)	2.5 mg/m^{3}
- Except where otherwise noted, data are given for materials in their standard state (at 25 °C [77 °F], 100 kPa). verify (what is ?) Infobox references

Pentachlorophenol (PCP) is an organochlorine compound used as a pesticide and a disinfectant. First produced in the 1930s, it is marketed under many trade names. It can be found as pure PCP, or as the sodium salt of PCP, the latter of which dissolves easily in water. It can be biodegraded by some bacteria, including Sphingobium chlorophenolicum.

== Uses ==
PCP has been used as a herbicide, insecticide, fungicide, algaecide, and disinfectant and as an ingredient in antifouling paint. Some applications were in agricultural seeds (for nonfood uses), leather, masonry, wood preservation, cooling-tower water, rope, and paper. It has previously been used in the manufacture of food packaging materials. Its use has declined due to its high toxicity and slow biodegradation.

Two general methods are used for preserving wood. The pressure process method involves placing wood in a pressure-treating vessel, where it is immersed in PCP and then subjected to applied pressure. In the nonpressure process method, PCP is applied by spraying, brushing, dipping, or soaking.

Pentachlorophenol esters can be used as active esters in peptide synthesis, much like more popular pentafluorophenyl esters.

== Exposure ==
People may be exposed to PCP in occupational settings through the inhalation of contaminated workplace air and dermal contact with wood products treated with PCP. Also, general population exposure may occur through contact with contaminated environment media, particularly in the vicinity of wood-treatment facilities and hazardous-waste sites. In addition, some other important routes of exposure seem to be the inhalation of contaminated air, ingestion of contaminated ground water used as a source of drinking water, ingestion of contaminated food, and dermal contact with soils or products treated with the chemical.

== Toxicity ==
Short-term exposure to large amounts of PCP can cause harmful effects on the liver, kidneys, blood, lungs, nervous system, immune system, and gastrointestinal tract. Elevated temperature, profuse sweating, uncoordinated movement, muscle twitching, and coma are additional side effects.

Contact with PCP (particularly in the form of vapor) can irritate the skin, eyes, and mouth. Long-term exposure to low levels, such as those that occur in the workplace, can cause damage to the liver, kidneys, blood, and nervous system. Finally, exposure to PCP is also associated with carcinogenic, renal, and neurological effects. The U.S. Environmental Protection Agency toxicity class classifies PCP in group B2 (probable human carcinogen).

=== Monitoring of human exposure ===
Pentachlorophenol may be measured in plasma or urine as an index of excessive exposure. This is usually performed by gas chromatography with electron-capture or mass-spectrometric detection. Since urine contains predominantly conjugated PCP in chronic exposure situations, prior hydrolysis of specimens is recommended. The current ACGIH biological exposure limits for occupational exposure to PCP are 5 mg/L in an end-of-shift plasma specimen and 2 mg/g creatinine in an end-of-shift urine specimen.

== Absorption in humans and animals ==
PCP is quickly absorbed through the gastrointestinal tract following ingestion. Accumulation is not common, but if it does occur, the major sites are the liver, kidneys, plasma protein, spleen, and fat. Unless kidney and liver functions are impaired, PCP is quickly eliminated from tissues and blood, and is excreted, mainly unchanged or in conjugated form, via the urine. Single doses of PCP have half-lives in blood of 30 to 50 hours in humans. Biomagnification of PCP in the food chain is not thought to be significant due to the fairly rapid metabolism of the compound by exposed organisms.

== Releases to the environment ==
PCP has been detected in surface waters and sediments, rainwater, drinking water, aquatic organisms, soil, and food, as well as in human milk, adipose tissue, and urine. As PCP is generally used for its properties as a biocidal agent, considerable concern exists about adverse ecosystem effects in areas of PCP contamination.

Releases to the environment are decreasing as a result of declining consumption and changing use methods. However, PCP is still released to surface waters from the atmosphere by wet deposition, from soil by run off and leaching, and from manufacturing and processing facilities. PCP is released directly into the atmosphere via volatilization from treated wood products and during production. Finally, releases to the soil can be by leaching from treated wood products, atmospheric deposition in precipitation (such as rain and snow), spills at industrial facilities, and at hazardous waste sites.

After PCP is released into the atmosphere, it decomposes through photolysis. The main biodegradative pathway for PCP is reductive dehalogenation. In this process, the compound PCP is broken down to tetrachlorophenols, trichlorophenols, and dichlorophenols. Another pathway is methylation to pentachloroanisole (a more lipid-soluble compound). These two methods eventually lead to ring cleavage and complete degradation.

In shallow waters, PCP is also quickly removed by photolysis. In deep or turbid water processes, sorption and biodegradation take place. In reductive soil and sediments, PCP can be degraded within 14 days to 5 years, depending on the anaerobic soil bacteria that are present. However, adsorption of PCP in soils is pH dependent because it increases under acidic conditions and decreases in neutral and basic conditions.

== Synthesis ==
PCP can be produced by the chlorination of phenol in the presence of catalyst (anhydrous aluminium or ferric chloride) and a temperature up to about 191 °C. This process does not result in complete chlorination and commercial PCP is only 84–90% pure. The main contaminants include other polychlorinated phenols, polychlorinated dibenzo-p-dioxins, and polychlorinated dibenzofurans. Some of these species are even more toxic than the PCP itself.

== Pentachlorophenol by country ==
Pentachlorophenol is classified as a persistent organic pollutant (POP). In May 2015, countries which have signed the Stockholm Convention voted 90–2 to ban pentachlorophenol use. The United States is not a signatory and has not banned the chemical.

=== New Zealand ===
PCP was used in New Zealand as a timber preservative and antisapstain treatment, but since 1988 is no longer used.

It was also sold as a moss killer to the general public (by Shell, at least) in the form of a 115g/L aqueous solution and labelled as a poison.

=== United States ===
Since the early 1980s, the purchase and use of PCP in the U.S. has not been available to the general public. Nowadays, most of the PCP used in the U.S. is restricted to the treatment of utility poles and railroad ties. In the United States, any drinking-water supply with a PCP concentration exceeding the MCL, 1 ppb, must be notified by the water supplier to the public. Disposal of PCP and PCP-contaminated substances are regulated under RCRA as F-listed (F021) or D-listed (D037) hazardous wastes. Bridges and similar structures such as piers can still be treated with pentachlorophenol.

=== Chile ===
PCP was widely used in Chile until the early 1990s as a fungicide to combat the so-called "blue stain" in pine timber under the name of Basilit.

== See also ==
- Chlorophenol
- Collision between MV Testbank and MV Seadaniel
- Creosote
- Dichlorophenol
- Havertown Superfund
- Monochlorophenol
- Trichlorophenol

== Cited sources ==
- Haynes, William M., ed. (2016). CRC Handbook of Chemistry and Physics (97th ed.). CRC Press. ISBN 9781498754293.
