= 3-Chlorophenol =

- 3-Chlorophenol

Names
- Preferred IUPAC name 3-Chlorophenol
- Other names m-Chlorophenol meta-Chlorophenol; 3-Hydroxychlorobenzene

Identifiers
CAS Number	108-43-0
3D model (JSmol)	Interactive image
ChemSpider	13875432
ECHA InfoCard	100.003.257
PubChem CID	7933
UNII	Z2Z7M2FTAD
CompTox Dashboard (EPA)	DTXSID4024800
- InChI: InChI=1S/C6H5ClO/c7-5-2-1-3-6(8)4-5/h1-4,8H Key: HORNXRXVQWOLPJ-UHFFFAOYSA-N
- SMILES: C1=CC(=CC(=C1)Cl)O

Properties
Chemical formula	C_{6}H_{5}ClO
Molar mass	128.56 g·mol^{−1}
Appearance	Colorless or white oily solid
Density	1.245 g/cm^{3} at 45 °C
Melting point	32.5 °C (90.5 °F; 305.6 K)
Boiling point	210 °C (410 °F; 483 K)
Solubility in water	20 g/L at 20 °C
Solubility in other solvents	Soluble in ethanol, diethyl ether, benzene
Acidity (pK_{a})	9.12
Magnetic susceptibility (χ)	−77.6·10^{−6} cm^{3}/mol
Refractive index (n_{D})	1.5565

Thermochemistry
Std enthalpy of formation (Δ_{f}H^{⦵}_{298})	−206.4 kJ·mol^{−1} (s) −189.3 kJ·mol^{−1} (l)
Enthalpy of fusion (Δ_{f}H^{⦵}_{fus})	14.9 kJ·mol^{−1}

Hazards
- Occupational safety and health (OHS/OSH)
Main hazards	Corrosive – causes burns
Flash point	120 °C (248 °F; 393 K)
Autoignition temperature	550 °C (1,022 °F; 823 K)
Safety data sheet (SDS)	MSDS

Related compounds
Related aromatic hydrocarbons	Benzene; Phenol; Chlorobenzene
- Except where otherwise noted, data are given for materials in their standard state (at 25 °C [77 °F], 100 kPa). verify (what is ?) Infobox references

3-Chlorophenol is an organic compound with the molecular formula C_{6}H_{4}ClOH. It is one of three isomers of monochlorophenol. It is a colorless or white solid that melts easily and exhibits significant solubility in water. Together with 3,5-dichlorophenol, it is prepared industrially by dechlorination of polychlorophenols. Alternatively, it arises via the cumene process, which starts with the alkylation of chlorobenzene with propylene.

== Cited sources ==
- Haynes, William M., ed. (2016). CRC Handbook of Chemistry and Physics (97th ed.). CRC Press. ISBN 9781498754293.
