= 3,4-Dichlorophenol =

Names
- Preferred IUPAC name 3,4-Dichlorophenol

Identifiers
CAS Number	95-77-2
3D model (JSmol)	Interactive image
Beilstein Reference	907693
ChEBI	CHEBI:34323
ChEMBL	ChEMBL1549385
ChemSpider	6988
ECHA InfoCard	100.002.228
EC Number	202-450-5
KEGG	C14462
PubChem CID	7258
UNII	070FTM6DVF
UN number	2020
CompTox Dashboard (EPA)	DTXSID7025005
- InChI: InChI=1S/C6H4Cl2O/c7-5-2-1-4(9)3-6(5)8/h1-3,9H Key: WDNBURPWRNALGP-UHFFFAOYSA-N
- SMILES: C1=CC(=C(C=C1O)Cl)Cl

Properties
Chemical formula	C_{6}H_{4}Cl_{2}O
Molar mass	163.00 g·mol^{−1}
Odor	Phenolic
Melting point	67.8 °C (154.0 °F; 340.9 K)
Boiling point	253 °C (487 °F; 526 K)

Hazards
- GHS labelling
Pictograms	(GHS05: Corrosive) (GHS06: Toxic) (GHS07: Exclamation mark) (GHS09: Environmental hazard)
Signal word	Danger
Hazard statements	H302, H311, H314, H411
Precautionary statements	P260, P264, P270, P273, P280, P301+P312, P301+P330+P331, P302+P352, P303+P361+P353, P304+P340, P305+P351+P338, P310, P312, P321, P322, P330, P361, P363, P391, P405, P501
NFPA 704 (fire diamond)	0 1 0 COR
Safety data sheet (SDS)	External MSDS
- Except where otherwise noted, data are given for materials in their standard state (at 25 °C [77 °F], 100 kPa). Infobox references

3,4-Dichlorophenol (3,4-DCP) is a chlorinated derivative of phenol with the molecular formula Cl_{2}C_{6}H_{3}OH.

== Cited sources ==
- Haynes, William M., ed. (2016). CRC Handbook of Chemistry and Physics (97th ed.). CRC Press. ISBN 9781498754293.
