= 4-Chlorophenol =

Names
- Preferred IUPAC name 4-Chlorophenol
- Other names p-Chlorophenol, para-Chlorophenol

Identifiers
CAS Number	106-48-9
3D model (JSmol)	Interactive image
Beilstein Reference	507004
ChEBI	CHEBI:28078
ChEMBL	ChEMBL57053
ChemSpider	13875219
DrugBank	DB13154
ECHA InfoCard	100.003.094
EC Number	203-402-6
Gmelin Reference	2902
KEGG	C02124
PubChem CID	4684
RTECS number	SK2800000
UNII	3DLC36A01X
UN number	2020
CompTox Dashboard (EPA)	DTXSID1021871
- InChI: InChI=1S/C6H5ClO/c7-5-1-3-6(8)4-2-5/h1-4,8H Key: WXNZTHHGJRFXKQ-UHFFFAOYSA-N
- SMILES: C1=CC(=CC=C1O)Cl

Properties
Chemical formula	C_{6}H_{5}ClO
Molar mass	128.56 g·mol^{−1}
Appearance	White solid
Density	1.2651 g/cm^{3} at 40 °C
Melting point	43.1 °C (109.6 °F; 316.2 K)
Boiling point	219 °C (426 °F; 492 K)
Solubility in water	27.1 g/L
Acidity (pK_{a})	9.41
Magnetic susceptibility (χ)	−77.7·10^{−6} cm^{3}/mol
Refractive index (n_{D})	1.5579

Structure
Dipole moment	2.11 D

Thermochemistry
Std enthalpy of formation (Δ_{f}H^{⦵}_{298})	−197.7 kJ·mol^{−1} (s) −181.3 kJ·mol^{−1} (l)
Enthalpy of fusion (Δ_{f}H^{⦵}_{fus})	14.1 kJ·mol^{−1}

Hazards
- GHS labelling
Pictograms	(GHS05: Corrosive) (GHS06: Toxic) (GHS07: Exclamation mark) (GHS09: Environmental hazard)
Signal word	Danger
Hazard statements	H290, H301, H302, H312, H314, H332, H411
Precautionary statements	P234, P260, P264, P270, P271, P273, P280, P301+P310, P301+P312, P301+P330+P331, P302+P352, P303+P361+P353, P304+P312, P304+P340, P305+P351+P338, P310, P312, P321, P322, P330, P363, P390, P391, P404, P405, P501
Flash point	121 °C (250 °F; 394 K)
- Except where otherwise noted, data are given for materials in their standard state (at 25 °C [77 °F], 100 kPa). Infobox references

4-Chlorophenol is an organic compound with the formula C_{6}H_{4}ClOH. It is one of three monochlorophenol isomers. It is a colorless or white solid that melts easily and exhibits significant solubility in water. Its pK_{a} is 9.41.

== Preparation and reaction ==
It is prepared by chlorination of phenol, preferably in polar solvents, which tends to yield the 4-chloro derivative. Direct chlorination of molten phenol favors the formation of 2-chlorophenol.

It once was produced on a large scale as a precursor to hydroquinone. It is a classic precursor, upon reaction with phthalic anhydride, to quinizarin. The commercial dye quinizarin is produced by the reaction of phthalic anhydride and 4-chlorophenol followed by hydrolysis of the chloride.

Clofibrate, a drug for controlling the high cholesterol and triacylglyceride level in the blood, is derived from 4-chlorophenol.

== Cited sources ==
- Haynes, William M., ed. (2016). CRC Handbook of Chemistry and Physics (97th ed.). CRC Press. ISBN 9781498754293.
