= 2,3,5,6-Tetrachlorophenol =

Names
- Preferred IUPAC name 2,3,5,6-Tetrachlorophenol

Identifiers
CAS Number	935-95-5
3D model (JSmol)	Interactive image
Beilstein Reference	2049590
ChEBI	CHEBI:52048
ChEMBL	ChEMBL1528479
ChemSpider	5806
ECHA InfoCard	100.012.100
EC Number	225-531-7
KEGG	C15505
PubChem CID	13636
RTECS number	SM9450000
UNII	SW5F2W8SDJ
UN number	2020
CompTox Dashboard (EPA)	DTXSID2026101
- InChI: InChI=1S/C6H2Cl4O/c7-2-1-3(8)6(11)5(10)4(2)9/h1,11H Key: VGVRPFIJEJYOFN-UHFFFAOYSA-N
- SMILES: C1=C(C(=C(C(=C1Cl)Cl)O)Cl)Cl

Properties
Chemical formula	C_{6}H_{2}Cl_{4}O
Molar mass	231.88 g·mol^{−1}
Odor	Phenolic
Melting point	115 °C (239 °F; 388 K)

Hazards
- GHS labelling
Pictograms	(GHS05: Corrosive) (GHS06: Toxic) (GHS07: Exclamation mark)
Signal word	Danger
Hazard statements	H301, H315, H318, H335, H413
Precautionary statements	P261, P264, P264+P265, P270, P271, P273, P280, P301+P316, P302+P352, P304+P340, P305+P354+P338, P317, P319, P321, P330, P332+P317, P362+P364, P403+P233, P405, P501
- Except where otherwise noted, data are given for materials in their standard state (at 25 °C [77 °F], 100 kPa). Infobox references

2,3,5,6-Tetrachlorophenol (2,3,5,6-TCP) is a chlorinated derivative of phenol with the molecular formula C_{6}H_{2}Cl_{4}O.

== Cited sources ==
- Haynes, William M., ed. (2016). CRC Handbook of Chemistry and Physics (97th ed.). CRC Press. ISBN 9781498754293.
