= 2,5-Dichlorophenol =

Names
- Preferred IUPAC name 2,5-Dichlorophenol

Identifiers
| CAS Number | 583-78-8 |
| 3D model (JSmol) | Interactive image |
| Beilstein Reference | 1907692 |
| ChEBI | CHEBI:27929 |
| ChEMBL | ChEMBL1565192 |
| ChemSpider | 65 |
| ECHA InfoCard | 100.008.657 |
| EC Number | 209-520-4 |
| KEGG | C06602 |
| PubChem CID | 66 |
| UNII | 3B11G9AKBA |
| UN number | 2020 |
| CompTox Dashboard (EPA) | DTXSID7025003 |
- InChI: InChI=1S/C6H4Cl2O/c7-4-1-2-5(8)6(9)3-4/h1-3,9H Key: RANCECPPZPIPNO-UHFFFAOYSA-N
- SMILES: C1=CC(=C(C=C1Cl)O)Cl

Properties
| Chemical formula | C_{6}H_{4}Cl_{2}O |
| Molar mass | 163.00 g·mol^{−1} |
| Odor | Phenolic |
| Melting point | 57.8 °C (136.0 °F; 330.9 K) |
| Boiling point | 222 °C (432 °F; 495 K) |

Hazards
- GHS labelling
| Pictograms | (GHS05: Corrosive) (GHS06: Toxic) (GHS07: Exclamation mark) (GHS09: Environmental hazard) |
| Signal word | Danger |
| Hazard statements | H302, H311, H314, H411 |
| Precautionary statements | P260, P264, P270, P273, P280, P301+P312, P301+P330+P331, P302+P352, P303+P361+P353, P304+P340, P305+P351+P338, P310, P312, P321, P322, P330, P361, P363, P391, P405, P501 |
| NFPA 704 (fire diamond) | 0 1 0 COR |
| Safety data sheet (SDS) | External MSDS |
- Except where otherwise noted, data are given for materials in their standard state (at 25 °C [77 °F], 100 kPa). verify (what is ?) Infobox references

2,5-Dichlorophenol (2,5-DCP) is a chlorinated derivative of phenol with the molecular formula C_{6}H_{3}Cl_{2}OH. It is a white solid. Several isomers of dichlorophenol are known.

2,5-Dichlorophenol is of interest as a product of the biodegradation of the controversial herbicide dicamba.

== Cited sources ==
- Haynes, William M., ed. (2016). CRC Handbook of Chemistry and Physics (97th ed.). CRC Press. ISBN 9781498754293.
