= 2,4,6-Trichlorophenol =

- Chemical structure of 2,4,6-trichlorophenol

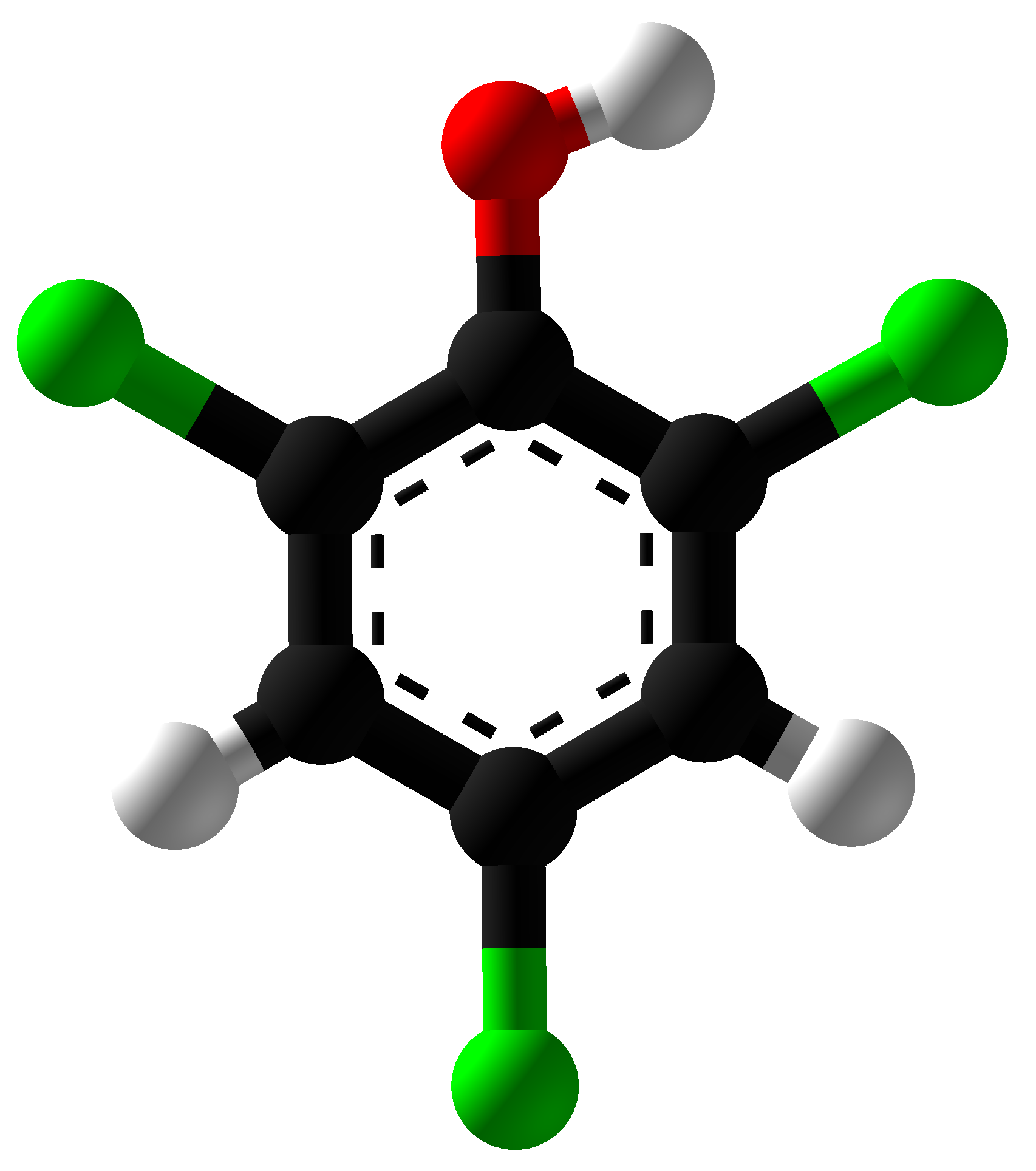

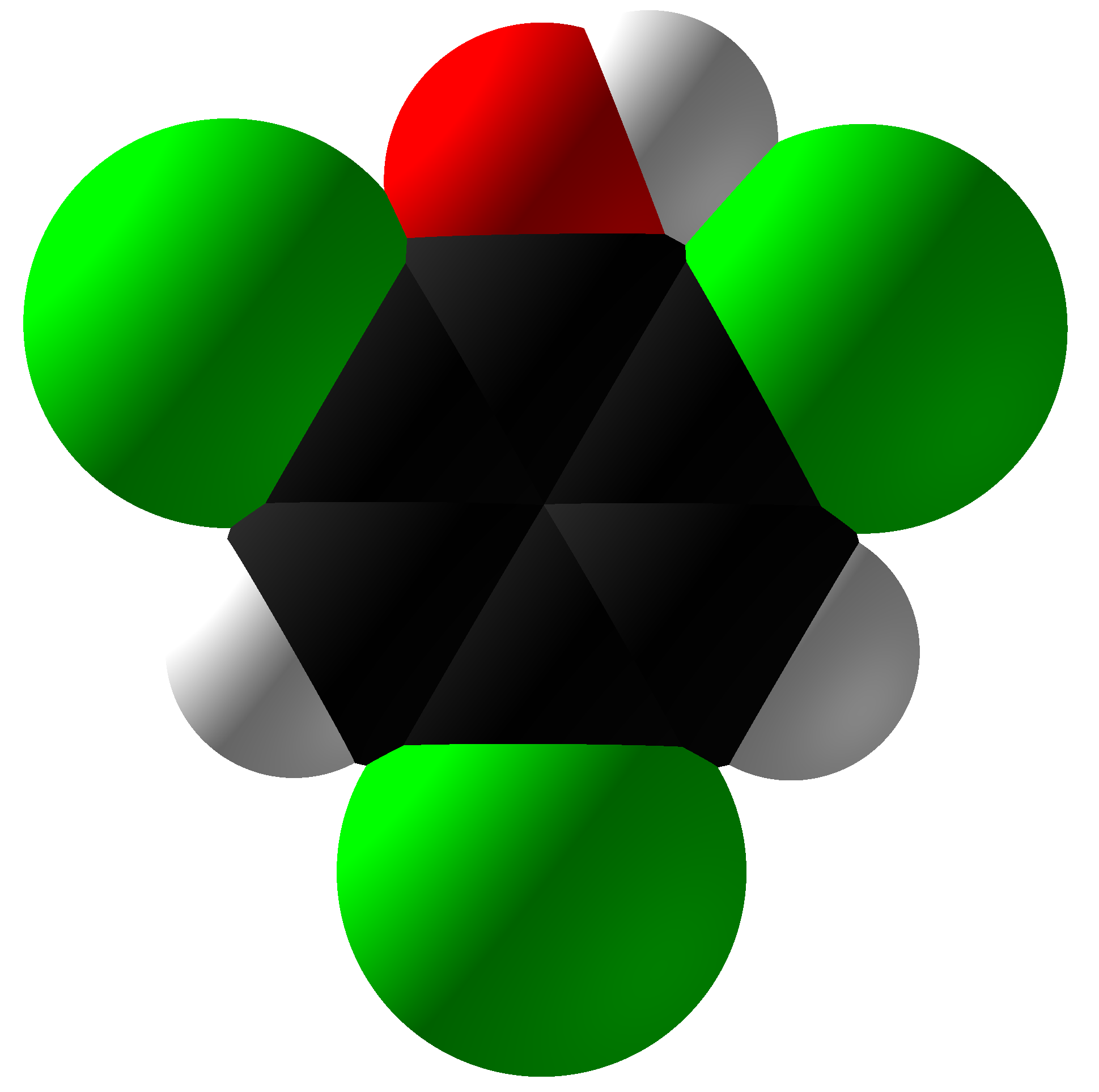

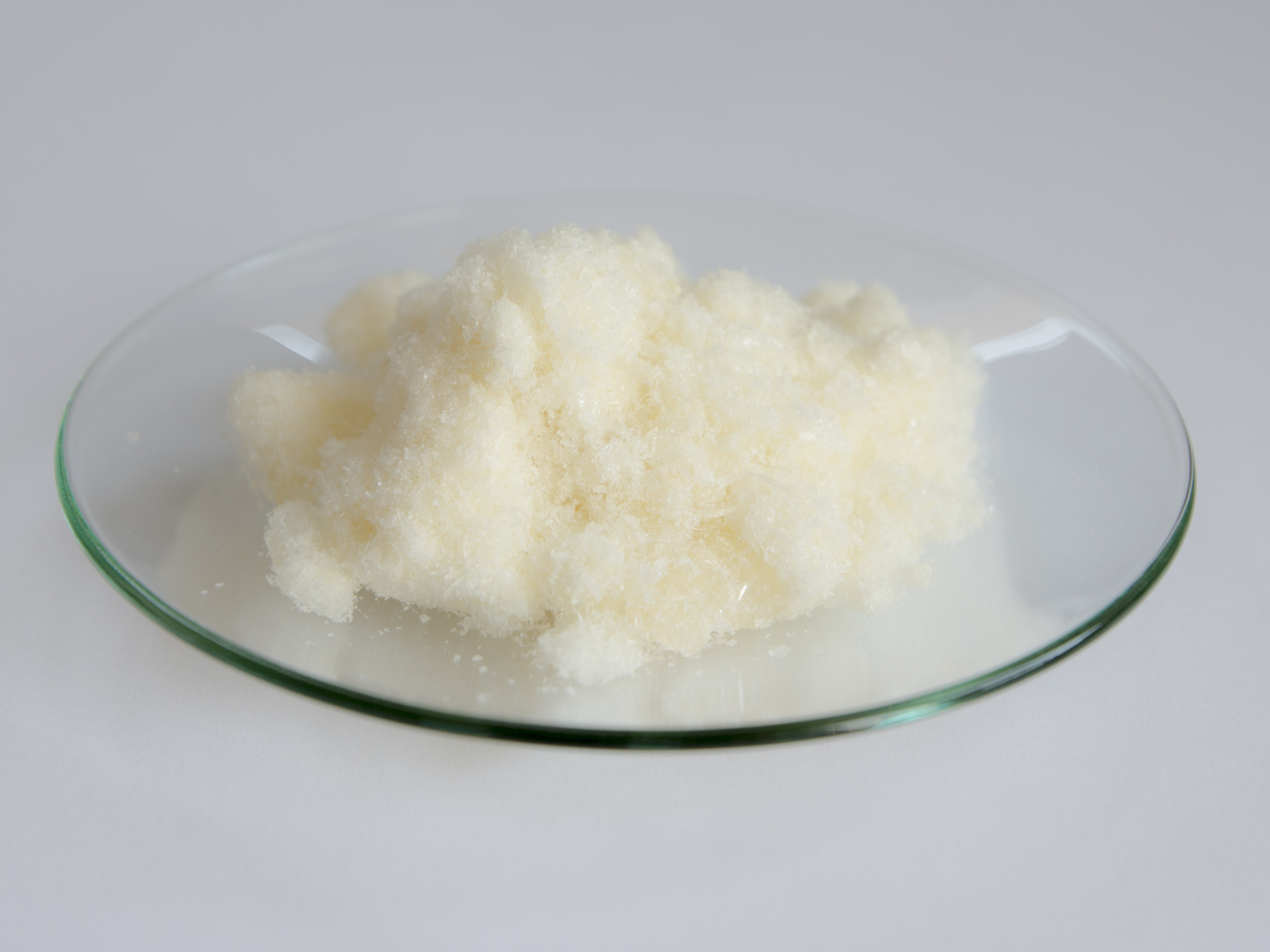

Names
- Preferred IUPAC name 2,4,6-Trichlorophenol

Identifiers
CAS Number	88-06-2
3D model (JSmol)	Interactive image
Beilstein Reference	776729
ChEBI	CHEBI:28755
ChEMBL	ChEMBL309917
ChemSpider	6648
ECHA InfoCard	100.001.633
EC Number	201-795-9
Gmelin Reference	3766
KEGG	C07098
PubChem CID	6914
RTECS number	SN1575000
UNII	MHS8C5BAUZ
UN number	2020
CompTox Dashboard (EPA)	DTXSID5021386
- InChI: InChI=1S/C6H3Cl3O/c7-3-1-4(8)6(10)5(9)2-3/h1-2,10H Key: LINPIYWFGCPVIE-UHFFFAOYSA-N
- SMILES: OC1=C(C=C(C=C1Cl)Cl)Cl

Properties
Chemical formula	C_{6}H_{2}Cl_{3}OH/C_{6}H_{3}Cl_{3}O
Molar mass	197.45 g/mol
Appearance	yellow-whitish lumps or powder
Density	1.4901 g/cm^{3} at 75 °C
Melting point	69.5 °C (157.1 °F; 342.6 K)
Boiling point	249 °C (480 °F; 522 K)
Solubility in water	0.069 g/100 g H_{2}O

Hazards
- GHS labelling
Pictograms	(GHS07: Exclamation mark) (GHS08: Health hazard) (GHS09: Environmental hazard)
Signal word	Warning
Hazard statements	H302, H315, H319, H351, H410
Precautionary statements	P201, P202, P264, P270, P273, P280, P281, P301+P312, P302+P352, P305+P351+P338, P308+P313, P321, P330, P332+P313, P337+P313, P362, P391, P405, P501
- Except where otherwise noted, data are given for materials in their standard state (at 25 °C [77 °F], 100 kPa). verify (what is ?) Infobox references

2,4,6-Trichlorophenol, also known as TCP, phenaclor, Dowicide 2S, Dowcide 2S, omal, is a chlorinated phenol that has been used as a fungicide, herbicide, insecticide, antiseptic, defoliant, and glue preservative. It is a clear to yellowish crystalline solid with a strong, phenolic odor. It decomposes on heating to produce toxic and corrosive fumes including hydrogen chloride and chlorine.

== Preparation ==
2,4,6-Trichlorophenol is produced industrially by the electrophilic chlorination of phenol:

== Applications ==
- 2,4,6-Trichlorophenol is used as an ingredient in chlornitrofen.
- Another use is in the synthesis of prochloraz.

== Health effects ==
In animal models, consumption of 2,4,6-trichlorophenol leads to an increased incidence of lymphomas, leukemia, and liver cancer. It is classified as Group B2 (probable human carcinogen) by the United States Environmental Protection Agency. The technical grade of this substance may contain polychlorinated dibenzodioxins (PCDDs), polychlorinated dibenzofurans (PCDFs), and other contaminants.

== Environmental effects ==
2,4,6-Trichlorophenol is an environmental pollutant that has been found in fresh water lakes such as the Great Lakes.

== See also ==
- Trichlorophenol (for other isomers).

== Cited sources ==
- Haynes, William M., ed. (2016). CRC Handbook of Chemistry and Physics (97th ed.). CRC Press. ISBN 9781498754293.
