= 2-Chlorophenol =

2-Chlorophenol
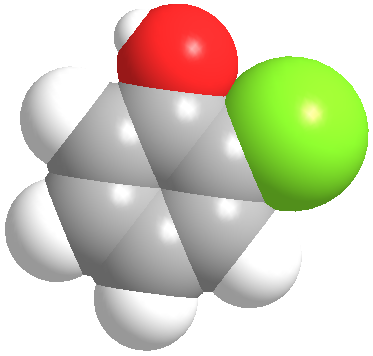
2-Chlorophenol

Names
- Preferred IUPAC name 2-Chlorophenol
- Other names o-Chlorophenol ortho-Chlorophenol; 2-Hydroxychlorobenzene

Identifiers
CAS Number	95-57-8
3D model (JSmol)	Interactive image
ChEBI	CHEBI:47083
ChEMBL	ChEMBL108877
ChemSpider	13837686
DrugBank	DB03110
ECHA InfoCard	100.002.213
KEGG	C14219
PubChem CID	7245
UNII	K9KAV4K6BN
CompTox Dashboard (EPA)	DTXSID5021544
- InChI: InChI=1S/C6H5ClO/c7-5-3-1-2-4-6(5)8/h1-4,8H Key: ISPYQTSUDJAMAB-UHFFFAOYSA-N; InChI=1/C6H5ClO/c7-5-3-1-2-4-6(5)8/h1-4,8H Key: ISPYQTSUDJAMAB-UHFFFAOYAM
- SMILES: Oc1ccccc1Cl

Properties
Chemical formula	C_{6}H_{5}ClO
Molar mass	128.56 g·mol^{−1}
Appearance	colorless liquid
Density	1.2634 g/cm^{3} at 20 °C
Melting point	8 °C (46 °F; 281 K)
Boiling point	173.4 °C (344.1 °F; 446.5 K)
Solubility in water	20 g/L at 20 °C
Solubility	Soluble in ethanol, diethyl ether, benzene
Vapor pressure	0.308 kPa
Acidity (pK_{a})	8.56
Magnetic susceptibility (χ)	−77.3·10^{−6} cm^{3}/mol
Refractive index (n_{D})	1.5524
Viscosity	3.59 mPa·s

Thermochemistry
Heat capacity (C)	188.7 J·mol^{−1}·K^{−1}
Enthalpy of fusion (Δ_{f}H^{⦵}_{fus})	13.0 kJ·mol^{−1}

Hazards
- Occupational safety and health (OHS/OSH)
Main hazards	Corrosive – causes burns
Flash point	64 °C (147 °F; 337 K)
Autoignition temperature	550 °C (1,022 °F; 823 K)
Safety data sheet (SDS)	MSDS

Related compounds
Related aromatic hydrocarbons	benzene phenol chlorobenzene
- Except where otherwise noted, data are given for materials in their standard state (at 25 °C [77 °F], 100 kPa). verify (what is ?) Infobox references

2-Chlorophenol or ortho-chlorophenol is an organic compound with the formula C_{6}H_{4}ClOH. It is one of three isomers of monochlorophenol. Aside from occasional use as a disinfectant, it has few applications. It is an intermediate in the polychlorination of phenol. 2-Chlorophenol is a colorless liquid, although commercial samples are often yellow or amber-colored. It has an unpleasant, penetrating (carbolic) odor. It is poorly soluble in water.

== See also ==
- Chlorophenol

== Cited sources ==
- Haynes, William M., ed. (2016). CRC Handbook of Chemistry and Physics (97th ed.). CRC Press. ISBN 9781498754293.
