= List of Governor General's Medals in Architecture =

Source: Royal Architectural Institute of Canada / Canada Council for the Arts

Year	Architect	Project Name	Project Location - City or Area	Project Location - Province or Other	Award
1982	Stevenson Raines Barret Christie Hutton Seton & Partners	Calgary International Airport	Calgary	AB	Medal
1982	Thompson Berwick Pratt & Partners	Canadian Forces Officers’ Candidate School	Chilliwack	BC	Medal
1982	Zeidler Roberts Partnership / William Kessler & Associates Giffels Associates	Detroit Receiving Hospital	Detroit	MI, USA	Medal
1982	Lett Smith Architects	Grand Theatre	London	ON	Medal
1982	Phillip H. Carter	Markham Community Library	Markham	ON	Medal
1982	Gordon Atkins & Associates	Stoney Tribal Administration Building	Morley	AB	Medal
1982	Adamson Associates Architects	North York City Hall	North York	ON	Medal
1982	The Thom Partnership	Atria North	North York	ON	Medal
1982	B. James Wensley & Associates	The Coquitlam Centre	Port Coquitlam	BC	Medal
1982	Young & Wright Architects	Levi Strauss Manufacturing Building	Stoney Creek	ON	Medal
1982	Arthur Erickson Architects	Yorkdale Rapid Transit Station	Toronto	ON	Medal
1982	Bregman & Hamann Architects / Zeidler Roberts Partnership	Eaton Centre	Toronto	ON	Medal
1982	Matsui Baer Vanstone Freeman Architects	Wallace Emerson Community Centre	Toronto	ON	Medal
1982	Moriyama and Teshima Architects	Goh Ohn Bell	Toronto	ON	Medal
1982	Moriyama and Teshima Architects	Metropolitan Toronto Library	Toronto	ON	Medal
1982	Arthur Erickson Architects	Robson Square	Vancouver	BC	Medal
1982	Musson Cattel & Partners	Daon Centre	Vancouver	BC	Medal
1982	Peter Cardew / RIA Architects	False Creek Townhouses	Vancouver	BC	Medal
1982	Thompson Berwick Pratt & Partners	CBC Broadcasting Centre	Vancouver	BC	Medal
1982	IKOY Architects	IKOY Office Building	Winnipeg	MB	Medal
1983	J. H. Cook Architects	Corporate Head Office for Nova	Calgary	AB	Medal
1983	Jodoin Lamarre Pratte	Chapelle de Sacré Coeur	Montréal	QC	Medal
1983	Jim Strasman Architects	Wandrich Residence	Stoney Lake	ON	Medal
1983	DuBois Plumb & Associates	The Oaklands	Toronto	ON	Medal
1983	Boudrias, Boudreau, St. Jean	Usine de pompage d’eau brute	unknown	unknown	Medal
1983	Arthur Erickson Architects	Museum of Anthropology	Vancouver	BC	Medal
1983	Bruno Freshchi, Architect	Ping Pong 1	Vancouver	BC	Medal
1983	James Cheng Architects	Willow Court, Willow Arbour, and Heather Terrace	Vancouver	BC	Medal
1983	Russell Vandiver Architects	Multi-Tenant Research Building	Vancouver	BC	Medal
1986	John Hix Architect Ltd.	Quetico Wilderness Park Visitors Center	Atikokan	ON	Award
1986	Hugh McMillan Architects Ltd. / Radoslav Zuk, Visiting Architect	St. Stephen's Byzantine Ukrainian Catholic Church	Calgary	AB	Medal
1986	Merchant Chomik Architects	Wemyss/Carey Residence	Calgary	AB	Award
1986	Diamond, Myers and Wilkin Architects	Citadel Theatre	Edmonton	AB	Award
1986	Graham McCourt Architects	Alberta New Lab & Administration Buildings	Edmonton	AB	Award
1986	Maltby and Prins Architects	West Jasper Place Transit Center	Edmonton	AB	Award
1986	UHSC Architects Group Ltd. / Zeidler Roberts Partnership / Groves Palenstein Barton Irvine / Wood and Gardener Architects Ltd.	Walter C. MacKenzie Health Sciences Center	Edmonton	AB	Award
1986	Lambur Scott Architects Ltd.	Athabasca Delta Community School	Fort Chipewyan	AB	Award
1986	Graham McCourt Architects	Medicine Hat City Hall	Medicine Hat	AB	Medal
1986	The IKOY Partnership R.E. Hulbert & Associates	Northwest Leisure Center	Regina	SK	Award
1986	Moriyama & Teshima Architects / Townend, Stefura, Baleshta & Nicholls Architects	Science North	Sudbury	ON	Award
1986	A.J. Diamond & Partners	Metropolitan Toronto Central YMCA	Toronto	ON	Medal
1986	Zeidler Roberts Partnership	Queen's Quay Terminal	Toronto	ON	Medal
1986	Mathers & Haldenby Moffat Kinoshita Associates Inc.	Royal Ontario Museum Renovation and Expansion	Toronto	ON	Award
1986	Norman Grey-Noble / Thomas Moore Architects	Offices of Netspec Marketing Ltd.	Toronto	ON	Award
1986	Stephen G. McLaughlin, Commissioner of Planning & Development / Ken Greenberg, Program Manager of Urban Design Group, Department of Planning & Development	Architecture of the City	Toronto	ON	Award
1986	Gauthier. Guité. Roy. Architectes	Ensemble du Haut-Fourneau Forges du Saint-Maurice	Trois-Rivières	QC	Medal
1986	Brian MacKay-Lyons, Architect	A House on the Nova Scotia Coast	Upper Kingsburg	NS	Medal
1986	Roger Hughes Architects	Pacific Heights Housing Cooperative	Vancouver	BC	Medal
1986	Roger Hughes Architects	Sixth Estate	Vancouver	BC	Award
1986	Waisman Dewar Grout Carter Architects & Planners	Anchor Point	Vancouver	BC	Award
1986	Patkau & Associates	Pyrch Residence	Victoria	BC	Medal
1986	The Wade Williams Partnership	Pacific Forestry Center	Victoria	BC	Award
1986	Diran G. Loris, Architect	Tekeyan Cultural Centre	Ville St-Laurent	QC	Award
1986	Barton Myers Associates	Seagram Museum	Waterloo	ON	Medal
1986	The IKOY Partnership	Red River Community College: Auto/Diesel Shops	Winnipeg	MB	Medal
1990	Ron Keenberg	Bird Shack (part of duck-hunter conversationalist history)	Delta Marsh	MB	Award of Merit
1990	Mario V. Petrone, Petrone Architects	Poste de pompage Roland-Therrien	Longueuil	QC	Award of Merit
1990	Jones & Kirkland Architects	Mississauga City Hall	Mississauga	ON	Award of Merit
1990	L’Atelier Poirier Dépatie, architectes	Les Quartiers de l’Héritage Hutchison-Sherbrooke	Montréal	QC	Award of Merit
1990	Jacques Rousseau, architecte	La Maison Coloniale	Montréal	QC	Award of Merit
1990	The LeBlond Partnership, Architects & Planners	Head-Smashed-In Buffalo Jump Interpretive Centre	Porcupine Hills	AB	Medal for Excellence
1990	Gauthier. Guité. Roy Architectes Les Architectes D’Anjou, Moison et Associés	Le Faubourg Laudance-Phase 1	St-Foy	QC	Award of Merit
1990	Li Architect Inc. / Daniel Li	Harbour Terrace	Toronto	ON	Award of Merit
1990	Moriyama & Teshima Architects	Bay Bloor Radio	Toronto	ON	Award of Merit
1990	Patkau Architects	Porter/Vandenbosch Residence	Toronto	ON	Award of Merit
1990	Bing Thom Architects Inc.	Point Grey Road Condominiums	Vancouver	BC	Medal for Excellence
1990	Hughes Baldwin Architects	Seascapes	Vancouver	BC	Medal for Excellence
1990	Bing Thom Architects Inc.	False Creek Yacht Club	Vancouver	BC	Award of Merit
1990	Henriquez and Partners Architects / Toby Russell Buckwell & Partners	Sinclair Centre	Vancouver	BC	Award of Merit
1990	Patkau Architects	Appleton Residence	Victoria	BC	Medal for Excellence
1992	Patkau Architects Inc.	Seabird Island School	Agassiz	BC	Medal for Excellence
1992	Carmen Corneil/ Architect	Offices For OPSEU	North York	ON	Medal for Excellence
1992	Brigitte Shim Architect	Garden Pavilion and Reflecting Pool	North York	ON	Award of Merit
1992	Barry Johns Architects Ltd	Advanced Technology Centre	Edmonton	AB	Award of Merit
1992	Brian MacKay-Lyons Architecture + Urban Design	Maritime Realism: North End Infill	Halifax	NS	Medal for Excellence
1992	MacFawn and Rogers Architects Limited	HMCS Sackville Interpretation Centre	Halifax	NS	Award of Merit
1992	Peter Rose Architect	Canadian Centre for Architecture	Montreal	QC	Award of Merit
1992	Les architects Boutros et Pratte	Le 110, Ste-Thérèse	Montréal	QC	Award of Merit
1992	Les architectes Gagnier & Gagnier	Pavillon de la piscine Versailles	Pierrefonds	QC	Award of Merit
1992	Moshe Safdie, Architect / Belzile, Brassard Gallienne, Lavoie / Sungur Incesulu/Desnoyers Mercure et Associés	Musée de la civilisation	Quebec City	QC	Medal for Excellence
1992	Hughes Baldwin Architects	Rogers Elementary School	Saanich	BC	Award of Merit
1992	Barton Myers Architect, Inc / Kuwabara Payne McKenna Blumberg Architects	Woodsworth College	Toronto	ON	Medal for Excellence
1992	Kuwabara Payne McKenna Blumberg Associated Architects	King James Place	Toronto	ON	Award of Merit
1994	Louis-Paul Lemieux, architecte (Atelier KAOS) / Gilles Chagnon, architecte	Centre Financier le Boulevard	Drummondville	QC	Award of Merit
1994	Brigitte Shim Architect and Howard Sutcliffe	House on Horse Lake	Haliburton	ON	Award of Merit
1994	Kuwabara Payne McKenna Blumberg Architects	Kitchener City Hall & Civic Centre	Kitchener	ON	Medal for Excellence
1994	Dan S. Hanganu architectes/Provencher Roy architectes	Pointe-à-Callière, musée d’archéologie et d’histoire de Montréal	Montréal	QC	Medal for Excellence
1994	Cardinal Hardy et associés, architectes	Plan d’aménagement 1992 Vieux-Port de Montréal	Montréal	QC	Award of Merit
1994	Jodoin Lamarre Pratte & associés / LeMoyne Lapointe Magne architectes	Musée McCord d’histoire canadienne	Montréal	QC	Award of Merit
1994	Richard de la Riva architecte	Les habitations Georges-Vanier	Montréal	QC	Award of Merit
1994	Julian Jacobs Architects	Emery Yard	North York	ON	Award of Merit
1994	Cormier, Cohen, Davies, architectes	Centre d’interprétation du Bourg de Pabos	Pabos Mills	QC	Award of Merit
1994	Richard Henriquez / Laszlo Nemeth Associates Architects in Joint Venture	Environmental Sciences Building	Peterborough	ON	Medal for Excellence
1994	Stephen Teeple Architect	Trent University Childcare Centre	Peterborough	ON	Award of Merit
1994	Brian MacKay-Lyons Architecture and Urban Design	Leahey House	Pugwash NS	NS	Award of Merit
1994	A.J. Diamond, Donald Schmitt and Company	Richmond Hill Central Library	Richmond Hill	ON	Award of Merit
1994	Kuwabara Payne McKenna Blumberg Architects	Reisman-Jenkinson Residence & Studio	Richmond Hill	ON	Award of Merit
1994	Patkau Architects Inc.	Newton Library	Surrey	BC	Medal for Excellence
1994	Brigitte Shim Architect and Howard Sutcliffe	Laneway House	Toronto	ON	Medal for Excellence
1994	Oleson Worland Architects	North Toronto Memorial Community Centre	Toronto	ON	Medal for Excellence
1994	Baird/Sampson Architects (Design Architects) / The Webb Zerafa Menkes Housden Partnership	Bay Adelaide Park	Toronto	ON	Award of Merit
1994	Bregman + Hamann / A.J. Diamond, Donald Schmitt and Company	Earth Sciences Center, University of Toronto	Toronto	ON	Award of Merit
1994	Larry McFarland Architects Limited	First Nations Longhouse University of BC	Vancouver	BC	Award of Merit
1997	Zeidler Roberts Partnership/Architects	Columbus Centre of Marine Research and Exploration	Baltimore	MD, USA	Award of Merit
1997	Busby Bridger Architects	Headquarters for the A.P.E.G.B.C.	Burnaby	BC	Award of Merit
1997	Kuwabara Payne McKenna Blumberg Architects	Joseph S. Stauffer Library	Kingston	ON	Award of Merit
1997	Kuwabara Payne McKenna Blumberg Architects	Grand Valley Institution for Women	Kitchener	ON	Award of Merit
1997	Les architects Boutros + Pratte	Plaza Laurier	Montréal	QC	Medal for Excellence
1997	Saucier + Perrotte architectes	Usine C / Carbone 14	Montréal	QC	Award of Merit
1997	Patkau Architects	Barnes House	Nanaimo	BC	Award of Merit
1997	Busby Bridger Architects and Frits de Vries Architect	North Vancouver Municipal Hall Renovation and Expansion	North Vancouver	BC	Award of Merit
1997	A.J. Diamond, Donald Schmitt and Company	York University Student Centre	North York	ON	Award of Merit
1997	Trame Groupe Conseil / Bart, Carrier, Gauthier / Fortier et associés	U.Q.A.T. Campus de Rouyn-Noranda	Rouyn-Noranda	QC	Award of Merit
1997	Brigitte Shim Architect and Howard Sutcliffe	Craven Road House	Toronto	ON	Award of Merit
1997	Kuwabara Payne McKenna Blumberg Architects	Design Exchange	Toronto	ON	Award of Merit
1997	Montgomery and Sisam Architects	Humber River Bicycle Pedestrian Bridge	Toronto	ON	Award of Merit
1997	Cormier, Cohen, Davies, architectes	Parc de l’aventure basque en Amérique	Trois-Pistoles	QC	Award of Merit
1997	Pierre Thibault Architecte	Théâtre de la Dame de Coeur et C.H.A.P.E.A.U.	Upton	QC	Medal for Excellence
1997	Hughes Baldwin Architects	Renfrew Branch Library	Vancouver	BC	Award of Merit
1997	Patkau Architects	Canadian Clay and Glass Gallery	Waterloo	ON	Medal for Excellence
1997	Stephen Teeple Architects	Burt C. Matthews Hall Addition	Waterloo	ON	Award of Merit
1997	Sturgess Architecture and FSC Manasc Architects	Yukon Visitor Reception Centre	Whitehorse	YT	Medal for Excellence
1997	Brian MacKay-Lyons Architecture + Urban Design	House on the Nova Scotia Coast #12		NS	Medal for Excellence
1999	Julien Architectes et Les architectes Plante et Julien	Centre d’intérêt minier de Chibougamau	Chibougamau	QC	Medal for Excellence
1999	MacLennan Jaunkalns Miller Architects Ltd	Rotary Park Pool	Etobicoke	ON	Award of Merit
1999	Blouin IKOY & Associés	National Archives of Canada	Gatineau	QC	Award of Merit
1999	Saucier + Perrotte architectes	Cinémathèque québécoise	Montreal	QC	Award of Merit
1999	Dan S. Hanganu, Architectes	Pavillon de design de UQAM	Montréal	QC	Award of Merit
1999	Saia et Barbarese, architectes	Centre sportif de la Petite-Bourgogne	Montreal	QC	Medal for Excellence
1999	Busby + Associates Architects	Revenue Canada Building	Surrey	BC	Award of Merit
1999	Levitt Goodman Architects Ltd.	Strachan House	Toronto	ON	Medal for Excellence
1999	Shim-Sutcliffe Architects / G+G Partnership Architects	Ledbury Park	Toronto	ON	Medal for Excellence
1999	Peter Cardew Architects	University of British Columbia - The Morris and Helen Belkin Art Gallery	Vancouver	BC	Medal for Excellence
2002	Ian MacDonald Architect Inc.	House in Mulmur Hills #1	Dufferin County	ON	Medal
2002	Teeple Architects Inc.	Addition to the Albert Thornbrough Building, College of Physical &Engineering Science	Guelph	ON	Medal
2002	Shim-Sutcliffe Architects	Moorelands Camp Dining Hall	Lake Kawagama, Dorset	ON	Medal
2002	Architectes Lemay et associés	Agmont America Factory	Montreal	QC	Medal
2002	Dan S. Hanganu, architects / Provencher Roy et associés architects	Relogement du Centre d’archives de Montreal	Montreal	QC	Medal
2002	saucier + perrotte architectes	First Nations Garden Pavilion	Montreal	QC	Medal
2002	Saia Barbarese / Laverdière Giguêre, architects	Benny Farm Housing	Montreal	QC	Medal
2002	Architects Alliance / Busby + Associate Architects	York University Computer Science Building	North York	ON	Medal
2002	Brian MacKay-Lyons Architecture Urban Design	House on the Nova Scotia Coast #22	Oxner's Head	NS	Medal
2002	Hotson Bakker / Kuwabara Payne McKenna Blumberg Associated Architects	Richmond City Hall	Richmond	BC	Medal
2002	Architects Kongats Phillips	Centennial College Student Centre	Scarborough	ON	Medal
2002	Patkau Architects	Strawberry Vale School	Victoria	BC	Medal
2004	Busby + Associate Architects	Brentwood Skytrain Station	Burnaby	BC	Medal
2004	Ian MacDonald Architect Inc.	House in Erin	Erin	ON	Medal
2004	Kuwabara Payne McKenna Blumberg Architects	James Stewart Centre for Mathematics, McMaster University	Hamilton	ON	Medal
2004	Busby + Associates Architects	Nicola Valley Institute of Technology	Merritt	BC	Medal
2004	Shim Sutcliffe Architects	Muskoka Boathouse	Muskoka	ON	Medal
2004	Patkau Architects Inc.	Agosta House	San Juan Island	WA, USA	Medal
2004	Shim Sutcliffe Architects	Weathering Steel House	Toronto	ON	Medal
2004	Henriquez Partners Architects	Lore Krill Housing Co-op and City of Vancouver Parkade	Vancouver	BC	Medal
2004	Patkau Architects Inc.	Shaw House	Vancouver	BC	Medal
2006	atelier TAG et Jodoin Lamarre Pratte et Associés Architectes en consortium	Bibliothèque Municipale de Châteauguay	Châteauguay	QC	Medal
2006	Atelier in situ	« Structures d'accueil des jardins de Métis »	Grand-Métis	QC	Medal
2006	Baird Sampson Neuert Architects	Erindale Hall, University of Toronto at Mississauga	Mississauga	ON	Medal
2006	Les architectes FABG	115 Studios – Cirque du Soleil	Montreal	QC	Medal
2006	Lapointe Magne + Ædifica	Institut de tourisme et d'hôtellerie du Québec	Montreal	QC	Medal
2006	Lapointe Magne et associés	Théâtre Espace Libre	Montreal	QC	Medal
2006	Cormier, Cohen, Davies architectes	Unity 2	Montreal	QC	Medal
2006	Florian Maurer Architect, MRAIC	Maurer House	Naramata	BC	Medal
2006	atelier TAG et Jodoin Lamarre Pratte et Associés Architectes en consortium	Théâtre du Vieux-Terrebonne	Terrebonne	QC	Medal
2006	Hariri Pontarini Architects, Robbie/Young + Wright Architects In Joint Venture	Schulich School of Business, York University	Toronto	ON	Medal
2006	Saucier + Perrotte architectes	The Perimeter Institute for Theoretical Physics	Waterloo	ON	Medal
2006	Smith Carter Architects and Engineers Incorporated	SC3-Smith Carter Workplace	Winnipeg	MB	Medal
2008	Saucier + Perrotte architectes	Communication, Culture and Technology Building, University of Toronto Mississauga	Mississauga	ON	Medal
2008	Hotson Bakker Boniface Haden Architects	Nk’Mip Desert Cultural Centre	Osoyoos	BC	Medal
2008	Moriyama & Teshima Architects / Griffiths Rankin Cook Architects: in joint venture	New Canadian War Museum	Ottawa	ON	Medal
2008	Teeple Architects Inc. and Shore Tilbe Irwin & Partners, Architects, Architects in Joint Venture	Trent University Chemical Sciences Building	Peterborough	ON	Medal
2008	Kuwabara Payne McKenna Blumberg Architects & Goldsmith Borgal & Company Ltd. Architects, Architects in Joint Venture	Canada's National Ballet School Project Grand Jeté	Toronto	ON	Medal
2008	Ian MacDonald Architect Inc.	House at 4a Wychwood Park	Toronto	ON	Medal
2008	Teeple Architects Inc.	Scarborough Chinese Baptist Church	Toronto	ON	Medal
2008	architectsAlliance & Behnisch Architekten	Terrence Donnelly Centre for Cellular and Biomolecular Research, University of Toronto	Toronto	ON	Medal
2008	Le Groupe Arcop	Jaypee Institute of Information Technology	Uttar Pradesh	India	Medal
2008	Lang Wilson Practice in Architecture Culture Inc.	ROAR_one	Vancouver	BC	Medal
2008	Patkau Architects	Gleneagles Community Centre	West Vancouver	BC	Medal
2008	Patkau / LM Architectural Group	Winnipeg Centennial Library Addition	Winnipeg	MB	Medal
2010	Baird Sampson Neuert Architects	French River Visitor Centre	Alban	ON	Medal
2010	Patkau / Croft Pelletier / Menkès Shooner Dagenais architectes associés	La Grande Bibliothèque du Québec	Montreal	QC	Medal
2010	Saucier + Perrotte architectes	Scandinave Les Bains Vieux-Montréal	Montreal	QC	Medal
2010	Saucier + Perrotte architectes	Prud'Homme - Dulude Residence	Mont-Tremblant	QC	Medal
2010	Kohn Shnier Architects	Prefab Cottage for Two Families	Muskoka	ON	Medal
2010	DAOUST LESTAGE inc. architecture design urbain	Promenade Samuel-De Champlain	Quebec City	QC	Medal
2010	Allaire Courchesne Dupuis Frappier, architectes	St-Germain Aqueducts and Sewers	St-Hubert	QC	Medal
2010	gh3	Photographer's Studio Over a Boat House	Stony Lake	ON	Medal
2010	Shim-Sutcliffe Architects Inc.	Corkin Gallery	Toronto	ON	Medal
2010	Shim-Sutcliffe Architects Inc.	Ravine Guest House	Toronto	ON	Medal
2010	Shim-Sutcliffe Architects Inc.	Craven Road Studio	Toronto	ON	Medal
2010	Kuwabara Payne McKenna Blumberg Architects	Royal Conservatory of Music - TELUS Centre for Performance and Learning	Toronto	ON	Medal
2012	Architectes de l’urgence du Canada	Mission Kitcisakik	Kitcisakik	QC	Medal
2012	RDH Architects Inc	The Mississauga Public Library Project	Mississauga	ON	Medal
2012	Kongats Architects	Terrence Donnelly Health Sciences Complex, University of Toronto Mississauga	Mississauga	ON	Medal
2012	Daoust Lestage Inc.	Place des Festivals et vitrines habitées, Quartier des Spectacles	Montréal	QC	Medal
2012	RDH Architects Inc	Newmarket Operations Centre	Newmarket	ON	Medal
2012	Maki and Associates | Moriyama & Teshima Architects	Delegation of the Ismaili Imamat: Architecture of Peace and Plurality	Ottawa	ON	Medal
2012	office of mcfarlane biggar ARCHITECTS + DESIGNERS inc.	College of New Caledonia – Technical Trades Centre – Quesnel	Quesnel	BC	Medal
2012	Patkau Architects Inc	Linear House	Salt Spring Island	BC	Medal
2012	MacKay-Lyons Sweetapple Architects	Cliff House	Tomlee Head	NS	Medal
2012	Shim-Sutcliffe Architects Inc.	The Integral House	Toronto	ON	Medal
2012	Kuwabara Payne McKenna Blumberg	Vaughan City Hall	Vaughan	ON	Medal
2012	5468796 Architecture Inc.	Bloc_10	Winnipeg	MB	Medal
2014	Atelier TAG and Jodoin Lamarre Pratte architectes in consortium	Raymond-Lévesque Public Library	Longueuil	QC	Medal
2014	Michael Green Architecture	North Vancouver City Hall	North Vancouver	BC	Medal
2014	Patkau Architects Inc	Tula House	Quadra Island	BC	Medal
2014	RDH Architects Inc./ Shoalts and Zaback Architects Ltd.	The Bloor Gladstone Library	Toronto	ON	Medal
2014	Teeple Architects Inc.	60 Richmond East Housing Co-Operative	Toronto	ON	Medal
2014	Kongats Architects	Centennial College Athletic and Wellness Centre	Toronto	ON	Medal
2014	KPMB Architects	Joseph L. Rotman School of Management Expansion, University of Toronto	Toronto	ON	Medal
2014	Shim-Sutcliffe Architects Inc.	Residence for the Sisters of St. Joseph of Toronto	Toronto	ON	Medal
2014	Saucier + Perrotte Architectes / Hughes Condon Marler Architects	Faculty of Pharmaceutical Sciences and Centre for Drug Research and Development, University of British Columbia	Vancouver	BC	Medal
2014	Les architectes FABG	Conversion of Mies van der Rohe gas station	Verdun	QC	Medal
2014	KPMB Architects	Centre for International Governance Innovation (CIGI) Campus	Waterloo	ON	Medal
2014	5468796 Architecture Inc.	OMS Stage	Winnipeg	MB	Medal
2016	Fowler Bauld & Mitchell Ltd. / schmidt hammer lassen architects	Halifax Central Library	Halifax	NS	Medal
2016	Sturgess Architecture	Glacier Skywalk	Jasper	AB	Medal
2016	Consortium - ABCP architecture / Anne Carrier architecture	The Head Office of Caisse Desjardins de Lévis	Lévis	QC	Medal
2016	Shim-Sutcliffe Architects Inc.	Wong Dai Sin Temple	Markham	ON	Medal
2016	Hemsworth Architecture	BC Passive House Factory	Pemberton	BC	Medal
2016	Michael Green Architecture	Wood Innovation and Design Centre	Prince George	BC	Medal
2016	PLANT Architect Inc. in joint venture with Perkins + Will Canada (formerly Shore Tilbe Irwin & Partners Inc.)	Nathan Phillips Square Revitalization	Toronto	ON	Medal
2016	MacLennan Jaunkalns Miller Architects	Regent Park Aquatic Centre	Toronto	ON	Medal
2016	Stantec Architecture / KPMB Architects (Planning, Design and Compliance Architects) and HDR Architecture / Diamond Schmitt Architects (Design, Build, Finance and Maintain Architects)	Bridgepoint Active Healthcare	Toronto	ON	Medal
2016	Paul Laurendeau | François R. Beauchesne | Architects in consortium	Amphithéâtre Cogeco	Trois-Rivières	QC	Medal
2016	Michael Green Architecture – project begun at mcfarlane | green | biggar architecture + design	Ronald McDonald House BC & Yukon	Vancouver	BC	Medal
2016	Patkau Architects Inc. / LM Architectural Group	University of Manitoba ARTlab	Winnipeg	MB	Medal
2018	5468796 Architecture	Parallelogram House	East St. Paul	MB	Medal
2018	gh3	Borden Park Pavilion	Edmonton	AB	Medal
2018	Office of mcfarlane biggar architects + designers (omb). The project commenced as predecessor firm mcfarlane green biggar Architecture + Design	Fort McMurray International Airport	Fort McMurray	AB	Medal
2018	Omar Gandhi Architect in collaboration with Design Base 8 (New York City)	Rabbit Snare Gorge	Inverness	NS	Medal
2018	Saucier+Perrotte Architectes and HCMA	Complexe Sportif Saint-Laurent	Montreal	QC	Medal
2018	Atelier TAG et Jodoin Lamarre Pratte Architectes en consortium	Michal and Renata Hornstein Pavilion for Peace	Montreal	QC	Medal
2018	Saucier+Perrotte Architectes and HCMA	Stade de Soccer de Montréal	Montreal	QC	Medal
2018	MacKay-Lyons Sweetapple Architects	Two Hulls House	Port Mouton	NS	Medal
2018	Chevalier Morales Architectes	Maison de la littérature	Quebec City	QC	Medal
2018	Patkau Architects Inc. / Kearns Mancini Architects Inc. Associated Architects	Fort York Visitor Centre	Toronto	ON	Medal
2018	Hariri Pontarini Architects	Casey House	Toronto	ON	Medal
2018	Patkau Architects	Audain Art Museum	Whistler	BC	Medal
2020	RDH Architects (RDHA)	The Springdale Library & Komagata Maru Park	Brampton	ON	Medal
2020	Chevalier Morales in consortium with DMA architectes	Drummondville Library	Drummondville	QC	Medal
2020	gh3 architecture	Borden Park Natural Swimming Pool	Edmonton	AB	Medal
2020	SHAPE Architecture with PECHET Studio and Group 2 Architects	South Haven Centre for Remembrance	Edmonton	AB	Medal
2020	gh3 architecture	RTC 03	Edmonton	AB	Medal
2020	Shim-Sutcliffe Architects Inc.	Lake Kawagama Retreat	Kawagama Lake	ON	Medal
2020	Hariri Pontarini Architects	Bahá'í Temple of South America	Santiago	Chile	Medal
2020	KPMB Architects and Architecture49	Remai Modern	Saskatoon	SK	Medal
2020	Atelier TAG in consortium with Jodoin Lamarre Pratte Architects	Gilles-Vigneault Performance Hall	St. Jérôme	QC	Medal
2020	Patkau Architects	Polygon Gallery	Vancouver	BC	Medal
2020	Michael Green Architecture	The Dock Building	Vancouver	BC	Medal
2020	MJMA and Acton Ostry Architects	University of British Columbia Aquatic Centre	Vancouver	BC	Medal
2022	la Shed Architecture	Les Rochers	Bassin	QC	Medal
2022	RDH Architects (RDHA)	The Idea Exchange Old Post Office	Galt	ON	Medal
2022	MacKay-Lyons Sweetapple Architects Ltd	Village at the End of the World	Kingsburg	NS	Medal
2022	Shim-Sutcliffe Architects	Point William Cottage	Muskoka Lakes	ON	Medal
2022	KPMB Architects	The Brearley School	New York	NY, USA	Medal
2022	KPMB Architects	Julis Romo Rabinowitz Building & Louis A. Simpson International Building, Princeton University	Princeton	NJ, USA	Medal
2022	Provencher Roy | GLCRM Architectes	Reception Pavilion of the Quebec National Assembly	Quebec City	QC	Medal
2022	Hariri Pontarini Architects	Tom Patterson Theatre	Stratford	ON	Medal
2022	gh3* | R.V. Anderson Associates Limited	Cherry Street Stormwater Facility	Toronto	ON	Medal
2022	BDP Quadrangle	60-80 Atlantic Avenue	Toronto	ON	Medal
2022	Formline Architecture	Indian Residential School History and Dialogue Centre	Vancouver	BC	Medal
2022	Public City Architecture Inc.	Forest Pavilion	Winnipeg	MB	Medal
2024	Perkins&Will	SFU Stadium	Burnaby	BC	Medal
2024	Modern Office of Design + Architecture (MODA)	GROW	Calgary	AB	Medal
2024	FBM Architecture | Interior Design	Cabot Cliffs: Cliffs Residences, Halfway Hut, and Pro Shop	Cape Breton	NS	Medal
2024	Agence Spatiale | BGLA Architecture | APPAREIL Architecture	École de l'Étincelle, un Lab-École	Chicoutimi	QC	Medal
2024	Kongats Architects	King City Public Library and Seniors Centre	King City	ON	Medal
2024	MJMA Architecture & Design	Churchill Meadows Community Centre and Sports Park	Mississauga	ON	Medal
2024	Lemay	Théâtre de Verdure	Montreal	QC	Medal
2024	Suulin Architects Inc.	31 Scarsdale Road	North York	ON	Medal
2024	MJMA Architecture & Design | Raimondo + Associates Architects	Neil Campbell Rowing Centre	St. Catharines	ON	Medal
2024	Williamson Williamson Inc.	Garden Laneway House	Toronto	ON	Medal
2024	5468796 Architecture	Pumphouse	Winnipeg	MB	Medal
2026	Oxbow Architecture with Richard Kroeker	Muscowpetung Powwow Arbour	Muscowpetung Saulteaux Nation	SK	Medal
2026	Chevalier Morales architectes and Brian Eldsen Burrows Architecte – Le Groupe Architex	900 Saint-Jacques	Montreal	QC	Medal
2026	Shim-Sutcliffe Architects & Atelier Ace	Ace Hotel Toronto	Toronto	ON	Medal
2026	Patkau Architects	Arbour House	Vancouver	BC	Medal
2026	MacKay-Lyons Sweetapple Architects	Hilltop Cottage	undisclosed	NB	Medal
2026	Patkau Architects	Kìwekì Point	Ottawa	ON	Medal
2026	gh3*	O-day’min Park Pavilion	Edmonton	AB	Medal
2026	5468796 Architecture & Kasian Architecture, Interior Design and Planning	Parkade of the Future	Calgary	AB	Medal
2026	LGA Architectural Partners	Ulster House	Toronto	ON	Medal
2026	5468796 Architecture	Veil House	Winnipeg	MB	Medal
2026	gh3* (lead design architect) with S2 Architecture (prime consultant)	Windermere Fire Station #31	Edmonton	AB	Medal
