= Strawberry Vale Elementary School =

Location
- 4109 Rosedale Ave
- Coordinates: 48.47759°N 123.41710°W

Strawberry Vale Elementary School is a public primary school in the municipality of Saanich, in Victoria, British Columbia, Canada. The school is noted for its building, designed by Patkau Architects and completed in 1995.

== Architecture ==
Central to the school's design is an adjacent Garry Oak woodland. The school buildings are positioned on the site as to preserve and visually emphasize the grove.

The school's architecture is additionally noted for its environmentally conscious architecture, which was pioneering in the field of green design.
