= The Polygon Gallery =

Art gallery in North Vancouver, Canada

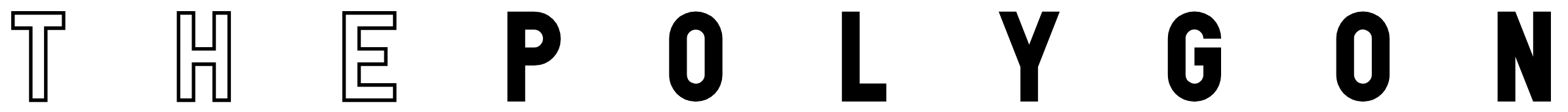

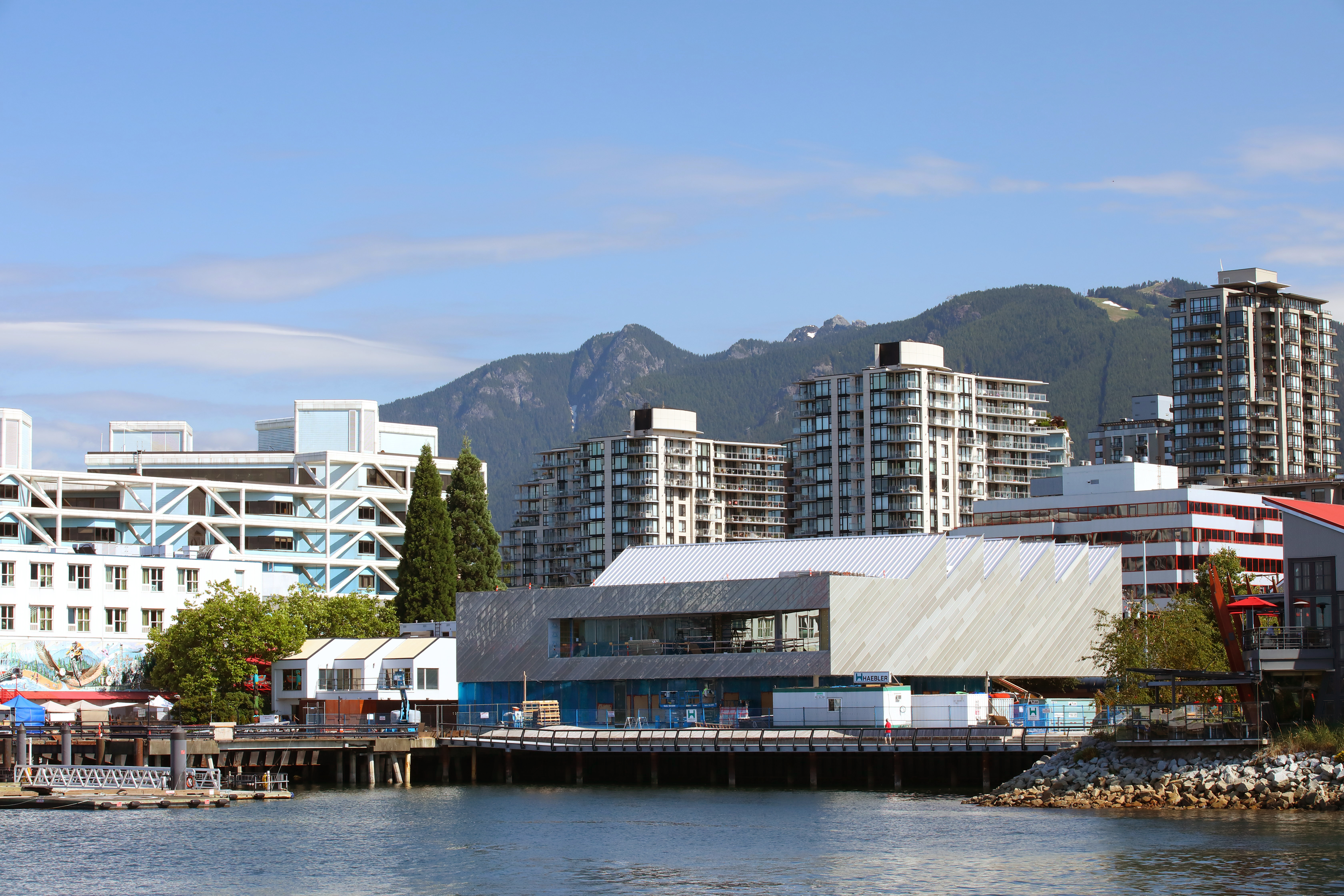
- Former name: Presentation House Gallery
- Location: North Vancouver, British Columbia
- Coordinates: 49.3103°N 123.0809°W
- Director: Reid Shier
- Architect: Patkau Architects
- Website: thepolygon.ca

The Polygon Gallery (formerly known as the Presentation House Gallery) is an art gallery in North Vancouver, British Columbia, Canada. It is the largest non-profit photographic gallery in Western Canada and has operated since 1981.

Work began on the new gallery in early 2016, which was designed by Patkau Architects. It was built on the former grounds of the BC Rail North Vancouver station. Costing $18 million, the gallery opened to the public on November 18, 2017. The Polygon Gallery consists of 25,000-square-feet of exhibit space across two levels with a café and gift shop.
