= McEwen School of Architecture =

Architecture school of Laurentian University

- Former name: Laurentian School of Architecture
- Type: Architecture school
- Established: September 2013
- Parent institution: Laurentian University
- Location: Greater Sudbury, Ontario, Canada; 46.49263°N 80.99705°W
- Website: mcewenarchitecture.ca

The McEwen School of Architecture (French: l'École d'architecture McEwen), formerly the Laurentian School of Architecture, is an architecture school belonging to Laurentian University in Sudbury, Ontario, Canada. The school opened in September 2013, and was the first new school of architecture to open in Canada in 45 years. It is also the first school of its kind in Northern Ontario, and the first in Canada outside Quebec to offer courses in French.

The school adopted its current name in 2016 following a $10 million donation from former Goldcorp CEO Rob McEwen.

== Background ==
The school is part of Laurentian University, and was granted authorization by the provincial Ministry of Training, Colleges and Universities in 2011, with the province committing $21 million toward its creation. The architecture project, which began as a community initiative in mid-2007, gained initial community support from the City of Greater Sudbury ($10 million) and the Northern Ontario Heritage Fund ($5 million). Federal support from FedNor was also requested ($5 million).

The school announced the selection of its founding director, Dr. Terrance Galvin, MRAIC, in January 2012. Galvin was previously the director of the architecture school at Dalhousie University in Halifax, Nova Scotia. In September and October 2012 interviews were to take place to fill the school's 24 faculty positions.

The school accepted its first students in September 2013. It was the first new school of architecture to open in Canada in over 40 years. It is the first Canadian school of architecture to offer a design studio curriculum in both English and French, as well as a cultural learning environment for the First Nations, Métis, and Inuit communities.

In 2021, the school got accredited by Canadian Architectural Certification Board.

== Campus location ==
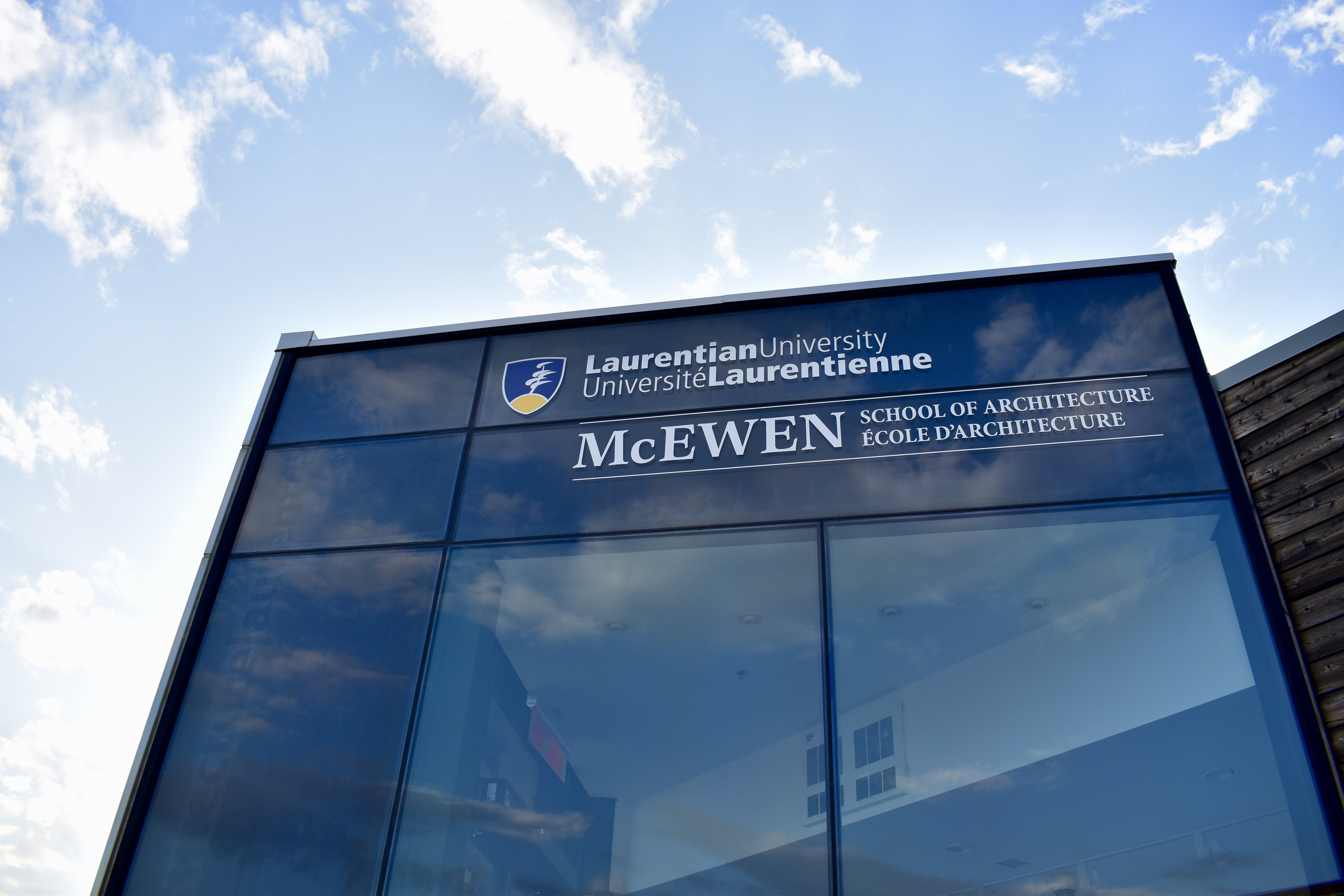
McEwen School of Architecture

The school faced some initial controversy when it announced its preferred campus location in Downtown Sudbury, which would displace the city's existing farmer's market. Both the city and the school have proposed alternate locations such as the local watering hole Peddlers Pub to resolve the relocation as the school will occupy the former Market Square, including the CP Telegraph Building (1914) for faculty offices and the CP Rail Shed (circa 1905) as its design studio and classroom for the first two years. The city voted on November 9, 2011, to accept the school's request to purchase the site, and struck an advisory panel to make recommendations on the relocation and development of the farmer's market. The panel ultimately decided to relocate the farmer's market to the Sudbury railway station. In a new chapter in Sudbury's history marking downtown revitalization, the School of Architecture site incorporated, rather than demolishing, the former market building as well as the neighbouring CP Telegraph Building, which has a heritage designation and which housed offices and a restaurant.

In a presentation to Greater Sudbury City Council in April 2012, Galvin announced that the site plan design by LGA Architectural Partners would involve four distinct buildings — the two existing buildings and two new structures, arranged around a central courtyard, with above-ground walkways connecting the buildings to allow pedestrian and bicycle traffic through the site. The landscape plan and the building performance matrix are aimed at referencing the boreal forest while addressing ecology and the impact of climate change in architecture.

The $27 million project included adaptive reuse of the existing buildings and a new building. An entire wing of the new building is constructed in cross-laminated timber (CLT), the first building of its kind in Ontario.

The campus also houses the studios of CKLU-FM, Laurentian University's campus radio station.

== Curriculum ==
The curriculum emphasizes architectural and manufacturing techniques with a focus on traditional and evolving aspects of northern life, including indigenous culture, wooden construction, ecology and local resources as well as adaptive design to the impacts of climate change.
