= Peter Cardew =

British-Canadian architect (1939–2020)

- Born: 6 August 1939; Guildford, England
- Died: 26 October 2020 (aged 81)
- Education: Kingston College of Art
- Occupation: Architect
- Practice: Peter Cardew Architects
- Projects: C.N. Pavilion, Expo 86, Vancouver; Morris and Helen Belkin Art Gallery, Vancouver
- Website: https://www.petercardew.com/

Peter Cardew (6 August 1939 – 26 October 2020) was a British-Canadian architect. He was the principal of Peter Cardew Architects based in Vancouver, British Columbia, Canada. His portfolio included projects ranging across different scales, including single family housing, schools, art galleries, office buildings, and exhibition buildings.

Cardew won numerous awards for his work, including the Royal Architectural Institute of Canada (RAIC) Gold Medal in 2012. Many critics regard him as an "architect's architect" for his innovative exploration of structure, materiality, and spatial experiences. His work has been featured in various exhibitions and publications. Cardew died in 2020.

== Early life and education ==
Born in 1939 at Guildford, Cardew grew up in the suburbs of Surrey, England. Some of his earliest childhood memories were filled with terrors of World War II. He moved into a safer refuge in Lancashire during wartime. These early memories caused Cardew to be inclined to use bare concrete in his architecture, as it resonated with childhood feelings of safety.

Cardew attended Kingston College of Art in the Royal Borough of Kingston Upon Thames in England in 1958. Prior to his completion of a Diploma in Architecture in 1965, he took a year off to work on an exhibition pavilion with Max Bächer Architect in Stuttgart, West Germany, from 1961 to 1962. Following work for a number of small firms after his graduation, Cardew worked as a project architect with Roman Halter & Associates in London, England until the year of 1966. In the same year, despite an offer of partnership at a young age, he decided to emigrate to Vancouver, Canada.

== Career ==
=== 1967–1980: Tenures with Rhone & Iredale Architects ===
Cardew gravitated to Rhone & Iredale Architects after he arrived in Vancouver in 1967. Rhone & Iredale Architects was considered as an innovative architectural firm at that time, and it has incubated the careers of many notable architects, including Richard Henriquez, Peter Busby, Rainer Fassler, and Miller & Hull. During Cardew's tenures with Rhone & Iredale — where he became a partner in 1974 — he contributed to several fine designs, including the Crown Life Building and False Creek Row Houses.

==== Crown Life Plaza, Vancouver, 1978 ====
Cardew was the project architect of Crown Life Plaza when he served as a partner for Rhone & Iredale. The project was commissioned by the Regina-based Crown Life Insurance Company. Located on 1500 West Georgia Street, the building serves as a gateway to Vancouver's central downtown area. The triangular 20-storey office building is shaped by its unique site where Vancouver's urban grid meets the harbor-facing street. Characterized by glass cladding and a concrete core, the building rests on a brick plinth, showing the rich materiality of the properties. The plaza features a reflecting pool, a cascading waterfall and one-storey retail pavilion that imitates the triangular footprint of the office tower.

=== 1980–2020: Peter Cardew Architects ===
As Rhone & Iredale was closing in 1980, Cardew established his private eponymous practice in Vancouver. He consistently kept his practice small, low-profile, and limited in size and number of projects, so as to remain significantly involved and assure the quality of work. Some notable former employees include Russell Acton, Michael Kothke, Rob Grant, David Scott, Marc MacCaull, and Elizabeth Shotton; many of Cardew's employees have moved on and established their own successful careers.

==== C.N. Pavilion, Expo 86, Vancouver, 1986 ====
During a transformative decade in which Vancouver hosted Expo 86, Cardew designed the C.N. (Canadian National) Pavilion to showcase the Canadian National Railways. Cardew aspired to create a socially interactive architecture, in part through providing generous public spaces. Situated along Vancouver's downtown waterfront, the design of the pavilion addressed its intention, context, circulation, and functions well. It was conceived as a fully exposed steel framework wrapping around a cylinder theatre, which could only be entered by a bridge. Because of the poor condition of the site, Cardew designed the main structure as a grand steel canopy suspended by a gantry system with three foundation locations. This structural design not only embraced the surrounding beautiful harbour views, but also provided better accessibility for visitors. This pavilion took cues from 19th century railway terminals and was a counterpoint to the traditional design of exposition pavilions at the time.

This exhibition pavilion received the Canadian Architect Award of Excellence in 1985.

==== Stone Band School, Stone Indian Reserve NO. 1, British Columbia, 1992 ====
Completed to serve the community of the Chilcotin region in central British Columbia, Stone Band School houses a library, offices, classrooms for kindergarten and grade levels, and a yet unbuilt gymnasium for a second phase. The surrounding topography, kikwilli vernacular cultures, and community lifestyle became the driving forces behind the design. The building appears quite horizontal, responding to the contextual land form. Clusters of classrooms and offices are placed around a central gathering core, illuminated by a glazed conical skylight which is assembled of peeled fir poles.

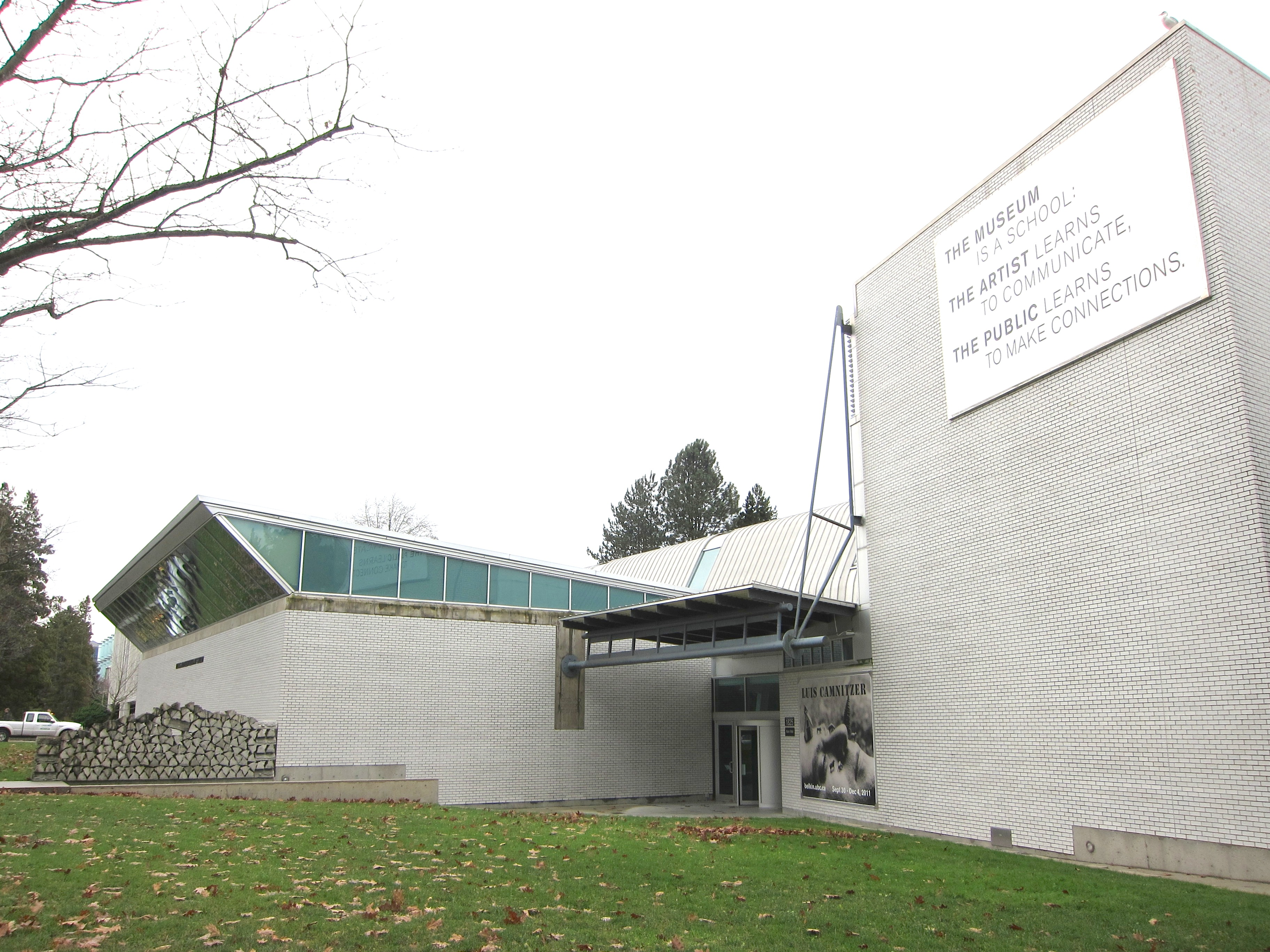
Morris and Helen Belkin Art Gallery, Vancouver, 1995 by Peter Cardew Architects

==== Morris and Helen Belkin Art Gallery, Vancouver, 1995 ====
The Morris and Helen Belkin Art Gallery is configured by the plaza it shares with other arts faculties on the University of British Columbia's campus. The exterior of the art gallery is manipulated carefully to reflect programs, circulation and site conditions. The main entrance faces a tree-lined boulevard, and the other entrance within the shared plaza accommodates a loading dock with a suspended canopy. The open interior arrangement allows administrative offices on the mezzanine floor to overlook gallery space. Cardew also used two pivoting walls to enhance flexibility.

The Belkin Gallery has won multiple awards, including a Royal Architectural Institute of Canada Governor General’s Medal for Architecture in 1999.

=== Academics, publications and exhibitions ===
Cardew was active in academia and in architectural education. He was an adjunct professor at the University of British Columbia, the University of Calgary, Washington State University, the University of Texas at Austin. He also widely lectured across continents, including North America, Latin America, Asia, and Europe. Cardew was Chairman of the City of Vancouver Urban Design Panel in 1978.

==== Peter Cardew: Ordinary Buildings ====
In 1996, the Charles H. Scott Gallery at Emily Carr College of Art and Design in Vancouver held the exhibition Peter Cardew: Ordinary Buildings, which later toured across North America.

== Later life ==
Cardew was a longstanding supporter of the University of British Columbia's School of Architecture and Landscape Architecture and helped review student designs and projects and mentor students. In later life he was a member of the school's advisory council. He died on 26 October 2020.

== Awards ==
- Canadian Architect Awards, Award of Excellence (1977, 1980, 1985, 1988, 1991, 1992, 1996, 1999, 2002, 2006)
- Royal Architectural Institute of Canada Festival of Architecture Award of Merit (1980)
- Architectural Institute of British Columbia Design Award (1982)
- Royal Architectural Institute of Canada Governor General’s Medal for Architecture (1982, 1999)
- Architectural Institute of British Columbia Lieutenant Governor’s Medal for Architecture (1999, 2005)
- Royal Architectural Institute of Canada Gold Medal (2012)

== Bibliography ==
- Peter Cardew: Ordinary Buildings, Charles H. Scott Gallery, ISBN 0921356099
