= Ian MacDonald (architect) =

Canadian architect (born 1953)

- Born: 1953 (age 72–73); Kitchener, Ontario

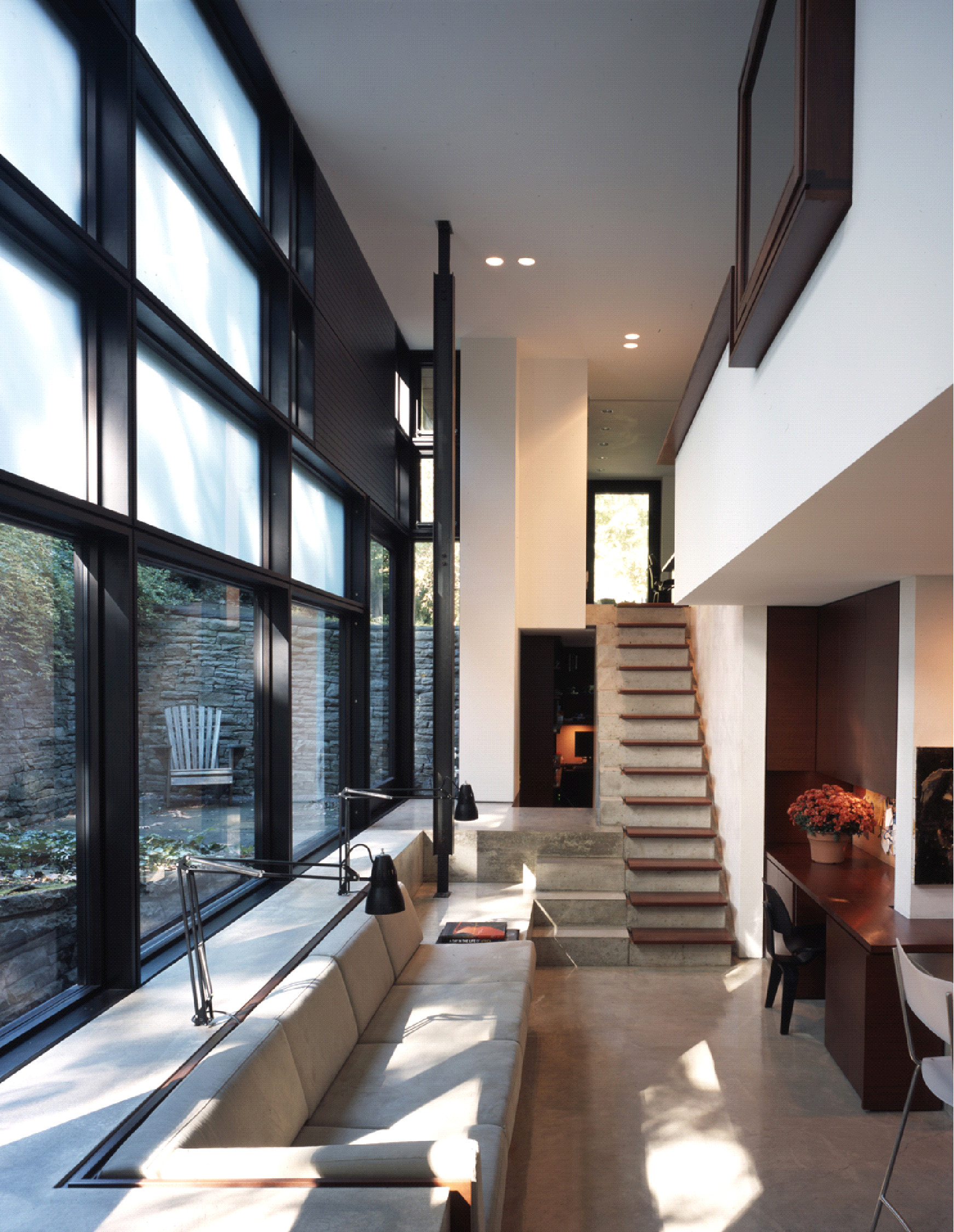
House at 4a Wychwood Park, Ian MacDonald Architect Inc.

Ian MacDonald is a Canadian architect. He studied architecture at the University of Waterloo and graduated in 1978 from Carleton University. He worked for Ronald Thom at the Thom Partnership', where he developed a foundation for his own approach to site, structure and the importance of landscape in architecture. In 1984 he established the firm of Ian MacDonald Architect, best known for its residential projects.

In addition to practicing architecture, MacDonald has taught at the University of Toronto, John H. Daniels Faculty of Architecture, Landscape and Design between 1984 and 2000, and has lectured nationally and internationally.

Awards by his company, Ian MacDonald Architect Inc, include:

- 2008: Governor General Medal for Architecture, 4a Wychwood Park
- 2005: Canadian Architect – Award of Excellence, House in Grey Highlands
- 2004: Governor General Medal for Architecture, House in Erin Township
- 2002: Governor General Medal for Architecture, House in Mulmur Hills #1

== Selected projects ==
- The Boulevard Club

== Sources ==
- "Architecture Canada 2002: The Governor General's Medals in Architecture", Tuns Press, 2002
- "Architecture Canada 2008: The Governor General's Medals in Architecture", RAIC, 2008
