= Chevalier Morales Architectes =

Canadian architecture firm

Practice information
- Partners: Stephan Chevalier and Sergio Morales
- Founded: 2005

Significant works and honors
- Buildings: Maison de la littérature

Website
- https://chevaliermorales.com/en/

Chevalier Morales Architectes is a Canadian architecture firm operating from Montreal, Quebec. Stephan Chevalier and Sergio Morales, the co-owners and creators of the firm, have been designing together under the name Chevalier Morales since 2005 and during this time period they have been awarded multiple architectural competition contracts within the public sector. As a firm of 45 practicing designers, Chevalier Morales focuses mainly on public experiences as well as private dwellings. In addition to their awarded architectural competition projects, the firm has also been presented with awards in regards to their completed designs.

== Projects ==
=== Maison de la Littérature ===
The Maison de la Littérature is a design created by Chevalier Morales that is decorated with Canadian-recognized awards for its performance as a communal space in Quebec City, Quebec. The building, which features a retrofitted historic library Wesley Temple and newly built annex space, are both used as public spaces. The design itself features the combination of the original library's neo-gothic architectural style and the modern contemporary annex design. The Maison de la Littérature is a centre for community engagement, incorporating a lecture hall, café and exhibition space.

=== Drummondville Public Library ===
The Drummondville Public Library is another Chevalier Morales design that is dedicated to a community-based program. Their design features a façade of curtain wall construction that curves to fit the site of the previous Drummondville Public Library in Drummondville, Quebec. The interior of the Drummondville public library features an all-white colour palette to emphasize the depth of the structural elements. This technique also allows for the eye to meet the curvilinear features of the interior staircase with ease, as it is the focal point of the interior pathways. The building also features communal gathering areas to accommodate large-scale community events.

=== Pierrefonds Public Library ===
The Pierrefonds Public Library by Chevalier Morales is a retrofit of and an addition to the previous Pierrefonds Public Library in Pierrefonds, Quebec. The contract was won by the architectural firm over 3 other design submissions, which was designed in collaboration with DMA Architectes. The design itself, which fits the firm's modern architectural style with its white interiors and curtain wall façade, is LEED certified. Created as a communal centre in addition to recreating the existing public library, the new building features an interior courtyard, cafe, animation room and multimedia spaces to accommodate all ages.

=== Residence de l'Isle ===
The Residence de l'Isle is located on the outside of Laval, Quebec along the Rivière des Mille Îles and was designed by Chevalier Morales for a family which was completed in 2019. This project works with the landscape and vegetation of the area to protect the natural landscape and highlighting it with the building. Many of the previously existing trees were maintained during construction and highlighted with the frame of the building. Chevalier Morales utilized an integration of older architectural materials and practices and newer practices and materials. Many of the materials chosen were natural to aid with integration of the building into the natural ecosystem. The placement of beams and windows throughout the residence allows for natural daylight into the spaces including the backyard and swimming pool. The living spaces within the residence are oriented along the river axis to coincide with daily activities and the changing of the landscape. Geothermal wells are utilized in the design to provide sustainable heating throughout the structure.

=== Thibault Residence ===
The Thibault Residence is located in Mont-Tremblant, Quebec. Designed by Chevalier Morales with local materials and tradespeople in 2008. The design utilizes mass timber and local rocks and minerals. The firm utilized the slope of the landscape and exposed rocks to determine the façade and accentuate the local materials in the area and on site. Within the timber framing there is a curtain glass wall that allows views of the surrounding landscape and vegetation.

=== Residence Roy-Lawrence ===
The Residence Roy-Lawrence is a mountainside chalet located in Sutton, Quebec. The building itself consists of a wood and steel façade in the firm's identifiable contemporary block designs. The building overlooks the mountain views of rural Quebec while using its low profile to the advantage of declining into the mountainside. With strategic skylights to maximize scenic views and interior daylighting as well as specifically placed exterior windows, the chalet is immersed in its surroundings.

== Awards ==
- 2021- Canadian Architect Award for École Val-Martin
- 2020- Governor General's Medal in Architecture for Drummondville Library
- 2019- Quebec Libraries and Archives Architecture Award for Pierrefonds Public Library
- 2019- Grand Prix d'excellence de l'OAQ for Drummondville Library
- 2018- Governor General's Medal in Architecture for Maison de la Littérature
- 2018- Emerging Architectural Practice Award by the Royal Architectural Institute of Canada
- 2018- Emerging Architectural Practice Award
- 2017- Grand Prix d'excellence and the Prix d'excellence en architecture of the Quebec Order of Architects for Maison de la Littérature

== Competitions ==
- 2020- Finalist for Peter-McGill Center Competition
- 2019- Finalist in Lab-École Saguenay Competition
- 2018- Winner of the Agora des Arts in Rouyn-Noranda Competition
- 2014- Winner for Maison de la Littérature
- 2014- Winner for Drummondville Public Library
- 2013- Winner for Pierrefonds Public Library
