= LGA Architectural Partners =

Canadian architectural firm

- Type: Architectural firm
- Industry: Architecture, Interiors, Building Science
- Predecessor: Formerly known as Levitt Goodman Architects
- Founded: 1989
- Headquarters: Toronto, Canada
- Key people: Janna Levitt, Dean Goodman
- Number of employees: 40
- Website: https://lga-ap.com/

LGA Architectural Partners (LGA) is an architectural firm founded in 1989 and based in Toronto, Ontario, Canada. The firm designs residential, institutional, and community projects with a focus on sustainability and social housing.

LGA's portfolio includes housing projects and community centres, with several projects designed for vulnerable populations including women and youths. The firm is known for its work in affordable housing and socially-oriented architecture.

== Projects ==
=== Euclid Avenue House ===
Designed in 2005, the Euclid Avenue House in Toronto was commissioned by Janna Levitt and Dean Goodman as a "living laboratory" intended to explore alternative methodologies to the prevailing trends in Toronto custom homes at the time. The narrow infill site meant the house was designed with flexible living spaces and an unusual plan, with the aim of encouraging its inhabitants to engage more with the surrounding city. The house included several sustainable features, including passive ventilation and Toronto's first purpose-built residential green roof. The outdoor spaces accommodate various forms of urban agriculture, and the house's lower level was purpose-designed to transition over time from a children's suite to a rental unit.

=== Eva's Phoenix Brant Street ===
Eva's Phoenix is a transitional housing and employment training facility in dedication to Eva Smith, an advocate for homeless youth. LGA designed the original Eva's Phoenix in 2000. When plans of converting the building into condominiums emerged, LGA was tasked with designing a new space within a portion of the 1932 Art Deco warehouse building. LGA designed the project to allow newcomers to transition from observing the shelter community's social activity to taking part in it, and giving the residents privacy while also addressing safety and security considerations. The plan consists of 10 internal 'houses' along a 'main street' within a 3-storey atrium lit by natural daylight from a new roof composed of skylights. Each "townhouse" consists of a communal kitchen and small living area on the ground floor, and five personal bedrooms above. In addition to the residential spaces, a third level above one side of the townhouses offers open meeting spaces for staff and passive rooftop surveillance. Ancillary spaces for employment skills, such as classrooms, workshops, demonstration kitchens, and counseling offices, were positioned among the three floors.

=== Toronto Public Library - Scarborough Civic Centre ===
The Scarborough Civic Centre branch was designed by LGA with Philip H. Carter as the planning consultant. It is the Toronto Public Library's 100th branch. Opened in 2015, the facility features a low-slung volume and a series of tilted, large-scale glulam columns and beams. The interior incorporates layered wood and a central atrium that allows natural light to reach the library's stacks and reading rooms. Additional features include floor-to-ceiling windows, an outdoor reading garden, and a green roof which connects the branch to the surrounding neighbourhood and adjacent parkland. The use of wood was selected to contrast with the concrete structure of the nearby Scarborough Civic Centre.

=== McEwen School of Architecture - Laurentian University ===
The McEwen School of Architecture at Laurentian University is located in downtown Sudbury. Two existing structures on the site were re-purposed to engender a campus-like atmosphere and support efficient phasing of the project. The site was home to a former Canadian Pacific Railway ticket and telegraph building and a rail shed. The second of two new additions is made of cross-laminated timber (CLT), chosen for its sustainability attributes and connection to the region's forestry industry and Indigenous heritage. Made of 550 cubic meters of wood, at the time of construction, it was the first major CLT building in Ontario. Doubling as a teaching opportunity, a conscious choice of exposing structural, mechanical, and electrical systems was made to reference the instructional role of the school. The school was completed in 2016 and opened in January 2017.

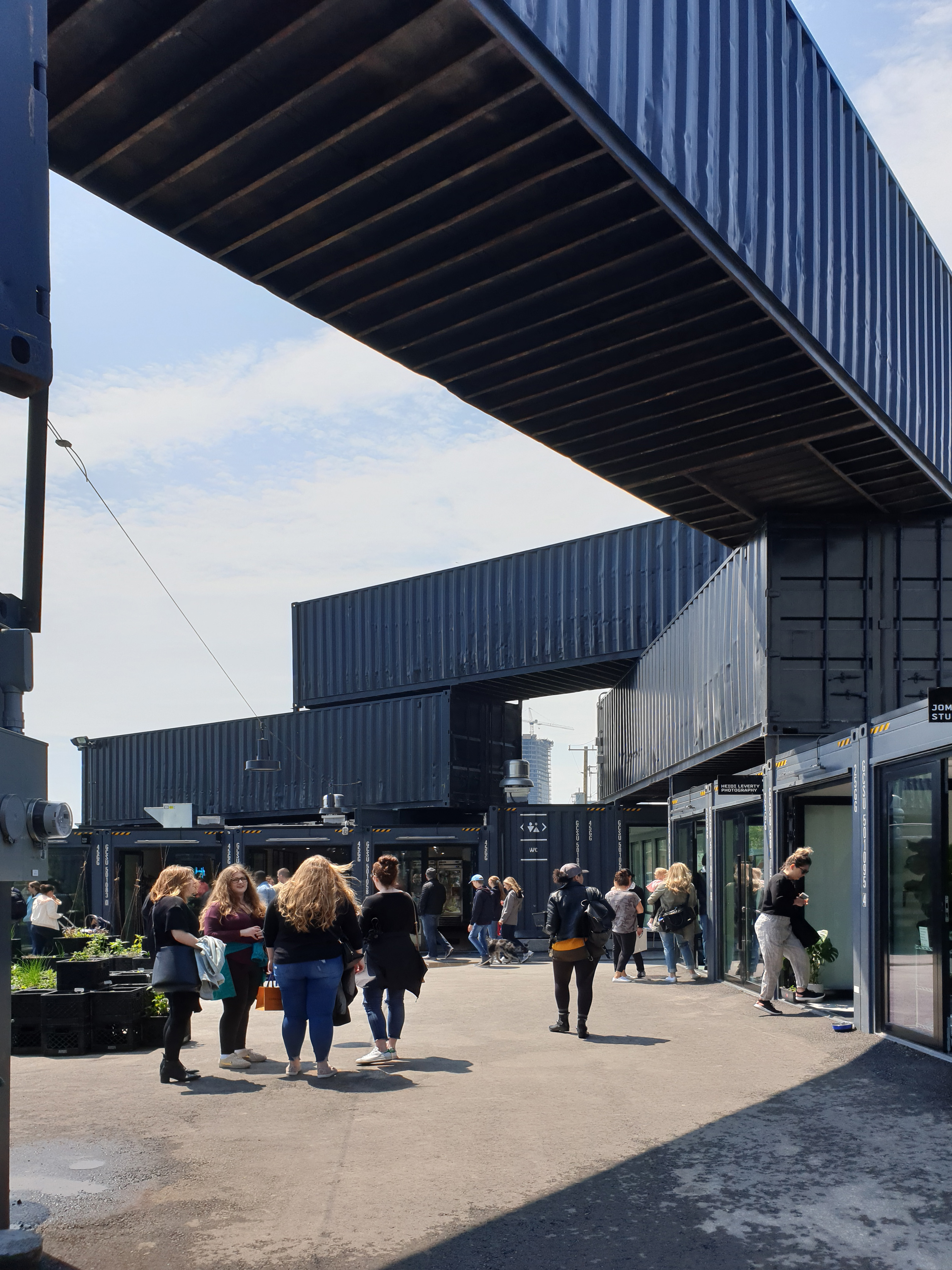
Containers form a courtyard displaying public art.

=== Stackt Shipping Container Market ===
Stackt Market temporarily occupies the site of a former smelting plant at the intersection of Front and Bathurst in Toronto. The all-season public market is constructed from about 120 shipping containers. Inspired by shipping container-housed markets in the United Kingdom, for example, Boxpark, the market occupies a 2.5 acre patch of formerly vacant land owned by the City of Toronto.

Toronto entrepreneur Matt Rubinoff founded Stackt Market in 2014. Following research of retrofitted shipping container precedents in the city, he contacted LGA to design and masterplan the site. After five years of development, Stackt Market opened to the public on 10 April 2019.

The site is organized around a central pedestrian corridor extending from the main entrance, with a network of courtyards, side streets, and laneways branching off from it. Containers at ground level house pop-up businesses, creative incubators, and retail spaces.

Individual retail units were designed using a modular kit-of-parts system to allow for relocation and reuse. Larger tenant spaces are formed by combining multiple container modules. Food and beverage vendors are clustered around a south-facing courtyard and lawn, which provide direct sunlight and views toward an adjacent rail corridor. Additional reclaimed containers were stacked to create second- and third-storey spaces, contributing to varied building heights and providing surfaces for large-scale murals and street art.

== Awards ==
LGA has received several awards for design excellence, including a Governor General's Medal in Architecture and a RAIC Award of Excellence for Innovation. In 2019, the firm received the Architectural Firm Award from the RAIC. Their projects have been recognised by the OAA awards, Toronto Urban Design Awards, Ontario WoodWorks!, and the Canadian Wood Council, among others.
