= Joseph S. Stauffer Library =

Academic library in Kingston, Ontario, Canada

Coordinates: 44.22854°N 76.49613°W

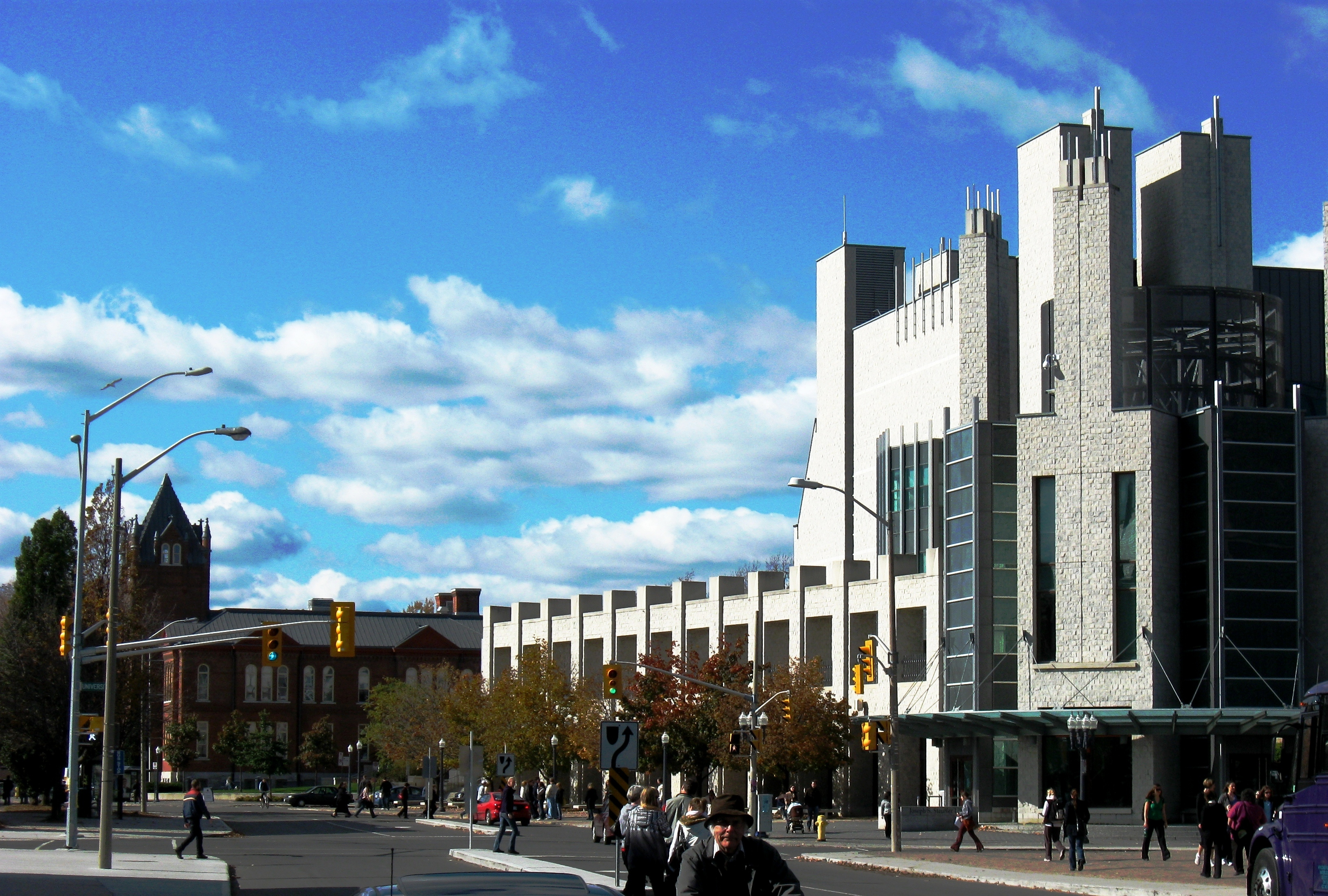
- The library in 2008
- Type: Academic library
- Established: 1994; 32 years ago
- Branch of: Queen's University Library
- Criteria for collection: Research publications

Other information
- Website: Stauffer Library

Joseph S. Stauffer Library, or simply Stauffer, is the main social science and humanities library of Queen's University in Kingston, Ontario, Canada. Construction was completed in 1994 at a cost of C$42 million, funded partially by the Ontario government and the Joseph S. Stauffer Foundation.

The library is the largest building on the university campus, with Postmodern architecture referencing the Neo-Gothic style by architecture firm Kuwabara Payne McKenna Blumberg Architects (KPMB). It won the 1997 Governor General's Award for Architecture.

The library features include:

- Adaptive Technology Centre
- Art Collection
- MADGIC-Maps, Data and Government Information Centre
- Map and Air Photo Collection
- Social Science Data Centre
- Wallach-Groome Sustainability Centre

One portion of Stauffer Library's interior helical staircase

== Partnerships and collaboration ==
The Queens University Library is a member of the Association of Research Libraries, Canadian Association of Research Libraries, and the Ontario Council of University Libraries. The Queens University Library is a contributor to the Open Content Alliance
