= Peter Busby =

British architect (born 1952)

- Born: September 26, 1952 (age 73)
- Education: University of Toronto University of British Columbia
- Occupation: Architect
- Awards: Honorary Doctorate in Science from Ryerson University 2008 RAIC Gold Medal 2014
- Practice: Director of Perkins + Will San Francisco
- Design: Sustainability

Peter Busby (born 1952) is an architect and managing director at Perkins & Will Architects, with a background in philosophy and a history of advancing sustainable design. Throughout his career, he has advocated for sustainable building strategies and integrated green building infrastructure that serves to educate the users of his spaces.

== Life and education ==
Busby was born in Southport, Merseyside, UK on September 26, 1952. His father was a British engineer who emigrated to Canada and worked at Nortel in Toronto and New York. Busby's wife Catherine is an occupational therapist and they have four children. Busby holds a Bachelors of Arts in Political Philosophy from the University of Toronto where he graduated in 1974 to pursue a Bachelor of Architecture from the University of British Columbia in 1977. He received an Honorary Doctorate in Science from Ryerson University in 2008. Throughout his years studying philosophy, Busby worked summer jobs on construction sites, which included carpentry. Some notable professors included architectural historian Douglas Richardson of the University of Toronto, and UBC sustainability professor Raymond Cole.

== Career ==
Upon graduating, Busby apprenticed with Rhone & Iredale Architects in Vancouver, then with Norman Foster in London and Hong Kong, where he was a project architect at the age of 28. He also worked with Miller Hull. He started his own practice in Vancouver in 1984. As the sole practitioner at the time, he constructed 1216 Granville Street office, then located in a marginal neighborhood. Paul Bridger would join as partner in 1986, and the practice grew to 10 in 1992 and 45 by 2004. In 1987 Busby founded the product design firm Designlines and integrated industrial design into his architecture. His attitude towards design is defined by an industrious vision driven by a confidence that critic Adele Weder describes as necessary for making an impact in an industry of "sclerotic conventions." Weder points to the example of One Wall Centre Project, a 48-story tower which ignited conflicts between his client and the city of Vancouver, resulting in a dual-toned glass envelope.

He leads his practice making architecture notably present in all contexts responding to the existing urban fabric. One of Busby's first jobs was a lab for MacMillan Bloedel, the forestry company that created parallel strand lumber (Parallam), the same material he would use for that project and further served as an inspiration for Busby to incorporate into his future projects. The practice led to the formation of Busby Bridger Architects in 1986 grew to Busby + Associates which eventually collaborated with Perkins + Will in 2002 and merged for a strategic partnership in 2004. His team consists of researchers, biologists, and staff working towards issues he believes architecture should address. Their projects have received numerous design awards including six Governor General Awards, eleven British Columbia Lieutenant Governor Awards, and the Royal Architectural Institute of Canada's Firm of the Year Award. Busby often lectures on sustainability topics and green initiatives both nationally and internationally and is a founder of Leadership in Energy and Environmental Design (LEED) along with being a founding member of the Canada Green Building Council.

== Design philosophy ==
Busby's design philosophy of synergy between architecture and nature is reinforced by the values he gained from his philosophy background. He seeks to create buildings that give back energy rather than consuming it, at peace with nature and contributing to social responsibility. This manifesto is exemplified in the Center of Interactive Research on Sustainability (CIRS) and Van Dusen Botanical Garden Visitor Center along with the multitude of projects using reclaimed building material and minimizing resource consumption. He makes the business case for sustainable design through reducing the cost and marketing with captivating graphics while requiring architects to collaborate with other disciplines.

Busby also employs this logic in his personal life, as demonstrated by his off-grid Vancouver cabin powered by photovoltaic cells, eight vertical-axis wind turbines and a rainwater collection system to water the gardens. The row of vertical windows references his urban designs and maximizes the efficient use of light. This handcrafted summer home displays his love of wood, since the material embodies carbon along with providing the natural warmth and humanity evoked through the atmospheric qualities beyond its benefits as a building material. Busby believes sustainability efforts should begin with educating the general public; others in the architecture, engineering and construction (AEC) industry; and clients. He combines his sustainable design experience with his business acumen to advocate for greener cities, working with developers such as Concorde and large retail chains such as Walmart.

When designing industrial architecture, he considers not only the building and environmental factors but also the intrapersonal impact, which he believes includes higher productivity and product quality along with lower staff turnover rates. An example is Busby's contributions to the EBCO Aerospace office in Delta, BC, which maximizes efficiency through its proximity to transportation hubs, rail, waterways, a labour pool, and lower-priced land. He believes employees should be supported by a full range of complementary community services such as banks, cleaners, restaurants, daycare, and recreation.

Currently at Perkins and Will, he has focused on the regenerative design approach where each operation in a building's construction is measured by its positive impact on human and natural systems.

== Sustainability ==
Busby's architectural career is primarily focused on sustainability to integrate building systems to foster user experience and improve the environment which it resides. His approach to architecture considers affordability, amenities, transportation, and social issues to be worked into given project briefs, backed by scientific and economic considerations that provide a business case for sustainability. On the CIRS project, majority of the heavy timber used are pine beetle reclaimed lumber that would have otherwise been disposed of. Busby studies the embodied energy of the material and its carbon footprint to processing prior to its installation, digging deep into the numbers that contribute to published statistics, a case example educating that a reduction in carbon emissions can be a result of offshoring operations, economic recession, or a reduction in price of an alternative energy source. Busby's takes a strategic approach to delivering his sustainable strategies, working with developers and large retail chains—notably Walmart, which adopted 20 of the 34 design suggestions he made for their Vancouver store to their other stores.

Busby's architectural practices include the use of reclaimed and recycled building materials that are locally sourced, reducing embodied carbon, and the majority of his projects are designed with passive sustainability moves prior to implementing active building systems such as integrated PV and geothermal heating and cooling. Through practicing and actively researching and educating along with public advocacy, Busby encourages walking, mixed use developments around transit nodes, and to reduce carbon footprint. This longstanding engagement with the complex factors contributing to sustainability as well as advocacy for the profession's role and potential in furthering sustainability goals is recounted in Busby: Learning Sustainable Design (2007).

== Notable project contributions ==
Center for Interactive Research on Sustainability (CIRS) Vancouver, British Columbia

Van Dusen Botanical Garden Visitor Centre Vancouver, British Columbia

Brentwood Station Burnaby, British Columbia

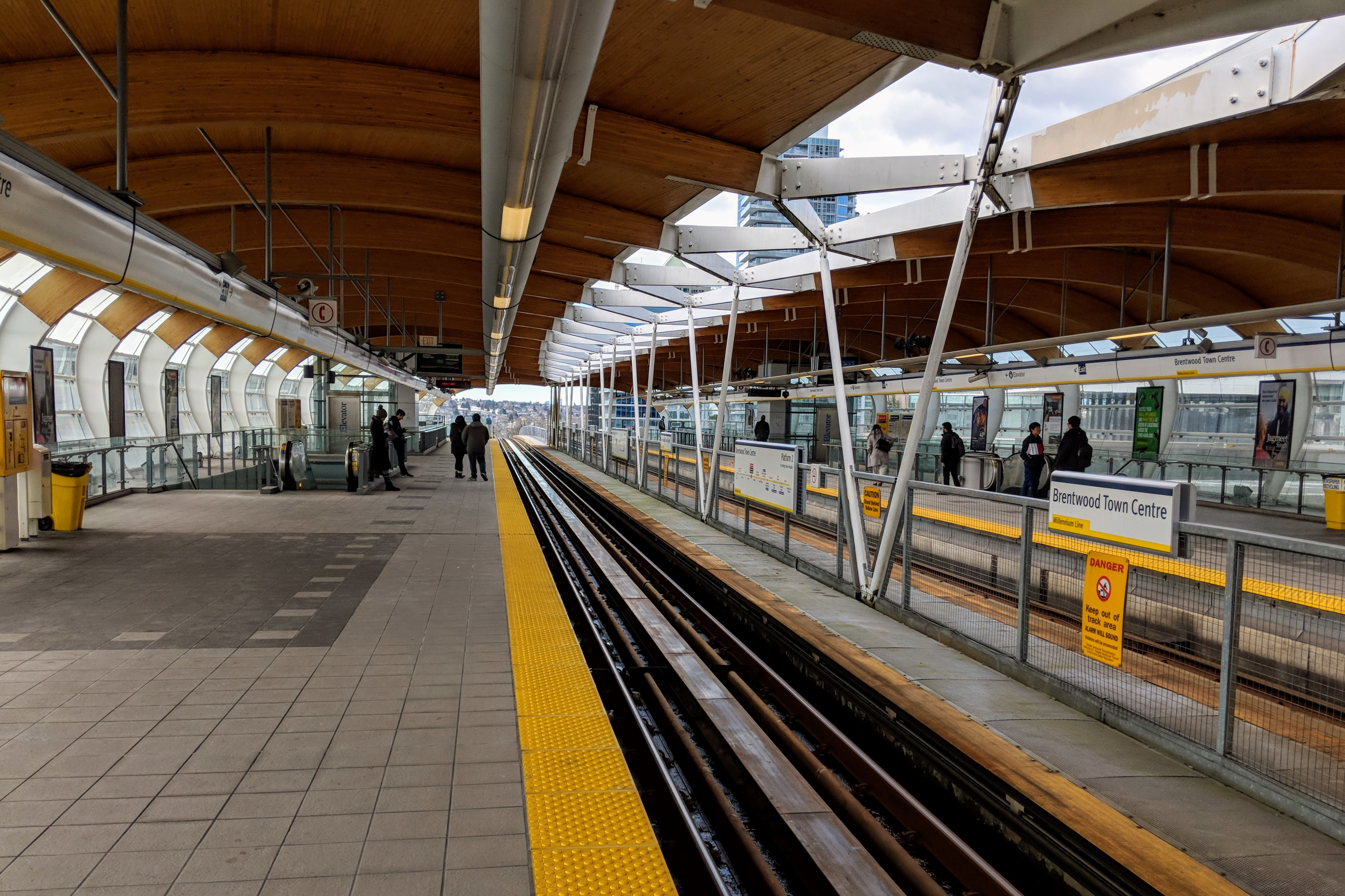
Brentwood Station. One of the Stations along the Millennium skytrain line in Vancouver notable for its use of wood.

Canada Line Stations Richmond, British Columbia

Riyadh Metro Prototype Stations Riyadh, Saudi Arabia

707 Terry Seattle, Washington

Canada's Earth Tower Vancouver, British Columbia

Perkins & Will Atlanta Studio Atlanta, Georgia

Lucile Packard Children's Hospital Stanford Palo Alto, California

Potrero Power Station San Francisco, California

Ottawa Confederation Line Ottawa, Ontario

Marine Gateway Vancouver, British Columbia

Brighthouse Elementary School Richmond, British Columbia.

== Recognition ==
- Canadian Green Building Council
- LEED Fellow
- Fellow, Cascadia Green Building Council
- Member, Order of Canada
- Fellow, Royal Architectural Institute of Canada
- Founder, board member, and chair, Canada Green Building Council

== Publications ==
- "Eight ways to inspire innovation in the business of architecture" Greenbiz. 13 February 2016 <www.greenbiz.com>
- Busby: Architecture's New Edges, Ecotone, 2015.
- Busby: Learning Sustainable Design, Janam Publications, 2007.
- "Perkins+Will Portfolio: A look at recent projects from the Vancouver, British Columbia, Canada, office of Perkins+Will, led by Peter Busby." Architect. 5 March 2012. <www.architectmag.com>
- "Is This the World's Greenest Neighborhood?" The Atlantic. 25 August 2011 <www.theatiantic.com>

== Awards ==
- Royal Architectural Institute of Canada (RAIC) Gold Medalist, 2014
- Acterra Award for Sustainability, Business Environmental Awards, 2013
- Wood WORKS! Awards, VanDusen Botanical Garden Visitor Center, 2013
- Lieutenant Governor of British Columbia Medal in Architecture 2012
- Samuel Brighouse Elementary School, Lieutenant Governor of British Columbia, Medal in Architecture, 2012
- Architectural Record's Schools of the 21st Century, Center for Interactive Research on Sustainability (CIRS), 2012
- AIBC Innovation Award, 2012
- Top 5 Project, Clean50, 2013
- Canada's Greenest Employers, 2010, 2011, 2012
- Firm Award – The Globe and Mail Laurentian University Living With Lakes Ecology Center
- Regional Holcim Award Winner, Dockside Green, 2009
- AIA COTE Top Ten Green Projects, 2009.
- Globe Awards for Environmental Excellence, 2008.
- Officer of the Order of Canada in 2005
- Honorary Doctorate from Ryerson University 2008
