= Patkau Architects =

Architecture firm based in Vancouver, British Columbia, Canada

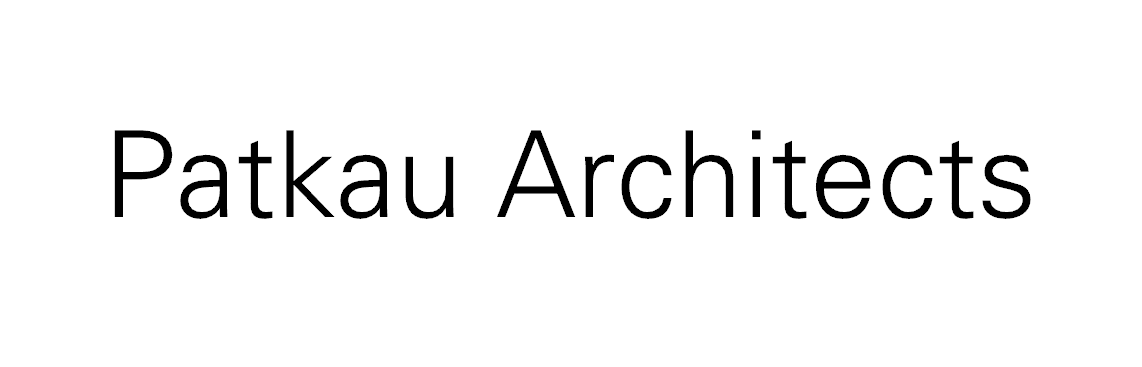

Practice information
- Key architects: John Patkau; Patricia Patkau; Greg Boothroyd; David Shone
- Founded: 1978
- Location: Vancouver B.C. Canada

Significant works and honors
- Projects: University of Toronto Academic Wood Tower; Arbour House; Capilano Library; Temple of Light; Audain Art Museum; Hadaway House
- Awards: 2026 AIA Architecture Award; 2026 Governor General's Medal in Architecture; 2023 RAIC Architectural Practice Award; 2019 Canadian Wood Council Design Innovation Award; 2019 Canadian Architect Award of Excellence; 2019 Lieutenant Governor of British Columbia Medal in Architecture; 2019 AIBC Innovation Award; Canadian Architect Award of Merit

Patkau Architects is an architecture firm based in Vancouver, British Columbia, Canada. It is a full-service firm practicing in Canada and the United States. Its project scope includes, but is not limited to, gallery installations, art galleries, libraries, university buildings, urban planning and private residences. The firm has received numerous national and international architectural awards. Patkau Architects also represented Canada at the Venice Biennale in 2006.

The work of Patkau Architects has been widely disseminated, with three volumes devoted to the firm's output, several essays in scholarly publications, and inclusion in international exhibitions. They have also published their own book entitled Patkau Architects: Material Operations' in 2017 that discusses the firm's beliefs and techniques through materials and unconventional practices.

== History ==
=== John and Patricia Patkau ===
John and Patricia Patkau were both born in Winnipeg, Manitoba in Canada, John on August 18, 1947 and Patricia on February 25, 1950. They met while they were both working towards an undergraduate degree at the University of Manitoba where John graduated with a bachelor's degree in arts and environmental studies in 1969 and Patricia graduated with a bachelor of interior design in 1973. They both went on to receive their Masters of Architecture, John continued at the University of Manitoba in 1973 and Patricia completed hers at Yale University in 1978.

=== Patkau Architects ===
The firm was founded by spouses John Patkau and Patricia Patkau in Edmonton, Alberta in 1978. It was relocated to Vancouver in 1984. Michael Cunningham was the third principal from 1995 until departing from the firm in 2010. As of 2014 the firm has a total staff of 20, including four principals: John Patkau, Patricia Patkau, Greg Boothroyd and David Shone. Patkau Architects has been one of the pioneers in using wood within the architectural industry and have received seven wood design awards starting in 1984.

Both Patricia Patkau and John Patkau are fellows of the Royal Architecture Institute of Canada, honorary fellows of the American Institute of Architects and of the Royal Institute of British Architects, members of the Royal Canadian Academy of Art, and members of the Order of Canada.

== Design approach ==
The firm's work has been noted for drawing on the principles of modern architecture that is also inspired by the natural setting and traditions of Canada's West Coast and the Pacific Northwest. Their designs are known for their sculptural quality, multifaceted expression of material, comfort, and clear delineation of detail. Patkau Architects draw inspiration from the natural environment and are currently pushing the limitations of wood in architecture. Their drive to pull as much from nature as possible has led them towards innovation in ways further than just using natural materials like wood; in the Temple of Light specifically, they used "light" as a primary building material. Architectural historian-theorist Kenneth Frampton has described the firm's work as "very close to what I attempted to define in 1983 as Critical Regionalism."

== Notable projects ==
=== University of Toronto Academic Wood Tower ===
Patkau Architects, alongside MJMA, designed a 15 storey wooden tower for the University of Toronto located in Toronto, Ontario to be used for classrooms and offices. It is designed to be 80 meters tall which will make it North America's tallest structural timber building. The entire structure of the tower is constructed using glu-laminated mass timber, some of which is left exposed to draw attention to the construction method. The design is hoping to create precedent for future mass timber construction as the zoning for height restrictions of tall wood buildings is being challenged in order to complete the project.

=== Capilano Library ===
The Capilano Library is a 10,000 square foot, all black, linear form with a statement roof that has multiple sharp undulations with a softer, wooden clad underside located in Edmonton, Alberta commissioned as a new branch for the Edmonton library. The library contains a children's area and a community room for meetings and events alongside the main library programming.

=== Temple of Light ===
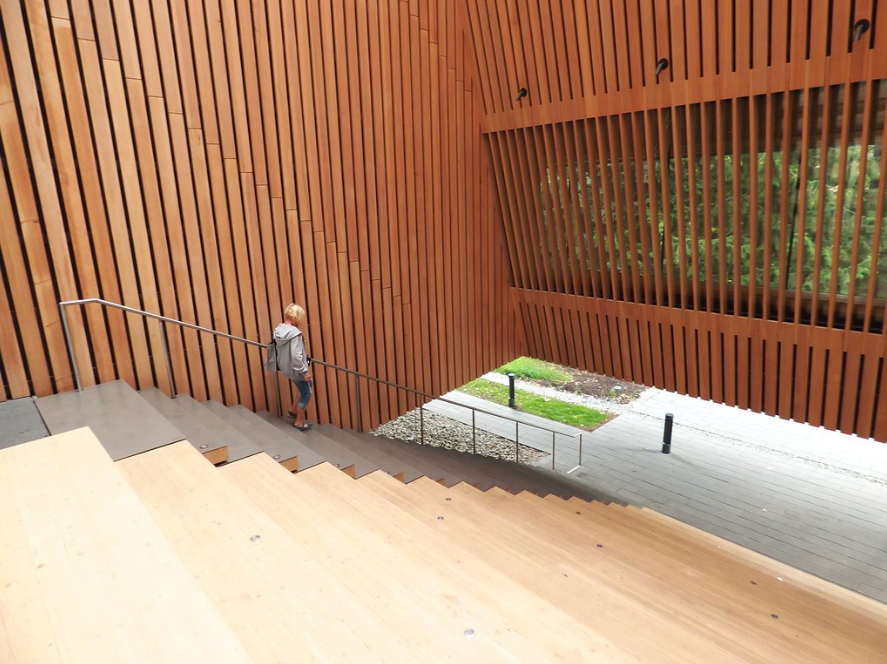
Audain Art Museum

The original Temple of Light, located in Vancouver, British Columbia, burnt down in June 2014. For the redesign, in order to bring nature and the sacred into the temple as much as possible, Patkau Architects created "portals of light" that extend from the oculus at the top throughout the entire height of the space. The form is made up of complex, petal-like shapes and was accomplished by fabricating panels off-site to be assembled together on the building site.

=== Audain Art Museum ===
The Audain Art Museum is a 56,000 square foot, two storey museum located in Whistler, British Columbia that houses Michael Audain's personal art collection. The museum is located on a flood plain at the base of Whistler Mountain, so the structure is raised one full storey on piers to avoid the flooding and implements a seismic system, steel trusses, prefabricated wood panels and handles cantilevers. A steel structural system was used to handle the large cantilevers.

=== Hadaway House ===
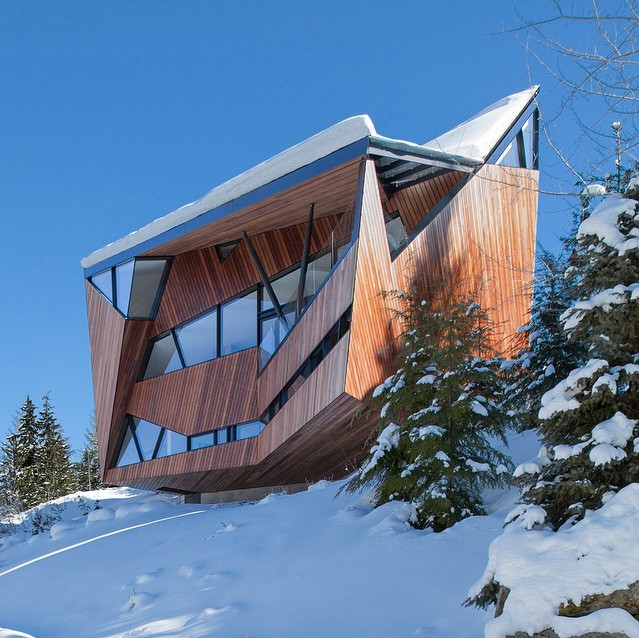
Hadaway House

Hadaway House is a private residence in Whistler, British Columbia. The shape of the house was designed based on the size and height restrictions of the area, as well as the need to shed snow off the roof. Whistler has very strict zoning regulations, so the design was started with the envelope instead of being designed from the inside out under normal circumstances. The construction of the house brings together various systems; it uses a concrete slab system with steel and heavy timber framing. These systems were all used in tandem to create the most efficient system overall to counteract the intense seismic and snow loads.

== List of projects ==
=== Residential ===
- 2023: Arbour House
- 2023: Point Grey House
- 2019: Trail's End House
- 2013: Hadaway House
- 2012: Tula House
- 2011: Mishrifah Villa
- Unrealized: Cottages at Fallingwater
- 2009: Linear House
- Prototype: Prototype Cottage
- 2000: Agosta House
- 2000: Shaw House
- 1998: La Petite Maison du Weekend
- 1993: Barnes House
- 1987: Porter-Vanderbosch Renovation
- 1986: Appleton House
- 1984: Patkau House
- 1983: Pyrch House

=== Educational ===
- Current: Academic Wood Tower University of Toronto
- Current: UBC Sauder Powerhouse Project
- Current: Concert Properties Centre for Trades and Technology
- 2025: UBC Gordon B. Shrum Building
- 2014: Goldring Centre for High Performance Sport
- 2012: Daegu Gosan Public Library
- 2012: ARTLab
- 2009: Beaty Biodiversity Center & Aquatic Ecosystems Research Laboratory
- 2005: Winnipeg Millennium Library
- 2005: Centre for Music Art and Design at University of Manitoba
- 2005: La Grande Bibliotheque du Quebec
- 1996: Nursing and Biomedical Sciences Building at the Texas Medical Center
- 1995: Strawberry Vale Elementary School
- 1995: Emily Carr College of Art & Design
- 1992: Newton Library
- 1991: Seabird Island School

=== Cultural ===
- Current: Thunder Bay Art Gallery
- 2025: Kìwekì Point & Pìdàban Bridge
- 2018: Capilano Library
- 2017: Temple of Light
- 2017: Polygon Gallery
- 2016: Audain Art Museum
- 2012: Fort York National Historic Site Visitors Centre
- 2012: Our Lady of the Assumption Parish Church
- 2012: Rift
- 2012: Cocoons
- 2011: Onefold
- Suspended: Marpole-Oakridge Community Center
- 2011: Winnipeg Skating Shelters
- 2011: Gleneagles Community Center
- 1999: Air Canada International Arrivals Lounge
- 1992: Newton Library
- 1992: Canadian Clay and Glass Library

== Awards ==
The firm has been the recipient of at least one architectural design award per year in every year but three since 1981. These awards include nineteen Governor General's Awards and Medals in Architecture, eight Architectural Institute of British Columbia's Lieutenant Governor's Awards, thirteen Canadian Architect Awards of Excellence, awards from the American Institute of Architects, Canadian Architect magazine, and various national and international design competitions. Most recently, they were awarded the Canadian Wood Council design innovation award for the Temple of Light in Kootenay Bay, British Columbia, Canada.

== Publications ==
There are three published books based on their career, including two self-written books. Each publication documents different projects representing different time periods of Patkau Architects' growth.

=== Biographical publications ===
==== Patkau Architects: projects, 1978–1990 by Andrew Gruft ====
Andrew Gruft published his essay on Patkau Architects in 1990. The essay catalogs an exhibition that the University of British Columbia's Fine Arts Gallery held in late 1990.

==== Patkau Architects by Brian Carter ====
Brian Carter wrote the book Patkau Architects: Selected Projects 1983–1994 which was published in 1994 and highlights their earlier works. This book covers 10 of Patkau Architects's projects that were at the forefront of innovation at the time.

==== Patkau Architects by Kenneth Frampton ====
Kenneth Frampton wrote his book Patkau Architects in 2006. The book reviews seventeen projects of all different categories including cultural and institutional, schools and residential.

===== Projects Mentioned =====
- Canadian Clay and Glass Gallery
- National Library of Quebec in Montreal
- Winnipeg Centennial Library addition
- Gleneagles Community Center
- North by Northwest
- Nursing and Biomedical Sciences Building at the University of Texas Houston Health Science Center
- New College House Student Residence at the University of Pennsylvania
- Seabird Island School
- Strawberry Vale School
- Newton Library
- Shaw House
- Petite Maison du Weekend
- Prototype Cottage
- Agosta House
- Barnes House
- Little House

=== Self-written publications ===
==== Patkau Architects: Material Operations ====
Patkau Architects wrote their book "Patkau Architects: Material Operations" and published it on the Princeton Architectural Press in New York in 2017. It goes into depth about the philosophy and techniques that drive the firm's designs.
