= Shirley Blumberg =

Canadian architect

- Born: February 4, 1952 (age 74); Cape Town, South Africa
- Education: University of Toronto (1976)
- Occupation: Architect
- Awards: Order of Canada
- Practice: KPMB Architects
- Website: http://www.kpmb.com/person/shirley-blumberg/

Shirley Blumberg (CM, OAA, FRAIC, AIA, RIBA) (born February 4, 1952) is a Canadian architect and a founding partner of KPMB Architects, established in Toronto in 1987. She has led many of the firm’s notable academic, cultural, workplace, and social housing projects in Canada and the United States.

Blumberg was invested as a Member of the Order of Canada in 2013 “for her contributions to architecture and for her commitment to creating spaces that foster a sense of community."

In 2025, she received the Royal Architectural Institute of Canada Gold Medal. In a May 2025 supplement published by Canadian Architect, urban designer Ken Greenberg wrote: “…what has set [Blumberg] apart is her passionate dedication to architecture as a social art." In the same issue, Ron McCoy, university architect at Princeton University, commented: “Through the beauty of her designs and her leadership within the profession, Shirley has made remarkable contributions to contemporary architecture throughout North America.”

Blumberg is also the recipient of the King Charles III Coronation Medal for Architecture. Her work has won numerous awards, including Governor General’s Medals in Architecture, Honours Awards from the American Institute of Architects (AIA), and International Awards from the Royal Institute of British Architects (RIBA).

== Education and early career ==
Blumberg was born in Cape Town, South Africa in 1952. In opposition to the apartheid regime in her home country, she immigrated to Canada in 1974, after working for a year in London, England. Having started her architectural education at the University of Cape Town, she completed her studies and graduated from the University of Toronto in 1976.

In 1977, she joined Barton Myers Associates in Toronto. Ten years in later, in 1987, she formed KPMB Architects — known as Kuwabara Payne McKenna and Blumberg Architects — with Bruce Kuwabara, Thomas Payne, and Marianne McKenna, then fellow associates at Barton Myers.

== Practice ==
Blumberg has led academic projects with institutions in Canada and the United States, including Princeton University, University of Pennsylvania, University of Toronto, McMaster University, University of Waterloo, Wilfrid Laurier University, and University of British Columbia.

Blumberg’s portfolio of cultural projects includes several museums and art galleries. An entrance pavilion addition to the Beaverbrook Art Gallery in Fredericton, New Brunswick was included in Domus magazine’s list of the 15 best architectural projects of 2023. A new building for the Montreal Holocaust Museum, won via international design competition, is currently under construction.

Growing up in South Africa during the apartheid era has motivated Blumberg to engage in advocacy and established social justice as a primary focus of her practice. Her portfolio includes affordable housing developments with Toronto Community Housing Corporation and a housing model co-created with Two Row Architect and the Fort Severn First Nation in northern Ontario. The latter was recognized with the 2021 World Architecture Festival Award for Social Equity.

== Contributions to the architectural community ==
Blumberg has taught and lectured in Canada, the United States, and Europe. She is currently engaged in a five-year research project on the Architecture of Law Schools throughout North America. In 2022, she completed a residency at the Canadian Centre for Architecture.

Blumberg has served on various juries and design review panels, including the City of Toronto Design Review Panel, the Toronto Community Housing (TCHC) Design Review Panel, the Regent Park Design Review Panel, and the Independent Design Review Panel for the Centre Block Redevelopment on Parliament Hill in Ottawa.

She has been actively engaged in advocacy throughout her career. In 2014, she co-led a successful campaign to stop a “politically charged proposal” for a monument to victims of communism from being constructed adjacent to the Supreme Court of Canada in Ottawa.

In 2015, inspired by the Order of Canada’s recognition and its motto “They desire a better country,” Blumberg began a conversation with like-minded female colleagues that became BEAT (Building Equality in Architecture in Toronto). The grassroots, volunteer-led initiative is dedicated to promoting and retaining women in the profession. There are now 8 chapters across Canada. In 2024, BEAT received the Royal Architectural Institute of Canada's Advocate for Architecture Award.

== Selected Projects ==
- In progress: Tyndale Green, North York, Ontario
- In progress: Montreal Holocaust Museum, Montreal, Quebec (in association with DLLS Architects)
- In progress: Peter Munk Cardiac Centre Entrance Pavilion, Toronto, Ontario
- 2024: Landscape of Landmark Quality, University of Toronto, Toronto, Ontario (with Michael Van Valkenburgh Associates)
- 2022: Harrison McCain Pavilion, Beaverbrook Art Gallery, Fredericton, New Brunswick
- 2021: Dominion Foundry Demonstration Project (Concept), Toronto, Ontario
- 2020: Downsview Framework Plan, Toronto, Ontario
- 2020: Resilient Duplex for Fort Severn First Nation, Fort Severn, Ontario (with Two Row Architect)
- 2020: Corporate Offices in Hudson Yards, New York, New York
- 2020: Lawrence Heights Blocks 1B Revitalization, Toronto, Ontario (in association with Page and Steele/IBI Group)
- 2019: Robertson Hall Renovation, Princeton University, Princeton, New Jersey
- 2019: The Wyatt, Block 26, Regent Park Redevelopment, Toronto, Ontario
- 2018: Lawrence Heights Blocks 1A Revitalization, Toronto, Ontario (in association with Page and Steele/IBI Group)
- 2018: Ronald O. Perelman Center for Political Science and Economics, University of Pennsylvania, Philadelphia, Pennsylvania
- 2017: Remai Modern, Saskatoon, Saskatchewan (in joint venture with Architecture 49)
- 2017: Global Centre for Pluralism, Aga Khan Foundation Canada, Ottawa, Ontario
- 2017: Julis Romo Rabinowitz Building & Louis A. Simpson International Building (Department of Economics), Princeton University, Princeton, New Jersey
- 2017: Campus Framework Plan, Princeton University, New Jersey (with Urban Strategies and Michael Van Valkenburgh Associates)
- 2017: Infrastructure Masterplan & Energy Efficient Building Study, Princeton University, Princeton, New Jersey (with Transsolar KlimaEngineering and Behnisch Architekten)
- 2016: Jack Layton Ferry Terminal Phase 1 Masterplan (Competition Winner), Toronto, Ontario (with West 8 and Greenberg Associates)
- 2015: Ponderosa Commons (Phases 1 and 2), University of British Columbia, Vancouver, British Columbia (in joint venture with HCMA)
- 2015: Robert H. Lee Alumni Centre, University of British Columbia, Vancouver, British Columbia (in joint venture with HCMA)
- 2014: Fort York Branch Library, Toronto, Ontario
- 2013: Elementary Teachers' Federation of Ontario Headquarters, Toronto, Ontario
- 2012: 150 Dan Leckie Way, Toronto Community Housing Corporation, Toronto, Ontario (in association with Page and Steele/IBI Group)
- 2011: Centre for International Governance Innovation (CIGI) Campus, Waterloo, Ontario
- 2010: TIFF Lightbox, Toronto, Ontario (with Kirkor Architects)
- 2009: One Bedford, Toronto, Ontario (with Page and Steele)
- 2008: SugarCube mixed-use development, Denver, Colorado
- 2008: Japanese Canadian Cultural Centre, Toronto, Ontario
- 2006: Gardiner Museum, Toronto, Ontario
- 2005: Canada's National Ballet School (in joint venture with Goldsmith Borgal & Company Ltd. Architects), Toronto, Ontario
- 2004: Faculty of Management Building, University of Toronto Scarborough (UTSC), Toronto, Ontario
- 2004: Applied Research and Innovation Centre, Centennial College, Toronto, Ontario
- 2003: James Stewart Centre for Mathematics, McMaster University, Hamilton, Ontario
- 1997: Ammirati Puris Lintas corporate offices, New York City, New York
- 1994: The Design Exchange, Toronto, Ontario
- 1994: Hasbro Inc. Corporate Headquarters, Pawtucket, Rhode Island

== Selected publications ==
- 2023: "Let’s work together for a better future for Ontario Place and the Ontario Science Centre"; Blumberg, Shirley; Toronto Star
- 2022: “Diving Deep: KPMB’s Shirley Blumberg and Marianne McKenna on Designing with Generosity, Giving People Choice, and Intergenerational Dialogue"; Gamolina, Julia; Madame Architect
- 2022: "The Women Who Changed Architecture"; Cigliano Hartman, Jan; Princeton Architectural Press
- 2021: “Driven by Disease"; Blumberg, Shirley; ARCHITECT
- 2020: “Epidemics, architecture, and city-building"; Blumberg, Shirley; Canadian Architect
- 2020: Women [Re]Build: Stories, Polemics, Futures; Trubiano, Franca, Adlakha, Ramona, Bartuskaite, Ramune; ORO Editions
- 2019: Breaking Ground: Architecture by Women; Hall, Jane; Phaidon
- 2019: “30 (More) Essential Women in Architecture and Design”; AZURE
- 2013: Kuwabara Payne McKenna Blumberg Architects; Birkhäuser
- 2004: The Architecture of Kuwabara Payne McKenna Blumberg Architects; Birkhäuser
- 1998: Kuwabara Payne McKenna Blumberg; Rockport
