= Marianne McKenna =

Canadian architect

Marianne McKenna, OC, FRAIC, OAA, OAQ, AIA, RIBA (born September 25, 1950) is a Canadian architect and a founding partner of KPMB Architects, a Toronto-based practice established in 1987. She is an invested Officer of The Order of Canada "for her contributions as an architect, designing structures that enrich the public realm".

McKenna has led a wide range of projects across the cultural, educational, business, hospitality, and science sectors in Canada and the United States. They include the renovation and expansion of The Royal Conservatory TELUS Centre for Performance and Learning and Koerner Hall (2010 Governor General's Medal), a renovation and expansion of the historic Massey Hall in Toronto, the design of the Kellogg School of Management at Northwestern University, and a vertical campus building for The Brearley School, an independent all-girls school in New York City.

Her current projects include the Dramatics Art Building at Yale University, the Werklund Centre Transformation (formerly Arts Commons) in Calgary, 300 Bloor Street West in Toronto, the redevelopment of St. Monica's Parish in Toronto, and a series of purpose-built rental housing communities with developer Kindred Works in locations across Canada.

McKenna is a recipient of the King Charles III Coronation Medal and the Royal Architectural Institute of Canada's gold medal. In 2023, she received an honorary Doctorate of Arts degree from Swarthmore College. She was the first woman to receive a Lifetime Achievement Award from the Design Futures Council.

In 2010, McKenna was named one of Canada’s Top 100 Most Powerful Women. She has also been named one of Toronto’s top 50 Powerful People by MacLean’s Magazine, one of the 50 Most Influential Torontonians by Toronto Life, and one of 30 Essential Women in Architecture and Design by Azure Magazine.

== Education and early career ==
McKenna was born in Montreal, Quebec in 1950. She graduated from The Study, a Canadian private education all-girls school in Westmount, Quebec in 1968 and was honoured by The Study in 2008 with the Judy Elder Alumna Award. To the students of The Study, she explained her choice to pursue architecture as follows: "I originally saw the profession as a balance between creative and business skills. I found out quite early that it is much more than that. It is a creative profession but requires the leadership skills of innovator, arbitrator, negotiator, communicator, along with strong design talent and business acumen. The pleasure of architecture is in the range of challenges that only increase from day to day."

McKenna is an alumnus of Swarthmore College (B.A. 1972) and has a Master of Architecture from Yale University (M.A., 1976), where she studied under architects Harry Cobb of Pei Cobb Freed & Partners and Charles Moore. At Yale University, she also met and became lifelong friends with then aspiring actress Meryl Streep. Streep shared insights on Marianne’s career as an architect in the 2014 documentary "Making Space: 5 Women Changing the Face of Architecture" and in the May 2025 issue of Canadian Architect magazine.

Upon graduation from Yale, McKenna worked for Bobrow & Fieldman, Architects in Montreal from 1976 to 1978 and Denys, Lasdun, Redhouse & Softely in London from 1978 to 1979. In 1980 she joined Barton Myers Associates (BMA) in Toronto and was made an associate the following year. At BMA she met her future partners, also associates of Myers: Bruce Kuwabara, Thomas Payne and Shirley Blumberg. Notable projects she worked on in this period include the Hasbro Inc. New York showrooms and 35 East Wacker Drive in Chicago.

== Practice ==
When Barton Myers relocated his office to Los Angeles in 1987, McKenna formed Kuwabara Payne McKenna Blumberg Architects (KPMB Architects) with Bruce Kuwabara, Thomas Payne and Shirley Blumberg. Early in the practice, the editorial director of Progressive Architecture, Thomas R. Fisher, wrote: "...KPMB is particularly noteworthy because it has developed a more open, hybrid form of architecture and has taken the much more unusual step of structuring its practice along the same lines. The partnership, for example, is a mix of people of different genders, religious beliefs, ethnic backgrounds and political inclinations...theirs, in other words, is neither the autonomous individualism of the ‘star’ design firm nor the rather anonymous specialization of corporate-type firms, but a more diverse and less structured hybridization of those older models."

With her partners, McKenna developed an approach where each of the four partners is either in charge of their respective projects or collaborates strategically to combine strengths in leadership and design on large-scale, complex initiatives, leading teams through all phases from design concept to delivery. Simultaneous to the project work, the partnership shares responsibility for directing the strategy and management of all four core areas of practice: business development, design, finance, marketing and administration. In 2012, the name of the partnership changed to KPMB Architects. KPMB Architects is today recognized as a leading Canadian practice.

== Projects and contributions ==
The architecture of concert halls is one of McKenna’s areas of focus. McKenna is responsible for the transformation and expansion of The Royal Conservatory into a Toronto cultural destination. Her work began with the 1990 Master Plan, continued for over a decade with phased and various projects including Ettore Mazzoleni Concert Hall and culminated with the TELUS Performance and Learning Centre (2008) and Koerner Hall (2009), which has been referred to by media as the “jewel in the crown of Toronto’s cultural renaissance”. The design achieved numerous awards, including the Governor General’s Medal in 2012. For her outstanding contribution and commitment, Marianne was made an Honorary Fellow of the Royal Conservatory in 2011.

Reflecting on her work at the Conservatory, McKenna says, "The wonderful part of this project is the opportunity to overlay so many aspects of music, from the teaching and practicing of the students, to the performance of faculty and musicians from across the city and around the world. The buildings, both the historic stone fabric and the more contemporary fabric stretched across the site, become a crucible for amazing musical variations."

McKenna also led the renewal of Orchestra Hall in Minneapolis (2017 Architectural Record, “Good Design is Good Business Award”), the expansion of the Jenny Belzberg Theatre at the Banff Centre for Arts and Creativity in Banff, Alberta, and the multi-phase renovation and expansion of the iconic Massey Hall and Allied Music Centre in Toronto.

McKenna’s educational projects for science, engineering, business, and liberal arts programs include the Kellogg School of Management at Northwestern University, the Rotman School of Management at the University of Toronto (2014 Governor General’s Medal, Architectural Record "Good Design is Good Business Award"), the Mike and Ophelia Lazaridis Quantum-Nano Centre at the University of Waterloo, the McGill University and Génome Québec Innovation Centre in Montreal, and Le Quartier Concordia, an integrated vertical campus for Concordia University in downtown Montreal.

As partner-in-charge, McKenna has directed many of KPMB’s projects including the Rotman School of Management at the University of Toronto (2014 Governor General’s Award and Architectural Record "Good Design is Good Business Award"); the Jackson-Triggs Niagara Estate Winery in Niagara-on-the-Lake (Canada’s selection at the 2002 Green Building Challenge in Oslo, Norway); the Master Plan for Ryerson University (2010 American Institute of Architects Honor Award); the Grand Valley Institution for Women (1997 Governor's General Medal); the restoration and expansion of Park Hyatt Toronto; an office and event space for The Globe and Mail; and offices for Torys LLP, Woodbridge Co. Ltd., and Gluskin Sheff .

McKenna also developed and implemented the professional practice course at the University of Toronto’s John H. Daniels Faculty of Architecture, Landscape and Design. In the fall of 2016, she was the Lord Norman R. Foster Visiting Professor at Yale University. She previously served on the advisory board for the McEwen School of Architecture at Laurentian University, which awarded McKenna an Honorary Doctorate of Laws (honoris causa) degree in June 2017. In 2025, she served on the design jury for the Holcim Foundation Awards.

== Notable projects ==
2023: Scotiabank North Flagship Offices, Toronto, Ontario
2023: Alumnae House Renovation, Smith College, Northampton, Massachusetts
2022: Duan Family Center for Computing & Data Sciences, Boston University, Boston, Massachusetts
2021: Allied Music Centre & Massey Hall Renovation and Expansion (Phase 2), Toronto, Ontario
2020: Jenny Belzberg Theatre at Banff Centre for Arts and Creativity, Banff, Alberta
2020: Park Hyatt Toronto Renovation, Toronto, Ontario
2020: Massey Hall Renovation and Expansion (Phase 2), Toronto, Ontario
2020: Bloor Street United Church (300 Bloor West), Toronto, Ontario
2019: The Brearley School, New York, New York
2018: Lloyd Hall Renovation, Banff Centre for Art and Creativity, Banff, Alberta
2017: The Globe and Mail Office Interiors and Corporate Event Space, Toronto, Ontario
2017: Kellogg School of Management, Northwestern University, Evanston, Illinois
2016: Thornwood House, Toronto, Ontario
2015: Torys LLP Offices, Montreal, Quebec
2015: St. Michael's Cathedral Block Master Plan, Toronto, Ontario
2015: Massey Hall Renovation and Expansion (Phase 1), Toronto, Ontario
2013: Orchestra Hall Renewal, Minnesota Orchestra, Minneapolis, Minnesota
2013: Conrad Hotel, Lobby Interior/Custom Furniture/Standard Room Design, New York City. New York
2012: Roy Thompson Hall Wine Bar, Toronto, Ontario
2012: The Joseph L. Rotman School of Management Expansion, University of Toronto, Toronto, Ontario
2012: Mike & Ophelia Lazaridis Quantum-Nano Centre, University of Waterloo, Waterloo, Ontario
2012: Torys LLP Offices, Calgary, Alberta
2011: Guy-Metro Building Recladding, Concordia University, Montreal, Quebec (in joint venture with Fichten Soiferman et Associés Architectes)
2010: Rosedale Golf Clubhouse Enhancement Feasibility Study, Toronto, Ontario
2009: The Royal Conservatory of Music, Koerner Hall, Toronto, Ontario
2009: John Molson School of Business, Concordia University, Montreal, Quebec (in joint venture with Fichten Soiferman et Associés Architectes)
2009: Branksome Hall Master Plan Update, Toronto, Ontario
2008: The Royal Conservatory of Music, TELUS Centre for Performance and Learning, Toronto, Ontario
2008: Torys LLP Offices, Toronto, Ontario
2008: Ryerson University Master Plan, Toronto, Ontario (in joint venture with Daoust Lestage inc. and in association with Greenberg Consultants Inc. and IBI Group)
2008: CTV Executive Offices, Toronto, Ontario
2005: Woodbridge Office, Toronto, Ontario
2005: Engineering/Computer Science and Visual Arts Integrated Complex, Concordia University, Montreal, Quebec (in joint venture with Fichten Soiferman et Associés Architectes)
2003: McGill University and Génome Québec Innovation Centre, Montreal, Quebec (in joint venture with Fichten Soiferman et Associés Architectes)
2003: St. Andrew's College Aurora, Ontario
2002: Roy Thompson Hall Enhancement, Toronto, Ontario 2001: Jackson-Triggs Niagara Estate Winery, Niagara-on-the-Lake, Ontario
1998: McKee Public School, North York, Ontario
1998: Mitchell Field Community Centre, North York, Ontario
1997: Indigo Books and Music, Retail Stores, Burlington, Toronto, Kingston, Ontario
1997: Ettore Mazzoleni Concert Hall at the Royal Conservatory of Music, Toronto, Ontario
1996: Grand Valley Institution for Women, Kitchener, Ontario
1995: Gluskin Sheff & Associates, Corporate Offices, Toronto, Ontario
1993: Kitchener City Hall, Kitchener, Ontario
1991: The Royal Conservatory of Music, Master Plan, Toronto, Ontario
