= Bruce Kuwabara =

Canadian architect

Bruce Bunji Kuwabara, (OC, B.Arch, OAA, FRAIC, AIA, RIBA) is a Canadian architect and a founding partner of the firm KPMB Architects (formed in 1987). He is an invested Officer of the Order of Canada and recipient of the RAIC Gold Medal. He is Board Chair of the Canadian Centre for Architecture in Montreal.

== Life ==
Born in Hamilton, Ontario in 1949, Bruce Kuwabara studied architecture at the University of Toronto and graduated in 1972.

Upon graduation, Kuwabara joined the teaching studio of George Baird, an architect and architectural theorist. Baird was influential to Kuwabara's interest in ideas of city building and the narrative concept of architecture. It was in Baird's studio that Kuwabara also encountered many of the most influential architects of the time, including James Stirling, Arata Isozaki, and Leon Krier. Following the apprenticeship with Baird, Kuwabara joined Barton Myers Associates where he was an associate for 12 years. Barton Myers, who studied under the leading American architect, Louis Kahn (1901-1974), inspired Kuwabara, and his future partners who were also associates of BMA – Thomas Payne, Marianne McKenna and Shirley Blumberg - to think about the city, and how to integrate strategies of urban infill and consolidation.

== Honours ==
In 2011, Kuwabara was made an Officer of the Order of Canada "for his contributions, as an architect, to our built landscape and for his commitment to professional excellence". He is the recipient of the RAIC 2006 Gold Medal. The medal recognizes Kuwabara's contribution to the profession of architecture and is Canada's highest honour bestowed by the profession on an individual. In his acceptance speech, Kuwabara offered a personal reflection contrasting the memories of growing up in the post-World War II climate as a Japanese-Canadian with the later inspirations of his mentors and seminal events that determined his vocation as an architect.

His reflections of the collaborative nature of architecture and an overview of his practice is featured in a special supplement published by Canadian Architect in the June 2006 issue, with essays by George Baird and Larry Richards who wrote: "From his collaborative contributions on large urban projects with Barton Myers in the 1970s to his conceptions for complex city fabric insertions during the past decade…, Kuwabara has demonstrated remarkable leadership as an accomplished architect-urbanist with a very particular sense of the design and health of cities."

Bruce was elected into the Royal Canadian Academy of Arts in 2005.

== Sustainable design ==
Long before the environment was considered a priority issue in Canada, Kuwabara was studying and prioritizing strategies for integrating sustainability with architectural design. His involvement as the design principal for the Canadian Embassy in Berlin (joint venture of KPMB with Gagnon Letellier Cyr Architectes, and Smith Carter Architects + Engineers) presented the opportunity to study and integrate international strategies for reducing energy consumption and developing a healthy, sustainable work environment. These lessons would greatly influence future projects in Canada, particularly Manitoba Hydro Place in downtown Winnipeg.

Manitoba Hydro Place is one of the most energy efficient large-scale office towers in the world and establish a model for extreme climate design in Canada and internationally. This project is the product of a collaboration with Transsolar and Smith Carter Architects + Engineers. The project was realized through a formal C-2000 Integrated Design Process (IDP) to achieve 60% reduction in energy consumption with a signature design and catalyze the urban revitalization of the downtown. The building exceeded original goals for LEED Gold and was certified LEED Platinum in 2012.

== Architecture and education ==
Kuwabara and KPMB have supported the John H. Daniels Faculty of Architecture, Landscape and Design, at the University of Toronto as well as contributed to its curriculum. Specifically, Kuwabara helped to establish the Frank Gehry Chair for International Visitors in Architectural Design, as well as to the Faculty's ongoing building renovations. As co-chair of the University's Design the Future campaign, Kuwabara played a key role in spearheading funding for the Gehry Chair. In recognition of his contribution, he was presented with the Arbor Award for "outstanding personal service to the University of Toronto and its divisions."

== Selected work ==
Selected work (with KPMB) includes:

2019: Science Commons / Science & Academic Building, University of Lethbridge (with Stantec Architecture)
2018: Ronald O. Perelman Center for Political Science and Economics, University of Pennsylvania, Philadelphia, PA
2018: Chip and Shannon Wilson School of Design, Kwantlen Polytechnic University, Richmond, British Columbia (in joint venture with Public: Architecture + Communication)
2017: Remai Modern, Saskatoon, Saskatchewan
2017: Global Center for Pluralism, Ottawa, Ontario
2017: Kellogg School of Management, Northwestern University, Evanston, Illinois
2017: Julis Romo Rabinowitz Building & Louis A. Simpson International Building, Princeton University, Princeton, New Jersey
2016: Bay Adelaide East Tower and Podium, Toronto, Ontario
2015: Pan/Parapan American Games Athletes' Village / Canary District, Toronto, Ontario (Dundee Kilmer Integrated Design Team: joint venture architectsAlliance and KPMB Architects in association with Daoust Lestage Inc., McClennan Jaunkalns Miller Architects)
2015: St. Michael's Cathedral Block Master Plan, Toronto, Ontario
2013: Bridgepoint Active Healthcare, Toronto, Ontario (in joint venture with Stantec Architecture / KPMB Architects, Planning, Design and Compliance Architects, HDR Architecture / Diamond Schmitt Architects, Design, Build, Finance and Maintain Architects)
2013: Elementary Teachers' Federation of Ontario, Toronto, Ontario
2013: Orchestra Hall Renewal, Minnesota Orchestra, Minneapolis, Minnesota
2012: George Brown College, Waterfront Campus, Toronto, Ontario (in joint venture with Stantec Architecture)
2012: The Joseph L. Rotman School of Management Expansion, University of Toronto, Toronto, Ontario
2011: Vaughan City Hall, Vaughan, Ontario
2011: Gluskin Sheff & Associates, Toronto, Ontario
2011: Centre for International Governance Innovation (CIGI) Campus, Waterloo, Ontario
2011: The Power Plant Gallery, Toronto, Ontario
2011: Maple Leaf Square (Bremner Blvd), Toronto, Ontario (in joint venture with Page+Steele, architects of record)
2010: TIFF Bell Lightbox and Festival Tower, Toronto, Ontario (in joint venture with Kirkor Architects & Planners, architects of record)
2010: Canadian Museum of Nature, Ottawa Ontario (in joint venture with Barry Padolsky Associates Inc. Architects and Gagnon Letellier Cyr Ricard Mathieu Architectes)
2009: Le Quartier Concordia Phase 2: John Molson School of Business, Concordia University, Montreal, Quebec (in joint venture with Fichten Soiferman et Associés Architectes)
2009: Block 24 E, Railway Lands West (NEO & Montage), Toronto, Ontario (in joint venture with Page + Steele Inc., architect of record)
2009: Manitoba Hydro Place, Winnipeg, Manitoba (in joint venture with Smith Carter Architects & Engineers, Executive Architect; Transsolar, Specialist Energy/Climate Engineer; Prairie Architects Inc., Advocate Architect)
2009: One Bedford Residential Development, Toronto, Ontario
2008: Centre for Addiction and Mental Health (CAMH), Phase 1A: Alternate Milieu, Toronto, Ontario (in joint venture with C3 Consortium, Montgomery Sisam Architects Inc. and Kearns Mancini Architects)
2008: SugarCube, Denver, Colorado
2008: Japanese Canadian Cultural Centre, Toronto, Ontario
2007: Ryerson University Master Plan, Toronto, Ontario (in joint venture with Daoust Lestage Inc., Greenberg Consultants Inc. and IBI Group)
2006: Gardiner Museum, Toronto, Ontario
2005: Canada's National Ballet School, Toronto, Ontario (in joint venture with Goldsmith Borgal & Company Ltd. Architects)
2005: Art Gallery of Hamilton, Hamilton, Ontario
2005: Le Quartier Concordia Phase 1: Engineering/Computer Science and Visual Arts Complex, Concordia University, Montreal, Quebec (in joint venture with Fichten Soiferman et Associés Architectes)
2005: Canadian Embassy, Berlin, Germany (in joint venture with Gagnon Letellier Cyr, architectes and Smith Carter Architects Engineers)
2004: Japanese Canadian Cultural Centre, Don Mills, Ontario

2003: 740 Dr Penfield Avenue, McGill University, Montreal, Quebec.
2003: James Stewart Centre for Mathematics, McMaster University, Hamilton, Ontario
2003: Centennial College Applied Research and Innovation Centre, Scarborough, Ontario
2002: Ravine House, Toronto, Ontario
2001: Jackson-Triggs Niagara Estate Winery, Niagara-on-the-Lake, Ontario
2001: Star Alliance Lounge, Zurich, Nagoya and Los Angeles
2000: Richmond City Hall, Richmond, British Columbia (in joint venture with Hotson Bakker Architects)
2000: Cardinal Ambrozic Houses of Providence, Scarborough, Ontario (in joint venture with Montgomery Sisam Architects)
2000: Goodman Theatre, Chicago, Illinois, 1999: Chinese Cultural Centre/Community Complex, Scarborough, Ontario (in joint venture with Patrick T.Y. Chan Architect)
1998: McKee Public School, North York, Ontario
1997: Ammirati Puris Lintas, New York City, New York
1997: Indigo Books and Music, Burlington, Toronto and Kingston, Ontario
1996: Grand Valley Institution for Women, Kitchener, Ontario
1994: Design Exchange, Toronto, Ontario
1993: Kitchener City Hall, Kitchener, Ontario
1991: King James Place, Toronto, Ontario
1991: Reisman-Jenkinson Residence, Richmond Hill, Ontario
1987: Marc Laurent, Toronto, Ontario

=== Work in progress ===
Center for Computing & Data Sciences, Boston University
Bay Adelaide Centre, North Tower, Toronto (with Adamson Associates)
Contemporary Calgary, Calgary (with Gibbs Gage Architects)
Landscape of Landmark Quality, University of Toronto, Toronto, Ontario
11 Wellesley, Toronto, Ontario (in joint venture with Page+Steele / IBI Group)

== Publications ==
- George Baird, Thomas Fisher, Mark Kingwell and Mirko Zardini. Kuwabara Payne McKenna Blumberg Architects. Basel, Switzerland: Birkhäuser, 2013.
- Lambert, Phyllis, Detlef Mertins, Bruce Mau and Rodolphe el-Khoury. The Architecture of Kuwabara Payne McKenna Blumberg Architects. Basel, Berlin, Boston: Birkhäuser - Publishers for Architecture, 2004.
- Kuwabara Payne McKenna Blumberg. A monograph in the Contemporary World Architects series. USA: Rockport Publishers Inc., 1998. [foreword by George Baird; introduction by Detlef Mertins]

== See also ==
- Architecture of Toronto
- KPMB Architects
