= KPMB Architects =

Canadian architectural firm

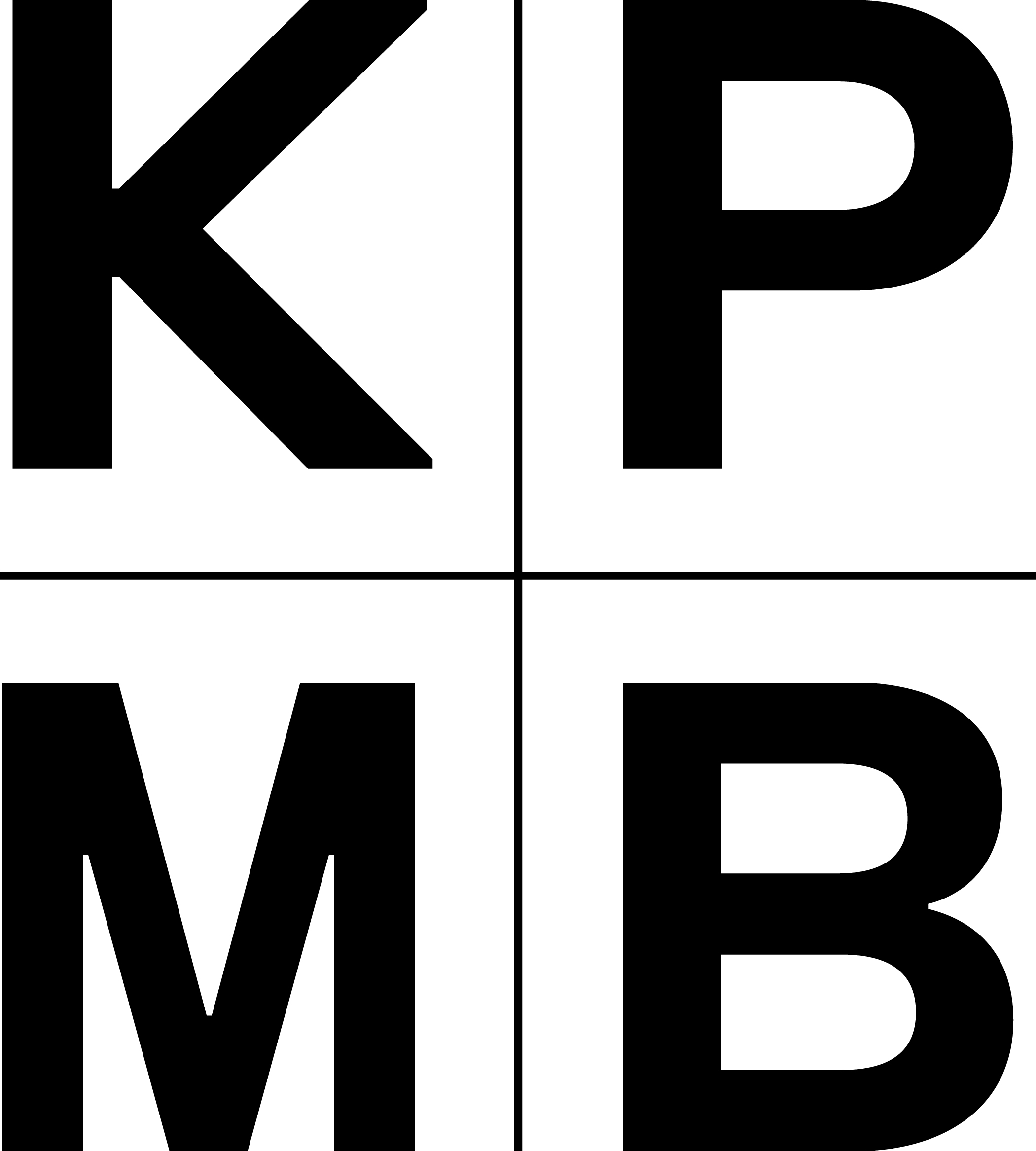

Practice information
- Key architects: Bruce Kuwabara, Thomas Payne, Marianne McKenna, Shirley Blumberg
- Founded: 1987
- Location: Toronto

Significant works and honors
- Buildings: TIFF Bell Lightbox, Gardiner Museum, National Ballet School of Canada, Art Gallery of Hamilton, Canadian Museum of Nature, Koerner Hall
- Awards: American Institute of Architects Honor Award for Architecture, Governor General's Award, RAIC National Urban Design Award, Ontario Association of Architects Award of Excellence, Toronto Urban Design Award

KPMB is a Canadian architecture firm founded by Bruce Kuwabara, Thomas Payne, Marianne McKenna, and Shirley Blumberg, in 1987. It is headquartered in Toronto, where the majority of their work is found. Aside from designing buildings, the firm also works in interior design. KPMB Architects was officially renamed from Kuwabara Payne McKenna Blumberg Architects to KPMB Architects on February 12, 2013.

== Firm history ==
KPMB Architects’ four founding partners were former associates of Barton Myers Associates, until Myers permanently relocated his practice to his Los Angeles office. Kuwabara, Payne, McKenna and Blumberg stayed in Toronto and formed their own studio. Thomas Payne left the firm to start a multidisciplinary architectural studio in 2013.

== Early works ==
KPMB's early projects were completed in association with Barton Myers, including Woodsworth College at the University of Toronto (1991) and the Art Gallery of Ontario Stage III Expansion (1992). Early on in the practice, KPMB won two major competitions: Kitchener City Hall and the Joseph S. Stauffer Library, the new central library for Queen's University in Kingston, ON.

== KPMB and Toronto ==
Many of KPMB's projects are found in their home town of Toronto. Early projects involved retrofits and infill projects juxtaposed with existing structures, including King James Place (1991) on Toronto's King Street East and the Design Exchange (1994), a retrofit of Toronto's former Stock Exchange building into an exhibition space for design.

In the 21st century KPMB completed a number of cultural facilities that contribute to what is known as the "Toronto Cultural Renaissance": Roy Thomson Hall Enhancement (2002) home of the Toronto Symphony Orchestra, Canada's National Ballet School (2005) with Goldsmith Borgal Architects, the Gardiner Museum (2006), Young Centre for the Performing Arts (2006), TELUS Centre for Performance and Learning at the Royal Conservatory (2009), and the TIFF Bell Lightbox (2010) a permanent home for the Toronto International Film Festival.

== Work outside of Toronto and Canada ==
KPMB has a diverse portfolio of work across Canada, the United States and Europe.

Canadian projects include Le Quartier Concordia at Concordia University, the Remai Modern public art museum in Saskatchewan, and the LEED Platinum Headquarters Manitoba Hydro Place in Winnipeg, which some consider North America's most complex energy-efficient buildings in one of its most challenging climates. In 2022, KPMB Architects was named as the lead designer for the United Church of Canada's Kindred Works project, to transform underutilized United Church properties, including Toronto's Saint Luke's United Church, into multi-unit residential buildings housing 34,000 people over 15 years.

American projects include the Walgreen Drama Center for the University of Michigan, Sprague Memorial Hall for Yale University and the Goodman Theatre in Chicago. KPMB's current work includes projects for Princeton University, Orchestra Hall for the Minnesota Orchestra in Minneapolis and the Kellogg School of Management at Northwestern University.

== Major projects ==
=== Canada ===
- Kitchener City Hall, Kitchener, Ontario, 1993
- Design Exchange, Toronto, Ontario, 1994
- Royal Conservatory, Ettore Mazzoleni Hall, Toronto, Ontario, 1997
- Stratford Festival Theatre Renewal, Stratford, Ontario, 1993
- McKee Public School, North York, Ontario, 1998
- Richmond City Hall, Richmond, British Columbia, 2000
- Jackson-Triggs Niagara Estate Winery, Niagara-on-the-Lake, Ontario, 2001
- Ravine House, Toronto, Ontario, 2002
- Roy Thomson Hall, Enhancement, Toronto, Ontario, 2002
- St. Andrew's College, Aurora, Ontario, 2003
- McGill University and Génome Québec Innovation Centre, Montreal, Quebec, 2003
- James Stewart Centre for Mathematics, McMaster University, Hamilton, Ontario, 2003
- Centennial College Applied Research and Innovation Centre, Toronto, Ontario, 2004
- Art Gallery of Hamilton, Hamilton, Ontario, 2005
- Canada's National Ballet School, Project Grand Jeté, Toronto, Ontario, 2005
- Le Quartier Concordia University, Engineering, Computer Science and Visual Arts, Montreal, Quebec, 2005
- Woodbridge Offices, Toronto, Ontario, 2005
- 180 Queen Street West, Toronto, Ontario, 2006
- Young Centre for the Performing Arts, Toronto, Ontario, 2006
- Gardiner Museum, Toronto, Ontario, 2006
- Ryerson University (now Toronto Metropolitan University) Master Plan, Toronto, Ontario, 2007
- CTV Television Network Executive Offices, Toronto, Ontario, 2008
- Nota Bene Restaurant, Toronto, Ontario, 2008
- Torys LLP, Toronto, Ontario, 2008
- One Bedford Residential Development, Toronto, Ontario, 2009
- Branksome Hall Master Plan Update, Toronto, Ontario, 2009
- Block 24 E, Railway Lands West – Neo & Montage Condominiums, Toronto, Ontario, 2009
- Manitoba Hydro Place, Winnipeg, Manitoba, 2009
- Royal Conservatory TELUS Centre for Performance and Learning, Toronto, Ontario, 2009
- Le Quartier Concordia University, John Molson School of Business, Montreal, Quebec, 2009
- Canadian Museum of Nature, Ottawa, Ontario, 2010
- TIFF Bell Lightbox, Toronto, Ontario, 2010
- Rosedale Clubhouse, Enhancement Feasibility Study, Toronto, Ontario, 2010
- Le Quartier Concordia University, Guy-Métro Building Recladding, Montreal, Quebec, 2011
- Maple Leaf Square, Bremner Blvd, Toronto, Ontario, 2011
- The Power Plant Gallery, Refresh, Toronto, Ontario, 2011
- Gluskin Sheff & Asscoaites, Toronto, Ontario, 2011
- Vaughan City Hall, Vaughan, Ontario, 2011
- Centre for International Governance Innovation Campus, Waterloo, Ontario, 2011
- Southcore Financial Centre, PricewaterhouseCoopers Tower, Toronto, Ontario, 2011
- Torys LLP, Calgary, Alberta, 2012
- Roy Thomson Hall, Wine Bar, Toronto, Ontario, 2012
- 150 Dan Leckie Way, Toronto Community Housing Corporation, Toronto, Ontario, 2012
- George Brown College, Daphne Cockwell Centre for Health Sciences, Toronto, Ontario, 2012
- Mike & Ophelia Lazaridis Quantum-Nano Centre, University of Waterloo, Waterloo, Ontario, 2012
- The Joseph L. Rotman School of Management Expansion, University of Toronto, Toronto, Ontario, 2012
- Munk School of Global Affairs, University of Toronto, Toronto, Ontario, 2012
- Elementary Teachers' Federation of Ontario, Toronto, Ontario, 2013
- Sugino Studio, Toronto, Ontario, 2013
- Bridgepoint Health, Toronto, Ontario, 2013
- Ponderosa Commons, University of British Columbia, Vancouver, British Columbia, (Phase 1), 2013
- Fort York Branch Library, Toronto, Ontario, 2014
- Library District Condominiums, Toronto, Ontario, 2014
- Southcore Financial Centre, Bremner Tower, Toronto, Ontario, 2015
- Torys LLP, Montreal, Quebec, 2015
- 2015 Pan American Games/Parapan American Games Athletes’ Village | Canary District, Toronto, Ontario, 2015
- Robert H. Lee Alumni Centre, University of British Columbia, Vancouver, British Columbia, 2015
- St. Michael's Cathedral, Block Master Plan, Toronto, Ontario, 2015
- Bay Adelaide East Tower and Podium, Toronto, Ontario, 2016
- Ponderosa Commons, University of British Columbia, Vancouver, British Columbia, (Phase 2), 2016
- Thornwood House, Toronto, Ontario, 2016
- The Globe and Mail Office Interiors and Corporate Event Space, Toronto, Ontario, 2017
- Global Centre for Pluralism, Ottawa, Ontario, 2017
- Remai Modern Art Gallery of Saskatchewan, Saskatoon, Saskatchewan, 2017
- Ottawa Art Gallery (OAG) Expansion and Arts Court Redevelopment, Ottawa, Ontario, 2018
- Wilson School of Design, Kwantlen Polytechnic University, Richmond, British Columbia, 2018
- Lloyd Hall, Banff Centre for Art and Creativity, Banff, Alberta, 2018
- Lawrence Hights, Toronto, Ontario, 2018
- 11 Wellesley, Toronto, Ontario, 2018
- Canada's Diversity Gardens at Assiniboine Park, Winnipeg, Manitoba, 2019
- University of Lethbridge Destination Project, Lethbridge, Alberta, 2019
- 11 Wellesley, Toronto, Ontario, 2019
- Bloor Street United Church: 300 Bloor West, Toronto, Ontario, 2020
- Massey Hall, Renovation and Expansion, Toronto, Ontario, 2020
- University of Toronto, Landscape of Landmark Quality, Toronto, Ontario, 2020
- Jack Layton Ferry Terminal and Harbour Square Park, Toronto, Ontario, Ongoing
- Saint Luke's United Church, Toronto, Ontario, ongoing

=== United States ===
- Ammirati Puris Lintas, New York City, 1997
- Goodman Theatre, Chicago, Illinois, 2000
- Sprague Memorial Hall, Yale University, New Haven, Connecticut, 2003
- Charles R. Walgreen Jr. Drama Center & Arthur Miller Theatre, Ann Arbor, Michigan, 2007
- The Study at Yale Hotel, New Haven, Connecticut, 2008
- SugarCube, Denver, Colorado, 2008
- Conrad Hotels, New York City, New York (state), 2012
- Orchestra Hall Renewal, Minnesota Orchestra, Minneapolis, Minnesota, 2013
- Adams Center for Musical Arts, Yale University, New Haven, Connecticut, 2015
- Julis Romo Rabinowitz Building & Louis A. Simpson International Building, Princeton University, Princeton, New Jersey, 2017
- Kellogg School of Management, Northwestern University, Evanston, Illinois, 2017
- Ronald O. Perelman Center for Political Science and Economics, University of Pennsylvania, Philadelphia, Pennsylvania, 2018

=== International ===
- Star Alliance Lounge, Zürich, Switzerland, 2001
- Canadian Embassy Berlin, Berlin, Germany, 2005

== See also ==
- Bruce Kuwabara
- Marianne McKenna
- Shirley Blumberg
