= Seagram Museum =

- The postmodern building by Barton Myers
- Established: 1984
- Dissolved: 1997
- Location: 57 Erb Street West, Waterloo, Ontario, Canada
- Type: Defunct corporate museum
- Website: Archives

The Seagram Museum was a museum in Waterloo, Ontario, Canada, preserving the heritage of the once venerable Canadian distillery Seagram. Located at 57 Erb Street West, the museum operated from May 1984 to March 1997. Designed by architect Barton Myers, it was built at a cost of $4.75 million and its entrance was a renovated late-19th century rack warehouse from the Seagram plant. Plans for the museum were announced in 1981. Peter Swann, a former director of the Royal Ontario Museum, was hired as the first director and oversaw the creation of the Seagram Museum. It had a variety of exhibits illustrating everyday life in the liquor distillery in the late 19th and early 20th century.

The company closed its Waterloo plant in 1992, and the museum continued to operate for another five years. It narrowly escaped a fire in 1993 that destroyed the building next to it.

The City of Waterloo purchased the Seagram property for $4 million in the fall of 1997. The museum donated its archives to the University of Waterloo. Two former barrelhouses on the site were converted into condominia while the museum became an office building, leased to software company Waterloo Maple. The company moved into the renovated building in June 1998.

In July 2002, the city sold the building to the Centre for International Governance Innovation (CIGI) for $2.5 million. In September 2003, Waterloo Maple left the building and CIGI moved in. In 2010 it also housed Project Ploughshares. E-commerce company Shopify moved into the building in 2016.

Some of the museum's collection was transferred to the City of Waterloo and is on display at the City of Waterloo Museum, which opened in 2009.

== Affiliations ==
The Museum was affiliated with: CMA, CHIN, and Virtual Museum of Canada.
