= Remai Modern =

- Art Gallery of Saskatchewan
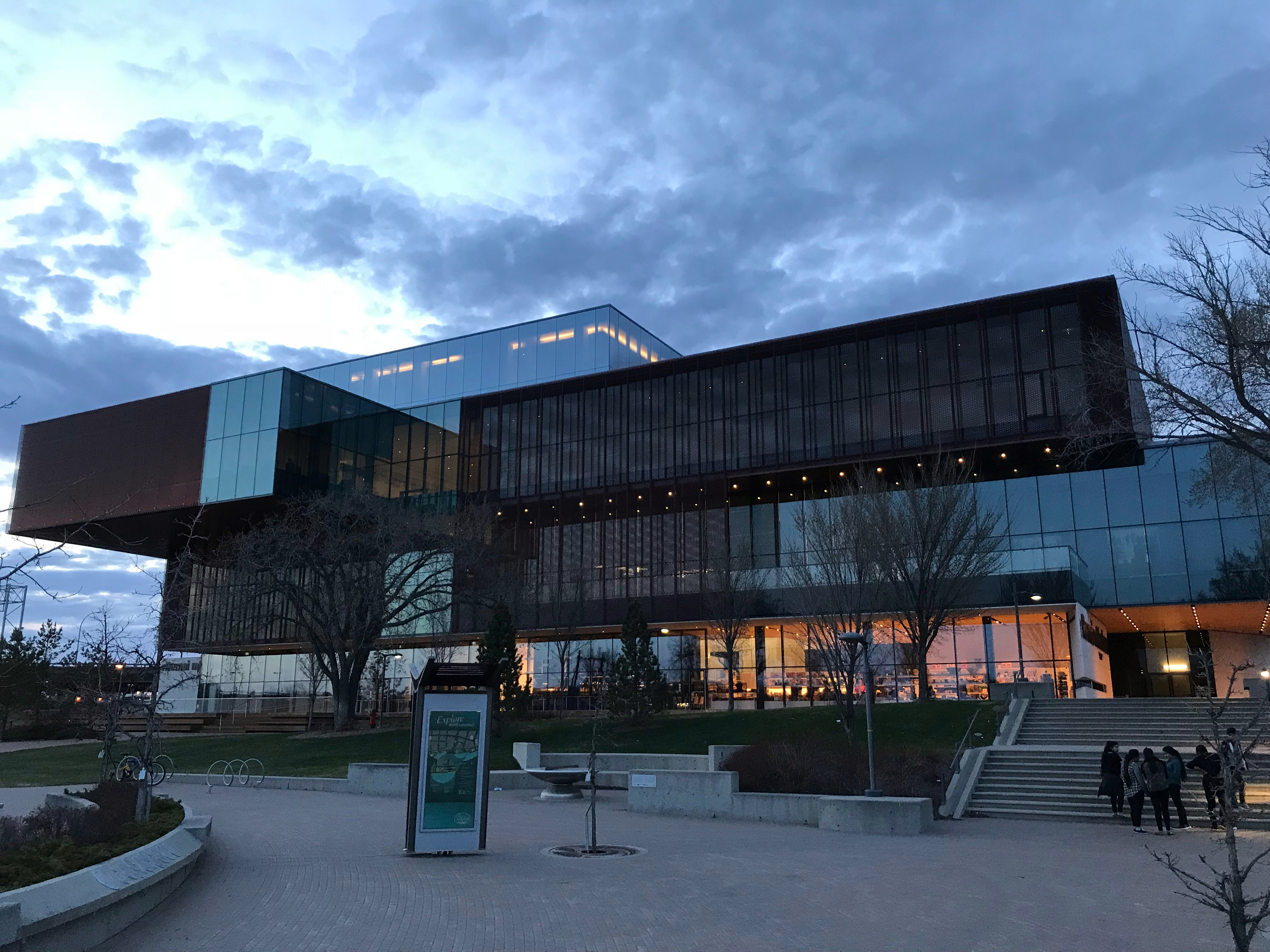
- Exterior of Remai Modern
- Established: 9 July 2009; 17 years ago (Note: The art museum was incorporated on 9 July 2009. However, the art museum did not formally open to the public until 21 October 2017.)
- Location: Saskatoon, Saskatchewan, Canada
- Coordinates: 52.1229°N 106.6674°W
- Type: Art museum
- Collection size: 8,000+ (Note: As of March 2020, the museum formally had only 547 works in its permanent collection, although it has over 8,000 works when including the Mendel Art Gallery Collection at Remai Modern. Plans are in place to formally integrate the Mendel collection into the Remai Modern's permanent collection. However, the Saskatoon Gallery and Conservatory Corporation formally maintains custodianship over the Mendel collection; with the formal transfer of the Mendel collection to the Remai Modern dependent on the art museum receiving certification from Heritage Canada.)
- Directors: Aileen Burns and Johan Lundh
- CEO: Aileen Burns and Johan Lundh
- Curator: Michelle Jacques (chief curator)
- Architect: Bruce Kuwabara
- Website: www.remaimodern.org

Remai Modern is a public art museum in Saskatoon, Saskatchewan, Canada. The art museum is situated along the west bank of the South Saskatchewan River, at the River Landing development in Saskatoon's Central Business District. The museum's 11,582 square metres (124,670 sq ft) building was designed by Bruce Kuwabara of KPMB Architects in association with Architecture49.

Plans to create a new art museum in Saskatoon emerged after plans to renovate the Mendel Art Gallery were abandoned in 2009. The new art museum was formally incorporated on 9 July 2009 as the Art Gallery of Saskatchewan. In 2016, the institution was rebranded as Remai Modern by the Saskatoon City Council; after Saskatoon-based entrepreneur and philanthropist Ellen Remai announced a donation of CA$30 million on behalf of the Frank and Ellen Remai Foundation to fund the construction and programming for the museum. Construction for the art museum took place from June 2013 to 2017, and was opened to the public in October 2017.

The museum's permanent collection features over 8,000 works from Canadian and international artists. Its collection includes the collection of the former Mendel Art Gallery; and a collection of more than 400 linocuts and ceramics by Pablo Picasso. In addition to exhibiting works from its collection, the museum organizes exhibitions and hosts a number of travelling exhibitions.

== History ==
Plans to develop a modern and contemporary art museum began in the late 2000s and early 2010s. These plans originated from expansion and moving plans of the former Mendel Art Gallery, which announced its intention to move to the River Landing development in April 2009. However, in November 2009, the city council of Saskatoon voted to establish a new art museum at the River Landing location. The art museum was formally incorporated on 9 July 2009 as the Art Gallery of Saskatchewan Inc. The new art museum is not considered a direct continuation of the Mendel Art Gallery, although it did inherit its permanent collection after its closure in June 2015. The assets of the Mendel Art Gallery were split between the City of Saskatoon government and the Art Gallery of Saskatchewan following the Mendel's closure.

In 2011, lead patron Ellen Remai donated $15 million toward construction costs of a new art museum, $15 million to support international exhibition programs, and also donated the most comprehensive collection of Picasso linocuts to the future art museum's permanent collection. As a result of the donation, the museum announced it was rebranding as the Remai Art Gallery of Saskatchewan.

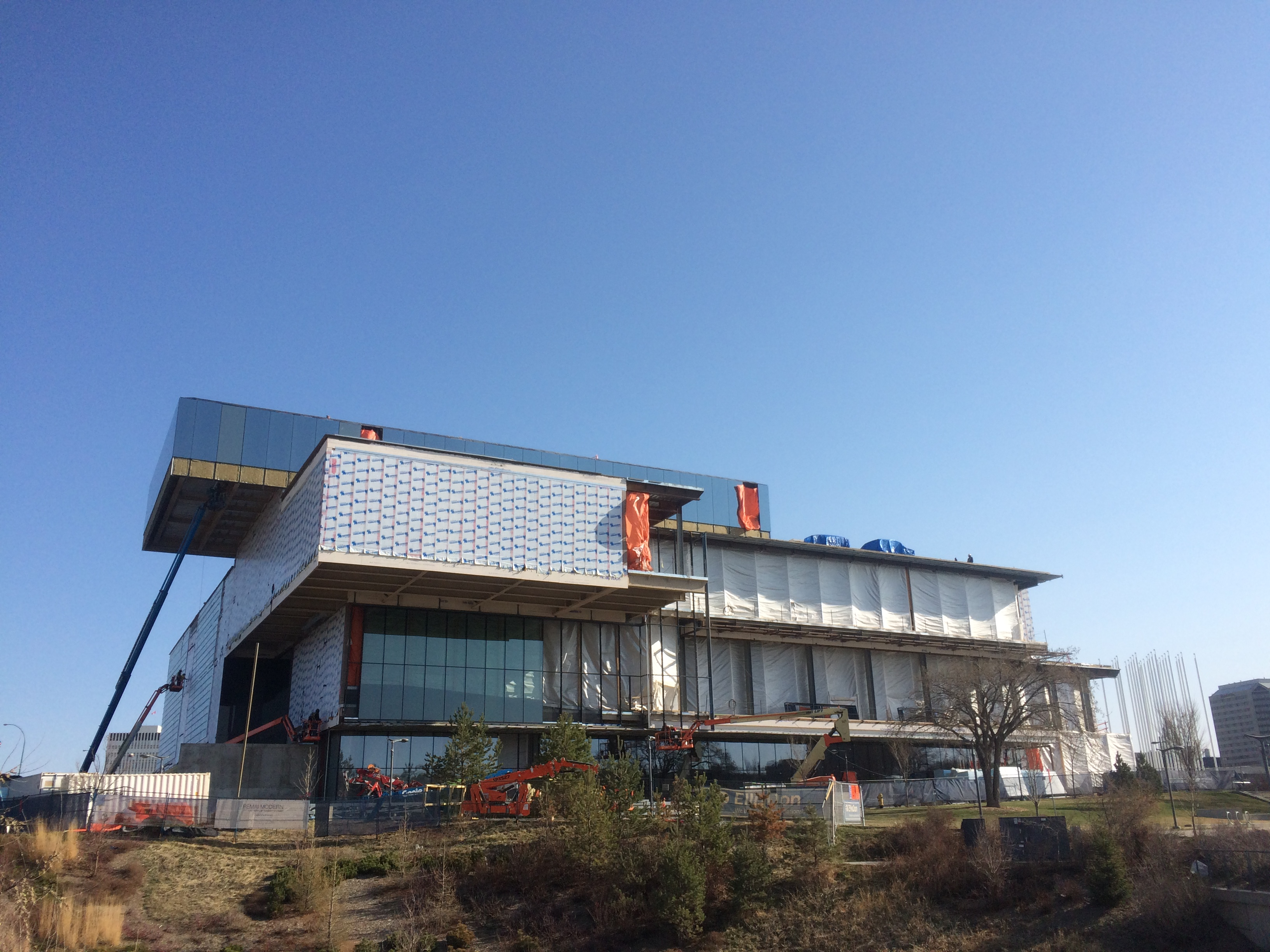
Work on the museum's building, April 2015

The inaugural director and CEO of the museum, Gregory Burke, was appointed in May 2013. Construction for the museum building began on 7 June 2013. Funding to build the museum building came from the federal, provincial, and municipal governments, as well as private donors. The federal government contributed $13,020,000; the provincial government contributed $16,744,000, and the municipal government contributed $30,287,000. The final budget approved to build the museum was $84,634,160, with the remaining $24,095,160 collected through fundraisers and private donors. (Note: The aforementioned approved budget was the museum building only, and does not include the cost of the parkade underneath the museum building. The parkade was built and maintained by the City of Saskatoon. The cost to build the parkade was an additional $19.5 million.) The museum was later rebranded as Remai Modern Art Gallery of Saskatchewan in April 2014. In doing so, it became the first art museum in Canada to brand themselves specifically for modern art.

During construction for the museum building, the museum's Board of Directors became the subject of controversy. In December 2015, local artists submitted a letter to the Remai Modern's board requesting the removal of board member, John Gormley. In the letter, the artists referred to a Twitter post made by Gormley suggesting violence against Muslims in the wake of the November 2015 Paris attacks. Gormley remained on the board while an independent third-party review was performed. In January 2016, the third-party review found Gormley was not in breach of the Remai Modern's code of conduct. On April 12, 2016 Gormley resigned from the Remai Modern board of directors.

In June 2016, the museum rebranded again as Remai Modern, with the museum's logo stylized as "rRemai mModern". Karlssonwilker was contracted by the museum for $90,000 to design the museum's logo, website, and other merchandise. Although the institution's rebranding saw "Art Gallery of Saskatchewan" omitted from its name, the museum remains formally incorporated as the Art Gallery of Saskatchewan Inc., under the province's Non-profit Corporations Act.

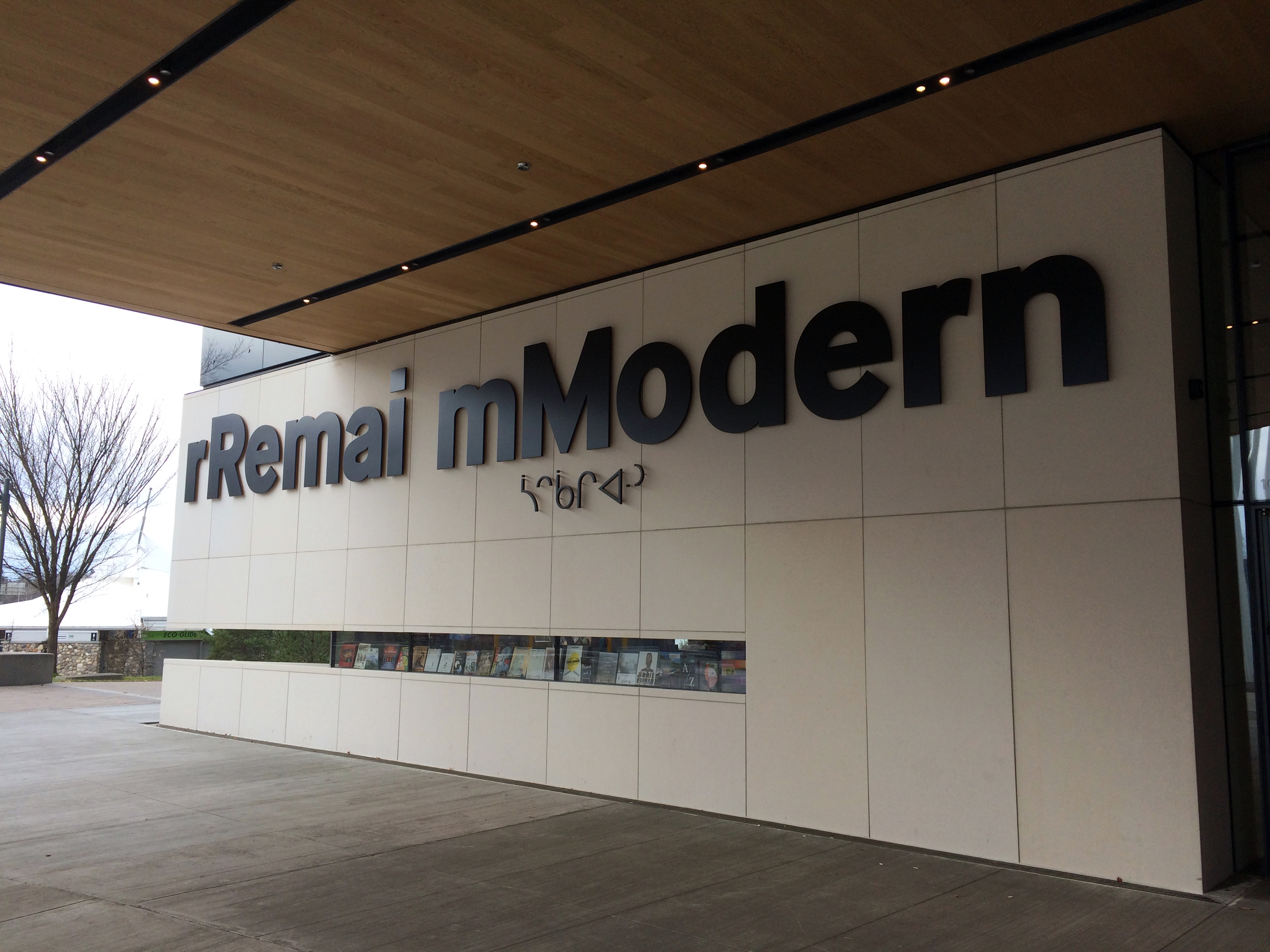
The museum's logo next to the main entrance in 2017. The stylized rRemai mModern logo was unveiled by the museum the previous year.

A civic ceremony to open the museum was held on 21 October 2017, which featured First Nations and Métis performances. On the same day, Remai Modern opened its first exhibition, Field Guide. The museum-spanning exhibition included select works from the museum's contemporary collection, as well as the 13 works donated by Fred Mendel that formed the basis of the Mendel Art Gallery, including works by Lawren Harris, Emily Carr and David Milne. Shortly after the museum opened, the City of Saskatoon was informed that construction for the museum building had exceeded the approved budget by $2.5-$4 million, due to delays relating to drawing corrections and clarifications.

== Architecture ==
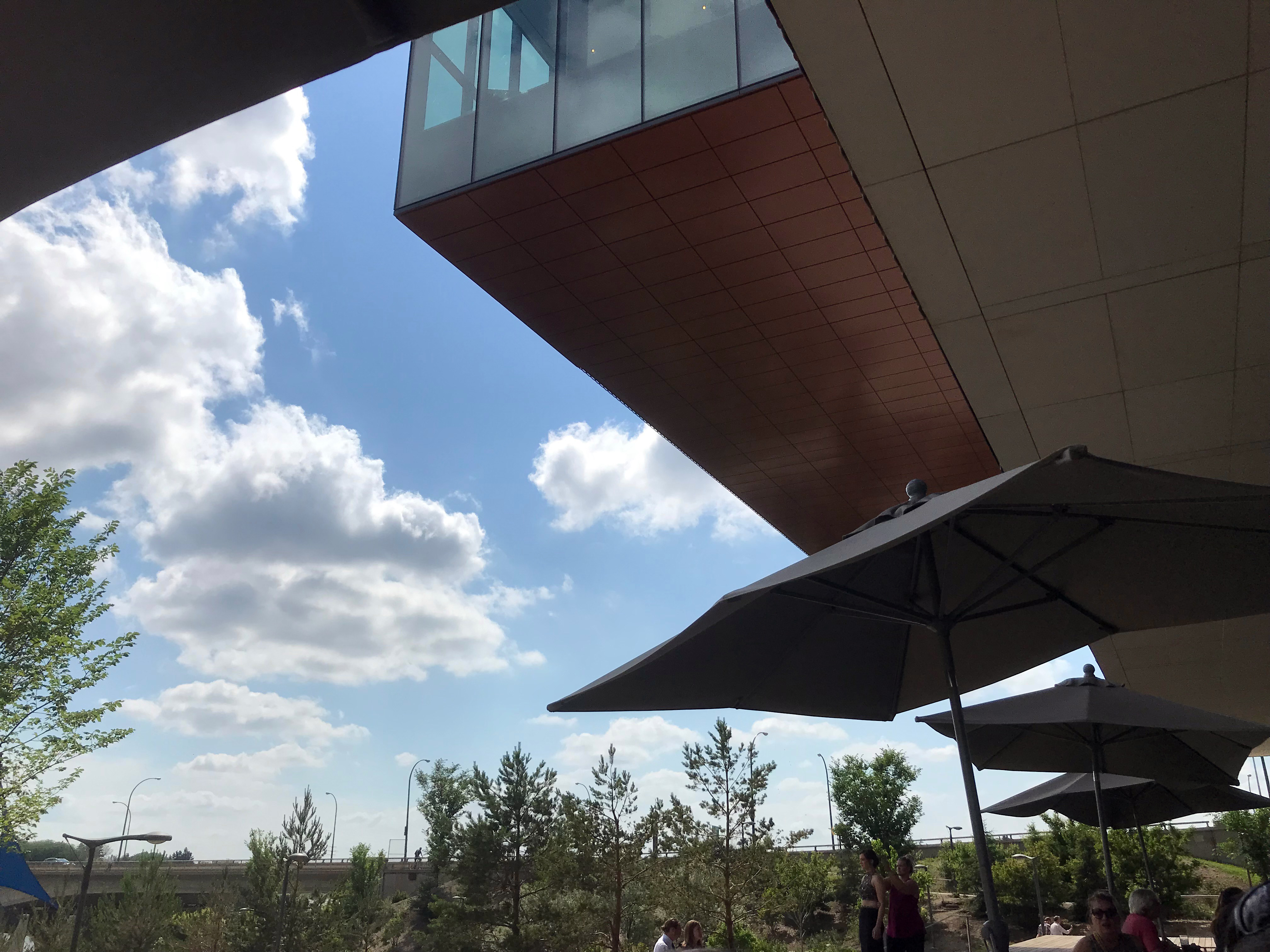
Underneath the cantilevered stacks of the museum building

The museum property is situated in River Landing, a development area of the Saskatoon's Central Business District, and is positioned in an area that overlooks a bend in the South Saskatchewan River. The design for the museum building was by Bruce Kuwabara of KPMB Architects, in association with architectural firm Architecture49. EllisDon was contracted to construct the museum building.

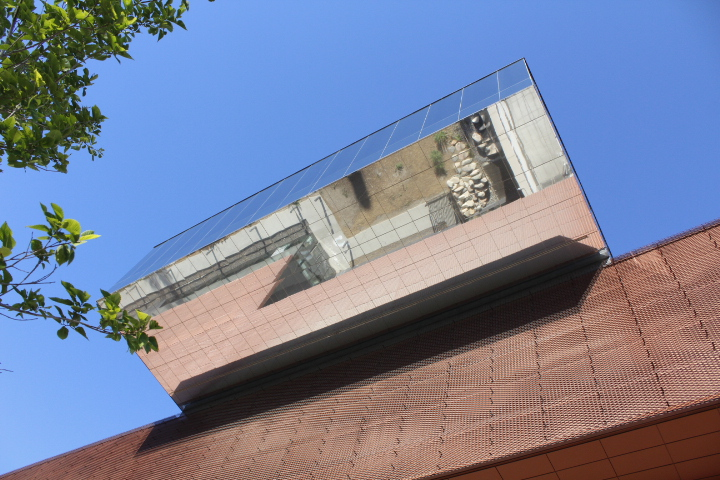
View of the building's copper mesh and glass-reflective surfaces.

The building's design is influenced by Frank Lloyd Wright's Prairie style. The design of the building's exterior was based on region's open prairie landscape, and the barns, field sheds, and silos that occupy that space. The exterior features cantilevered stacks that extend towards the South Saskatchewan River; and its glass and copper mesh exterior. The exterior steel mesh is a solar shading device and provides a shadowing effect on the building as the sun arcs through the sky. The design of the copper patina was inspired by the roof of the Delta Bessborough, a hotel located nearby along the South Saskatchewan River. The building takes up approximately 11,582 square metres (124,670 sq ft) of space, and is made up of approximately four floors, and an underground parkade. Approximately 1,100 metric tons (1,200 short tons) of steel was used for the construction of the building; most of which was supplied by the Walters Group.

The glass walls on the ground floor are intended to provide visitors with a sense of "transparency between the interior and the outdoors". The "openness" of the prairie landscape were also reflected in the interior design of the building, with the ceiling of the main atrium extending to the fourth level of the building, and its walls being made of glass and overlooking the South Saskatchewan River. The main atrium also features a communal fireplace. The building includes eleven galleries dedicated to exhibiting artworks. The building also includes an in-house cafe, community atrium, a restaurant, a retail store, two learning studios, a 150-seat theatre, rental spaces, a rooftop patio, and a lounge.

== Permanent collection ==
As of December 2020, Remai Modern had over 8,000 works in its permanent collection when including the works from the former Mendel Art Gallery. Acquisitions for the Remai Modern's permanent collection began in 2014, with modern and contemporary artworks being the primary focus of the museum's collecting efforts. The majority of the works in the museum's collection were acquired through donations, although the museum has also purchased works directly from the artist or vendor.

Artists whose works are featured in the Remai Modern's permanent collection includes Rebecca Belmore, Eli Bornstein, Georges Braque, Stan Douglas, Brian Jungen, Jimmie Durham and Haegue Yang.

=== Mendel collection ===
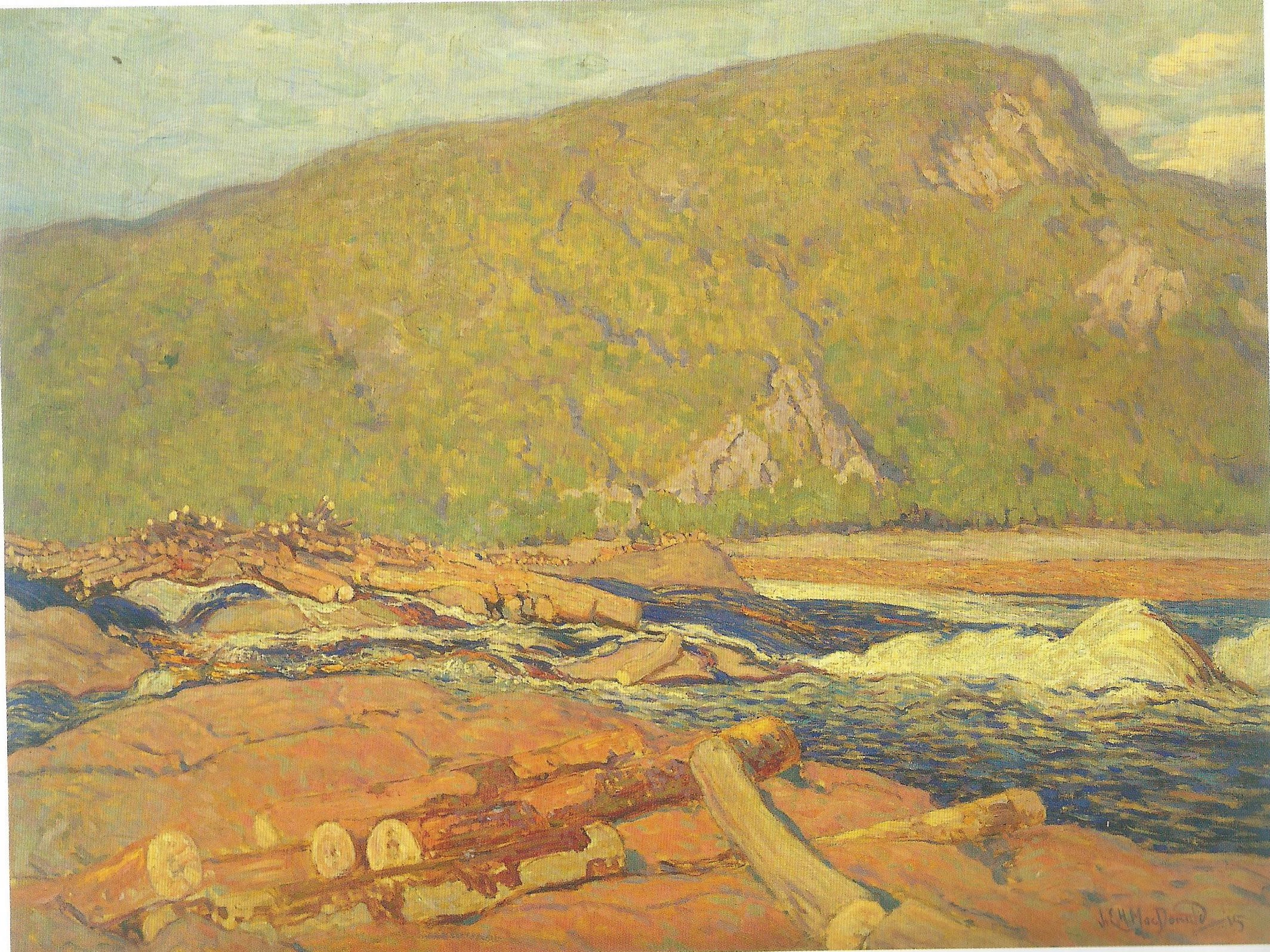
Logs on the Gatineau by J. E. H. MacDonald. The piece forms a part of the museum's Mendel collection.

The Mendel collection, now known as the Mendel Art Gallery Collection at Remai Modern, was the permanent collection of the former Mendel Art Gallery and was inherited by Remai Modern. The Mendel collection includes the historical works in Remai Modern's collection, with most of the works dating back to the early 20th century. The Mendel collection has 7,700 works by artists including Emily Carr, Lawren Harris, Cornelius Krieghoff, and murals by William Perehudoff.

Works from the Mendel collection have been exhibited at the museum since its opening in October 2017. As of March 2019, the Mendel collection formally remains in the possession of the Saskatoon Gallery and Conservatory Corporation, (Note: The Saskatoon Gallery and Conservatory Corporation is a City of Saskatoon-owned corporation, that operated the defunct Mendel Art Gallery and the Civic Conservatory (still in operation).) and will be transferred to the Remai Modern after it receives "Category A" status from Heritage Canada.

=== Picasso collection ===
An area of the museum's permanent collection is the Picasso collection, featuring ceramics and linocuts by Pablo Picasso. In 2012 Ellen Remai donated 405 Picasso linocuts to the museum. Valued at $20 million in 2012, the linocut collection is the world's largest collection of Picasso works in this medium, representing 194 out of 197 subjects known to exist. In addition to the linocuts, the collection features 23 Picasso ceramics, donated to the museum by Frederick Mulder in 2014. He also donated an additional linocut subject to the museum at that time.

== Programming ==
Remai Modern offers a variety of programming. In addition to the permanent collection and rotating exhibitions on display, the museum screens films, hosts talks, runs art programs for students and visitors, and offers offsite art programs. The museum also presents live performance art programs including dance, sound, music and other live media.

A variety of online programming can also be viewed on the museum's website and through their social media channels.

== See also ==
- List of art museums
- List of museums in Saskatchewan
