= Frederick Mulder =

Art dealer and philanthropist

Frederick Mulder CBE
- Born: Eston, Saskatchewan
- Education: B.A. in English; M.A. in Philosophy; PhD in Philosophy
- Alma mater: University of Saskatchewan; Brown University; Linacre College, Oxford
- Occupations: Art dealer; Philanthropist
- Organizations: Frederick Mulder Foundation; The Funding Network; Frederick Mulder Ltd.
- Website: Official website

Frederick Mulder CBE is a Canadian-British art dealer and philanthropist who resides in Totnes, Devon. He is the founder of the Frederick Mulder Foundation, The Funding Network, and Frederick Mulder Ltd.

== Early life and education ==
Frederick Mulder was born in Chatham, Ontario, Canada in 1943. His father was a soldier who was wounded in France during action in World War II and later died in a British hospital. His mother remarried when he was nine years old, and he grew up in Eston, Saskatchewan.

He later earned his bachelor's degree in English at the University of Saskatchewan, graduating in 1964. For graduate school, he attended Brown University, earning both a Master's degree and a PhD in Philosophy. For his doctorate, he worked under the supervision of a University of Oxford professor and wrote his dissertation at the English university in 1968. While studying at Oxford, Mulder purchased his first Picasso print, L'Ecuyere, for £18.

== Career ==
After earning his doctorate, Mulder became a private art dealer specializing in European printmaking between 1470 and 1970, and in 1972 went to work for the London art dealership, Colnaghi, owned at the time by Jacob Rothschild. In 1988, Mulder met Pablo Picasso's linocut printer, Hidalgo Arnera. Over the years, Mulder formed a professional relationship with Arnera and after Arnera's death in 2006, Mulder purchased some of his private collection and archives, including his archives of Picasso linocuts. He sold part of the linocut collection to Ellen Remai who then donated the collection to the Remai Modern Art Gallery in Saskatoon, Saskatchewan in 2012. Mulder later donated 23 ceramics created by Picasso to the gallery.

In 1986, Mulder founded the Frederick Mulder Charitable Trust (later renamed Frederick Mulder Foundation in 2014), a charitable trust that focuses on combating climate change and global poverty. The organization is funded largely by revenue from Frederick Mulder Ltd. In 2007, Mulder sold a 1935 Picasso etching, La Minotauromachie, at the New York Print Fair for a price in excess of $3 million. Seventy-five percent of that money went to the Frederick Mulder Foundation. Mulder also donated half of the $20 million earned from the 2012 sale of Picasso's linocut collection to his Foundation.

In 2002, Mulder co-founded The Funding Network, another charitable organization that holds live crowdfunding events for social change projects. He also helped launch international affiliates and the organization now has or is setting up affiliates in over 20 countries.

== Recognition and awards ==
In 2005, The Beacon Fellowship awarded Mulder with the Judges' Special Beacon Prize for his philanthropic work. In 2008, The Independent listed him among "Britain's leading philanthropists." He was made a Commander of the Order of the British Empire (CBE) by Queen Elizabeth II in 2012 for services to philanthropy. In 2017, he was awarded an Honorary Doctor of Laws by the University of Saskatchewan.
