= Montgomery Sisam Architects =

Canadian architectural firm

Practice information
- Firm type: Canadian Architectural Firm
- Founders: David Sisam, Terry Montgomery
- Founded: 1978
- Location: Toronto, Ontario, Canada

Significant works and honors
- Awards: Royal Architectural Institute of Canada: Architectural Firm Award (2011)

Website
- www.montgomerysisam.com

Montgomery Sisam Architects is a mid-sized Canadian architectural firm with a focus on long-term care, residential, education, healthcare, and justice sectors. The firm was recognized by the Royal Architectural Institute of Canada (RAIC) for accumulating a diverse team, with a staff of 40 members from 12 countries.

== History ==
The Toronto-based Canadian firm, Montgomery Sisam Architects was established in 1978.

== Influences and industrial impacts ==
=== Ronald McDonald House Toronto ===
This building was designed to create an atmosphere of comfort for families that had to live within the building as their sick children undergo long-term treatment at the Hospital for Sick Children nearby. In addition to the suites for residential purposes, the building facilitates a kitchen, dining room, living room, library, fitness room, administrative offices, and support spaces to accommodate the atmosphere of a 'home' for families. The government of Ontario partnered with Toronto's Ronald McDonald House to create a total investment of a one-time capital grant for $9 million concerning the expansion of the infrastructure to serve up to 80 families. The building was completed in 2011 and designed with part of the focus on spaces in-between, such as; the courtyard, gallery, patio, etc... When speaking in terms of healthcare, these non-clinical spaces can help with recovery and mental state depending on the way their intended purpose is designed to be used. The research analysis conducted before designing the Ronald McDonald House Toronto (RMHT) was based upon five main topics that were defined by Cresswell(1998), biography, phenomenology, grounded theory, ethnography, and case studies. A case study showed that some families, particularly children, felt a sense of fear and isolation from the outside world due to their treatments and illnesses, such as hair loss due to chemotherapy. Thus to create an environment of inclusion, the courtyard was designed for creating a comfortable environment where children can talk to one another while providing a feeling of biophilia.

=== Bob Rumball Centre of Excellence for the Deaf ===
In 2011 Toronto Public Health issued a document called Healthy Toronto by Design, which was to address the problems of health care design in an urban city. The article stated the definition of a healthy city was a place with diverse culture, education, health care, food, housing, public transit, recreation, built and natural environments. Going along the lines of diversity, Montgomery Sisam looked upon projects involving a minority of the elderly care. Completed in 2006, the 49,250 square feet long-term care facility, situated in Barrie, ON, was designed to home and service the hearing-impaired elderly. Recognizing the client the building was meant to aid, the community centre focuses on the material, finishes, fixtures, signage, and lighting as its core objectives. The building is oriented in areas that optimize solar gains throughout all seasons. There are ribbon windows placed at altering elevations on the walls located in various directions of the cardinal directions. It is situated in an urban setting in Barrie, Ontario, Canada, where there is the ease of access to numerous amenities. Located right next to a plethora of vegetation and multiple courtyards with open space to accommodate their sight senses. The long-term care centre was designed to create an atmosphere of comfort by forming the building in the shape of traditional chalets and cottages built entirely of wood in the Lake Simcoe area of Toronto.

== Notable projects ==
=== Education ===
- Ontario Tech University Shawenjigewining Hall, completed in 2021
- Maple Grove Elementary School, completed in 2020 with the collaboration of SHAPE Architecture.
- Seneca College Magna Hall, completed in 2018. It was designed to create an urban atmosphere in a rural context.
- University of Toronto Myhal Centre for Engineering Innovation and Entrepreneurship, completed in 2018 with the collaboration of Feilden Clegg Bradley Studios
- Rotherglen School, completed in 2018. The building was an adaptive reuse project, in which the firm was to redevelop the existing building.
- Queen's University Mitchell Hall Innovation and Wellness Centre, completed in 2018 in collaboration with CS&P.
- Martin Luther University College, completed in 2018

=== Healthcare ===
- Centre for Addiction and Mental Health Phase 1C, completed in 2020
- Ron Joyce Children's Health Centre, completed in 2016 with a joint venture of Perkins+Will and Stantec
- Mount Sinai Centre for Fertility and Reproductive Health, completed in 2009.
- Sister Margaret Smith Addictions Treatment Centre was completed in 2009 with the collaboration of FORM Architecture Engineering
- Holland Bloorview Kids Rehab Hospital was completed in 2007 with the collaboration of Stantec Architecture

=== Long-term care ===
- George Street Revitalization is an ongoing project in collaboration with Hilditch Architect. It's a heritage site that is being redeveloped for a men's shelter as community-based care.
- Corner Brook Long Term Care, completed in 2019
- Centre for Excellence in Integrated Seniors Services, completed in 2016 with the collaboration of Form Architecture
- Kipling Acres Long Term Care, completed in 2015 with silver certification by LEED
- Alderwood Rest Home, completed in 2010 with the collaboration of WHW Architects (now Architecture 49)
- Norview Lodge, completed in 2005

=== Housing and senior living ===
- Durham Modular Supportive Housing is an ongoing project that is focusing on affordable and sustainable residences.
- Modular Supportive Housing: Phase 1, completed in 2020. This project was initiated by the city of Toronto to address the issues of the overburdened shelter system caused by the COVID-19 pandemic and physical distancing requirements.
- The Annex Student Residence, completed in 2018 with the association of Barry J. Hobin & Associates
- 45 Mann Avenue Student Residence, completed in 2016
- Greenway Retirement Home, completed in 2009

=== Civic ===
- Fredericton Justice Building is an ongoing project in collaboration with Goguen Architecture
- Indian River Festival Pavilion, completed in 2015 in association with BGHJ Architects
- Tommy Thompson Park, completed in 2013
- Quinte Consolidated Courthouse was completed in 2013 with the collaboration of Kleinfeldt Mychajlowycz and WZMH
- Fort York Bridge, completed in 2010
- Toronto Botanical Gardens, additional programming completed in 2005

=== Recreation ===
- The Granite Club Shiftingravity, the additional programming was completed in 2015 with LEED Gold Certification.
- Island Yacht Club, completed in 2006

=== Work place ===
- Credit Valley Conservation Authority Head Office, completed in 2011. The LEED gold-certified project was developed to become a community-based environmental organization that would help in the restoration, development, conservation, and management of natural resources.
- TRCA Restoration Services Centre, completed in 2007
- Bird Studies Canada Headquarters, completed in 2002

== Awards ==
- Governor General's Award
- Canadian Architect Award of Excellence (8)
- Ontario Association of Architects Awards of Excellence (6)
- International Academy of Design and Health Awards (2)
- International Waterfront Centre Award
- Impact on Learning Award – received from the Council of Education Facility Planners International.

=== Toronto Botanical Gardens ===
==== Awards ====
- City of Toronto Environmental Award: Award of Excellence
- City of Toronto – Green Toronto Award: Green Design
- Design Exchange Award – Landscape Architecture: Award of Excellence
- The Landscape Ontario Water Conservation Award: Award of Excellence
- OAA: Award of Excellence

=== Holland Bloorview Kids Rehabilitation Hospital ===
==== Awards ====
- Association of Registered Interior Designers of Ontario: Award of Merit
- International Academy for Design and Health: Healthcare Design Project Academy Award
- Outside the Box Awards – Building Magazine: Architecturally Innovative Design
- OAA: Award of Excellence
- 2009 IES Illumination Awards: Interior & Exterior
- Toronto Urban Design Award: Honorable Mention
