= TIFF Lightbox =

Cultural centre in Toronto

Coordinates: 43.6465921°N 79.3903539°W

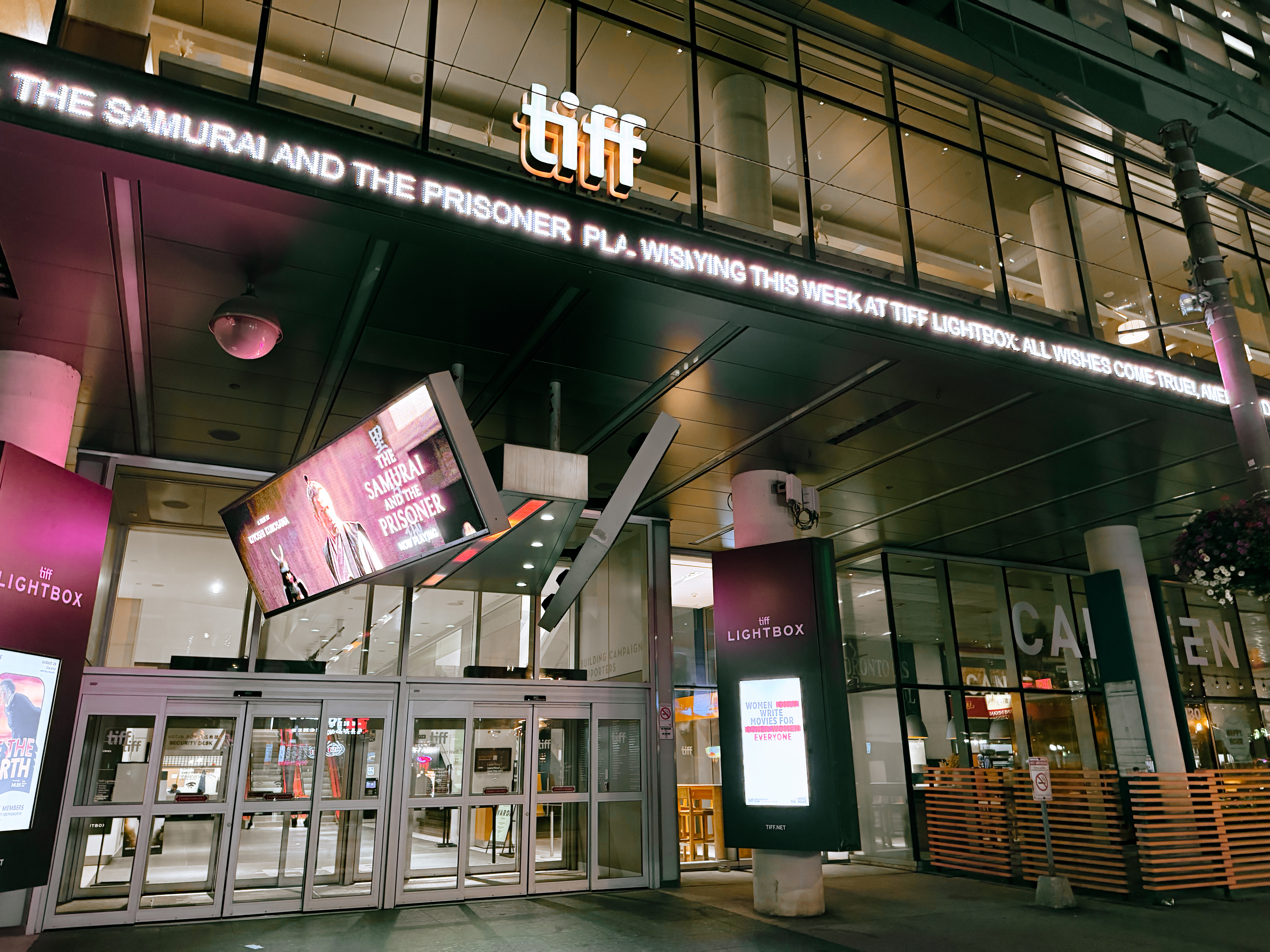
- Exterior of TIFF Lightbox from King Street, seen in August 2026

- Location within Toronto
- Established: 2009
- Location: 350 King Street West; Toronto, Ontario; M5V 3X5
- Public transit access: 503 504; 508 511; St. Andrew station
- Website: tiff.net

TIFF Lightbox is a cultural centre in Toronto, Ontario, Canada, located on the first five floors of the Lightbox and Festival Tower on the northwest corner of King Street and John Street.

TIFF Lightbox features five cinemas, two restaurants, major exhibitions and galleries, a gift shop, a rooftop terrace, and learning studios. It is the headquarters for the Toronto International Film Festival and serves as a venue for other film screenings and smaller specialty film festivals throughout the year.

The venue was previously known as the TIFF Bell Lightbox until its corporate sponsorship by Bell Canada was discontinued in 2023.

== History ==
TIFF Lightbox opened in 2010 on land donated by Ivan Reitman and family. The venue replaced the Art Gallery of Ontario's Jackman Hall as the primary screening venue of Cinematheque Ontario.

During construction, crews found artifacts belonging to York General Hospital, located on the site in 1829. TIFF Lightbox opened as a cinema complex, and included the Toronto International Film Festival offices, a ground-floor restaurant and a rooftop terrace are housed in a five-storey structure on King. TIFF Lightbox is built as a part of a five-storey structure that forms a part of the base of Festival Tower.

During the COVID-19 pandemic in Toronto, TIFF launched the Digital TIFF Lightbox, a streaming platform which served both as the primary venue for the online 2020 Toronto International Film Festival and as a rental store for Lightbox-style film programming both before and after the festival.

In November 2022, TIFF announced that Cinema 1, the largest screening room at the Lightbox, would be renamed the Viola Desmond Theatre in 2023.

== Facility ==
Festival Tower
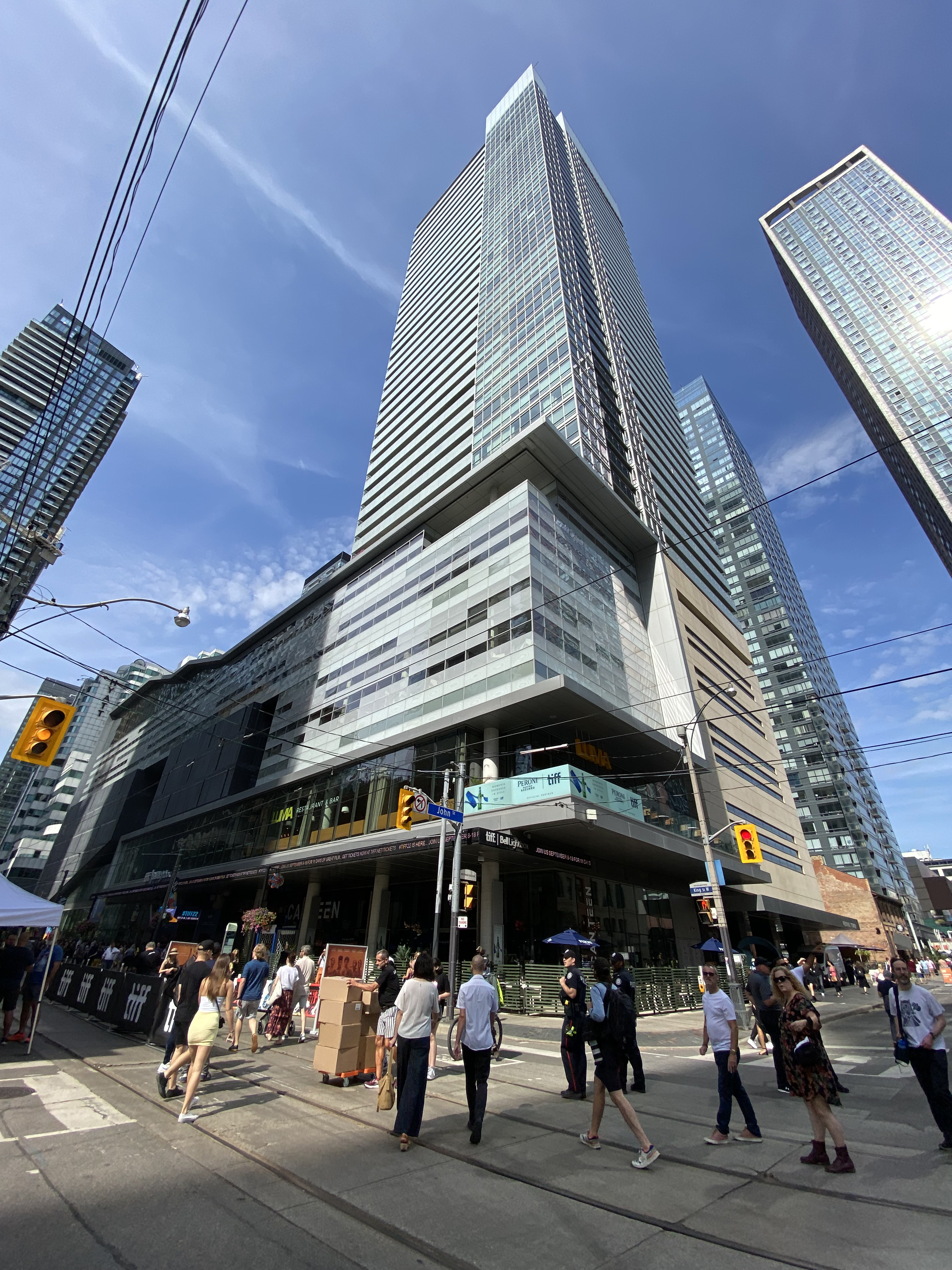
- Interactive map of the Festival Tower area

General information
- Type: Theatre, Residential, Retail
- Location: Corner of King Street & John Street; Toronto, Ontario
- Completed: September 12, 2010

Height
- Antenna spire: 157 m (515 ft)
- Roof: 152 m (499 ft)

Technical details
- Floor count: 46

Design and construction
- Architect: Bruce Kuwabara of KPMB Architects
- Developer: Toronto International Film Festival Group; Daniels Corporation & the Reitman Family
- Main contractor: PCL Constructors Canada

TIFF Lightbox is held in the podium, a five-storey complex that forms the base of the Lightbox and Festival Tower. The entrance for the structure's 46-storey tower of condominiums is on John Street, set back from the much smaller 19th-century buildings along King Street.

=== Podium ===
As the new headquarters for the Toronto International Film Festival, it contains five cinemas of various sizes, a three-storey public atrium, two galleries, three learning studios, a centre for students and scholars, a bistro, a restaurant, a lounge, a gift shop, and a rooftop terrace. The five-screen cinema complex also includes a film reference library, galleries and workshops.

The theatres present specially curated programming, as well as some new releases. Some of the films presented tie-in with exhibitions and retrospectives of actors or filmmakers. The extensive reference library and archives of film, which are open to the public, include publications and archival movies, as well as research and study space. The podium has been used by the Toronto International Film Festival since 2010. Other events staged at the Lightbox include the Inside Out Film and Video Festival, TIFF Next Wave and the imagineNATIVE Film + Media Arts Festival.

Since 2010, TIFF Lightbox has been the festival's home, marking its permanent move from Yorkville to King West. Future plans include a "Cinema Tower" on the block's north side, which will contain five additional theatres. The area also includes other prominent venues for the festival, such as Roy Thomson Hall and the Scotiabank Theatre.

The complex opened officially on September 12, 2010, with a block party. Bruce McDonald's Trigger was the first film screened at the theatre.

==== Gallery ====
The galleries host exhibitions related to film and art history. The fourth-floor gallery is free to the public, while the larger main gallery on the first level hosts large paid exhibitions. The first exhibition was the MoMA's monograph on Tim Burton, subsequent exhibits have included retrospectives of Federico Fellini, Grace Kelly, James Bond, David Cronenberg, Stanley Kubrick, and most recently, Andy Warhol.

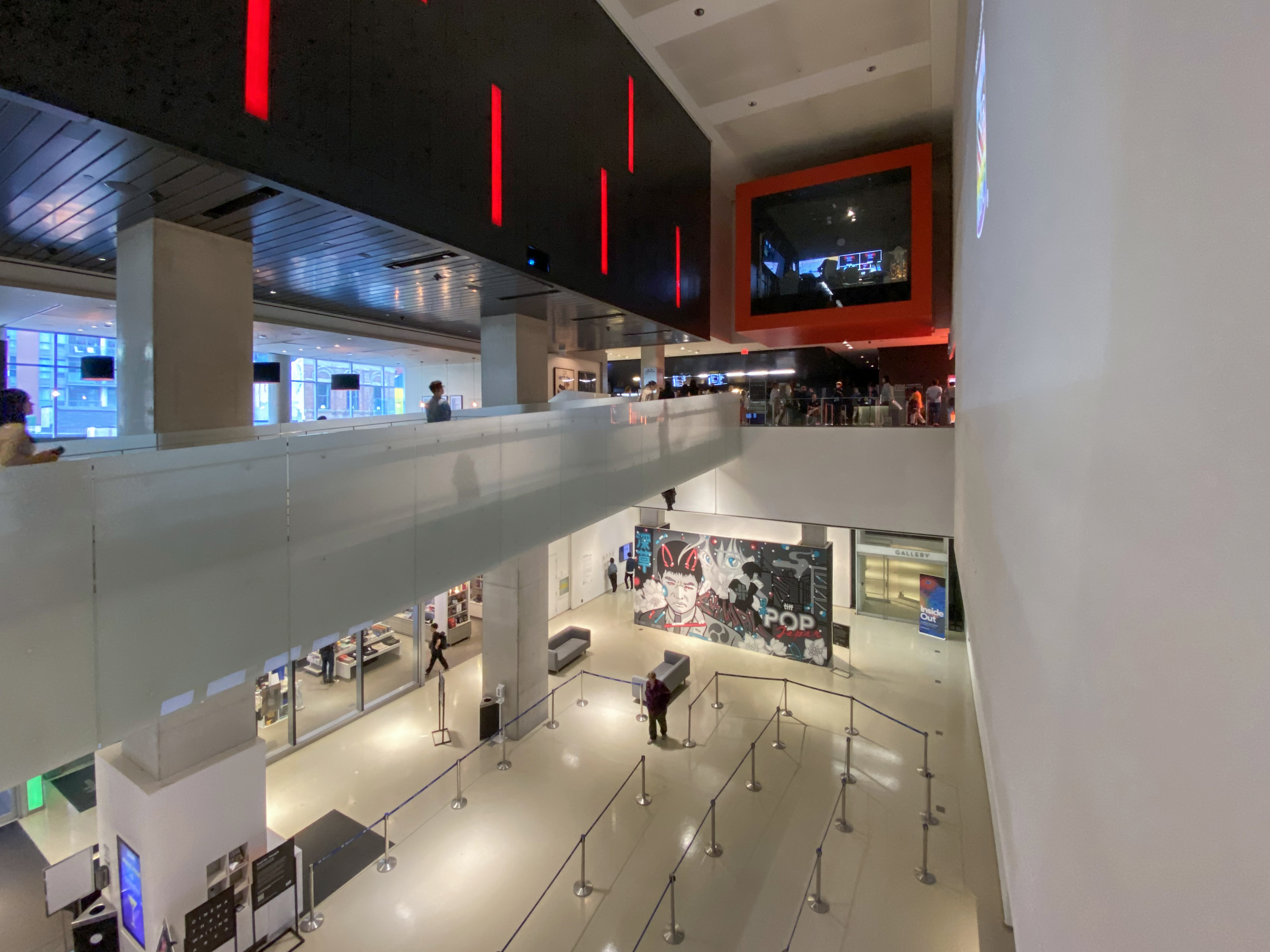
TIFF Lightbox Lobby

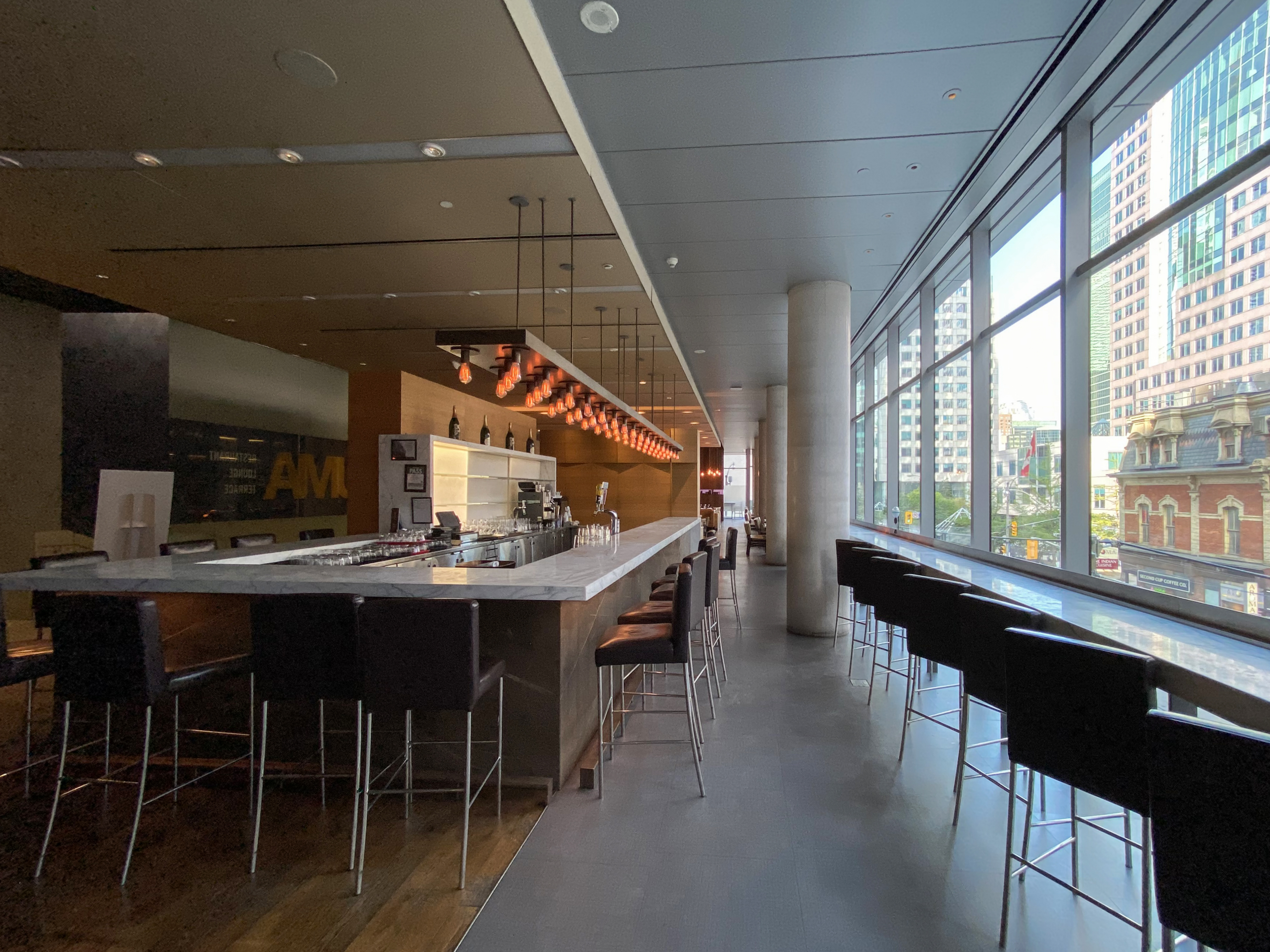
TIFF Lightbox Lounge

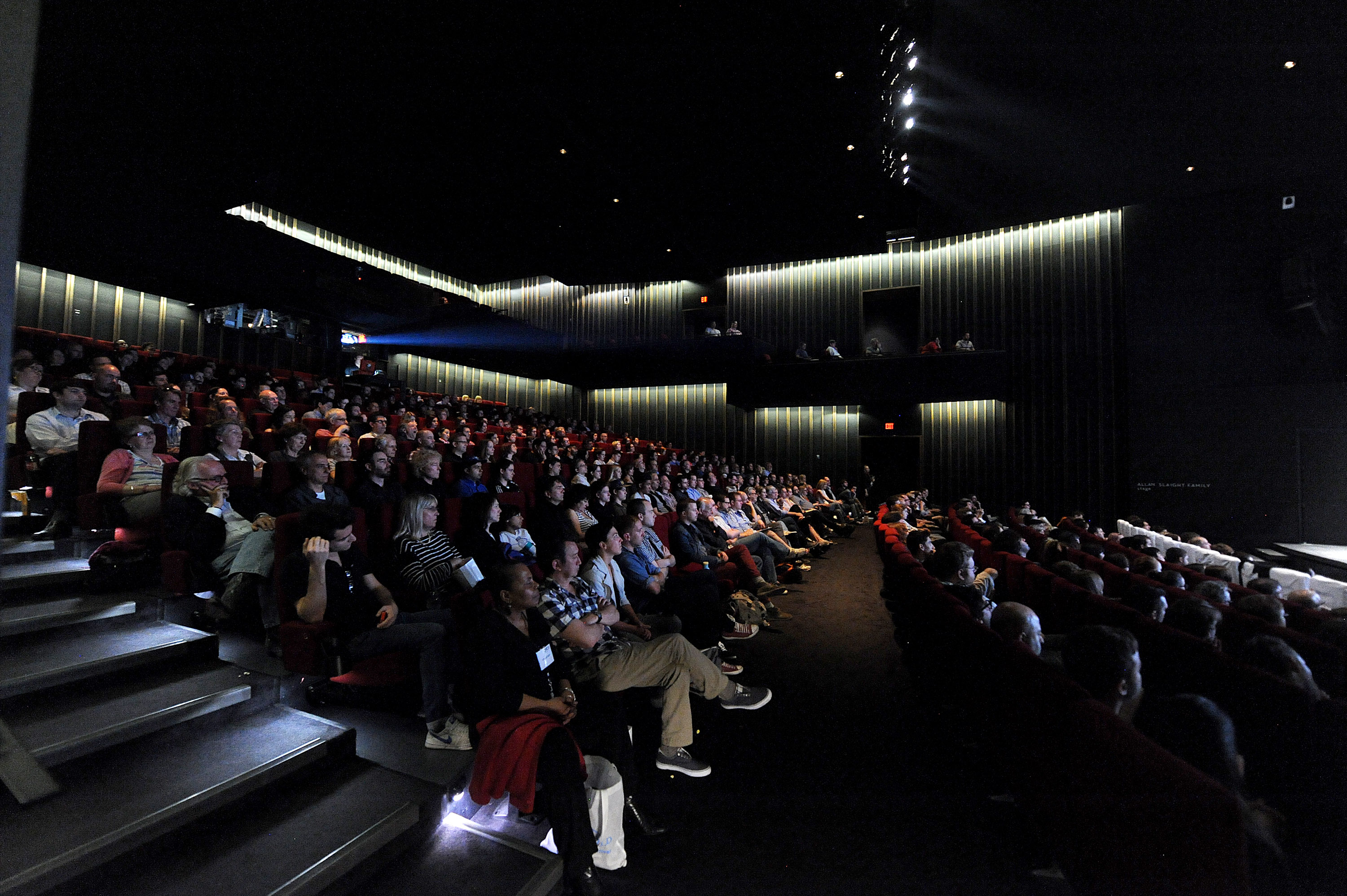
Theatre inside

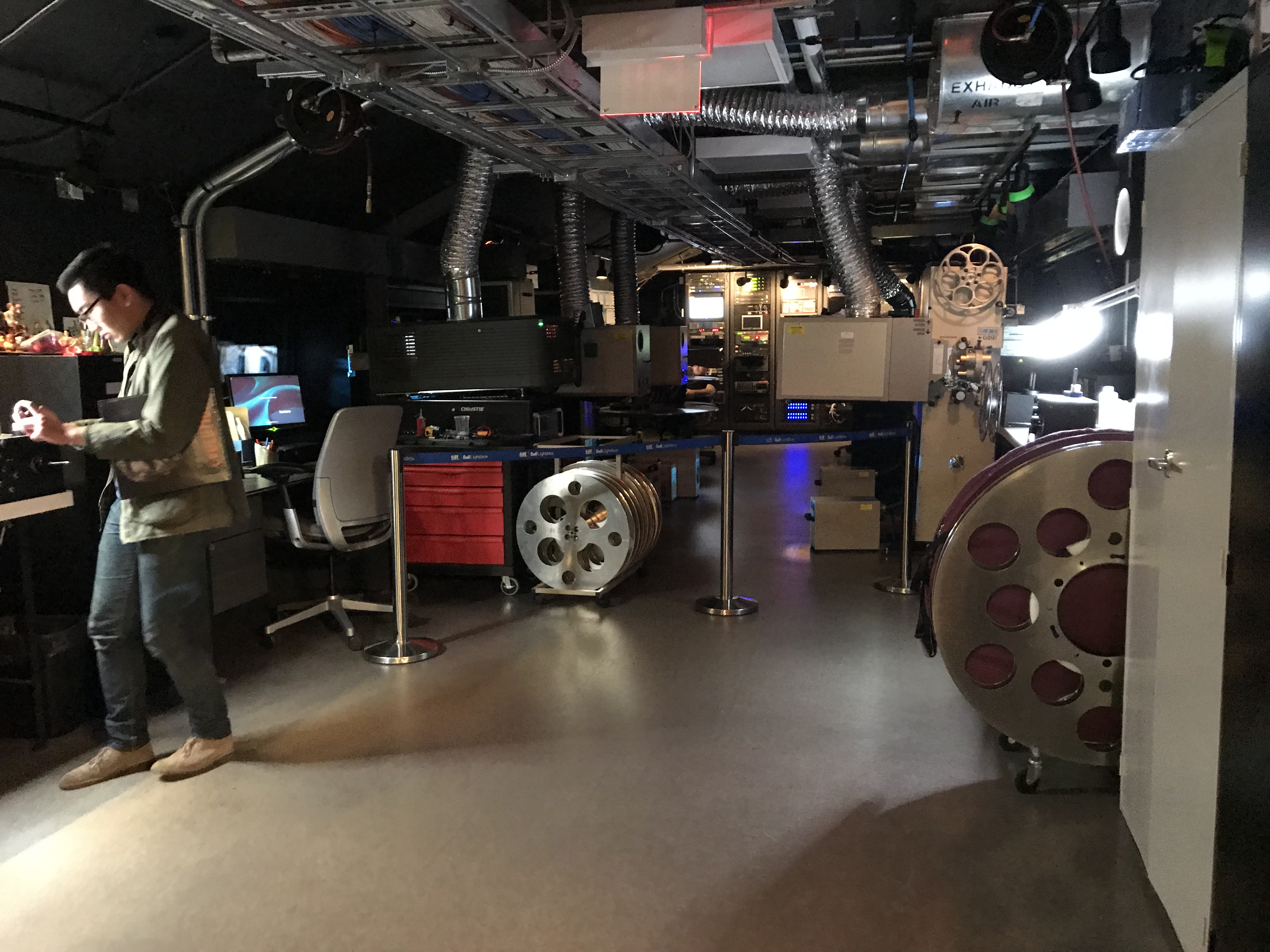
TIFF Lightbox projectionist booth

=== Festival Tower ===
Festival Tower was developed by The Daniels Corporation and designed by Toronto-based architectural firm Kuwabara Payne McKenna Blumberg Architects (KPMB) and Kirkor Architects. TIFF Lightbox is the home of the Toronto International Film Festival (TIFF), while Festival Tower contains condominium residences. The project was conceived in partnership by the Toronto International Film Festival Group and the King and John Festival Corporation.

== Financial support ==
TIFF is a not-for-profit organization with an annual economic impact of $189 million CAD. TIFF Lightbox is supported by contributors including major sponsors Royal Bank of Canada and Visa, the Province of Ontario, the Government of Canada, the City of Toronto, the Reitman family (Ivan Reitman, Agi Mandel and Susan Michaels) and The Daniels Corporation.

== See also ==
- List of tallest buildings in Toronto
- List of tallest buildings in Canada
- VIFF Centre (formerly the Vancouver International Film Centre)
