= Gluskin Sheff =

Canadian independent wealth management firm

Gluskin Sheff + Associates Inc.
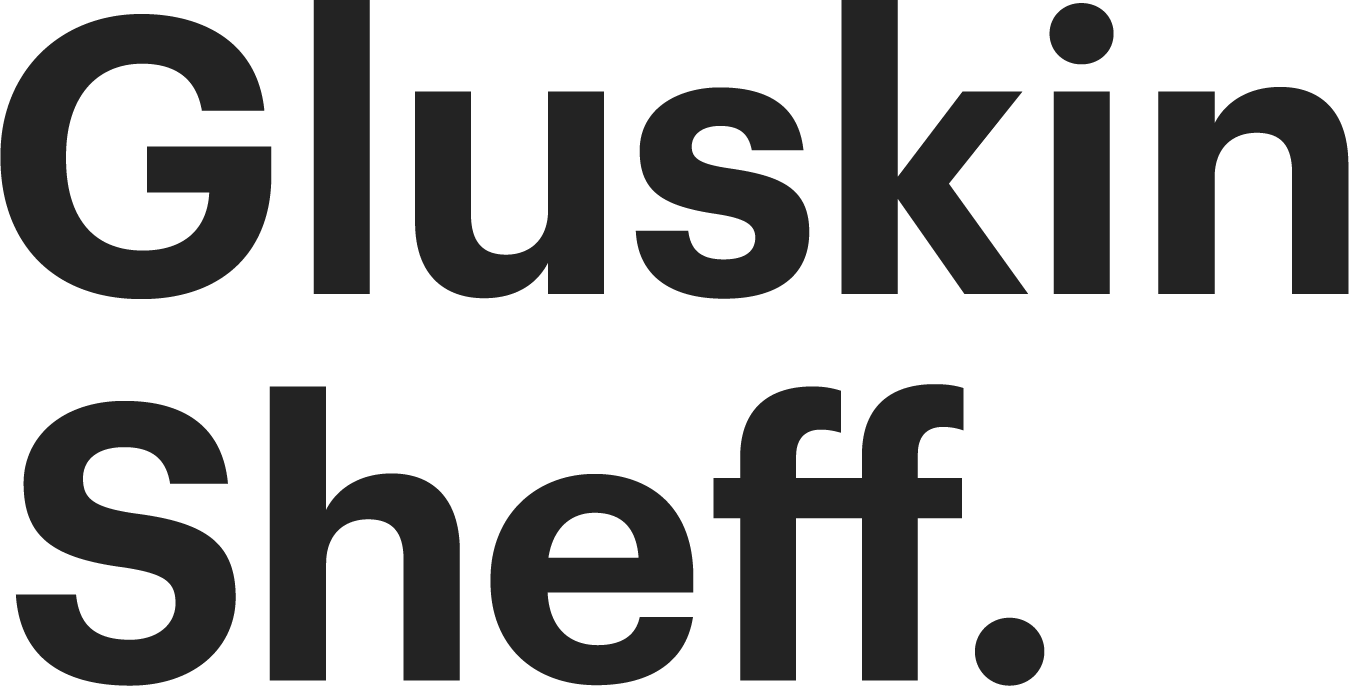
- Industry: Investment Companies
- Founded: 1984
- Founder: Gerald Sheff and Ira Gluskin
- Headquarters: Toronto, Ontario, Canada
- Parent: Onex Corporation
- Website: www.gluskinsheff.com

Gluskin Sheff + Associates Inc. is a Canadian independent wealth management firm that manages investment portfolios for investors, including entrepreneurs, professionals, family trusts, private charitable foundations and estates.

== History ==
The company was founded in 1984 by Ira Gluskin and Gerald Sheff. The company went public in 2006, listing on the Toronto Stock Exchange (TSX) under the symbol "GS". It was subsequently purchased and privatized by Onex Corporation for $445 million in March 2019.

In March 2023, Onex announced that Gluskin Sheff would be transferred to RBC Wealth management, as it winds down its wealth management operations.
