= Barton Myers =

American architect (1934–2026)

- Born: November 6, 1934; Norfolk, Virginia, U.S.
- Died: August 11, 2026 (aged 91); Connecticut, U.S.
- Education: University of Pennsylvania School of Design; Barton Myers Associates
- Occupation: Architect
- Practice: Diamond and Myers; Barton Myers Associates

Barton Myers RCA (November 6, 1934 – August 11, 2026) was an American architect and president of Barton Myers Associates Inc. in Santa Barbara, California. With a career spanning more than 40 years, Myers was a fellow of the American Institute of Architects and was a member of the Ontario Association of Architects while working in Canada earlier in his career.

== Early life ==
Born in Norfolk, Virginia, Myers was a descendant of Moses Myers, a businessman who was the first permanent Jewish settler in Norfolk, Virginia. The Federal style townhouse, which he built in Norfolk, later became and is now the Moses Myers House/Chrysler Museum of Art, and Myers has served as an Advisory Committee Board Member to the museum since 1999.

His grandfather (also named Barton Myers, 1853–1927) was a former Mayor of Norfolk, Virginia, and served on the board of the Jamestown Exposition in 1907. In 2007, the Chrysler Museum of Art mounted an exhibition about his significant contributions to Norfolk, Virginia at the Moses Myers House.

Myers graduated from the United States Naval Academy at Annapolis, Maryland, and served as a jet fighter pilot for five years in the United States Air Force, based first in the western United States and then (for three years) in the United Kingdom. He attended architecture courses at Oxford and at Cambridge University, and returned to the United States to study architecture. He received his Master of Architecture degree from the University of Pennsylvania and subsequently worked with Louis Kahn from 1964 to 1966.

== Architectural practice ==
Myers established his own practice in Toronto in 1968, and was principal in the firm of Diamond and Myers until 1975, when he formed Barton Myers Associates in Toronto. In 1984, he opened an office in Westwood, Los Angeles, which is now the firm's base.

In 1986, Myers was the recipient of the first Toronto Arts Award for Architecture in recognition of his contribution to the city and, in 1994, he received the Royal Architectural Institute of Canada Gold Medal. In 2002, he was awarded the American Institute of Architects, Los Angeles Chapter Gold Medal. He was also a member of the Royal Canadian Academy of Arts (RCA), "one of Canada's most enduring cultural institutions." Founded in 1880, the RCA celebrates the exceptional achievements of professionals working in Canada in multiple disciplines and under the patronage of the Governor General of Canada.

He taught architecture and planning at both the University of Toronto and the University of Waterloo. He has also served as the Thomas Jefferson Professor at the University of Virginia, the Graham Professor at the University of Pennsylvania and has been a visiting professor at the Harvard Graduate School of Design. He has held a continuing appointment as Professor of Architecture at the University of California, Los Angeles School of Architecture and Urban Design since 1980.

In 1994, Barton Myers' architectural body of work was published as part of the "Masters of Architecture" book series. Mainly in colour, the Myers monograph contains 52 projects illustrated with over 350 photographs. Other volumes in this series include: Norman Foster, Cesar Pelli, Murphy/Jahn, Peter Eisenman, Terry Farrell, Arup, Kisho Kurokawa and Skidmore, Owings & Merrill.

== Design themes ==
One of the themes running through Myers' work is the theme of urban consolidation. The infill projects he completed in Toronto (Dundas Sherbourne Housing and Hydro Block Housing) served as prototypes for an even distribution of urban density seen in Europe and earlier in his hometown of Norfolk, opposing the increasing trend of dense, high-rise city centers surrounded by urban sprawl, exemplified by cities like Dallas. His philosophy of urban renewal was published in "Vacant Lottery", with University of Toronto professor George Baird. It led to a renewed interest in city planning and offered a strategy for increasing population densities within cities while preserving the existing residential fabric.

Another architectural theme that Myers helped reintroduce to North American architecture is the idea of the urban room. Myers believes that the success of a building lies in its ability to define the surrounding streets, squares, forecourts and courtyards that make cities livable. This idea is evidenced in many of Myers' designs, including the Phoenix Municipal Government Center, Woodsworth College, New Jersey Performing Arts Center, and the Art Gallery of Ontario Stage III Expansion.

Myers' work often makes use of off-the-shelf components, or ready-made industrial products that can be readily assembled on site. His early studies with steel and aluminum products with companies such as DOFASCO and Steclo resulted in prototypes for mass-produced housing. The factory produced steel houses built in Hamilton, Ontario, by DOFASCO (1971) are still standing and in good condition. Myers continued this exploration of off-the-shelf components with the Wolf House, Toronto, (1974) and commercial projects such as the Alcan office headquarters in Toronto. This exploration has been constant throughout his career and can be seen in projects ranging from single family residential to large civic developments. As of 2007, four of Myers' steel house projects have been built and continue to be recognized by architectural peers for their innovation. In 2006, Barton Myers wrote a book "3 Steel Houses" which chronicles his explorations of steel house design throughout his career and its historical context.

His work is also identifiable by his commitment to adaptive reuse and his approach to old/new architectural combinations. His sensitivity to the existing urban fabric supports the idea that additions should openly relate to the existing structure and context rather than mimic architectural style. The Myers residence (1971) became an architectural example for modernist infill housing relating to the historic Victorian neighborhood. Later in his career, Myers' work in adaptive reuse was honored by the California Preservation Foundation in 2002 for a modern steel and glass addition to the Sacramento Hall of Justice, an example of early Beaux-Arts Classicism in Sacramento.

In 2007, the design of Myers' House in West Los Angeles was honored with the highest level of award by the American Institute of Architects, Los Angeles. The jury referred to the house as "the most promising concept in residential". This work continues 30 years of research in steel house design, first inspired by Myers' early experiences on naval aircraft carriers, and the work of Charles Eames, Le Corbusier, Rudolph Schindler and Pierre Koenig. In 2007, Myers' Wolf House was awarded the Prix du XXe siècle from the Royal Architectural Institute of Canada which "recognizes the enduring excellence of nationally significant architecture, such as landmark buildings in the historical context of Canadian Architecture".

Myers' design for the Seagram Museum in Waterloo, Ontario, was considered an "icon of Canadian Postmodernism and initiated a metamorphosis of the area."

== Death ==
Myers died from pneumonia at a hospital in Connecticut — on August 11, 2026, at the age of 91.

== Contributions to Post-Secondary Institutions ==
Myers taught architecture and lectured at Colleges and Universities from 1969, mentoring a generation of North American architects and planners. Over his career, he contributed to the growth, planning and development of major academic institutions. Many of these institutions exemplify the core principles inherent in Myers' work and design philosophy. His campus contributions include:

- Carroll Community College; (Master Plan)
- University of California, Santa Barbara; (Campus Planning)
- University of Cincinnati; (Calhoun Street Mixed-Use design)
- University of Alberta Edmonton; (Long-Range Development Plan, Housing Union Building and Continuing Consultant 1975-1978)
- University of California, Los Angeles; (Northwest Campus Plan, Housing and Commons & West Campus Plan)
- University of California, San Diego; (Scripps Institution of Oceanography)
- University of Maryland, Baltimore; (Master Plan)
- University of New Mexico Albuquerque; (Campus Development Plan & West Campus Plan)
- University of Southern California; (Educational Services Building design)
- University of Toronto; (Royal Conservatory of Music, Toronto)
- University of Virginia Charlottesville; (performing arts center and McIntire School of Music plan)
- Woodsworth College, University of Toronto; (new academic facilities)
- York University, Toronto; (Fine Arts Centre expansion)

== Projects (partial listing) ==
- 1967: STELCO Catalog Housing; early study of mass-produced steel housing.
- 1971: Myers Residence, Toronto, ON; demonstrates the feasibility of infilling a narrow urban lot, 25 feet (7.6 m) by 118 feet (36 m)
- 1971: DOFASCO Housing, Hamilton, ON; early assembly line steel housing project
- 1973: Housing Union Building (HUB Residence), University of Alberta; a 957-foot (292 m) long, climate-controlled galleria became a widely emulated prototype for cold Canadian climates.
- 1974: Wolf House, Toronto, ON; Architectural Record house, 1977, Royal Architectural Institute of Canada 2007 Prix du XXe Siècle Award, RAIC Centennial
- 1976: Innis College, Toronto, ON; old/new combination with atrium connection (with (Jack Diamond)
- 1976: Dundas Sherbourne Infill Housing, Toronto, ON; the first housing development undertaken by the City of Toronto's Non-Profit Housing Corporation, and the first infill housing scheme to be constructed in Toronto
- 1976: Citadel Theatre, Edmonton, AB; Canadian Governor General's Medal for Architecture, 1986 (Diamond, Myers and Wilkin Architects)
- 1980: Alcan Offices, Toronto, ON; Architectural Record, Record Interiors, 1981
- 1980: Grand Avenue / Bunker Hill, Los Angeles, California Master Plan; directed a team of ten leading architects and planners including Harvey S. Perloff, Lawrence Halprin, Cesar Pelli, Hardy Holzman Pfeiffer, KDG Architecture, Frank Gehry & Krueger, Legorreta Arquitectos, Edgardo Contini and Charles Willard Moore, and Urban Innovations Group
- 1983: Seagram Museum, Waterloo ON; Canadian Governor General's Medal for Architecture, 1986
- 1984: Unionville Library, Unionville, Ontario; serves as the major cultural facility and is a classic example of postmodernism in architecture
- 1985: Phoenix Municipal Government Center. Phoenix, AZ; Canadian Architect, Award of Excellence, 1988
- 1985: Canadian Broadcasting Centre Development/Design Guidelines, Toronto; studio facilities were programmed on the building's top floors.
- 1985: University of New Mexico Campus Development Plan, Albuquerque, New Mexico; 25-year physical development plan to accommodate 7,000 to 10,000 new students and approximately 5,000,000 square feet (460,000 m^{2}) of new development
- 1985 Stratford Festival Theatre Expansion, ON; modern addition for the theater housing the Stratford Festival of Canada
- 1987: Hasbro Inc. Showrooms and Offices, New York, NY; new home for the toy manufacturer's showrooms and executive offices in the shell of a cast iron department store (Stern's, 1896)
- 1987: Portland Center for the Performing Arts, Portland, OR; United States Institute for Theatre Technology (USITT) Merit Award, 1994 (with Boora Architects and ELS Architects)
- 1988: Calgary Olympic Arch Artwork, AB; one of several arch artworks created in honor of the 1988 Winter Olympics
- 1989: United States Pavilion, Expo '92, Seville, Spain; first all-California design team to represent the United States at an Exposition or World's Fair
- 1992: UCLA Northwest Campus Master Plan; Commons, and Residence Buildings major campus addition completed in association with Antoine Predock; Esherick Homsey Dodge & Davis; and Gensler and Associates
- 1992: Woodsworth College, University of Toronto, ON; Canadian Governor General's Medal for Architecture, 1992 (with KPMB)
- 1993: Cerritos Center for the Performing Arts, Cerritos, CA; United States Institute for Theatre Technology (USITT) Honor Award, 1994; first multi-form theater in the world at a scale of 900-2000 seats
- 1993: Art Gallery of Ontario, Stage III Expansion; American Institute of Architects, California Council Design Award, 1993
- 1994: Ivan Reitman Production Offices, Los Angeles, CA; American Institute of Architects, San Fernando Chapter Design Award, 1997
- 1997: New Jersey Performing Arts Center, Newark, NJ; United States Institute for Theatre Technology (USITT) Merit Award, 2000
- 1998: University of California, San Diego, Scripps Institution of Oceanography, La Jolla, California; 27,000 gsf research facility with eight laboratories, staff offices, lab support offices, seminar rooms, and conference room
- 1999: House and Studio at Toro Canyon, Montecito, CA; American Institute of Architects Housing PIA Award, Innovation in Housing Design, 2002
- 2001: Maverick Records Offices, Beverly Hills, CA; 10,000 sf of executive and creative offices for record label founded by Madonna, Frederick DeMann, Ronnie Dashev
- 2001: 9350 Civic Center Drive, Beverly Hills, CA; American Institute of Architects, California Council Merit Award, 2003
- 2004: Intermedia (production company) Offices, Beverly Hills, CA; interior offices for the film production company at 9350 Civic Center Drive
- 2007: Tempe Center for the Arts, Tempe, AZ; (with Architekton)
- 2014: Dr. Phillips Center for the Performing Arts, Orlando, FL; (with HKS & Baker Barrios)

== Exhibitions (partial listing) ==
- 2007 "Architecture of the Now and NEXT" Broad Center at UCLA, AIA/LA Awards (28/06/07-15/07/07)
- 2007 Festival of Architecture, Toronto, May 9-12th (Royal Architectural Institute of Canada's Prix du XXe Siècle Award)
- 2006 "West Coast Residential; The Contemporary and the Modern" A+D Museum, Los Angeles, CA (10/27/06–01/05/07).
- 2006 "The Architecture of the Theater: Learning From Italy" Istituto Italiano di Cultura, Los Angeles, CA (9/20/06–10/20/06).
- 2005 "Forever Modern: 50 Years of Record Houses" Pratt Manhattan Gallery, Pratt Institute, New York, NY.
- 2005 "Forever Modern: 50 Years of Record Houses "Forever Modern: 50 Years of Record Houses, AIA Boston, MA.
- 2005 13 Los Angeles Architects, Design Within Reach, Los Angeles
- 2005 34 Los Angeles Architects, A+D Museum, Los Angeles
- 2002 "3 Steel Houses" UCLA School of Architecture
- 2001 "3 Steel Houses" University Art Museum, University of California, Santa Barbara (04/10–06/17)
- 2000 International Bi-Annual Architecture Exhibition, São Paulo, Brazil.
- 2000 "[Re]Visioning Chapala; Architects Imagine 21st century Santa Barbara, University Art Museum, UCSB (July 29 - Sept. 3)
- 1998 The 1998 American Architecture Awards. The Chicago Athenaeum - Museum of Architecture & Design. June 8–August 16th, May 2–Jan. 3.
- 1998 "Building Culture Downtown," New Ways of Revitalizing the American City, National Building Museum, Washington DC.
- 1997 The Chicago Athenaeum, Frank E. Moss Courthouse Design Competition and New San Diego Federal Courthouse
- 1995 Royal Institute of British Architects, Manchester City Art Gallery Competition Exhibition
- 1994 United States Institute of Theatre Technology, Prague Exhibition
- 1991 "The Competition for the United States Pavilion, Expo '92, Seville, Spain," Graduate School of Architecture and Urban Planning, University of California, Los Angeles
- 1990 Mandeville Gallery, University of California, San Diego Exhibition of Phoenix Municipal Government Center model and drawings
- 1988 Architecture of Democracy, Phoenix Municipal Government Center, Wight Art Gallery, University of California, San Diego
- 1987 Reconnaitre Le Corbusier, Faculty of Architecture Gallery, University of Toronto
- 1987 Koplin Gallery, Los Angeles, Barton Myers Associates: Show of Models, Drawings and Sketches
- 1987 Phoenix City Hall Competition, Wight Gallery, UCLA
- 1986 A Measure of Consensus: Canadian Architecture in Transition; Vancouver, New York, Toronto, Montréal
- 1985 Architects' Drawings; The Charles H. Scott Gallery, Emily Carr College of Art and Design, Vancouver
- 1985 Recent Work; Clare Hall, Cambridge University, Cambridge, England
- 1984 Monument: Manifestation on Dealing with Ancient, Monuments Now; Studium Generale, Rijksuniversiteit Limburg, The Netherlands
- 1984 Dreams of Development; The Market Gallery, Toronto
- 1983 The Urban Solution: Toronto Life; Sable Castelli Gallery, Toronto
- 1983 Fresh Frontiers: Canadian Architects Abroad; The Art Gallery at Harbourfront, Toronto
- 1983 Seagram Museum Exhibit: School of Architecture; University of Toronto
- 1983 Aesthetics for the Cold; Hallwalls Gallery, Buffalo
- 1982 Major projects, Canada in Berlin; Akademie der Kunste, West Berlin
- 1982 A Design Process, A Grand Avenue; University of Virginia, Charlottesville, Virginia
- 1982 Exhibition of design drawings; Noval Gallery, Vancouver League of Architects, Vancouver
- 1980 Exhibition of Selected Projects; the School of Architecture, University of Toronto
- 1980 Ghent Square; the Canadian National Exhibition sponsored by the Royal Canadian Academy of Arts
- 1980 Selected Works; Walker Art Center, as published by City Segments
- 1980 The Work of Barton Myers as published in Design Quarterly No.108, UCLA
- 1979 Exhibition of Drawings; Ballenford Architectural Books
- 1979 Architectural Awareness Week, Queen's Park, Toronto
- 1974 Perspectus '74, Exhibition of City of Toronto Planning and Architecture, Toronto Chapter of Architects, David Mirvish Gallery
- 1974 Housing Union Building, Walker Art Gallery, Minneapolis
- 1974 Dundas/Sherbourne, City Hall, Toronto
- 1973 Work of Diamond and Myers at School of Architecture, University of Toronto
- 1973 "Exploring Toronto", Toronto Chapter of Architects, Nathan Phillips Square

== Television features ==
- 2000 HGTV (Home & Garden Television) "Water"
- 2000 House Beautiful A&E (Arts & Entertainment)
- 2000 HGTV (Home & Garden Television.) "21st century Homes"
- 1998 Canadian Television : The Wolf House Revisited.
- 1997 "Great Performances", The New Jersey Performing Arts Center Opening Night Gala Celebration. KCET, February 13, 1997. New Stage.
- 1997 "New Stage for a City", A Special Production of "State of the Arts," NJN/New Jersey Public Television.
- 1991 City Television: Fashion T.V.: Architect
- 1979 Channel 19 Urban Renewal Program
- 1977 CBC Money Makers
- 1974-75 CBC Consultant Urban Programs
- 1973 CITY Money Game CITY Home Show
- 1972 CTV "The Human Journey" series - Where We Live
- 1972 CBC "The Man at the Centre" - Urban Open Spaces
- 1971 CTV "People Worth Knowing"
- 1971 CBC "Man at the Centre" - City Streets

== Books (partial listing) ==
- "West Coast Residential: The Modern and the Contemporary" by Greg Bellerby (Jan. 2007).
- "3 Steel Houses" by Barton Myers (June 2006), Images Publishing, 128 pages.
- "Modern American Houses" by Clifford A. Pearson (Oct. 2005), pp. 126–129.
- "Up North: Where Canada's Architecture Meets the Land" by Lisa Rochon (Aug. 2004), Key Porter Books, pp. 139, 145-146, 148, 168, 215-216, 239, 253, 254-255.
- "Brave New Houses; Adventures in California Living" by Michael Webb (2003), Rizzoli, New York, pp 156–163.
- "House: American Houses for the New Century" by Raul A. Barreneche, & Cathy Lang Ho (2001) Universe Publishers, pp. 64–73
- "New Stage for a City: Designing the New Jersey Performing Arts Center" Michael Webb (1998) Images Publishing Group, 128 pages.
- "Museum Architecture" by Justin Henderson (1998). Rockport Publishers, Inc., pp. 24–31.
- "Interior Spaces of the USA: A Pictorial Review of Significant Interiors". Volume 3, (1997) Images Publishing Group, pp. 190–191.
- "On Stage: Super Structures" by Phillip Wilkinson (1996) Dorling Kindersley Ltd., pp. 14–15.
- Masters of Architecture Series: "Barton Myers Selected and Current Works" by Barton Myers and Stephen Dobney, Images Publishing Group. (1994) 256 pages.
- "Sourcebook of Contemporary North American Architecture" by Sylvia Hart Wright (1989), pp. 24–25, 89.
- "Educational Spaces: A Pictorial Review of Significant Spaces" by Antique Collectors Club, (1999), pp 132–135, 192-193.
- "25 Years of Record Houses" by Herbert L. Smith (1984). McGraw-Hill, New York, pp. 96–99.
- "Contemporary Canadian Architecture, The Mainstream and Beyond" by Ruth Cawker and William Bernstein (1983), Architectural Book Pub., pp. 188–191, back cover.
- "Vacant Lottery" by Barton Myers & George Baird (1978) Walker Art Center, Minneapolis, MN, 51 pages.
- "Glass House" John Hix (1974), Phaidon Press: London, pp. 177, 179.

== See also ==
- List of University of Waterloo people
