= Philip J. Currie =

Canadian paleontologist and curator (born 1949)

Phil Currie AOE FRSC FRCGS
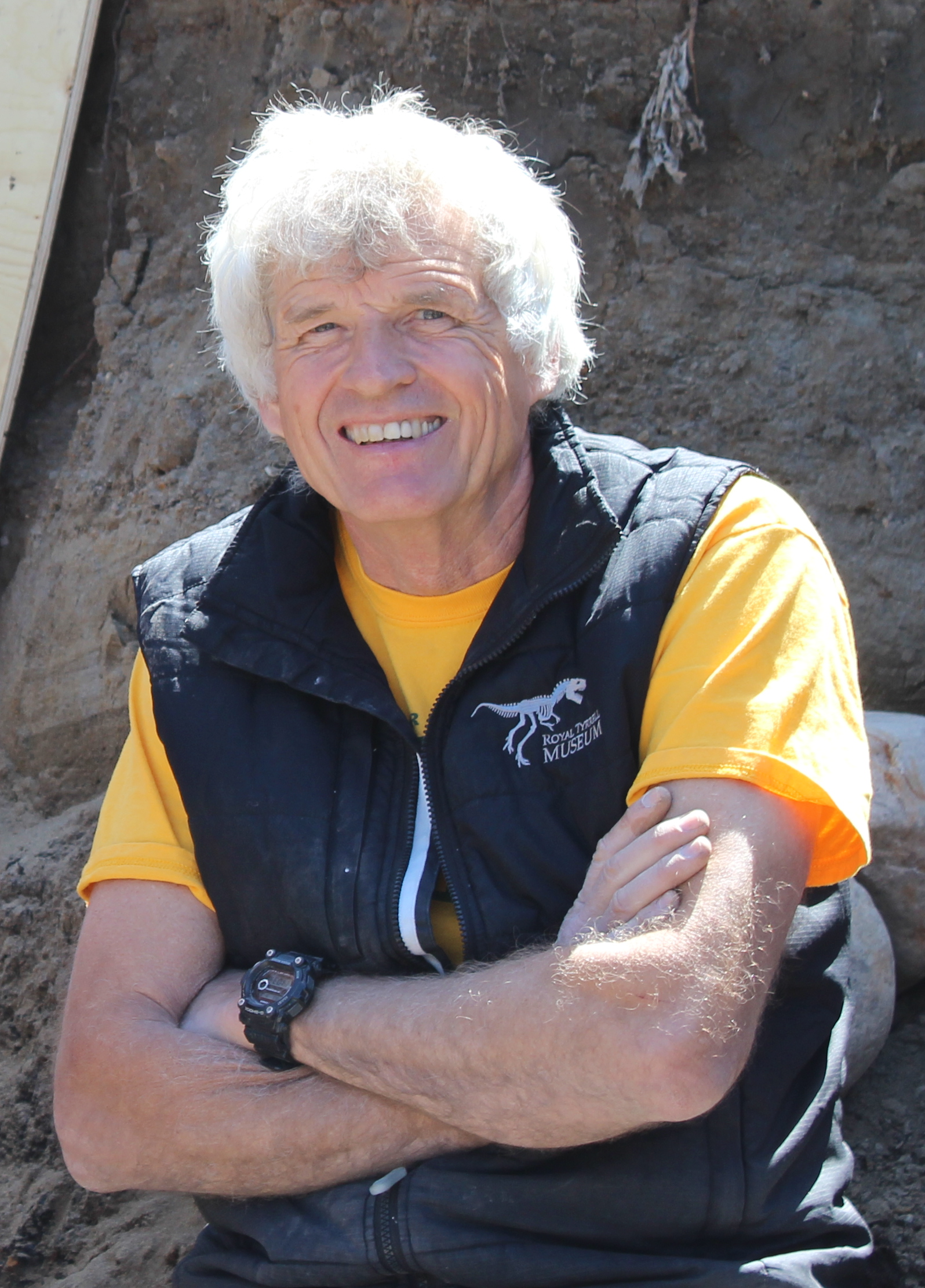
- Currie in 2014
- Born: March 13, 1949 (age 77); Brampton, Ontario, Canada
- Education: University of Toronto; McGill University
- Known for: Dinosaurs
- Spouse: Eva Koppelhus
- Scientific career
- Fields: Paleontology
- Workplaces: Royal Alberta Museum; Royal Tyrrell Museum of Palaeontology; University of Alberta
- Thesis: The Osteology and Relationships of Aquatic Eosuchians from the Upper Permian of Africa and Madagascar (1981)
- Doctoral advisor: Robert L. Carroll
- Website: apps.ualberta.ca/directory/person/pjcurrie

Philip John Currie AOE FRSC FRCGS (born March 13, 1949) is a Canadian palaeontologist and museum curator who helped found the Royal Tyrrell Museum of Palaeontology in Drumheller, Alberta and is now a professor at the University of Alberta in Edmonton. In the 1980s, he became the director of the Canada-China Dinosaur Project, the first cooperative palaeontological partnering between China and the West since the Central Asiatic Expeditions in the 1920s, and helped describe some of the first feathered dinosaurs. He is one of the primary editors of the influential Encyclopedia of Dinosaurs, and his areas of expertise include theropods (especially Tyrannosauridae), the origin of birds, and dinosaurian migration patterns and herding behavior. He was one of the models for palaeontologist Alan Grant in the film Jurassic Park.

== Biography ==
Currie received his Bachelor of Science degree from the University of Toronto in 1972, a Master of Science degree from McGill University in 1975, and a Doctor of Philosophy (PhD) degree in biology (with distinction) from the same institution in 1981. His master's and PhD theses were on synapsids and early aquatic diapsids respectively.

Currie became curator of earth science at the Provincial Museum of Alberta in Edmonton in 1976 just as he began the PhD program. Within three seasons he had so much success at fieldwork that the province began planning a larger museum to hold the collection. The collection became part of the Tyrrell Museum of Palaeontology, which was completed in 1985, and Currie was appointed curator of dinosaurs.

In 1986, Currie became the co-director of the joint Canada-China Dinosaur Project, with Dale Russell of the Canadian Museum of Nature in Ottawa and Dong Zhiming of the Institute of Vertebrate Paleontology and Paleoanthropology in Beijing.

== Contributions to palaeontology ==
Over the last 3 decades, Currie has worked on fossil discovery in Mongolia, Argentina, Antarctica, Dinosaur Provincial Park, Dry Island Buffalo Jump Provincial Park, and many other locations.

His contributions to palaeontology include synonymising the genera Troodon and Stenonychosaurus in 1987 (with the former name taking precedence) and later reversing this in 2017. He has also synonymised the ceratopsian taxon Rubeosaurus with Styracosaurus, the latter being the valid, senior synonym.

=== Bird-dinosaur link ===
One of Currie's main interests has been the evolutionary link between modern birds and non-avian dinosaurs. The similarities between troodontids and birds in particular made him a major proponent of the theory that birds are descended from dinosaurs, as did his finding that tyrannosaurids, along with many other non-avian theropod lineages, possessed furculae, a trait previously believed to be exclusive to birds and absent from non-avian dinosaurs. As part of the joint China-Canada Dinosaur Project, he helped describe two of the first dinosaur specimens from the lagerstätten of the Liaoning in China that clearly showed feather impressions: Protarchaeopteryx and Caudipteryx. In contrast with the 1996 discovery of Sinosauropteryx, which only showed the impression of downy filaments, these were indisputably feathers. This not only helped cement the theory that birds are descended from dinosaurs, but indicated that many dromaeosaurids were feathered. He was later featured in numerous popular articles and documentaries.

=== Archaeoraptor hoax ===
Currie was involved in exposing a composite specimen that had been the subject of the 1999 National Geographic "Archeoraptor" scandal.

=== Dinosaur behaviour ===
Currie became increasingly sceptical of the orthodox belief that large carnivorous dinosaurs were solitary animals, but there was no evidence for his hypothesis that they may have hunted in packs. However, circumstantial evidence came when he tracked down a site mentioned by Barnum Brown that featured 12 specimens of Albertosaurus from various age groups. Currie was also involved in the discovery of a bonebed which evidenced gregarious behaviour in the caenagnathoid Avimimus. In 2023, Currie co-authored a paper describing evidence from the Danek Bonebed that Albertosaurus engaged in cannibalism.

=== Phylogenetics ===
Currie has made important contributions to the study of phylogenetics. He contributed to a comprehensive revision of the phylogenetic relationships of ankylosaurid species in 2015. He also reassessed the phylogenetic status of Nipponosaurus sachalinensis, discovering that it was much more basal among the Lambeosaurinae than palaeontologists had previously thought. In 2022, he participated in a study that found Dineobellator to represent a novel dromaeosaurid outside any known clade of eudromaeosaurs.

=== Dinosaur anatomy ===
Currie has published multiple papers on the cranial anatomy of various dinosaurs. Together with Rodolfo Coria, he published a detailed description of the braincase of the large carcharodontosaurid Giganotosaurus carolinii in 2003, which led him to believe that Giganotosaurus and Carcharodontosaurus were very closely related genera. In 2017, he and Ariana Paulina-Carabajal wrote a paper on the anatomy of the well-preserved braincase of Murusraptor barrosaensis, finding it to be more similar to tyrannosaurids than to allosaurids or ceratosaurids. A year later, he coauthored a study detailing the endocranial morphology of the ankylosaurines Talarurus plicatospineus and Tarchia teresae. In 2019, together with David Christopher Evans, Currie described newly discovered cranial material of the dromaeosaurid Saurornitholestes langstoni and found the poorly known tooth taxon Zapsalis likely to represent the same taxon as Saurornitholestes.

Currie's contributions to the study of dinosaur dentition include helping discover the first known instance of alveolar remodelling in dinosaurs and revealing in a 2020 study that the dentition of Sinraptor bore extreme similarities to that of Allosaurus, further concluding that Sinraptor would likely have actively hunted medium-sized dinosaurs such as Jiangjunosaurus junggarensis.

Currie has extensively studied the subject of juvenile dinosaurs and dinosaur ontogeny. His publications on the subject have included studies on juveniles of Chasmosaurus, Pinacosaurus, Gorgosaurus, Daspletosaurus, and Saurornithoides.

In 1997, Currie teamed up with Microsoft's Chief Technical Officer Nathan Myhrvold to create a computer model demonstrating that diplodocids could snap their tails like whips, and create small sonic booms.

=== Pterosaurs ===
In addition to his work on dinosaurs, Currie has been involved in numerous research projects on pterosaurs. In 2011 and 2016, he was involved in the description of the first pterosaur fossils from the Northumberland Formation, a part of the Nanaimo Group, of Hornby Island in British Columbia, finding that they probably represented indeterminate members of Istiodactylidae and Azhdarchidae, respectively. However, subsequent reexamination identified the purported isodactylid as a saurodontid fish.In 2017, he assisted in the description of the first known pterosaur pelvic material from the Dinosaur Park Formation; however a correction published by the authors re-identified it as a tyrannosaur squamosal. He has also helped study pterosaur material from the Cenomanian found in Lebanon.

=== Rediscovery of old localities ===
Currie helped rediscover the type localities of the Mongolian sauropods Nemegtosaurus mongoliensis and Opisthocoelicaudia skarzynskii in 2017; the location of both quarries had become unknown due to them being described several decades before and not having been studied for some time. The next year, he published a paper as the lead author in which he suggested the two taxa may represent the same species.

=== Ichnofossils ===
Currie's research interests have included ichnofossils as well as body fossils. In 1979, at the beginning of his career, he and William A. S. Sarjeant described Amblydactylus kortmeyeri from the Peace River Valley. In 1981, Currie authored in the Journal of Vertebrate Paleontology a description of the ichnospecies Aquatilavipes swiboldae from the Aptian Gething Formation of British Columbia. He went on to work on dinosaur footprints from the St. Mary River Formation. In 2004, he studied footprint assemblages from the Lance Formation and described the ichnospecies Saurexallopus zerbsti. In 2018, Currie coauthored a study describing dinosaur footprints at the Nemegt locality.

=== Descriptions of new species ===
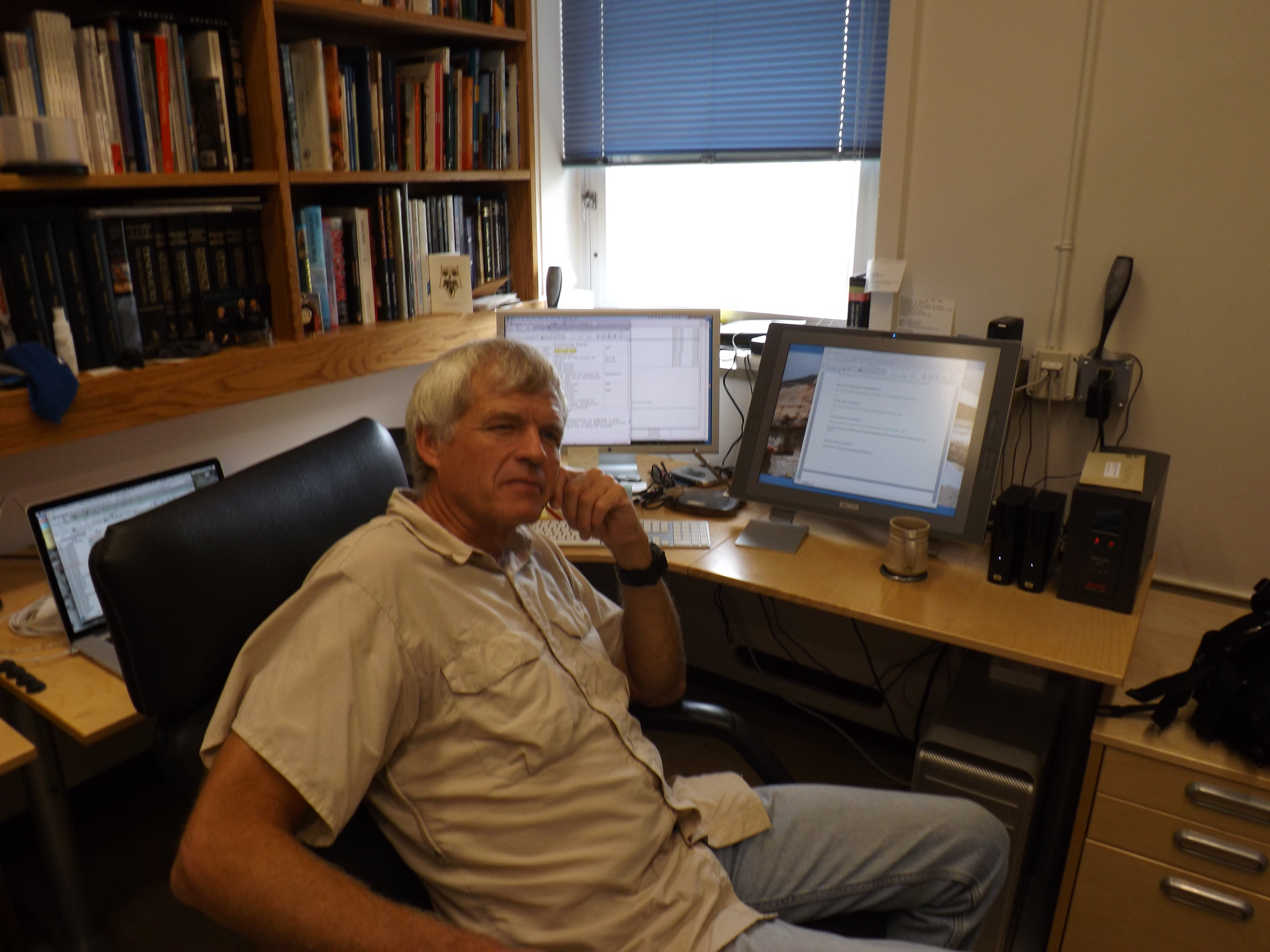
Currie in his office, 2013

Over the course of his career, Currie has described dozens of new species of dinosaurs as well as other animals. In 1980, he named the tangasaurid species Acerosodontosaurus piveteaui based on a partial skull and partial skeleton found in Madagascar. In 1993, he and Xi-Jin Zhao described Sinraptor dongi from the Shishugou Formation in Xinjiang. He was involved in the China-Canada Dinosaur Project as part of the research which described Protarchaeopteryx robusta and Caudipteryx zoui. In 2000, he was part of a team describing the Mongolian oviraptorid Nomingia gobiensis. In 2004, he was involved in the description of Atrociraptor marshalli. In 2009, he contributed to the scientific paper describing Hesperonychus elizabethae, the first known microraptorine found in North America. In 2012, Currie, along with David Christopher Evans and other colleagues, described the leptoceratopsids Gryphoceratops morrisoni and Unescoceratops koppelhusae from the Milk River Formation and Dinosaur Park Formation, respectively, of Alberta. In 2013, he worked with David Christopher Evans and Derek W. Larson to study and name the velociraptorine dromaeosaurid Acheroraptor temertyorum, and with Dong Zhiming and other palaeontologists to describe Nebulasaurus taito. In 2014, he and Victoria Megan Arbour described the ankylosaurid Zaraapelta nomadis. In 2015, Currie, as part of a team of twelve scientists, described Ischioceratops zhuchengensis from Shandong Province. In 2016, he and Gregory Funston described Apatoraptor pennatus, a novel caenagnathid taxon from the Horseshoe Canyon Formation of Alberta. In 2017, Currie helped describe Aepyornithomimus tugrikinensis, the first species of ornithomimosaur found in the Djadokhta Formation of Mongolia, Halszkaraptor escuilliei, a halszkaraptorine dromaeosaurid, and Latenivenatrix mcmasterae, the largest known troodontid. In 2019, Currie coauthored a study describing the fossil hagfish Tethymyxine tapirostrum found in the Hâdjula Lagerstätte, a fossil site of Cenomanian age in Lebanon, as well as one which described Mimodactylus libanensis, a pterosaur from that same locality. In 2020, Currie, together with longtime collaborator Rodolfo Coria, was part of a team of researchers that published a description of Lajasvenator ascheriae, the oldest known carcharodontosaurid from the Cretaceous period.

== Philip J. Currie Dinosaur Museum ==
In 2015, the Philip J. Currie Dinosaur Museum was opened in Wembley, Alberta. It is located about a 15-minute drive west of Grande Prairie, and about 500 kilometres (310 mi) northwest of Edmonton. The museum was designed by Teeple Architects, and has won several awards. It celebrates the Pipestone Creek bone bed, one of the world's richest dinosaur-bearing bone beds.

== Personal life ==
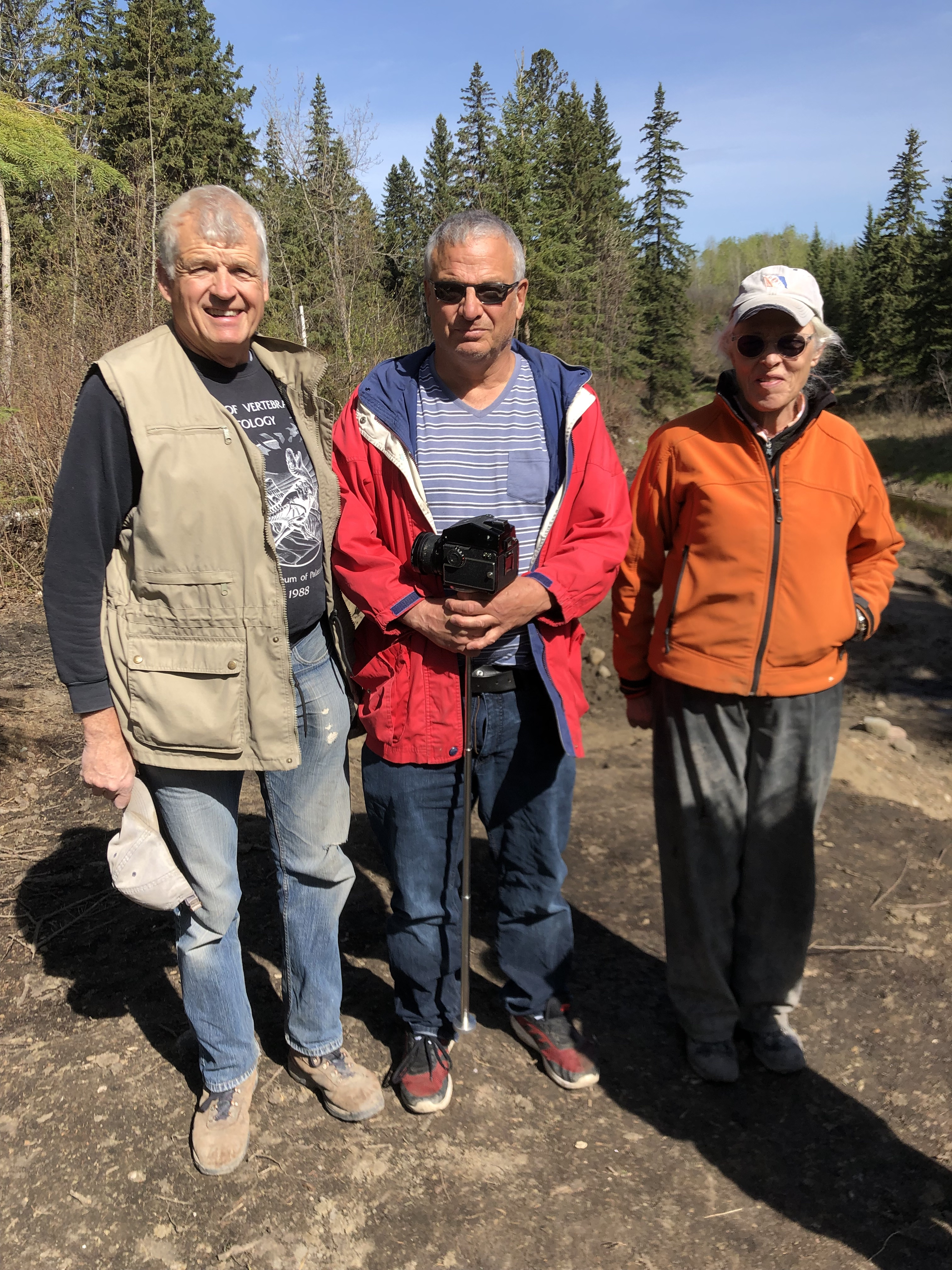
Currie (far left), Jason Woodhead, and Currie's wife, Eva Koppelhus

Currie is a lifelong fan of science fiction and the works of Edgar Rice Burroughs. He is married to the Danish palaeobotanist and palynologist Eva Koppelhus, and has three sons from a previous marriage.

== Awards and recognition ==
- 1981: Doctoral thesis nominated for the Canadian Society of Zoologist's best thesis of the year
- 1988: Sir Frederick Haultain Award for significant contributions to science in Alberta
- 1998: Featured as one of 12 outstanding Canadians in Maclean's
- 1998: Featured on the front cover of the Canadian issue of Time
- 1999: The American Association of Petroleum Geologists' Michel T. Halbouty Human Needs Award
- 1999: Elected to the Royal Society of Canada
- 2001: The festschrift Mesozoic Vertebrate Life: New Research Inspired by the Paleontology of Philip J. Currie was published in his honor
- 2003: Ranked as one of Canada's top five explorers by Time
- 2004: Michael Smith Award
- 2006: ASTech Award
- 2010: Alberta Order of Excellence
- 2012: The Royal Canadian Geographical Society's Gold Medal
- 2019: The Elizabeth 'Betsy' Nicholls Award for Excellence in Palaeontology
- 2022: Distinguished Explorer Award from the Roy Chapman Andrews Society

Dinosaur species named in honour of Currie include Quilmesaurus curriei (Coria, 2001), Epichirostenotes curriei (Sullivan et al., 2011), Teratophoneus curriei (Carr et al., 2011), Philovenator curriei (Xu et al., 2012), and Albertavenator curriei (Evans et al., 2017).

== Bibliography ==
As one of the world's foremost palaeontologists, Currie has been featured in many films, programs in radio and television, as well as in newspapers. Apart from this, he has also been accessorial to many books:

- (with Carpenter K); Dinosaur Systematics: Approaches and Perspectives (Cambridge University Press, 1990), ISBN 0-521-43810-1.
- (with Sovák J); The flying dinosaurs: the illustrated guide to the evolution of flight (Red Deer College Press, 1991).
- (with Spinar V.Z. & Sovák J); Great Dinosaurs: From Triassic Through Jurassic to Cretaceous (Borders Press, 1994).
- (with Koppelhus E.B.); 101 Questions about Dinosaurs, (Dover Publications, 1996) ISBN 0-486-29172-3.
- (with Padian K); Encyclopedia of Dinosaurs (Academic Press, 1997) ISBN 0-12-226810-5.
- (with Mastin C.O. & Sovák J); The Newest and Coolest Dinosaurs (Grasshopper Books, 1998).
- (with Tanka S, Sereno P.J. & Norell M); Graveyards of the dinosaurs: what it's like to discover prehistoric creatures (Hyperion Books for Children, 1998).
- (with Sovak J & Felber E.P), A Moment in Time with Troodon (Fitzhenry & Whiteside, 2001).
- (with Koppelhus E.B. & Sovák J); A Moment in Time with Sinosauropteryx (Fitzhenry & Whiteside, 2001).
- (with Felber E.P. & Sovák J); A Moment in Time with Albertosaurus (Troodon Productions, 2001).
- (with Koppelhus E.B. & Sovák J); A Moment in Time with Centrosaurus (Fitzhenry & Whiteside, 2001).
- (with Koppelhus E, Orsen M.J., Norell M, Hopp T.P., Bakker R et.al); Feathered Dragons: Studies on the Transition from Dinosaurs to Birds (Indiana University Press, 2004) ISBN 0-253-34373-9.
- (with Špinar Z.V., Spinar V.S. & Sovák J); The Great Dinosaurs: A Study of the Giants' Evolution (Caxton Editions, 2004).
- (with Koppelhus E.B.); Dinosaur Provincial Park: a spectacular ancient ecosystem revealed, Vol. 1 (Indiana University Press, 2005) ISBN 0-253-34595-2.
- (with Tanke D.H. & Langston W); A new horned dinosaur from an Upper Cretaceous bonebed in Alberta (NRC Research Press, 2008).

== Selected works ==
- Currie, Philip J., ed. (1993). "Results from the Sino-Canadian Dinosaur Project". Canadian Journal of Earth Sciences. 30 (10): 1997–2272. doi:10.1139/e93-175.
- Currie, Philip J., ed. (1996). "Results from the Sino-Canadian Dinosaur Project, Part 2". Canadian Journal of Earth Sciences. 33 (4): 511–648. doi:10.1139/e96-040.
