= Teeple =

Teeple is a surname. Notable people with the surname include:

- Charles S. Teeple (1830–1881), American politician
- Stephen Teeple (born 1954), Canadian architect
- John E. Teeple (1874–1931), American chemical engineer
