= Early Learning Centre (disambiguation) =

Early Learning Centre or Early Learning Center may refer to:

- Early Learning Centre, a British children's retailer
- Early Learning Center, a Russian children's retailer
- Early Learning Centre (building), of the University of Toronto
