= Teeple Architects =

Canadian architectural firm

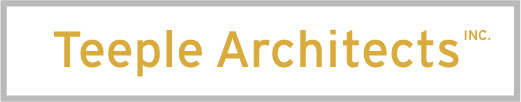

Practice information
- Key architects: Stephen Teeple (Principal); Chris Radigan (Partner); Richard Lai (Principal); Myles Craig (Principal); Tomer Diamant (Principal); Avery Guthrie (Principal); Wes Wilson (Principal); Robert Cheung (Associate); Darryl Biedron (Associate)
- Founded: 1989
- Location: Toronto ON Canada

Significant works and honors
- Projects: 60 Richmond Street East Co-op; Stephen Hawking Centre at Perimeter Institute; Sherbourne Common Pavilion
- Awards: Governor General's medals Ontario Association of Architects Award; Canadian Architect Awards of Excellence

Website
- teeplearch.com

Teeple Architects is an architecture firm based in Toronto founded by Stephen Teeple, in the year 1989. The firm is known to design several buildings in Canada, that focus on urban development, and sustainable design.

Stephan Teeple established the firm in Toronto in 1989 and has completed numerous large-scale projects relating to university campus residences and student centres. The firm also has an extended background in various works recognized in institutional, commercial, and residential buildings throughout the Toronto area and beyond the Canadian border. Projects from Teeple Architects are often praised for their creative and successful design responses to the surrounding site, such as reducing carbon emissions within their materials and designs to positively impact the climate, to bringing awareness to social-cultural issues whilst being restricted to tight budgets. On a local, national, and international scale, the work of Teeple Architects has received recognition for design excellence and sustainability. These accolades include six Governor General's Medals for Architecture, Canada's highest architectural honour, the Holcim Award for sustainable innovation, and more than 28 LEED awards.

== Selected projects ==
Teeple's works include 60 Richmond Street East Housing Co-operative in Toronto, completed in 2010. Writing about the project in No Mean City, Canadian architecture critic Alex Bozikovic remarks, "It has the gutsy but practical spirit of Toronto's best architecture: It's green, hardy, and very inexpensive, and provides 85 large and comfortable apartments for Toronto Community Housing tenants." In 2015, the studio completed the Philip J. Currie Dinosaur Museum, which features an unusual geometric form resembling a dinosaur with skin and bones in Wembley, Alberta. In 2018, Stephen Teeple received an Honorary Degree from Trent University for adding four buildings to Symons Campus, including the triangular, 34,000-square-foot Student Centre.

=== Education ===
- University of Toronto Graduate House (with Thom Mayne), Toronto, Ontario, 2000
- Albert Thornbrough Engineering Building, College of Physical and Engineering Science (CPES), University of Guelph, Guelph, Ontario, 2000
- North Campus Building, University of Western Ontario (with aTRM Architects), London, Ontario, 2000
- Early Learning Centre, Toronto, Ontario, 2003
- Arnie Lowenberger Residence, Brock University, St. Catharines, Ontario, 2003
- Chemical Science Building, Trent University, Peterborough, Ontario, 2004
- Langara College Library and Classroom Building (with Hancock Bruckner Eng + Wright Architect), Vancouver, British Columbia, 2007
- Langara Student Union Building and Academic Building C (with IBI-HB Architects), Vancouver, British Columbia, 2008
- Durham College Student Services Expansion, Oshawa, Ontario, 2010
- Sadlon Centre for Health and Wellness (with aTRM Architects, Ted Handy and Associates), Georgian College, Barrie, Ontario, 2011
- Stephen Hawking Centre at Perimeter Institute, Waterloo, Ontario, 2011
- Concert hall at University of Manitoba
- Morgan State University Calvin and Tina Tyler Hall (with GWWO Architects), Baltimore, Maryland, 2020 ^{[22]}

=== Civic ===
- Toronto Public Library – Humber Bay Library renovation, Toronto, Ontario, 1996
- Toronto Public Library – Bendale Library renovation, Toronto, Ontario, 1999
- Toronto Public Library – Eatonville Library reconstruction, Toronto, Ontario, 2001
- Ajax Main Central Library, Ajax, Ontario, 2002
- Beausoleil First Nation Community Centre, Christian Island, Ontario, 2006
- Montrose Cultural Centre (with Kasian Architecture), Grand Prairie, Alberta, 2009
- Sherbourne Common Pavilion, Toronto, Ontario, 2011
- John M. Harper Library and Stork Family YMCA, Waterloo, Ontario, 2011
- GO Pedestrian Bridge, Pickering, Ontario, 2012
- Art Gallery of Grand Prairie, Grand Prairie, Alberta, 2012
- Philip J. Currie Dinosaur Museum (with ATB Architects, Reich+Petch), Wembley, Alberta, 2012
- Clareview Recreation Centre and Branch Library, Edmonton, Alberta, 2013

=== Religious ===
- Scarborough Chinese Baptist Church, Toronto, Ontario, 2007
- Sisters of St. Joseph Motherhouse, Peterborough, Ontario, 2009

=== Residential ===
- Heathdale House, Toronto, Ontario, 2004
- Pachter Residence, Toronto, Ontario, 2005
- 60 Richmond Street East, Toronto, Ontario 2010
- Nobu residences, Toronto, Ontario 2017

=== Commercial ===
- Bensimon Byrne Wellington, Toronto, Ontario, 2002

== Awards ==
=== Queen's Diamond Jubilee Medal ===
For outstanding contribution to Canadian culture and service to the Royal Canadian Academy of Arts

=== Canadian Governor General's Awards for Architecture ===
- 1994, Trent University Childcare Centre
- 1997, Burt Matthews Hall Addition, University of Waterloo
- 2002, College of Engineering and Physical Science (addition to Albert Thornborough Building), University of Guelph
- 2008, Chemical Science Complex, Trent University
- 2008, Scarborough Chinese Baptist Church
- 2014, 60 Richmond East Housing Co-operative

=== Canadian Architect's Award ===
- 1996, Centre for Environmental Science & Engineering, University of Guelph
- 1997, ESE Building, University of Waterloo
- 1999, Graduate Residence, University of Toronto
- 2004, New Academic Science Complex, Trent University
- 2005, Library and Classroom Building, Langara College
- 2007, 60 Richmond St. East Housing Development
- 2009, Sherbourne Common Pavilion

=== Canadian Wood Council Awards ===
- 1998, Squirrel`s Nest Childcare Centre

=== Alberta Architect's Association Awards ===
- 2010, Montrose Cultural Centre

=== Ontario Architect's Association Awards ===
- 1994, Trent University Childcare Centre
- 1997, Burt Matthews Hall Addition, University of Waterloo
- 2001, Honour Court and Entrance Gate, York University
- 2002, Graduate Residence, University of Toronto
- 2002, Eatonville Public Library (Honourable Mention)
- 2005, Early Learning Centre, University of Toronto (Bronze)
- 2005, Heathdale House (Honourable Mention)
- 2006, Chemical Science Complex, Trent University (Honourable Mention)
- 2007, Pachter Residence
- 2008, Scarborough Chinese Baptist Church
- 2010, 60 Richmond St. East Housing Development (Gold Standing)
- 2012, Sisters of St. Joseph Motherhouse
- 2012, Stephen Hawking Centre at the Perimeter Institute for Theoretical Physics
- 2014, County of Simcoe Administration Centre

=== City of Cambridge Urban Design Awards ===
- 2003, Preston Branch Library

=== City of Toronto Urban Design Awards ===
- 2000, Eglinton Spectrum Public School (Honourable Mention)
- 2003, Eatonville Public Library
- 2011, 60 Richmond St. East Housing Development
- 2011, Sherbourne Common Pavilion (Honourable Mention)
- 2021, SQ2 Condos & POPS

=== City of North York Urban Design Awards ===
- 1997, Glen Long Community Centre

=== City of Mississauga Urban Design Awards ===
- 1997, Mississauga Sailing Club
- 2009, Sherbourne Common Pavilion
- 2009, Mississauga Plastic Surgery Clinic

=== City of Scarborough Urban Design Awards ===
- 1995, Squirrel`s Nest Childcare Centre

=== Progressive Architecture Award ===
- 1999, Graduate Residence, University of Toronto

=== Holcim Awards ===
- 2005, Library and Classroom Building, Langara College

=== Plachta Prize for Architecture ===
- 1994, Trent University Childcare Centre
- 2001, Honour Court and Entrance Gate, York University
- 2007, Pachter Residence

=== SAB Award ===
- 2008, Langara College Library + Classroom Building
- 2010, 60 Richmond St. East Housing Development (Gold Standing)
- 2013, Simcoe County Administrative Building

=== Design Exchange Awards ===
- 2005, Early Learning Centre, University of Toronto (Bronze)
- 2005, Heathdale House (Honourable Mention)
- 2006, St. Joseph Media
- 2007, Pachter Residence
- 2010, 60 Richmond St. East Housing Development (Gold Standing)
- 2010, Langara Student Union (Honourable Mention)

=== PUG Awards ===
- 2010, 60 Richmond St. East Housing Development

=== Archdaily Building of the Year Awards ===
- 2011, 60 Richmond St. East Housing Development
