= Timothy Fellows =

American farmer and politician

Timothy Hopkins Fellows (March 14, 1812 – November 5, 1894) was an American farmer from Bloomfield, Wisconsin who served on the board of supervisors of Bloomfield (including as its chairman) and also served two one-year terms (1852–1853) as a Free Soil Party member of the Wisconsin State Assembly from Walworth County.

== Background ==
Fellows was born March 14, 1812, in Luzerne County, Pennsylvania, one of thirteen children born to Abiel Fellows, Jr., and his third wife, Dorcas Hopkins. At the age of seventeen he joined his father in moving to Kalamazoo County, Michigan, where he eventually bought his own farm and farmed for about a decade. He married Elizabeth (or Eliza; sources differ) Ann Duncan on December 1, 1831. The couple were to have eleven children, six of whom survived to adulthood.

In the spring of 1840, the family moved to Wisconsin Territory, settling in the southeast corner of Walworth County on about half a square mile of land in Sections 34 and 35 on the south edge of the county and of the state, creating a homestead where he would live for the rest of his life. This was frontier country, wild and without roads; Fellows had to blaze the trees in order not to lose his way. In addition to farming, Fellows also worked as a merchant in his early years.

== Public office ==
Fellows served repeatedly as chairman or member of the town board of supervisors of Bloomfield, after it was created upon the partitioning of Geneva into four towns. He was first elected in 1844 in a special election, elected and served as chairman in 1846, and elected again in 1849 and 1850. In 1846 he was also elected to his first term on the county's board of supervisors. Although his father had been a Democrat, Fellows was initially aligned with the Whigs.

He became an ardent abolitionist and helped with the Underground Railroad, at one time sending his oldest son Theodore to escort an escaped slave to the next station. In 1851 he was elected to the Assembly for a one-year term, as a member of the Free Soil Party (although at least one paper referred to him as a "Free Democrat"), defeating Hilton W. Boyce and Moses Seymour; and he was re-elected in 1852 (the district now consisting of the Towns of Bloomfield, Linn and Walworth), defeating Whig Lewis N. Wood (who had served in that year's session with him)) and Albert Y. Wheeler. He did not return to the Assembly, and was succeeded by Whig Phipps W. Lake. Upon the organization of the Republican Party, Fellows became an enthusiastic member and supporter thereof.

Fellows was elected to several more terms on Bloomfield's board, in 1856, 1857, 1865, 1868 (serving again as chairman), and one final time in 1878 (again becoming chairman). In 1873 he was elected to the county board for the third and final time.

== Last years ==
As of 1882, Fellows and his wife still lived on their farm in Bloomfield, which at the time was about 600 acres (roughly one square mile). They were both members of the local Congregational Church. His wife died April 23, 1887. Fellows himself died on November 5, 1894, at his Bloomfield homestead, which he had been sharing with his son Gilmore and the latter's family. They are buried at Hillside Cemetery in Genoa City, Wisconsin.
