= Stephen Teeple =

Canadian architect

- Born: April 17, 1954 (age 72); St. Thomas, Ontario, Canada
- Education: University of Waterloo, Columbia University
- Occupation: Architect

Stephen Teeple, OAA, RAIC, RCA (born April 17, 1954) is a Canadian architect based in Toronto, Ontario. According to critic Ian Chodikoff, "He is known for his skill in producing work that is typified by strong linearity and expressive compositions containing a rich and highly detailed palette of materials such as brick, stone and wood". In 1989, Teeple founded the architecture firm Teeple Architects. Teeple's expertise encompasses residential, commercial, institutional, cultural and civic projects including community buildings such as recreational centers, museums and libraries.

== Education and formative years ==
Born in St. Thomas, Ontario, Teeple grew up with aspirations of becoming a pilot. However, when he entered high school his interests shifted to visual arts, leading him to apply to the architecture program at the University of Waterloo, in Cambridge, Ontario. In 1980, Teeple graduated with a Bachelor of Architecture. Shortly after, he became a member of the Ontario Association of Architects in 1988. Teeple later moved to New York City to continue his formal education in architecture at Columbia University. In 1989, he graduated with a Master of Science in Building Design, studying under Kenneth Frampton.

== Professorship ==
Alongside design contributions to the architecture community, Teeple has engaged with several Canadian architecture schools such as Ryerson University, University of Waterloo, Carleton University, University of Toronto, Dalhousie University, University of Manitoba and University of Western Ontario in delivering lectures and providing critics of student work.

== Style and methodology ==
Teeple's work follows Kenneth Frampton's teachings on modern architecture having as much value on structure and construction as space and form. His work "can be viewed as a mixture of well-crafted modernism that follows the works of the late Ron Thom, [as] it employs expressive geometry." Teeple's emphasis on sustainability is evident with over 22 LEED certified projects that are constructed or under construction by Teeple Architects.

== Notable projects ==
=== Stephen Hawking Centre ===
Located in Waterloo, Ontario, The Stephen Hawking Centre is an expansion of the existing Perimeter Institute for Theoretical Physics research facility. The 55,000 square feet project completed construction in 2012, and received the OAA Design Excellence Award in the same year. The client requested that the project “provide the optimal environment for the human mind to conceive of the universe.” As a result of the site constraints regarding an adjacent flood plain surrounding the building, the massing of the extension was raised on stilts, which creates a hovering effect above an existing reflecting pool. The building extension emphasizes collectiveness, as well as transparency between programs "that encourages interaction among the various disciplines of physics."

=== 60 Richmond Housing Cooperative ===
60 Richmond Street is an "11-story, 85-unit mixed use building" located in Toronto, Canada. Completed in 2010, "this project explores ideas for the future of urbanism in the North American city, and it seeks to understand and express the notion that urban form can simultaneously be environmental form." The LEED Gold cooperative housing project was awarded the Ontario Association of Architects Design Excellence Award in 2010 and the Canadian Architect Award of Excellence in 2007. The design of the project was driven by the program — a co-op that houses hospitality workers. "60 Richmond was conceived a solid mass that was carved-into to create openings and terraces at various levels."

=== Philip J. Currie Dinosaur Museum ===
The Philip J. Currie Dinosaur Museum is a cultural project completed in 2014 that doubles as a center of paleontology in the fossil-rich landscape of Wembley, Alberta. The project design aims to tell a narrative of the Pipestone Creek Dinosaur Bonebed's discovery and excavation. Sequence and circulation define a narrative for experiencing the museum. The museum features a dinosaur skeleton display in an excavated exhibition space four meters below grade. A secondary gallery is located further below grade with a sloping floor that directs the visitors through the space. The building form emulates the prairie landscape and the angular roof structure alludes to the Rocky Mountains to the south-west. The project uses wooden post and beam construction in reference to the Peace River Country’s history of agriculture and forestry. A new technology was developed for the structure’s connection nodes as they were required to support up to eight beams on one single point.

=== Picasso on Richmond ===
Located in Toronto's Entertainment District, Picasso is a 39-storey, 403-suite condominium building. In 2016, Picasso on Richmond won Urban Toronto's Best Tall Building Award.

== Other projects of significance ==
Clareview Community Recreation Centre & Branch Library, Edmonton, Alberta (2014)

Nunavut Arctic College Expansion, Nunatta Campus (2018)

Langara College Library (2007)

Langara College Science & Technology Building (2016)

Trent University Student Centre (2017)

Sherbourne Common Pavilion, Toronto (2012)

University of Toronto Graduate House, University of Toronto (completed with Morphosis Architects) (2000)
