= College of Computational, Mathematical, and Physical Sciences (University of Guelph) =

Division of the University of Guelph, Ontario, Canada

- Type: Public
- Established: October 16, 2025; 9 months ago
- Parent institution: University of Guelph
- Location: Guelph, Ontario, Canada
- Website: uoguelph.ca/ccmps

The College of Computational, Mathematical, and Physical Sciences (CCMPS; formerly the College of Engineering and Physical Sciences) is one of eight faculties – referred to as “colleges” – at the University of Guelph in Ontario, Canada. CCMPS operates on the University of Guelph main campus, one of four across Ontario, and has one of the largest faculty, staff, and student populations of the seven colleges at U of G.

CCMPS offers undergraduate degrees, master's and PhD graduate programs spanning disciplines in: Bioinformatics, Biophysics, Chemistry, Computational Sciences, Computer Science, Cybersecurity and Threat Intelligence, Data Science, Mathematics and Statistics, Physics, Software Engineering, and Toxicology. The current dean is interim dean Dr. Stacey Scott.

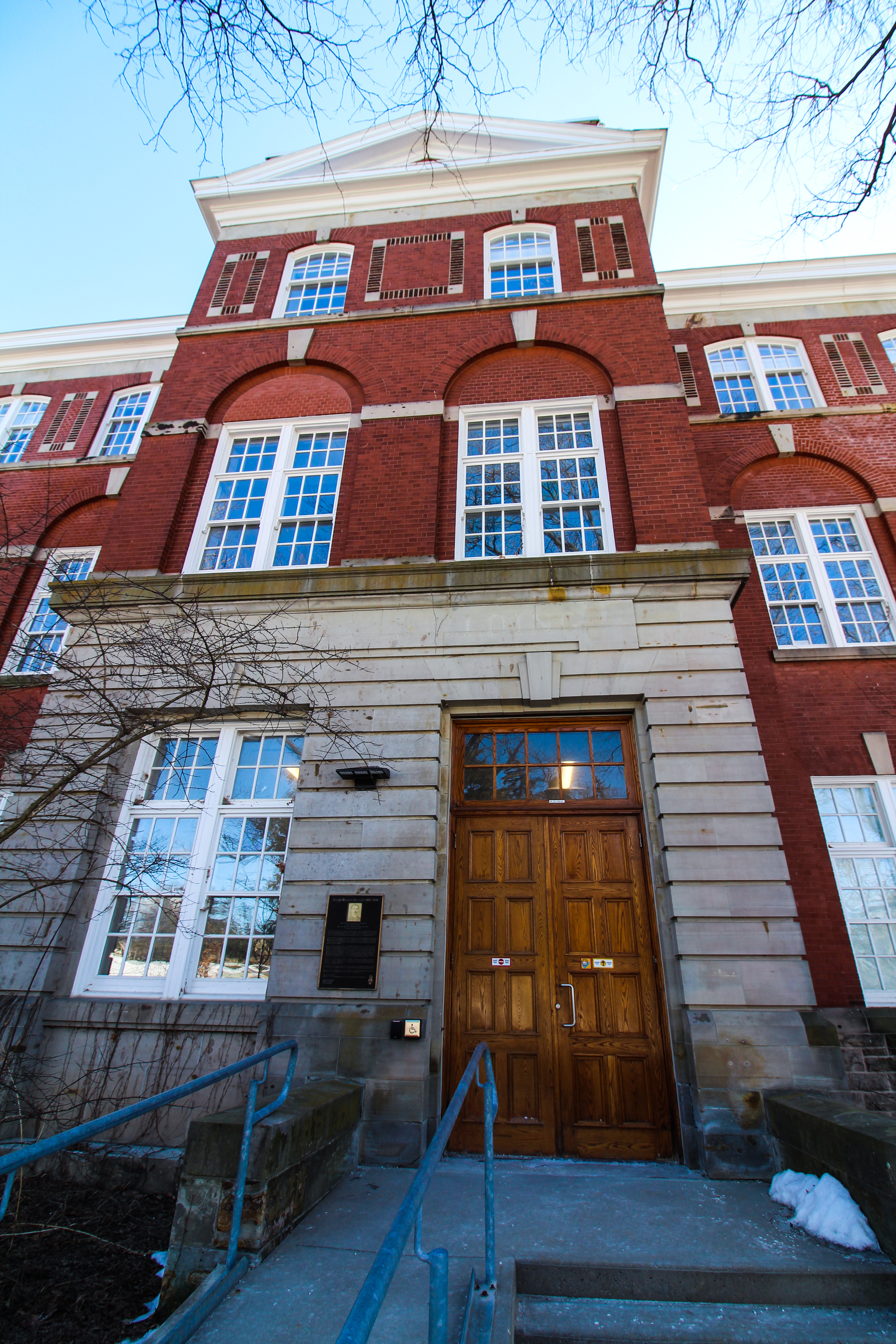
The recently renovated Reynolds Building houses CEPS' School of Computer Science and related courses.

CEPS Facts
2019-20
Undergraduate Students	2,000+
Graduate Students	294
International Students	352
Full-time Faculty	90
Full-time Staff	50
Graduates Worldwide	13,000+

== History of the College ==
The Province of Ontario purchased 200 hectares (490 acres) of farmland and opened the Ontario School of Agriculture, May 1, 1874, which later became Ontario Agricultural College (OAC). The Macdonald Institute and Ontario Veterinary College (OVC) were created in 1903 and 1922, respectively, and in 1964, the three bodies merged to form a single institution: the University of Guelph.

While CEPS did not exist in its current form at the time, its subject areas were taught across the university. For example, Engineering had been taught within OAC in various formats since its establishment in 1874. In 1957, the Department of Agricultural Engineering changed its name to the Department of Engineering Science. In 1965, the Senate of the University of Guelph established The School of Agricultural Engineering further adding the B.Sc.(Eng) degree. In 1969, Wellington College was divided into the College of Arts, the College of Physical Science, and the College of Social Science.

In 1989, OAC's School of Engineering merged with the College of Physical Sciences to form the College of Physical and Engineering Sciences. In 2008, the University of Guelph launched Canada's first full-fledged Nanoscience major within CEPS. In 2017, the college's name was changed to the “College of Engineering and Physical Sciences."

The Physical Science and Engineering Education Centre (PSEER) was established in 2012 within the College of Physical and Engineering Sciences to support teaching and learning in Chemistry, Physics, Mathematics and Statistics, Computer Science, and Engineering. The centre provided funding, events, and resources to advance science and engineering education and research on teaching practices.

In late 2018, the University of Guelph established the Centre for Advancing Ethical and Responsible Artificial Intelligence (CARE-AI). One of just a few groups of its kind, the research and teaching centre aims to improve life through artificial intelligence and address ethics in AI.

In June 2025, the University of Guelph’s Senate voted to dissolve the College of Engineering, and Physical Sciences and its associated School of Engineering, effective July 1, and create two new colleges: College of Computational, Mathematical and Physical Sciences, and College of Engineering. This was the first time in nearly 20 years that a new faculty had been created at the University of Guelph.

The College is one of eight at the University of Guelph and focuses on research and teaching in fundamental and applied sciences. It offers undergraduate and graduate programs that include opportunities for experiential learning. The College conducts research across a range of scientific disciplines and maintains partnerships with external organizations.

=== College of Engineering and Physical Sciences Today ===
Today, the college is home to three departments and one school. Its key priorities are grounded in research and education. Its about page state that “alongside our stakeholders and other U of G Colleges, our exceptional community is relentless in its pursuit to solve some of the world’s most complex problems.”

== College of Engineering ==
Following the decision to dissolve CEPS and establish two new colleges, the College of Engineering was created The College is dedicated to engineering education and research in areas such as water and environmental engineering, sustainable energy systems, instrumentation design, resource and waste management, intelligent systems and automation, food and bioprocess engineering, and more. Located in the Albert A. Thornborough Building, the College is home to four departments:

=== College of Engineering Departments ===
- Civil, Environmental, and Water Resources Engineering
- Electrical and Computer Engineering
- Interdisciplinary Engineering
- Mechanical Engineering

The College of Engineering retains a number of activities from outreach activities in what was CEPS, including Go Eng Girl and Women in Engineering.

Alongside the College of Biological Science and the Ontario Agricultural College, CEPS created BattleSTEM (formerly known as the Guelph Science Olympics), in 2009).

== Departments and programs ==
=== Department of Chemistry ===
The Department of Chemistry focuses its activities and education on chemistry theory and research, including analytical, inorganic, nanoscience, organic, theoretical, polymer, biological or biochemistry, physical chemistry, and more. Faculty members are located in the McNaughton Building and the Summerlee Science Complex.

==== Undergraduate programs ====
- Chemistry B.Sc. (Co-op available)
- Biological and Pharmaceutical Chemistry B.Sc. (Co-op available)

==== Graduate programs ====
- Chemistry M.Sc. and PhD via partnership with the University of Waterloo Guelph-Waterloo Centre for Graduate Work in Chemistry and Biochemistry, which is highly recognized across Canada as one of the best chemistry graduate programs in the country.

=== School of Computer Science ===
The School of Computer Science focuses its activities and education computer science theory and research, including software development, bioinformatics, data science, computer science, computational intelligence, cybersecurity, game programming, software engineering and design, human computer interaction, artificial intelligence, and more. The school is located in the Reynolds building,

==== Undergraduate programs ====
- Bachelor of Computing General B.Comp
- Computer Science B.Comp (Co-op available)
- Software Engineering B.Comp (Co-op available)

==== Graduate programs ====
- Computer Science M.Sc.
- Cybersecurity and Threat Intelligence MCTI (Course-based)
- Computational Sciences PhD
- Master of Cybersecurity Leadership and Cyberpreneurship

Alongside the College of Biological Science and the Ontario Agricultural College, CEPS created BattleSTEM (formerly known as the Guelph Science Olympics), in 2009).

=== Department of Mathematics and Statistics ===
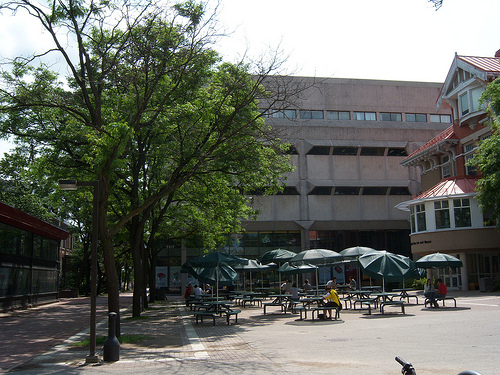
The MacNaughton Building behind Branion Plaza on campus.

The Department of Mathematics and Statistics focuses its activities and education on mathematics theory and research including bioinformatics, artificial intelligence, modelling and simulation, imaging, dynamical systems, simulation models, game theory, quantum computing, climate change, networks, statistical learning, infectious disease, data science, biostatistics, and more. The department is located in the MacNaughton building.

==== Undergraduate programs ====
- Bachelor of Mathematics, B.Math

==== Graduate programs ====
- Master of Data Science, M.D.S
- Mathematics M.Sc., PhD
- Statistics M.Sc., PhD

=== Department of Physics ===
The Department of Physics is located in the MacNaughton building and focuses its activities and education on physics theory and research including applied, astrophysics and gravitation, atomic and molecular, biophysics, chemical, condensed matter and materials, nanoscience, subatomic, and planetary physics.

In addition, the department has its own observatory located on top of the building. Guelph faculty members collaborate with many off-campus research institutions including: CSA/NASA, the Perimeter Institute for Theoretical Physics, the Canadian Light Source, and TRIUMF as well as on campus collaborations with the Advanced Analysis Centre. Faculty member Ralf Gellert is a lead scientist for the Alpha particle X-ray spectrometer (APXS) that is on board the Mars Exploration Rovers (MER).

==== Undergraduate programs ====
- Biological and Medical Physics B.Sc. (Co-op available)
- Physics B.Sc. (Co-op available)
- Theoretical Physics B.Sc.

==== Graduate programs ====
- Physics M.Sc., PhD

=== Interdisciplinary Programs ===
==== Undergraduate programs ====
- Biomedical Toxicology B.Sc. (Co-op available)
- Chemical Physics B.Sc. (Co-op available)
- Physical Science B.Sc.

==== Graduate programs ====
- Biophysics M.Sc., PhD
- Collaborative Specialization in Artificial Intelligence M.Sc., M.A.Sc.
- Collaborative Specialization in Toxicology M.Sc., PhD

== Culture ==
=== Outreach and Community Engagement ===
CCMPS runs Creative Encounters with Science, a STEM Outreach program which began in 1993. The program runs a STEM summer day camp, in-school workshops, after-school clubs, and participates in various on-campus STEM events. As a network member of Actua, a non-profit organization made up of a Canadian network of 40 university and college-based members, Creative Encounters focuses on various initiatives such as Aboriginal Outreach, at-risk youth, and P.A.G.E.S. all-girls programming.

The Department of Physics has a long history of STEM outreach, including a travelling road show that has visited Ontario schools for over 40 years, producing educational content on the Guelph Physics YouTube channel, and requiring a science communication course for undergraduates since 2014, which culminates in an annual STEM Week event. In 2020, faculty members Joanne O’Meara and Orbax Thomas co-founded Royal City Science, a nonprofit that collaborates with the University on outreach initiatives such as a portable planetarium and the Curiosity Carnival, with the long-term goal of establishing a science centre in Guelph.

Alongside the College of Biological Science and the Ontario Agricultural College, CEPS created BattleSTEM (formerly known as the Guelph Science Olympics), in 2009. BattleSTEM is now campus-wide with over 18 different STEM based events, workshops, and activities. In 2023, there was more than 750 students from 26 different high schools across Ontario.

Go CODE Girl is an annual event organized by Guelph Women in Computer Science (GWiCS), Creative Encounters and Women in Engineering, to introduce grades 7-10 girls and gender diverse youth to career possibilities in technology, computing and software engineering.

The recently launched Go PHYS Girl brings in girls and gender-diverse youth from grades 7-10 to learn about the exciting world of physics. This half-day event is a collaborative effort, being organized and run by Women in Engineering (WiE), Royal City Science, Creative Encounters and Guelph Physics.

In July 2023, the Department of Chemistry hosted ChemEd 2023, ChemEd, the largest conference for high school chemistry teachers in North America. The biennial event, first held in 1973 at the University of Waterloo, typically draws several hundred participants. In 2021, the University of Guelph also hosted Best of ChemEd, a virtual mini-conference that engaged over 1,000 educators from 54 countries.

Roboticon is an annual event organized by the University of Guelph's School of Computer Science and the Society of Computing and Information Science where high school students complete computer science challenges designed by undergraduates.

Supermath Day is an annual event, started in 1982, that brings senior-level high school students to campus for mathematics activities and to experience university life. It is held the Tuesday after Thanksgiving.

The University of Guelph hosts Let's Talk Science event, part of a national program that delivers interactive STEM activities in schools and communities. Since 2015, it has organized the annual School of Witchcraft and Wizardry event, which attracts thousands of participants each November.

=== College of Engineering and Physical Sciences Student Council ===
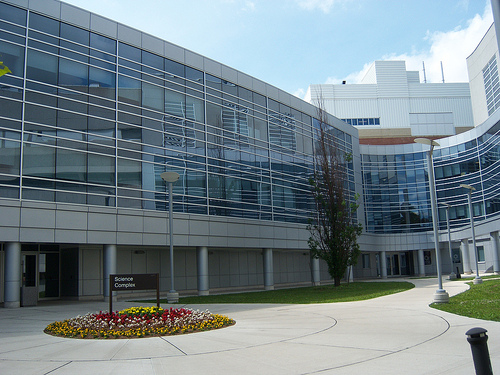
The Science Complex, where CEPSSC meetings are held

The CEPS Student Council (CEPSSC) is a student-run organization that brings CEPS students together for social activities and represents their interests to college leadership, alumni associations, and the general university community. The hub of CEPS is in the Summerlee Science Complex, where weekly meetings occur and offices of council members reside. These elected positions include a president, vice-president (internal affairs), vice-president (communication), vice-president (external affairs), vice-president (finance), and a vice-president (social affairs).

CEPSSC also supports registered academic interest groups within the college. Each club has the right to vote on CEPSSC issues during their weekly meetings.

- Bachelor of Arts and Science Student Association
- Chemistry Club
- Guelph Engineering Society
- Math & Stats Club
- Nanoscience Club
- Physics and Astronomy Club
- Society of Computing & Information Science
- Toxicology Student Association
- Guelph Women in Computer Science

== Notable alumni ==
See List of University of Guelph people.

== See also ==
- University of Guelph
- Guelph, Ontario
- List of Ontario Universities
- University of Guelph Arboretum
- University of Guelph-Humber
- Guelph Gryphons
- Central Student Association
- The Ontarion
