= Bloomfield, Walworth County, Wisconsin =

Bloomfield, Wisconsin
- Town
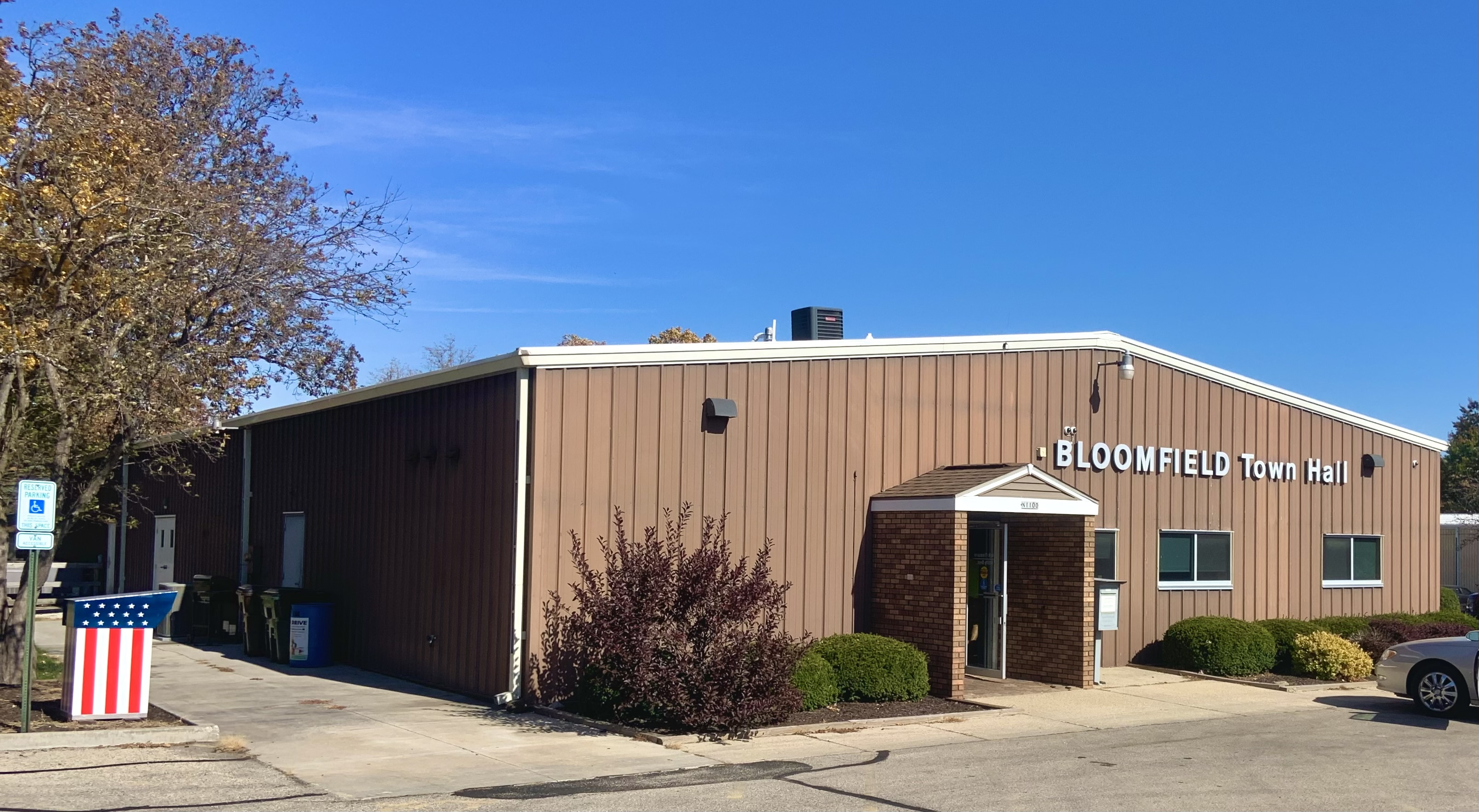
- Bloomfield Town Hall
- Interactive map of Bloomfield, Wisconsin
- Location within Wisconsin
- Coordinates: 42.5111°N 88.3302°W
- Country: United States
- State: Wisconsin
- County: Walworth

Area
  - Total: 1.405 sq mi (3.638 km^{2})
  - Land: 1.405 sq mi (3.638 km^{2})
  - Water: 0 sq mi (0.000 km^{2}) 0.00%
- Elevation: 876 ft (267 m)

Population (2020)
  - Total: 1,778
  - Estimate (2025): 187
  - Density: 1,266/sq mi (488.7/km^{2})
- Time zone: UTC–6 (Central (CST))
  - Summer (DST): UTC–5 (CDT)
- ZIP Codes: 53128, 53147, 53157
- Area code: 262
- FIPS code: 55-127-08275
- GNIS feature ID: 1582832

Bloomfield is a town in Walworth County, Wisconsin, United States. The population was 1,778 as of the 2020 census, and was estimated at 187 in 2025. The village of Bloomfield was formed from part of the town on December 20, 2011. The census-designated place of Lake Ivanhoe and unincorporated community of North Bloomfield are located in the town.

== Geography ==
According to the United States Census Bureau, the town has a total area of 1.405 square miles (3.64 km^{2}), all land.

== Demographics ==
Historical population
Census	Pop.	Note	%±
1850	879		—
1860	1,140		29.7%
1870	1,091		−4.3%
1880	1,097		0.5%
1890	1,197		9.1%
1900	1,314		9.8%
1910	776		−40.9%
1920	725		−6.6%
1930	735		1.4%
1940	971		32.1%
1950	1,442		48.5%
1960	2,154		49.4%
1970	2,481		15.2%
1980	3,277		32.1%
1990	3,723		13.6%
2000	5,537		48.7%
2010	6,278		13.4%
2020	1,778		−71.7%
2025 (est.)	187		−89.5%
U.S. Decennial Census; 2020 Census

According to realtor website Zillow, the average price of a home as of October 31, 2026, in Bloomfield was $488,302.

As of the 2024 American Community Survey, there were 752 estimated households in Bloomfield with an average of 3.09 persons per household. The town has a median household income of $81,912. Approximately 5.2% of the town's population lives at or below the poverty line. Bloomfield has an estimated 75.6% employment rate, with 14.5% of the population holding a bachelor's degree or higher and 81.2% holding a high school diploma. There were 785 housing units at an average density of 15.51 per square mile (5.99/km^{2}).

The top five reported languages (people were allowed to report up to two languages, thus the figures will generally add to more than 100%) were English (66.9%), Spanish (32.2%), Indo-European (0.9%), Asian and Pacific Islander (0.0%), and Other (0.0%).

The median age in the town was 32.8 years.

Bloomfield, Wisconsin – racial and ethnic composition Note: the US Census treats Hispanic/Latino as an ethnic category. This table excludes Latinos from the racial categories and assigns them to a separate category. Hispanics/Latinos may be of any race.
Race / ethnicity (NH = non-Hispanic)	Pop. 1990	Pop. 2000	Pop. 2010	Pop. 2020	% 1990	% 2000	% 2010	% 2020
White alone (NH)	3,559	5,124	5,361	—	95.59%	92.54%	85.39%	—
Black or African American alone (NH)	103	107	84	—	2.77%	1.93%	1.34%	—
Native American or Alaska Native alone (NH)	11	6	21	—	0.30%	0.11%	0.33%	—
Asian alone (NH)	3	18	25	—	0.08%	0.33%	0.40%	—
Pacific Islander alone (NH)	—	2	0	—	—	0.04%	0.00%	—
Other race alone (NH)	0	8	6	—	0.00%	0.14%	0.10%	—
Mixed race or multiracial (NH)	—	52	82	—	—	0.94%	1.31%	—
Hispanic or Latino (any race)	47	220	699	451	1.26%	3.97%	11.13%	25.37%
Total	3,723	5,537	6,278	1,778	100.00%	100.00%	100.00%	100.00%

=== 2020 census ===
As of the 2020 census, there were 1,778 people, 661 households, and 456 families residing in the town. The population density was 35.11 inhabitants per square mile (13.56/km^{2}). There were 711 housing units at an average density of 14.04 per square mile (5.42/km^{2}). The racial makeup of the town was 70.08% White, 3.32% African American, 0.90% Native American, 0.22% Asian, 0.00% Pacific Islander, 13.16% from some other races and 12.32% from two or more races. Hispanic or Latino people of any race were 25.37% of the population.

=== 2010 census ===
As of the 2010 census, there were 6,278 people, 2,292 households, and 1,616 families residing in the town. The population density was 74.60 inhabitants per square mile (28.80/km^{2}). There were 2,747 housing units at an average density of 32.64 per square mile (12.60/km^{2}). The racial makeup of the town was 91.18% White, 1.37% African American, 0.43% Native American, 0.41% Asian, 0.05% Pacific Islander, 4.35% from some other races and 2.21% from two or more races. Hispanic or Latino people of any race were 11.13% of the population.

=== 2000 census ===
As of the 2000 census, there were 5,537 people, 2,067 households, and 1,448 families residing in the town. The population density was 170.12 inhabitants per square mile (65.68/km^{2}). There were 2,476 housing units at an average density of 76.07 per square mile (29.37/km^{2}). The racial makeup of the town was 94.93% White, 1.95% African American, 0.11% Native American, 0.34% Asian, 0.04% Pacific Islander, 1.17% from some other races and 1.46% from two or more races. Hispanic or Latino people of any race were 3.97% of the population.

There were 2,067 households, out of which 35.8% had children under the age of 18 living with them, 54.9% were married couples living together, 10.7% had a female householder with no husband present, and 29.9% were non-families. 24.4% of all households were made up of individuals, and 9.5% had someone living alone who was 65 years of age or older. The average household size was 2.65 and the average family size was 3.16.

In the town, the population was spread out, with 28.6% under the age of 18, 6.3% from 18 to 24, 32.2% from 25 to 44, 21.4% from 45 to 64, and 11.5% who were 65 years of age or older. The median age was 36 years. For every 100 females, there were 98.6 males. For every 100 females age 18 and over, there were 98.3 males.

The median income for a household in the town was $42,232, and the median income for a family was $45,856. Males had a median income of $36,884 versus $25,131 for females. The per capita income for the town was $19,302. About 6.8% of families and 8.3% of the population were below the poverty line, including 9.1% of those under age 18 and 10.2% of those age 65 or over.

== Notable people ==
- Alfred H. Abell, farmer, town official, and Wisconsin State Representative, lived in the town
- Timothy Fellows, farmer, town and county official, and Wisconsin State Representative, who helped the Underground Railroad smuggle escaped slaves out of the country
- Edwin Kull, farmer, educator, and Wisconsin State Representative, was born in the town
