= Edwin Kull =

American politician

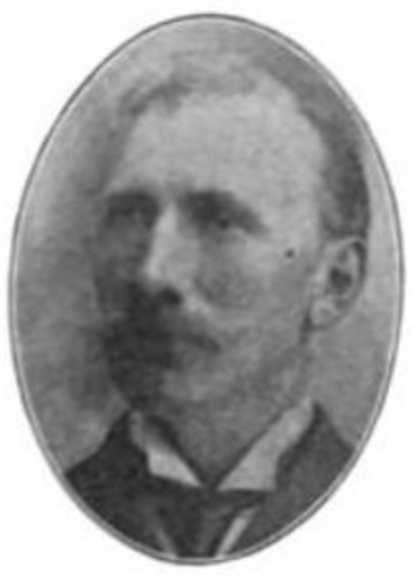

Member of the Wisconsin State Assembly
- In office 1908–1910
- Constituency: Walworth County

Personal details
- Born: Edwin O. Kull; February 7, 1855 Bloomfield, Walworth County, Wisconsin
- Died: August 25, 1941 (aged 86) Elkhorn, Wisconsin
- Party: Republican
- Occupation: Farmer, educator, politician

Edwin O. Kull (February 7, 1855 – August 25, 1941) was an American farmer, educator, and politician. Born in the Town of Bloomfield, Walworth County, Wisconsin, Kull attended Wheaton College. He taught school in both Illinois and Walworth County. Kull had a farm in the town of Bloomfield and was involved with the farmers' cooperative creamery and fire insurance company. He served as justice of the peace, Bloomfield town assessor, and on the Bloomfield town board. In 1909, Kull served in the Wisconsin State Assembly as a Republican. Kull died in Elkhorn, Wisconsin on August 25, 1941.
