= Philip J. Currie Dinosaur Museum =

Paleontology museum in Canada

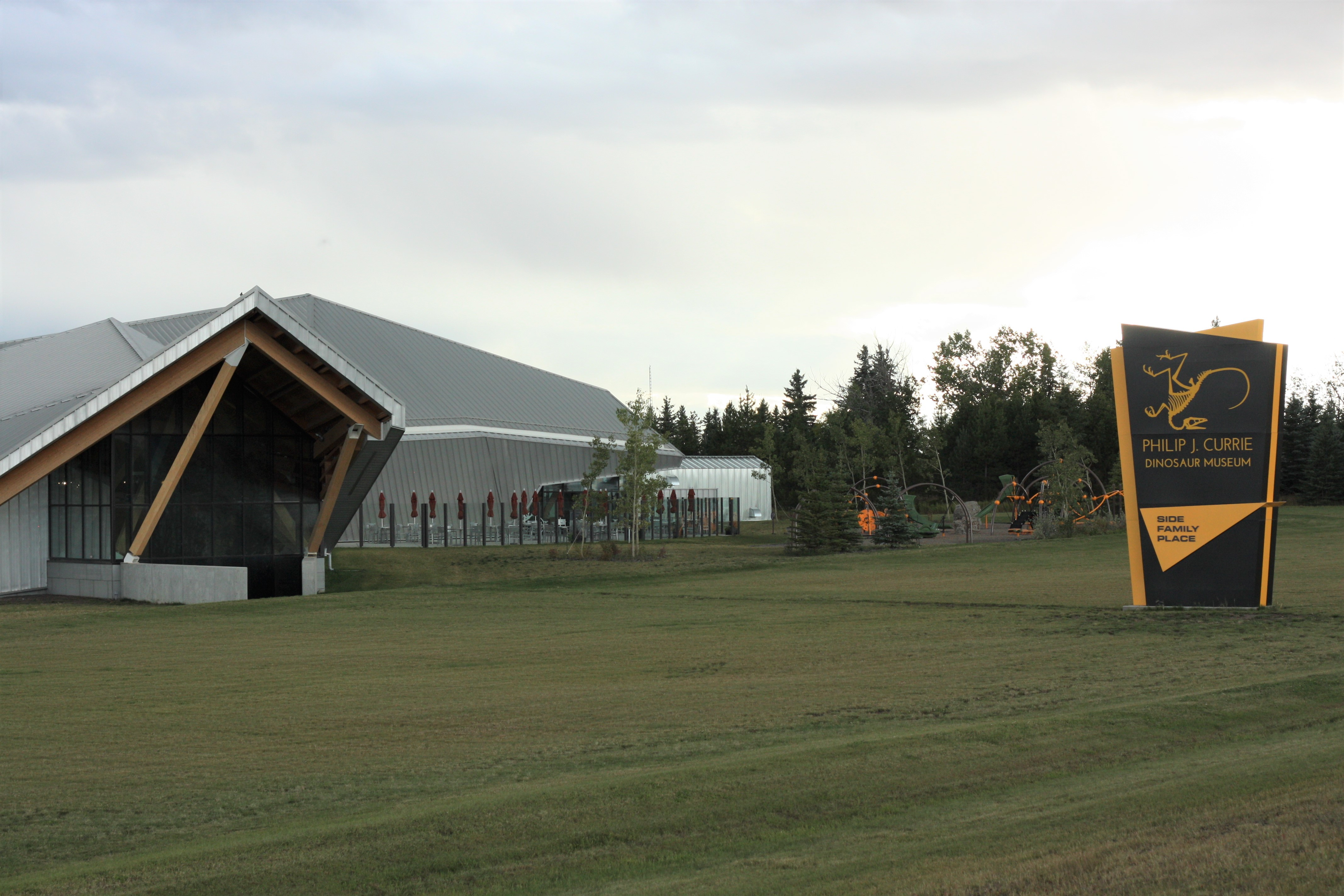
- Exterior

- Location within Alberta
- Established: September 3, 2015
- Location: Wembley, Alberta
- Coordinates: 55.1691°N 119.1354°W
- Type: Palaeontological
- Architect: Teeple Architects
- Owner: County of Grande Prairie
- Website: dinomuseum.ca

The Philip J. Currie Dinosaur Museum is a paleontology museum located in Wembley, Alberta, Canada. The museum is situated within a 3,800-square-metre-building (41,000 sq ft) constructed in 2015, and is named for Canadian paleontologist Philip J. Currie.

== History ==
The Philip J. Currie Dinosaur Museum is located near the Pipestone Creek bonebed, part of the Wapiti Formation which contains fossils from the Late Cretaceous to early Paleocene epoch. The bonebed was discovered by local school teacher Al Lakusta in 1974. Lakusta found the bones belonging to Pachyrhinosaurus, a type of horned dinosaur which was named Pachyrhinosaurus lakustai after Lakusta. The Pipestone Creek bonebed was found to have thousands of fossils and is considered one of the densest fossil sites in the world, and subsequently the area would come to be known as The River of Death. Other fossils found in the bonebed include hadrosaurs, tyrannosaurs, nodosaurs, plesiosaurs, and pterosaurs.

The River of Death and Discovery Dinosaur Museum Society, not-for-profit society formed in 2010, was created with the goal of opening a paleontology museum in the area to showcase the rich history of the area. In 2011 the society changed the name of the proposed museum from River of Death and Discovery Dinosaur Museum to the Philip J. Currie Dinosaur Museum, owing to the support and notoriety of the Canadian paleontologist and concerns over the previous name. Much of the funding for the CA$26-million museum came from the County of Grande Prairie ($7-million, eventually $19.39-million), which owns the building and 10-acre site, as well as the City of Grande Prairie ($3.5-million), Municipal District of Greenview ($250,000), the Government of Alberta ($10-million) and private donations. The county and society commissioned Teeple Architects of Toronto to design the 3,800 square metres (41,000 sq ft) LEED certified building, with an intended opening date of December 2012.

Delays in construction and fundraising caught the attention of Canadian actor and paleontology enthusiast Dan Aykroyd, who organized a two-day celebrity dig at Pipestone Creek Park, ball and private auction to raise the funds necessary. Amongst those in attendance were Aykroyd's wife, American actress Donna Dixon, Saturday Night Live executive producer Lorne Michaels, actor Matthew Gray Gubler and writer Patricia Cornwell. Funding was eventually secured as the price tag rose to $34-million, with the County of Grande Prairie providing additional funding to total $19.39-million, and the museum officially opened on September 3, 2015, and a special ceremony and amber ball was held later in September including Dan Aykroyd, Donna Dixon, Dr. Philip J. Currie and Dr. Eva Kopplehus. In recognition of his support to the museum, the museum's theater was named the Aykroyd Family Theatre, and in partnership with the National Geographic Society, is the only theatre in Canada licensed to show National Geographic films.

Fossils on display in the museum include pachyrhinosaurus lakustai.

The museum is part of a larger plan to make the town a stop for paleontology tourists who also visit the Tumbler Ridge Museum in British Columbia. The museum drew more than 100,000 visitors in its first eleven months of operation, more than double the projections.

In 2014, the museum's building, designed by Teeple Architects, was named by Azure as one of their top ten projects to follow that year. Its 2015 opening was recognized as one of the top museum openings worldwide by Conde Nast Traveler.

== Images ==
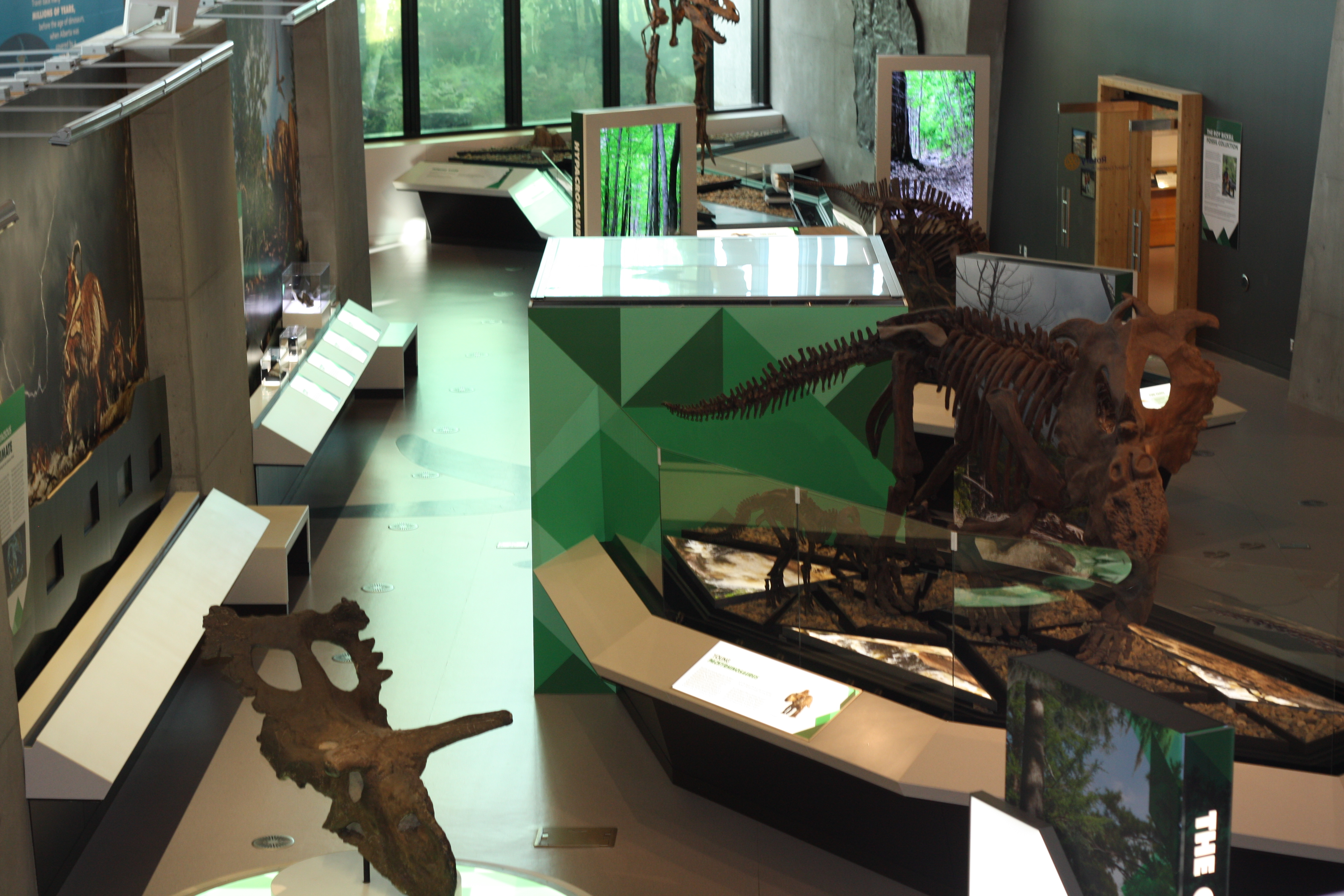
Exhibits at the museum

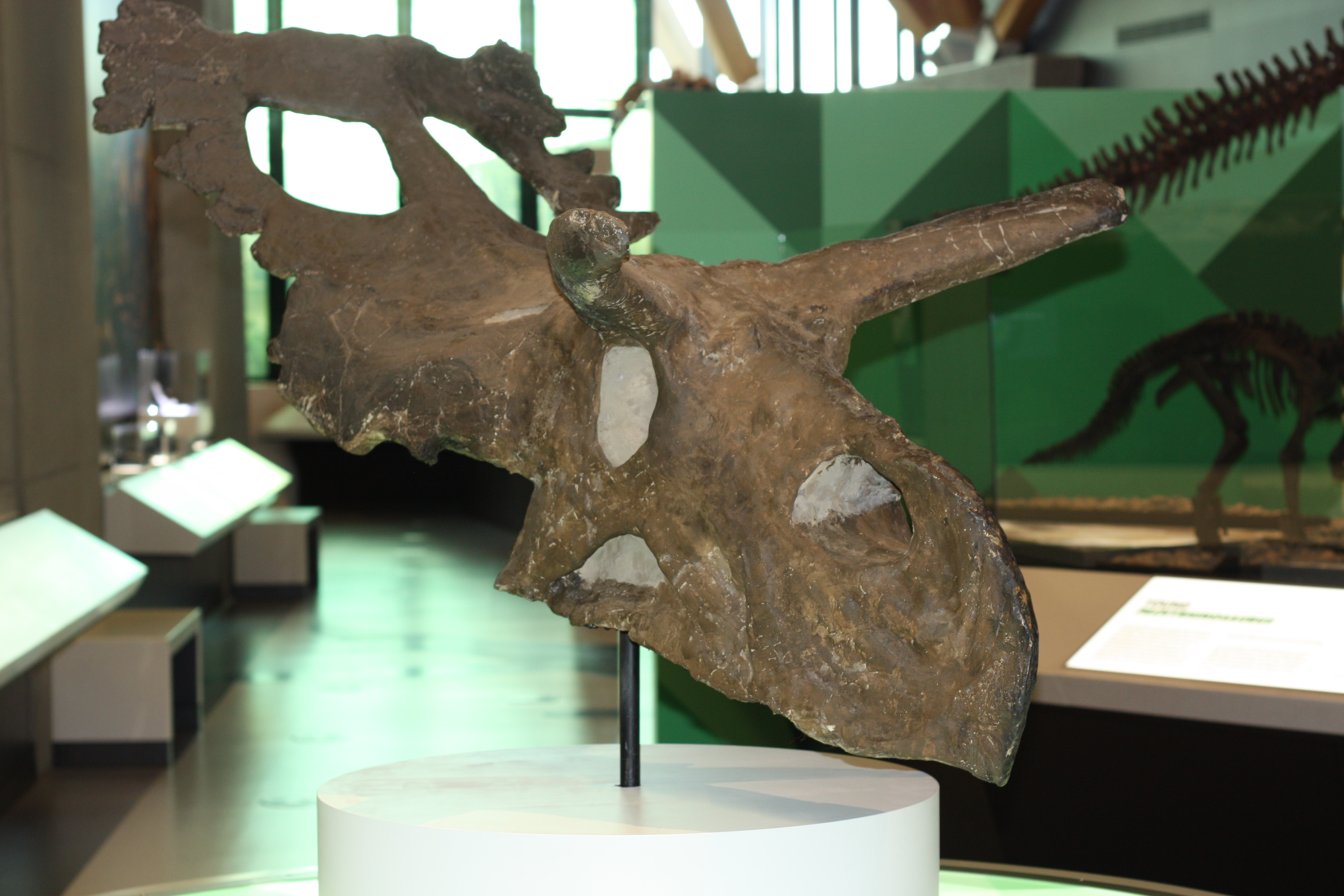
Albertaceratops nesmoi at the museum

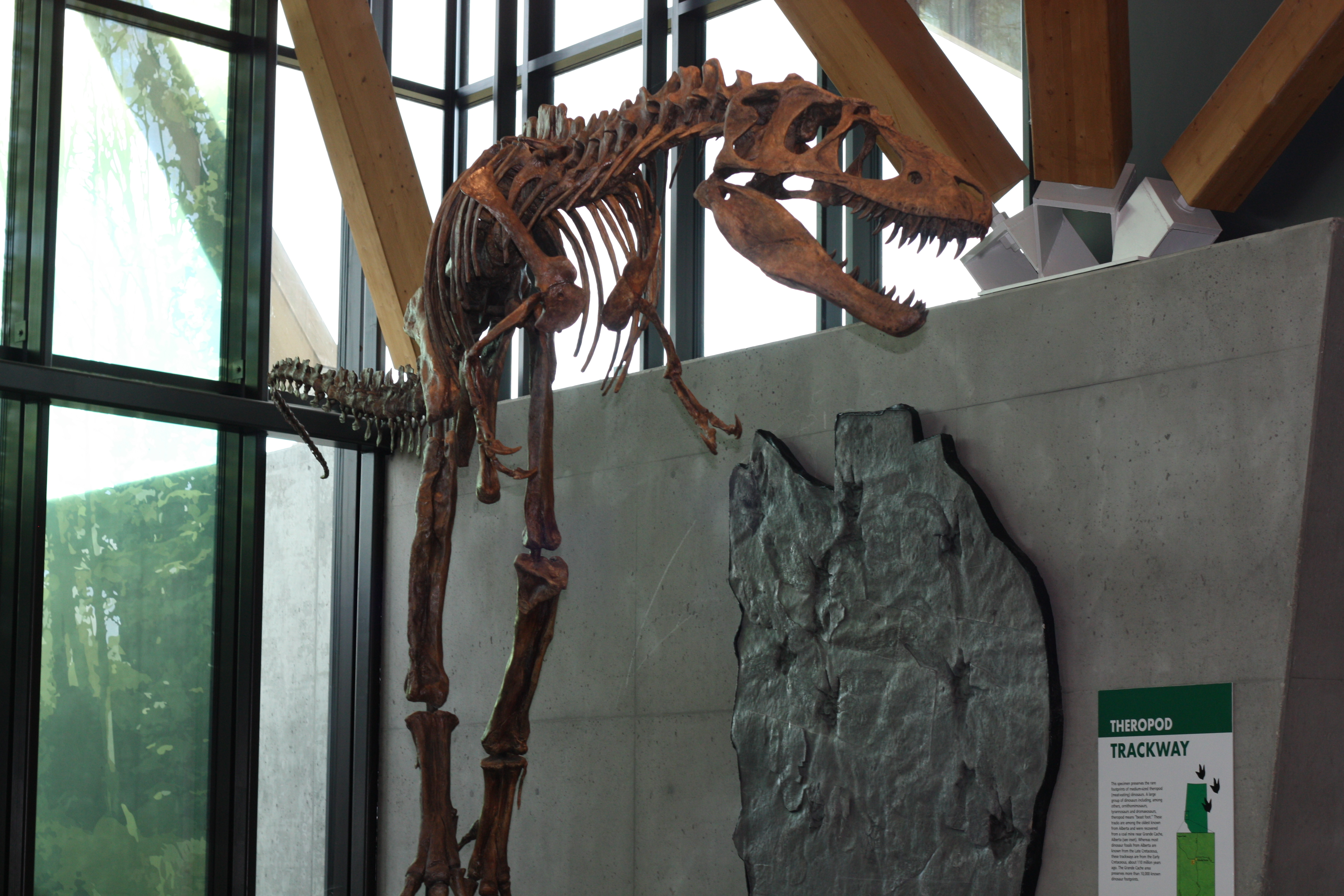
An Gorgosaurus libratus on display

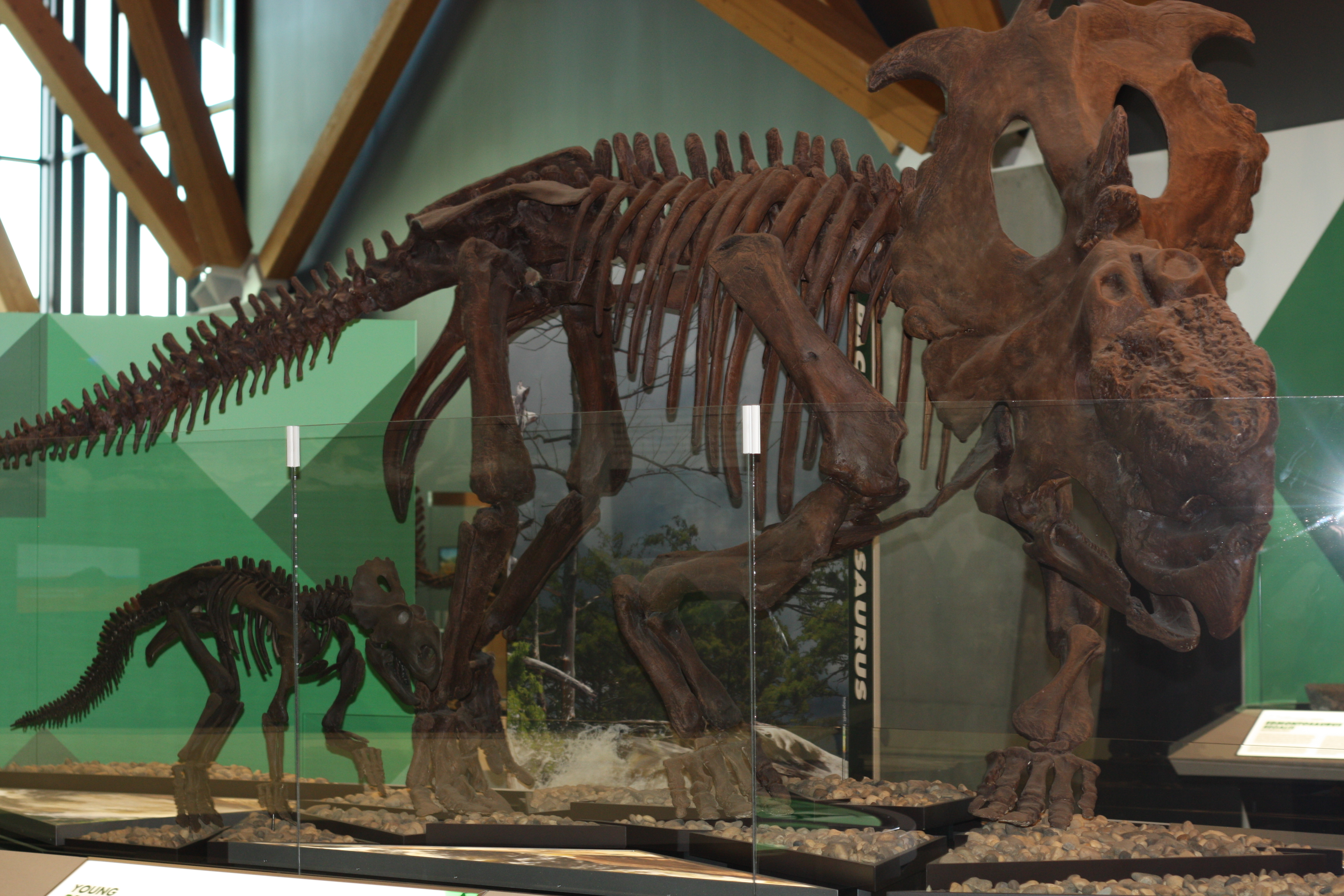
Pachyrhinosaurus lakustai and young Pachyrinosaurus on display

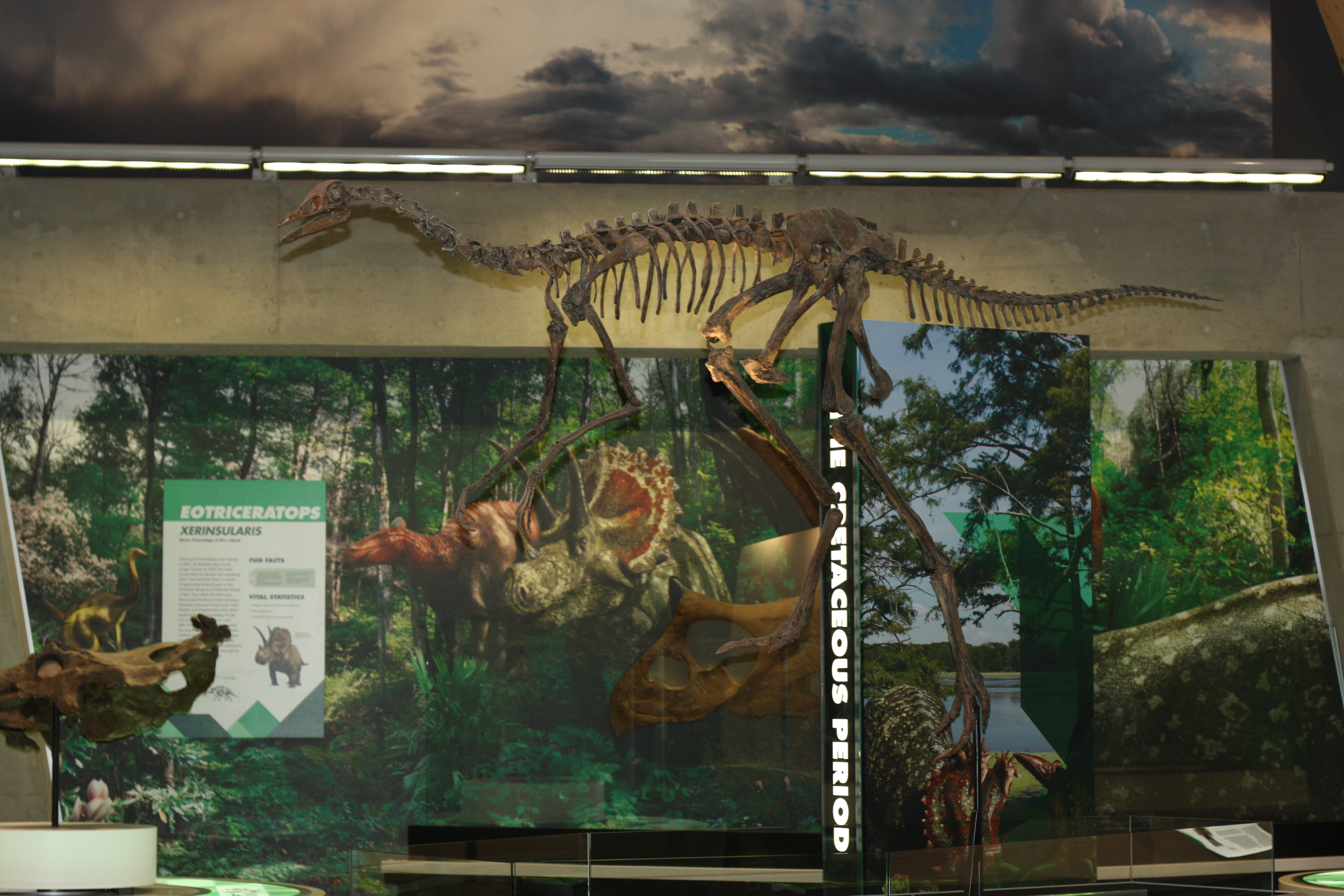
Struthiomimus altus at the museum

== See also ==
- Royal Tyrrell Museum of Palaeontology
- List of museums in Alberta
