= Amos W. Stafford =

American politician

Andrew W. Stafford (1810 in Saratoga County, New York – ?), was a member of the Wisconsin State Assembly. He resided for several years in Ontario County, New York prior to becoming a farmer in Geneva, Wisconsin.

Stafford was married to Ann Sobrina Ellis. They had four children.

== Political career ==
Stafford was a member of the Assembly during the 1872 session. In addition, he was on several occasions a member of the town board (similar to city council) of Geneva. He was a Republican.
