= Alfred H. Abell =

19th century American politician

Member of the Wisconsin State Assembly from the Walworth 1st district
- In office January 1, 1877 – January 7, 1878
- Preceded by: Charles S. Teeple
- Succeeded by: Alma M. Aldrich

Personal details
- Born: Alfred Henry Abell; May 7, 1824 Duanesburg, New York
- Died: May 24, 1882 (aged 58)
- Resting place: Oak Hill Cemetery, Lake Geneva, Wisconsin
- Party: Republican
- Spouse: Marietta Carpenter (died 1882)
- Children: Arthur H. Abell; (b. 1860; died 1860)

Alfred Henry Abell (May 7, 1824 – May 24, 1882) was a member of the Wisconsin State Assembly.

He was born in Duanesburg, New York. Later, he owned farms in Bloomfield, Walworth County, Wisconsin, and Geneva, Wisconsin.

== Political career ==
Abell was a member of the Assembly during the 1877 session. He had already served as Chairman (similar to Mayor) and Supervisor of Bloomfield. Abell was a Republican.
