= Como, Wisconsin =

Census-designated place in Wisconsin, United States

- CDP
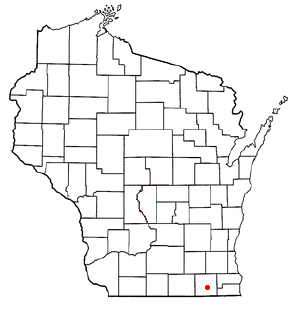
- Location of Como, Wisconsin
- Coordinates: 42°36′34″N 88°29′24″W
- Country: United States
- State: Wisconsin
- County: Walworth

Area
  - Total: 3.5 sq mi (9.1 km^{2})
  - Land: 3.0 sq mi (7.8 km^{2})
  - Water: 0.50 sq mi (1.3 km^{2})
- Elevation: 915 ft (279 m)

Population (2020)
  - Total: 2,356
  - Density: 780/sq mi (300/km^{2})
- Time zone: UTC-6 (Central (CST))
  - Summer (DST): UTC-5 (CDT)
- Area code: 262
- FIPS code: 55-16575
- GNIS feature ID: 1563298

Como is a census-designated place (CDP) in the town of Geneva, Walworth County, Wisconsin, United States. The population was 2,356 at the 2020 census.

== Geography ==
Como is located at 42°36′34″N 88°29′24″W (42.609428, -88.489993).

According to the United States Census Bureau, the CDP has a total area of 3.5 square miles (9.1 km^{2}), of which 3.0 square miles (7.8 km^{2}) is land and 0.5 square mile (1.3 km^{2}) (14.16%) is water.

== Demographics ==
Historical population
Census	Pop.	Note	%±
2000	1,870		—
2010	2,631		40.7%
2020	2,356		−10.5%
U.S. Decennial Census

At the 2000 census there were 1,870 people, 786 households, and 510 families in the CDP. The population density was 617.0 people per square mile (238.3/km^{2}). There were 1,214 housing units at an average density of 400.6/sq mi (154.7/km^{2}). The racial makeup of the CDP was 93.42% White, 0.70% African American, 0.11% Native American, 0.16% Asian, 4.06% from other races, and 1.55% from two or more races. Hispanic or Latino of any race were 7.01%.

Of the 786 households 26.1% had children under the age of 18 living with them, 52.0% were married couples living together, 7.1% had a female householder with no husband present, and 35.1% were non-families. 28.2% of households were one person and 10.7% were one person aged 65 or older. The average household size was 2.38 and the average family size was 2.87.

The age distribution was 22.2% under the age of 18, 6.6% from 18 to 24, 30.0% from 25 to 44, 24.7% from 45 to 64, and 16.5% 65 or older. The median age was 40 years. For every 100 females, there were 104.1 males. For every 100 females age 18 and over, there were 102.4 males.

The median household income was $43,750 and the median family income was $49,395. Males had a median income of $30,469 versus $21,747 for females. The per capita income for the CDP was $22,780. About 3.0% of families and 3.1% of the population were below the poverty line, including 9.0% of those under age 18 and 1.3% of those age 65 or over.
