= Amzy Merriam =

American politician

Amzy Merriam was a member of the Wisconsin State Assembly during the 1871 session. Merriam resided in Geneva, Wisconsin. He was a Republican.
