= Early Learning Centre (building) =

Childcare facility at the University of Toronto St. George

Coordinates: 43.6639°N 79.4011°W

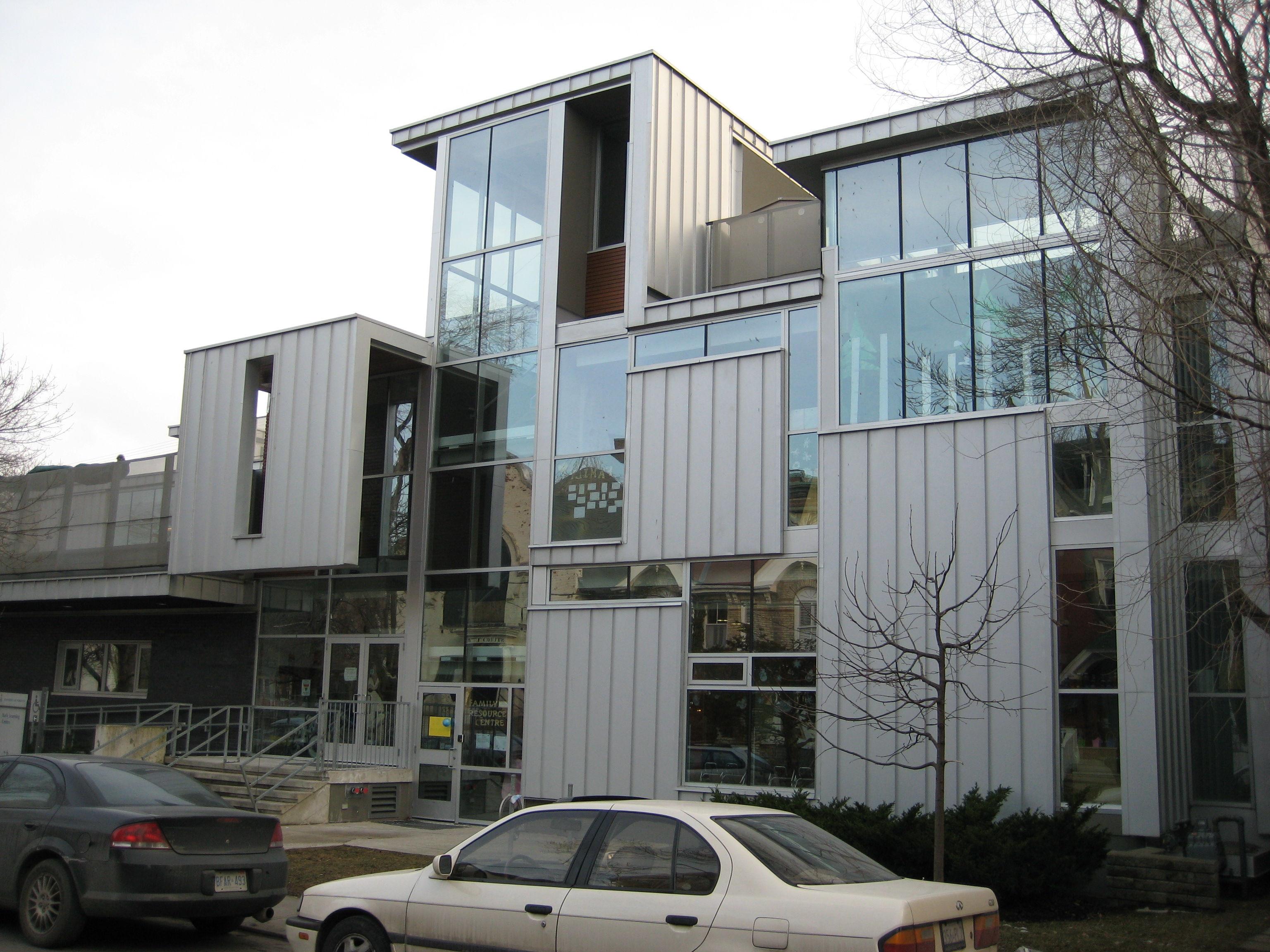
The Early Learning Centre, Glen Morris location

The Early Learning Centre (Glen Morris location) is a childcare space at the University of Toronto St. George in Toronto, Ontario, Canada. The building, designed by Teeple Architects in 2003, is intended for the children of the University of Toronto faculty and students. It is noted for its large open spaces, big windows, and clear connections between rooms that allow for children's interaction with the exterior environment and with each other.

The building is made up of multi-levels, leaving some areas to be double-height, creating loft and pit-like spaces for play. The different rooms are mainly centred on a ramp, which is used for circulation. There are lightwells that run along the double-atrium ramp that help to brighten up the spaces. The whole building was designed around a large walnut tree, which currently is placed in the back of the building. The exterior of the building is made up of large Gavalume panels, and light green-tinted transparent glass windows. The entire building has a planar profile, is very linear, and does not consist of any curvy or irregular shapes. The architects designed it to not stand out among its surrounding buildings; though the principal materials are different from the residential building on the site, the architects conveyed some of the material elements of the brick by using it along the main entrance ramp of the centre.

== See also ==
- Child care in Canada
- List of University of Toronto buildings
