= Charles S. Teeple =

19th century American politician

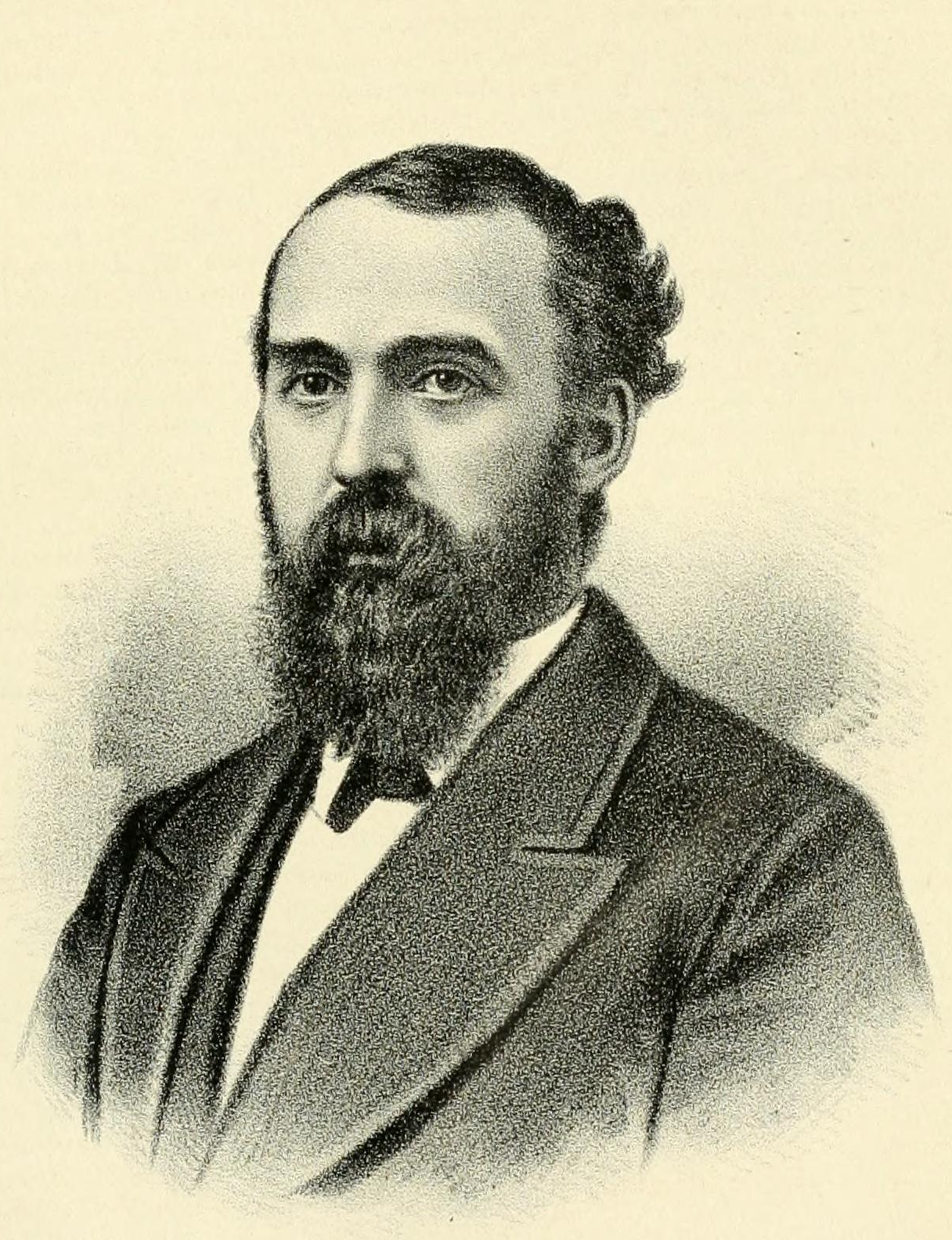
- Portrait from History of Walworth County, Wisconsin (1882)

Member of the Wisconsin State Assembly from the Walworth 1st district
- In office January 3, 1876 – January 1, 1877
- Preceded by: Elijah Mattison Sharp
- Succeeded by: Alfred H. Abell

Personal details
- Born: February 10, 1830 Esperance, New York, U.S.
- Died: November 29, 1881 (aged 51)
- Resting place: Darien Cemetery, Darien, Wisconsin
- Party: Republican
- Spouse: Emily Enders (m. 1858)
- Children: Kate E.; Matie; Maude; Charles S. Jr.

Charles Sloan Teeple (February 10, 1830 – November 29, 1881) was an American businessman and Republican politician. He served one term in the Wisconsin State Assembly, representing southwest Walworth County

== Biography ==
Teeple was born on February 10, 1830, in Esperance (village), New York. In 1856, he settled in Darien (town), Wisconsin. He was a merchant by trade. Teeple died in 1881.

== Political career ==
Teeple was a member of the Assembly during the 1876 session. Other positions he held include Postmaster of Darien. He was a Republican.
