= Geneva, Wisconsin =

- Town
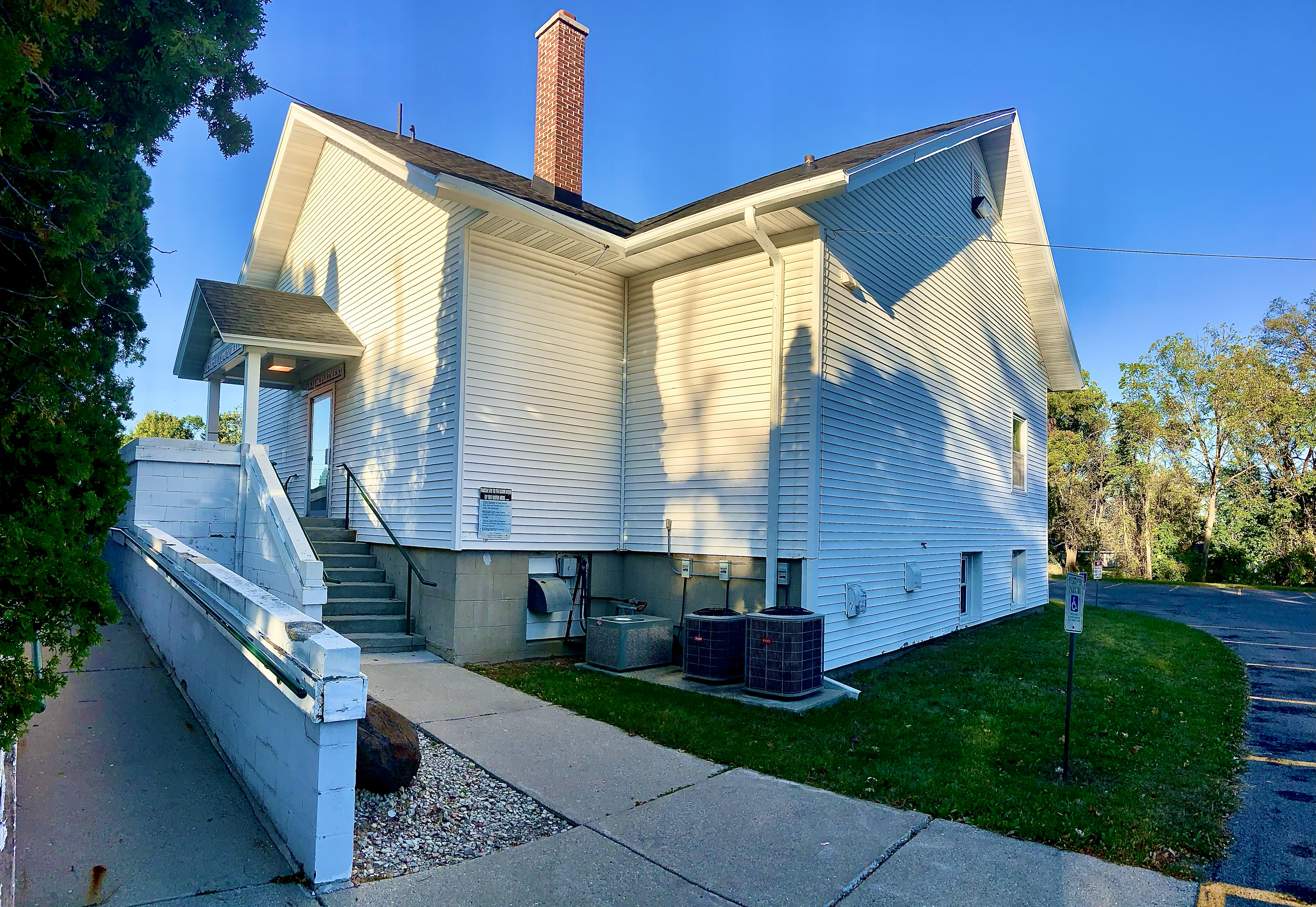
- Town hall in Como

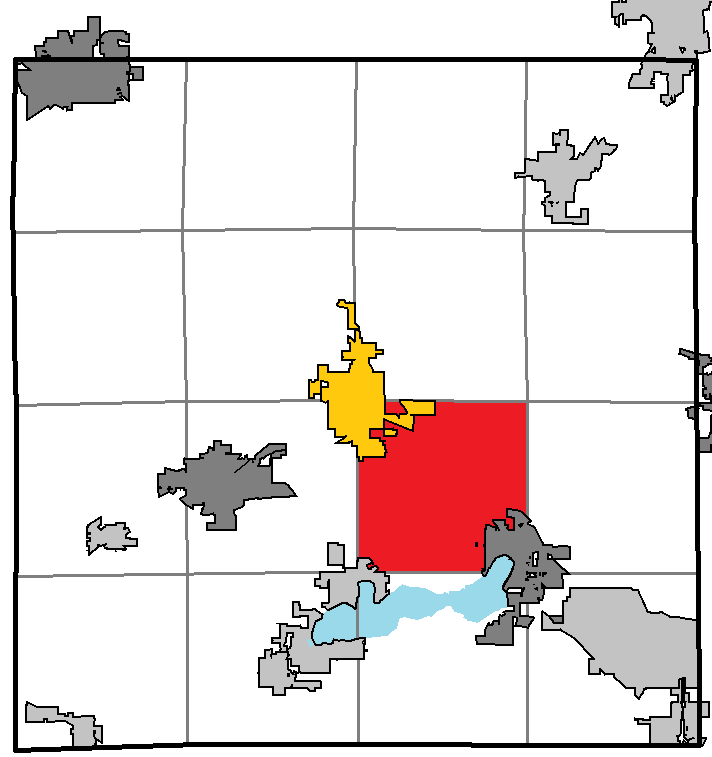
- Location of Geneva, within Walworth County

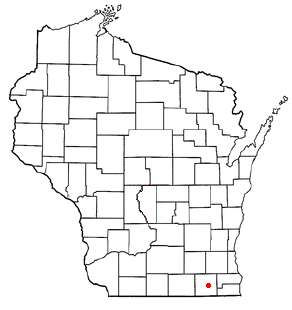
- Location of Geneva, Wisconsin
- Coordinates: 42°36′43″N 88°29′18″W
- Country: United States
- State: Wisconsin
- County: Walworth

Area
  - Total: 30.8 sq mi (79.8 km^{2})
  - Land: 29.3 sq mi (75.8 km^{2})
  - Water: 1.5 sq mi (4.0 km^{2})
- Elevation: 1,014 ft (309 m)

Population (2020)
  - Total: 5,390
  - Density: 140/sq mi (54.1/km^{2})
- Time zone: UTC-6 (Central (CST))
  - Summer (DST): UTC-5 (CDT)
- Area code: 262
- FIPS code: 55-28550
- GNIS feature ID: 1583261

Geneva is a town in Walworth County, Wisconsin, United States. The population was 5,390 at the 2020 census. The census-designated place of Como is located in the town. The unincorporated community of Lake Como is also located in the town.

== Geography ==
According to the United States Census Bureau, the town has a total area of 30.8 square miles (79.8 km^{2}), of which 29.3 square miles (75.8 km^{2}) is land and 1.5 square miles (4.0 km^{2}) (4.97%) is water, primarily consisting of Lake Como and Como Creek.

== Demographics ==
As of the census of 2000, there were 4,099 people, 1,660 households, and 1,163 families residing in the town. The population density was 140.0 people per square mile (54.1/km^{2}). There were 2,826 housing units at an average density of 96.6 per square mile (37.3/km^{2}). The racial makeup of the town was 95.46% White, 0.61% African American, 0.10% Native American, 0.54% Asian, 2.49% from other races, and 0.81% from two or more races. Hispanic or Latino of any race were 4.66% of the population.

There were 1,660 households, out of which 27.7% had children under the age of 18 living with them, 59.0% were married couples living together, 6.6% had a female householder with no husband present, and 29.9% were non-families. 24.7% of all households were made up of individuals, and 8.9% had someone living alone who was 65 years of age or older. The average household size was 2.45 and the average family size was 2.89.

In the town, the population was spread out, with 22.9% under the age of 18, 5.5% from 18 to 24, 27.2% from 25 to 44, 27.9% from 45 to 64, and 16.5% who were 65 years of age or older. The median age was 42 years. For every 100 females, there were 103.7 males. For every 100 females age 18 and over, there were 102.2 males.

The median income for a household in the town was $49,504, and the median income for a family was $57,628. Males had a median income of $33,775 versus $22,144 for females. The per capita income for the town was $25,021. About 3.2% of families and 4.6% of the population were below the poverty line, including 9.8% of those under age 18 and 2.3% of those age 65 or over.

== Government ==
The town board consists of a chairman and four supervisors elected at large for two-year terms. Elections for the chairman and two supervisors are held in odd-numbered years, and for two supervisors in even-numbered years. The other town-wide elective positions are town clerk/treasurer and municipal judge.

== Notable people ==
- Alfred H. Abell, Wisconsin State Representative, lived in Geneva
- John W. Boyd, Wisconsin State Senator, lived in Geneva
- Experience Estabrook, Attorney General of Wisconsin, lived in Geneva
- Thomas W. Hill, farmer and legislator, one of the first elected officials of Geneva
- Amzy Merriam, Wisconsin State Representative, lived in Geneva
- Charles Palmetier, Wisconsin State Senator, lived in Geneva
- Benoni Reynolds, Wisconsin State Senator, mayor of Geneva
- Amos W. Stafford, Wisconsin State Representative, lived in and was a member of the town board of Geneva
- Charles Simeon Taylor, lawyer and legislator, born in Geneva
- William H. H. Wroe, Wisconsin State Representative, lived in Geneva
