= Perimeter Institute for Theoretical Physics =

Research institute in Waterloo, Canada

Coordinates: 43.46535°N 80.52800°W

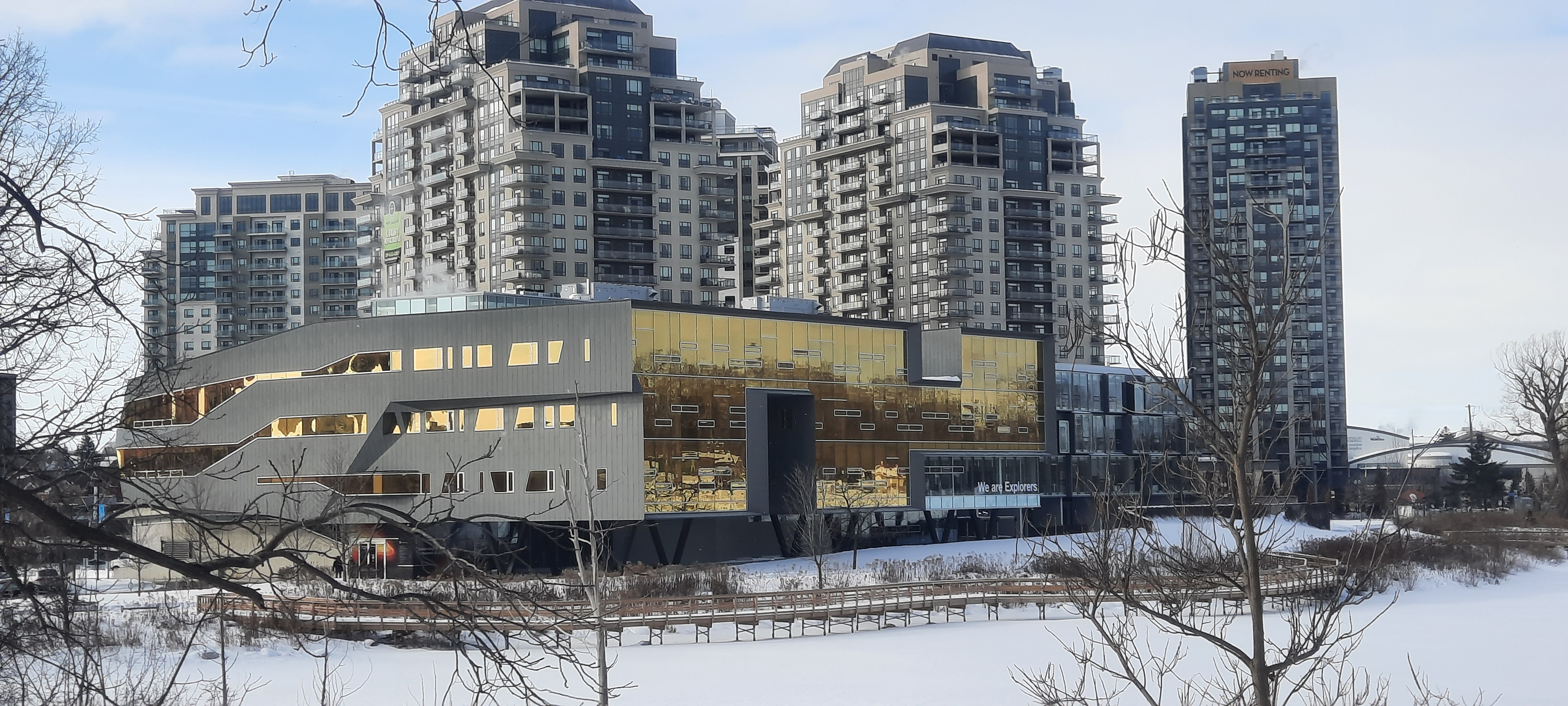
- Established: 1999
- Type: Research institute
- Location: Waterloo, Ontario, Canada
- Director: Marcela Carena
- Website: www.perimeterinstitute.ca

Perimeter Institute for Theoretical Physics (PI, Perimeter, PITP) is an independent research centre in foundational theoretical physics located in Waterloo, Ontario, Canada. It was founded in 1999. The institute's founding and major benefactor is Canadian entrepreneur and philanthropist Mike Lazaridis.

The original building, designed by Saucier + Perrotte, opened in 2004 and was awarded a Governor General's Medal for Architecture in 2006. The Stephen Hawking Centre, designed by Teeple Architects, was opened in 2011 and was LEED Silver certified in 2015.

In addition to research, Perimeter also provides scientific training and educational outreach activities to the general public. This is done in part through Perimeter's Educational Outreach team.

== History ==
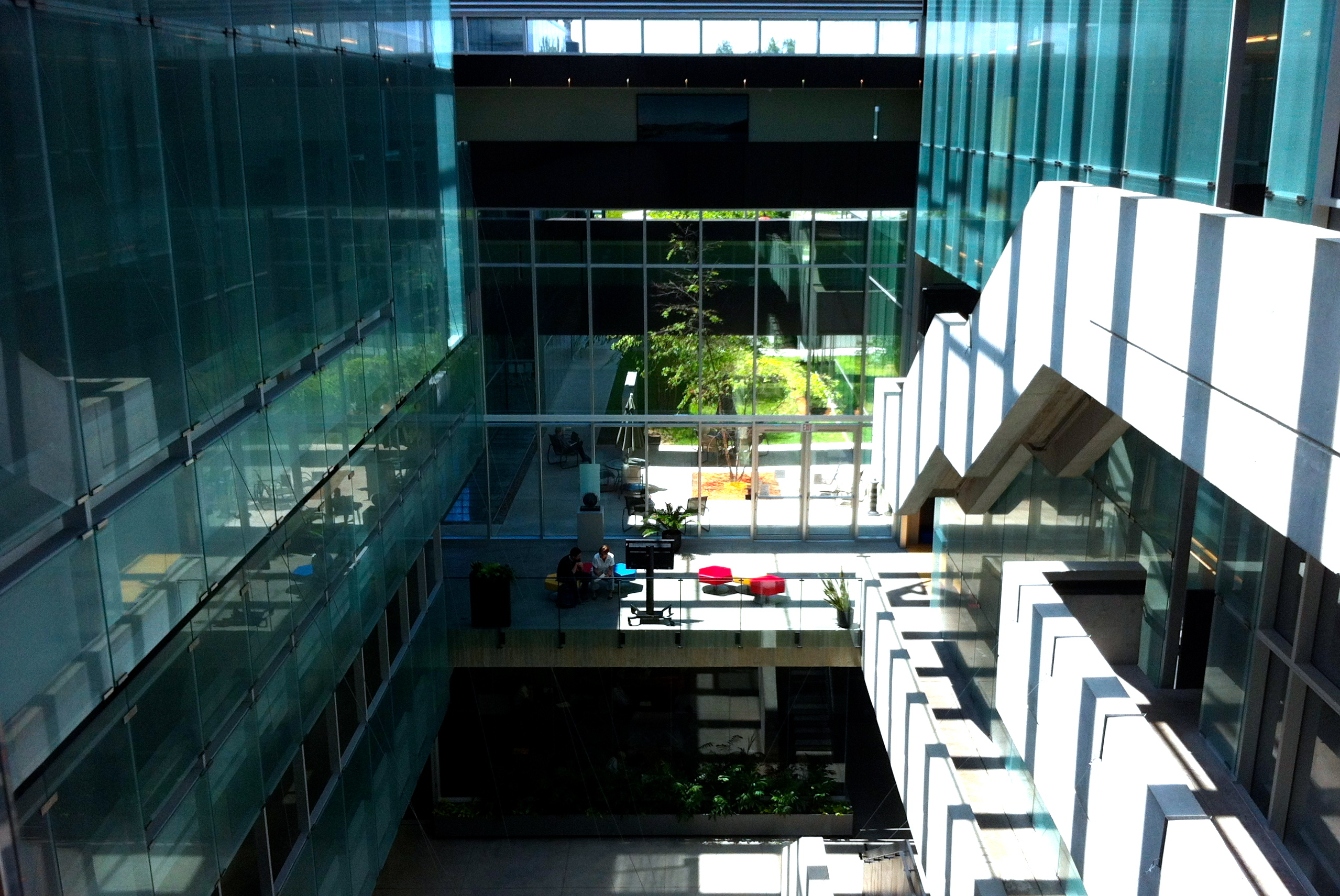
Inside the Perimeter Institute

In 1999, Howard Burton—who had a PhD in theoretical physics from the University of Waterloo—emailed Mike Lazaridis along with 20 CEOs in an attempt to leave his Wall Street job. Lazaridis then pitched the idea of the Perimeter Institute to Burton as he wanted to use his BlackBerry wealth for a philanthropic endeavour. Lazaridis' initial donation of $100 million was announced on October 23, 2000, believed to be the biggest private donation in Canadian history to that point. Jim Balsille and Doug Fregin each donated $10 million. The city of Waterloo offered four sites of land for free; Lazaridis chose the former site of the Waterloo Memorial Arena (near Uptown Waterloo).

Research operations began in 2001, in a temporary site in a nearby post office. Burton became the institute's founding director. The permanent building's construction finished in 2004. The Ontario budget, announced in March 2006, included a commitment to provide $50 million in funding to PI from the Ministry of Research and Innovation.

In May 2008, Dr. Neil Turok, a cosmologist, was appointed as Perimeter Institute's second director replacing Burton. Lazaridis donated a subsequent $50 million on June 4, 2008. In November 2008, it was announced that physicist Stephen Hawking would take the position of Distinguished Visiting Research Chair, a visiting position, at the institute.

Designed by Teeple Architects, a new 5,000 m^{2} (55,000 sq ft) expansion, the Stephen Hawking Centre at Perimeter Institute, was completed in September 2011. The centre's grand opening was in September 2011 and included a video greeting from Hawking, who rarely traveled due to disability. This was the first-ever Gold Seal-managed project in Ontario, it attained LEED Silver certification in 2015.

On February 28, 2019, Robert Myers was appointed as the third director of the Perimeter Institute. On Nov 4, 2024, Marcela Carena was announced as the fourth director.

== Design ==
The Institute was designed by Montréal-based architectural firm Saucier + Perrotte. A concrete stairwell in the building's atrium was designed by Blackwell Engineers. The Institute's front aluminum wall is black with small windows to represent a blackboard. There are wooden fireplaces and blackboards throughout the building. Writing for The Globe and Mail, architecture critic Lisa Rochon praised the Institute's "seamless connections" between the building's interior and exterior and said the building is about "the flow of light and the directions we can take". Rochon described the building as modernism, and cited Tadao Ando as an influence.

== Research ==
Perimeter's research encompasses nine fields:

- Cosmology
- Mathematical physics
- Particle physics
- Quantum fields and strings
- Quantum foundations
- Quantum gravity
- Quantum information
- Quantum matter
- Strong gravity

== Programs ==
=== Perimeter Institute Recorded Seminar Archive (PIRSA) ===
An extensive, up-to-date archive of the institute's varied research activities is readily available to the public via the internet. The Perimeter Institute Recorded Seminar Archive (PIRSA), is a permanent, free, searchable, and citable archive of recorded seminars, conferences, workshops and outreach events. Seminars with video and timed presentation materials can be accessed on-demand in Windows and Flash formats together with MP3 audio files and PDFs of the supporting materials. The PIRSA project is enlarged by the creation of SciVideos (See below).

=== SciVideos ===
After more than 13,000 talks uploaded to PIRSA, Perimeter Institute created in 2020 a new public video archive called SciTalks, which was later renamed to SciVideos, with the support of the Simons Foundations. It is a meta-repository search tool of scientific talks beyond what is produced at PI, including institutions such as CERN, Simons Institute for the Theory of Computing, ICTP and ICTP-SAIFR. As a meta-repository, SciVideos only stores metadata and links related to the videos, which are stored in other databases.

== Educational outreach ==
Perimeter's educational outreach team's activities include a monthly public lecture series, a two-week summer camp for the world's top science students, a series of in-class resources, week-long professional development workshops for science teachers, cultural activities with local and international artists, an online archive of educational resources, an extensive network of science teachers to share content across Canada, and many other special events and science festivals contributing to physics outreach. Perimeter Institute operates an international outreach program.

The annual EinsteinPlus summer school for high school physics teachers is held for one week each summer. The International Summer School for Young Physicists (ISSYP) is a physics camp for high school students. It brings approximately 20 Canadian students and 20 International students aged 16–18 to Perimeter for two weeks each year.

=== Public lectures series ===
Perimeter Institute has welcomed a number of very prominent scientists to deliver lectures on a wide variety of subjects. Lecturers have included: Freeman Dyson, Gerard ‘t Hooft, Jay Ingram, Seth Lloyd, Jay Melosh, Sir Roger Penrose, Michael Peskin, Leonard Susskind, Frank Wilczek and Anton Zeilinger.

=== BrainSTEM: Your Future is Now ===
This festival connected technological innovations to the scientific breakthroughs that make them possible. The festival, held September 30 to October 6, 2013, featured science-centre styled exhibits, special presentations, public lectures, Science in the Club events and insider-tours of the Perimeter Institute. Webcast Public Lectures featured James Grime, Ray Laflamme and Lucy Hawking.

=== Quantum to Cosmos: Ideas for the Future festival ===
Held in October, 2009, the Quantum to Cosmos: Ideas for the Future festival (Q2C Festival) was a science outreach event held in Canada. The festival included events and activities spanning: lectures, panel discussions, pub talks, cultural activities, a PI documentary premiere (The Quantum Tamers: Revealing Our Weird and Wired Future), sci-fi film festival, an art exhibit and the hugely popular Physica Phantastica exhibit centre, a 460-square-metre (5,000 sq ft) space filled with demonstrations, hands-on activities, experiments and an immersive 3D tour of the universe narrated by Stephen Hawking.

The Q2C Festival attracted some 40,000 attendees (including over 6,000 in the secondary school program that brought students from Ontario and New York State and nearly one million viewers – and counting – through online streaming, video-on-demand services and special television broadcasts. Special editions of TVO’s “The Agenda with Steve Paikin", filmed live in PI's Atrium in Waterloo attracted hundreds of thousands of viewers from across Canada with just five broadcasts.

== Training ==
=== Joint masters-level program ===
In partnership with the University of Waterloo, PI conducts Perimeter Scholars International (PSI), a master's level course in theoretical physics. The 10-month course was inaugurated in August 2009, and admits around 30 scholars per year. Students admitted (on average 3% of all applicants) receive full scholarships and living expenses. The master's degree itself is issued by the University of Waterloo.

=== Doctoral studies ===
Perimeter Institute for Theoretical Physics also hosts PhD students wishing to pursue full-time graduate studies under the supervision of a PI faculty member. PhD students receive their doctoral degrees from a university partner, such as the University of Waterloo.

=== Courses ===
Perimeter Institute offers a number of planned courses each year, including cross-listed programs with universities and mini-courses given by PI faculty, associate faculty and visiting researchers. The courses are made available to all students enrolled in surrounding universities. The popular courses are attended by students from University of Waterloo, University of Western Ontario, McMaster University, University of Guelph, University of Toronto, York University, and other centres.

== See also ==
- Institute for Theoretical Physics (disambiguation)
- Center for Theoretical Physics (disambiguation)
