= Wembley, Alberta =

Wembley
- Town
- Town of Wembley
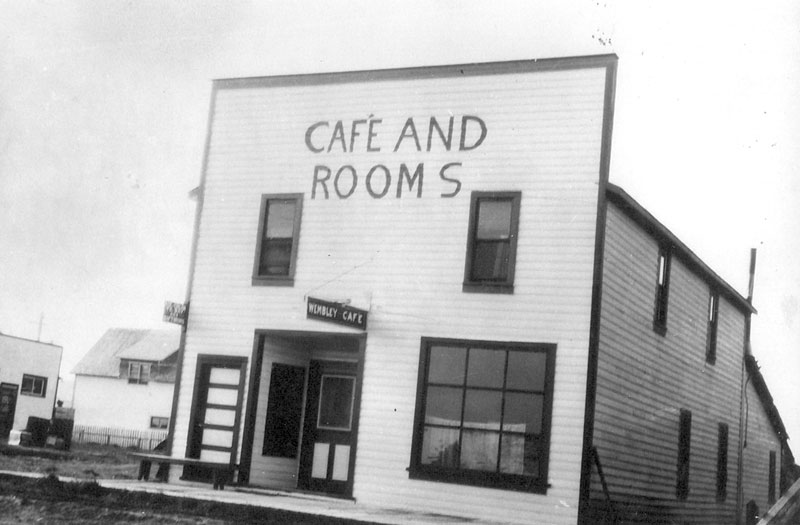
- Wong's Café, c. 1935

- Logo

- Location in the County of Grande Prairie No. 1

- Location in Alberta
- Coordinates: 55°09′26″N 119°08′21″W
- Country: Canada
- Province: Alberta
- Region: Northern Alberta
- Planning region: Upper Peace
- Municipal district: County of Grande Prairie No. 1
- Incorporated
  - Village: January 3, 1928
  - Town: August 1, 1980

Government
  - Mayor: Kelly Peterson
  - Governing body: Wembley Town Council

Area (2021)
  - Land: 4.74 km^{2} (1.83 sq mi)
- Elevation: 724 m (2,375 ft)

Population (2021)
  - Total: 1,432
  - Density: 302.1/km^{2} (782/sq mi)
- Time zone: UTC−06:00 (Alberta Time)
- Highways: Highway 43; Highway 724
- Waterways: Wapiti River; Saskatoon Lake
- Website: Official website

Wembley is a town in northern Alberta, Canada. It is approximately 23 km (14 mi) west of Grande Prairie at the junction of Highway 43 and Highway 724.

== History ==
Land around Wembley was surveyed for homesteads in 1909, settlers beginning to arrive in 1910. The railroad survey was completed from Grande Prairie to Pouce Coupe in 1916 and the townsite of Wembley was surveyed in 1923. The railway arrived in 1924.

The present town-site is four and a half miles south of the original hamlet of Lake Saskatoon and when the railway arrived in 1924 many buildings were hauled over the four and one half miles of snow-covered trails from Lake Saskatoon to their new foundations in Wembley. The name Wembley was chosen by the Lake Saskatoon Board of Trade at the time of the British Empire Exposition at Wembley in England.

The post office opened in November 1924, the first postmaster being RB Sinclair.

Wembley reached village status January 3, 1928, and town status August 1, 1980.

== Demographics ==
Federal census population history
Year	Pop.	±%
1931	183	—
1936	173	−5.5%
1941	188	+8.7%
1946	237	+26.1%
1951	251	+5.9%
1956	272	+8.4%
1961	303	+11.4%
1966	299	−1.3%
1971	372	+24.4%
1976	507	+36.3%
1981	1,169	+130.6%
1986	1,208	+3.3%
1991	1,347	+11.5%
1996	1,441	+7.0%
2001	1,497	+3.9%
2006	1,443	−3.6%
2011	1,383	−4.2%
2016	1,516	+9.6%
2021	1,432	−5.5%
Source: Statistics Canada

In the 2021 Census of Population conducted by Statistics Canada, the Town of Wembley had a population of 1,432 living in 550 of its 616 total private dwellings, a change of −5.5% from its 2016 population of 1,516. With a land area of 4.74 km^{2} (1.83 sq mi), it had a population density of 302.1/km^{2} (782.5/sq mi) in 2021.

In the 2016 Census of Population conducted by Statistics Canada, the Town of Wembley recorded a population of 1,516 living in 565 of its 618 total private dwellings, a 9.6% change from its 2011 population of 1,383. With a land area of 4.75 km^{2} (1.83 sq mi), it had a population density of 319.2/km^{2} (826.6/sq mi) in 2016.

The Town of Wembley's 2012 municipal census counted a population of 1,410.

== See also ==
- List of communities in Alberta
- List of towns in Alberta
- Philip J. Currie Dinosaur Museum
