= Pat Hanson =

Canadian architect

- Education: B.A University of Manitoba M.Arch University of Manitoba
- Occupation: Principal Architect gh3
- Notable work: O-day'min Park
- Website: gh3.ca

Pat Hanson, AAA, OAA, FRAIC, is a Canadian architect based in Toronto and a founding principal of gh3, an architecture practice which she co-leads with Raymond Chow. Hanson is a founding member of the Women's Architectural League.

== Career ==
After completing a Bachelor of Fine Arts and a Masters of Architecture from the University of Manitoba, Hanson went on to practice with several architecture firms in Toronto primarily. She then served as an adjunct professor at the University of Toronto and the University of Waterloo, and is currently an active member of the Waterfront Design Review Panel. Formerly she served on the advisory board of Building Equality in Architecture Toronto (BEAT).

Under Hanson's leadership, her firm gh3, has won seven Governor General's Medals in Architecture. In 2024, Hanson was a recipient of the King Charles III Coronation Medal for services to architecture. In 2026, Hanson was awarded the Royal Architectural Institute of Canada's Gold Medal.

== Notable works ==
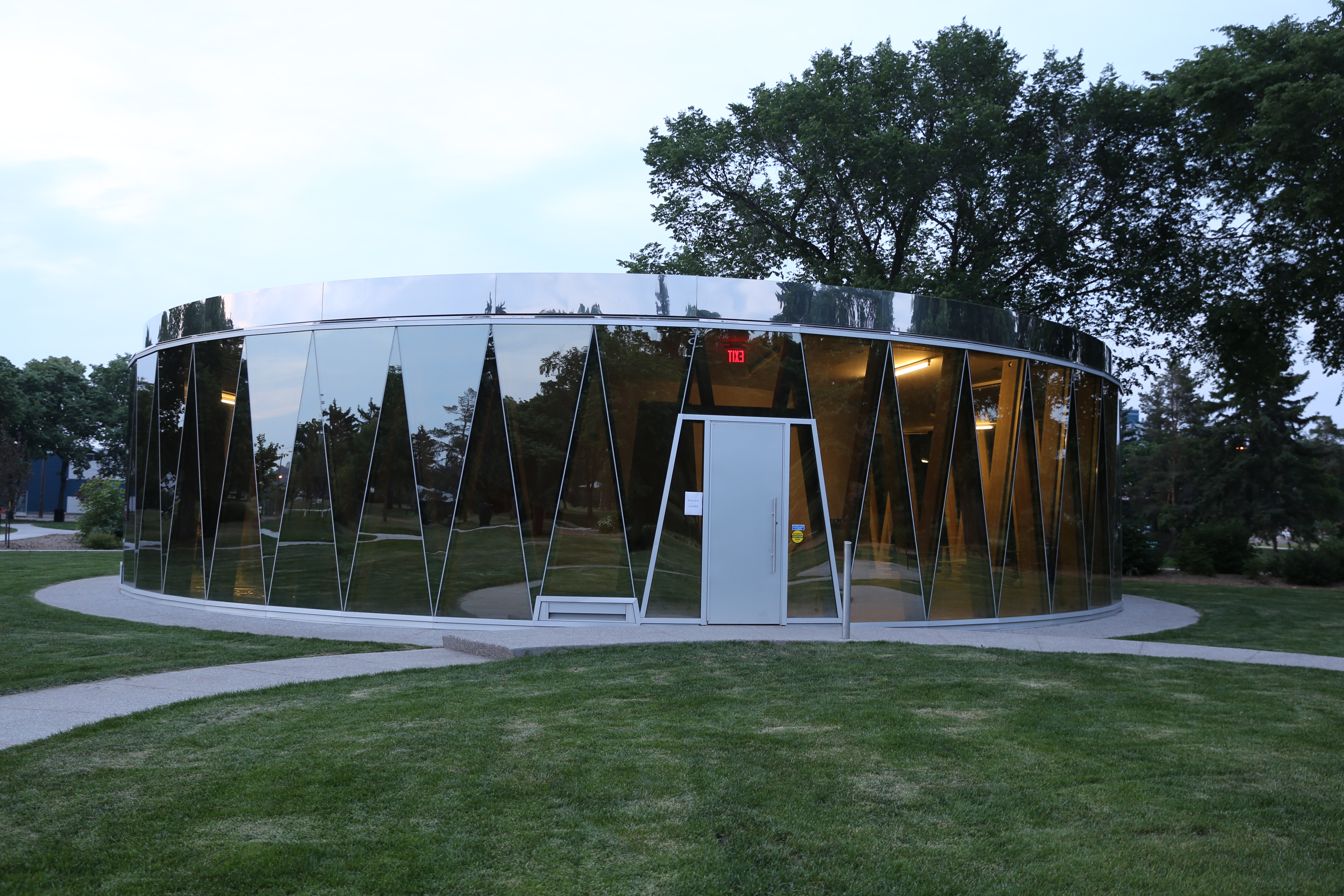
Borden Park Pavilion

Her designs include the Borden Park Pavilion, Borden Park Natural Swimming Pool, Stormwater Facility (SWF), Boathouse Studio, and Kathleen Andrew's Transit Garage (KATG). In 2019, Azure magazine said her two projects within Borden Park were "part of the 10 most memorable architectural works of the past decade".

== Select projects ==
- 2025: O-day'min Park (with CCxA)

== Select publications ==
- Hanson, Pat; Kapusta; Kuwabara; Bozikovic (June 2022). "Advocating for high quality architecture and design in public interventions across Canada : strategies and decision-making tools". ARQ: Architecture & Design Quebec (199): 44–46. ProQuest 2684175238.
