= Carol Bélanger =

Canadian architect

Carol Bélanger is a Canadian architect who currently serves as the City Architect of Edmonton, Alberta.

== Personal life and education ==
Bélanger is from a French Canadian military family that moved around to several places, including Nova Scotia, Ontario, Quebec, and Germany. He received a bachelor's degree from University of Manitoba and a master's degree from Dalhousie University.

Bélanger was previously married to architect Naomi Minja, with whom he lived first in the Edmonton neighborhood of Highlands before moving to Glenora in a house that Bélanger and Minja designed together. Bélanger and Minja have two sons together. As of 2022, Bélanger lived with his partner Dustin Ostrowerka in a house Bélanger designed in the Edmonton neighborhood of Glenora.

== Career ==
Bélanger spent 15 years working in the private sector before joining the city of Edmonton in 2005. He was appointed to the role of City Architect in 2009, following mayor Stephen Mandel's declaration that "our tolerance for crap is now zero." In this role, he has revamped the procurement process for public buildings such as recreation centers and libraries, which is widely credited with raising the standard for public architecture in Edmonton and setting new standards for Canada. He was aided in this goal by an agreement among Canada's Western provinces that required bids to be tendered freely. Under his leadership, the city implemented a new qualifications-based selection process in which fees were determined using Consulting Architects of Alberta fee schedules. They also held an anonymous design competition for five park pavilions; one of the winners, the Borden Park Pavilion by gh3*, won a 2018 Governor General's Medal in Architecture—the first awarded in Edmonton since 1992.

In 2017, Bélanger was honored with a fellowship from the Royal Architectural Institute of Canada (RAIC). In 2023, Bélanger won an Advocate for Architecture award from the RAIC for his role in reversing the decline in investment in Edmonton's public buildings.
