= Qualification =

Qualification or Qualify may refer to:

== Processes ==
- Qualifications-Based Selection (QBS), a competitive contract procurement process established by the United States Congress
- Process qualification, ensures that manufacturing and production processes can consistently meet standards during commercial production
- Qualification principle, in programming language theory, the statement that syntactic classes may admit local definitions
- Pre-qualification (lending), a process by which a lending institution estimates how much it is willing to lend to a borrower

== Credentials ==
- International Qualification Examination, taken by foreign accountants to become a Certified Public Accountant in the United States
- Professional qualification, attributes developed by obtaining academic degrees or through professional experience
- Qualification badge, a decoration of People's Liberation Army Type 07 indicating military rank or length of service
- Qualifications for professional social work, professional degrees in social work in various nations
- Qualification types in the United Kingdom, various levels of academic, vocational or skills-related education achievements
- School leaving qualification, academic qualification awarded for the completion of high school in various times and countries
- Scottish Vocational Qualification, certificate of vocational education in Scotland
- SQEP is an acronym for suitably qualified and experienced person

== Sports ==
- Category:Qualification for sports events
  - World Cup qualification (disambiguation)

== Other ==
- Grammatical modification, traditionally termed qualification in relation to nouns
- Qualification problem, the impossibility of listing all the preconditions required for an action to have its intended effect
- Qualify (horse), a racehorse
- Qualify (juggling), a minimal juggle, as opposed to a shorter flash

== See also ==
- Qualifier (disambiguation)
