= Robert L. Durham =

American architect (1912–1998)

- Born: April 28, 1912; Seattle
- Died: July 25, 1998 (aged 86); Seattle
- Occupation: Architect
- Awards: Fellow of the American Institute of Architects; Edward C. Kemper Award
- Practice: Stuart & Durham; Robert L. Durham & Associates; Durham, Anderson & Freed; Durham Anderson Freed Company; Durham Anderson Freed/HDR

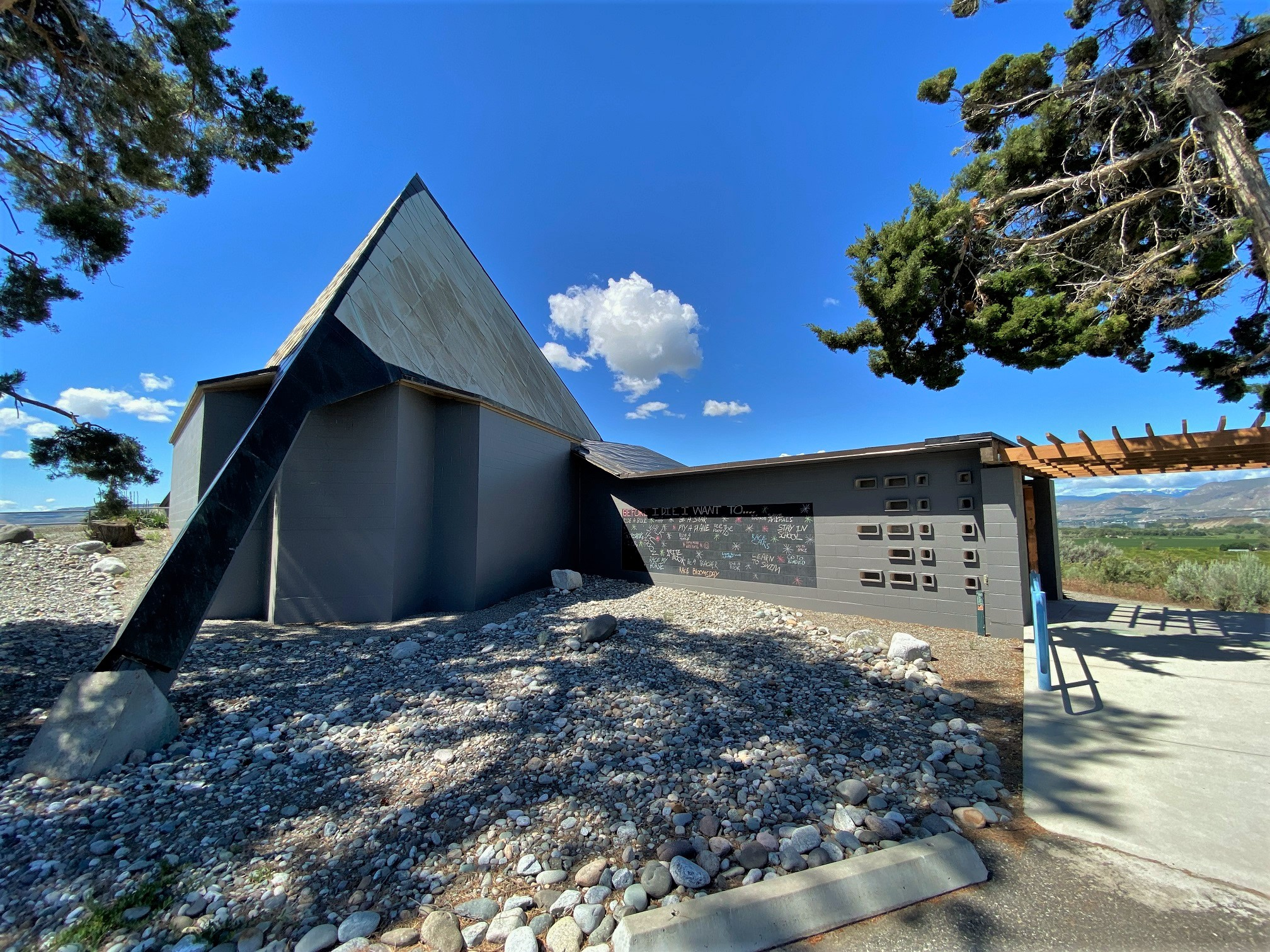
The Fort Okanogan Interpretive Center near Brewster, completed in 1960.

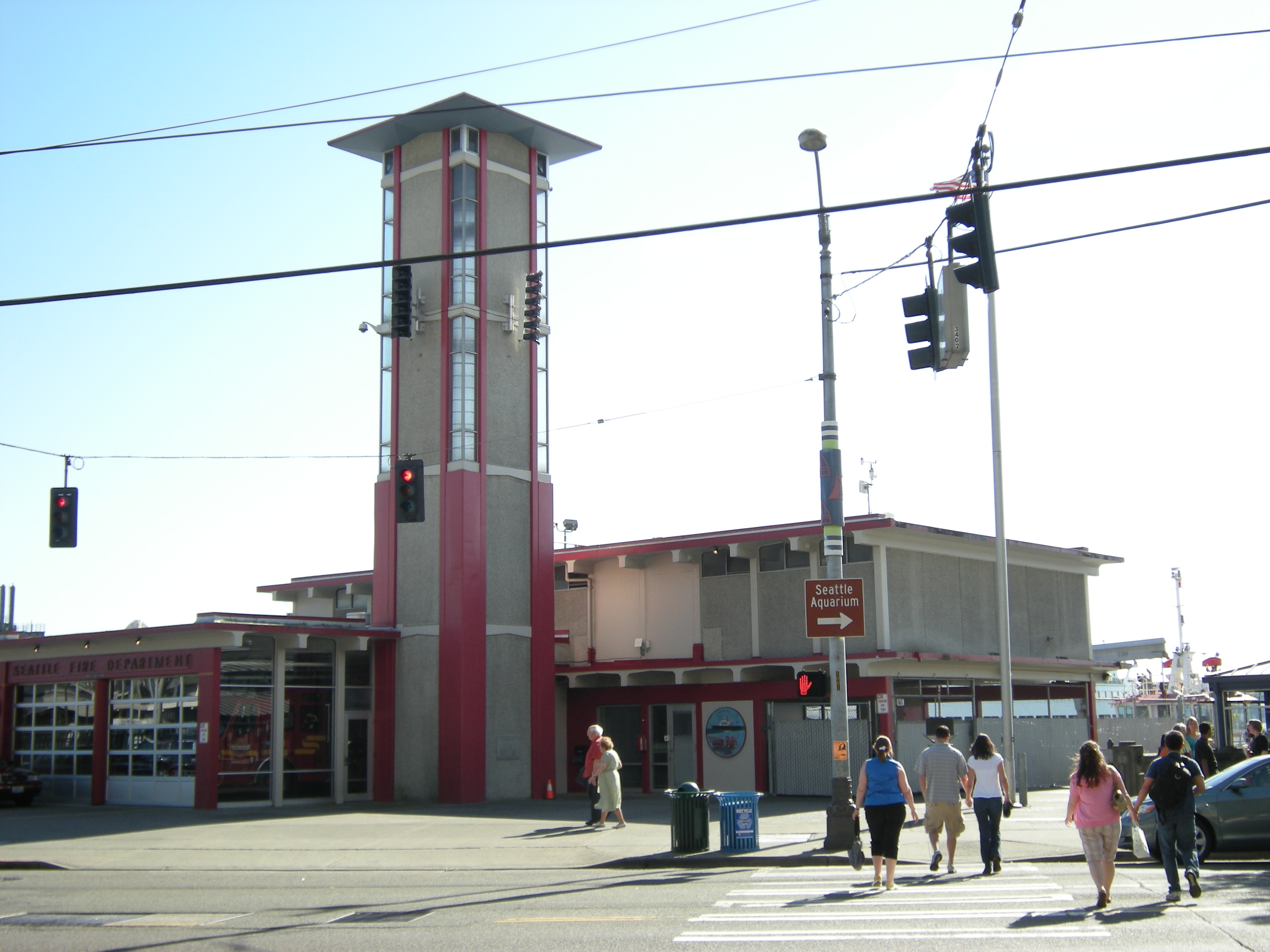
Fire Station 5 in Seattle, completed in 1963.

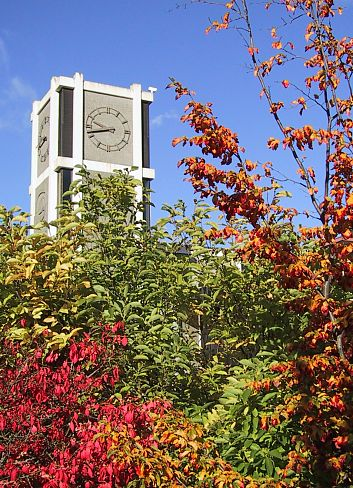
The clock tower of Demaray Hall of Seattle Pacific University, completed in 1968.

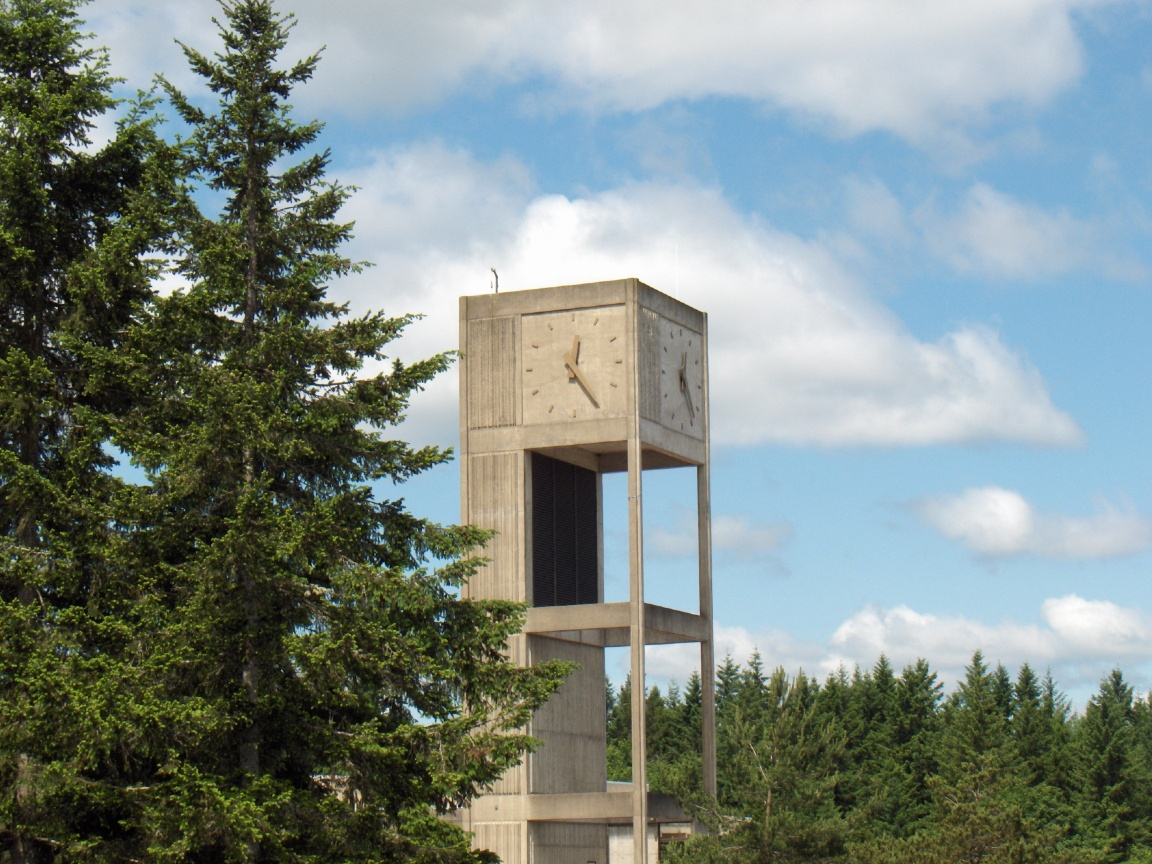
The clock tower of the Daniel J. Evans Library of Evergreen State College, completed in 1971.

Robert L. Durham FAIA (1912–1998) was an American architect in practice in Seattle from 1941 to 1977. He was president of the American Institute of Architects for the year 1967–68.

== Life and career ==
Robert Lewis Durham was born April 28, 1912, in Seattle to William Worth Durham, an architect, and Abbie May (McNett) Durham. He was educated in the Tacoma public schools and at the College of Puget Sound and the University of Washington, graduating from the latter in 1936 with a BArch. After a year with B. Dudley Stuart he joined the Federal Housing Administration as a construction engineer. In 1941 he rejoined Stuart in partnership, forming the firm of Stuart & Durham. They dissolved partnership in 1951, and Durham continued the firm as Robert L. Durham & Associates. This became Durham, Anderson & Freed in 1954 with the admission of associates David R. Anderson and Aaron Freed to full partnership.

Durham developed a general practice but was particularly noted for the design of churches, many of which won awards for their design. The partners incorporated the firm in 1969 as the Durham Anderson Freed Company, and in 1974 it was acquired by HDR, Inc. of Omaha, Nebraska, becoming Durham Anderson Freed/HDR. Durham retired as a principal in 1977, but remained a consultant to the firm until 1984. Anderson and Freed retired as principals in 1979 and 1986, respectively, but HDR continues to maintain a Seattle office.

Durham joined the American Institute of Architects in 1942 as a member of the Washington state chapter. He served as chapter president for 1954–55 before being elected Northwest and Pacific regional director in 1961, and was later elected president for 1967–68. After his presidency Durham represented the AIA on a General Services Administration special study committee on the selection of architects and engineers. He was a vocal supporter of the Brooks Act of 1972, which required that all architects and engineers selected for federal projects be evaluated based on their qualifications, not their bids. Durham was chancellor of the College of Fellows in 1979 and was awarded the Edward C. Kemper Award for service to the institute in 1981.

Durham was elected a Fellow in 1959, and after his presidency was elected to honorary membership in the Royal Architectural Institute of Canada, the Society of Architects of Mexico and the Architects Association of Peru.

In 1955 Durham was appointed to the Seattle Municipal Art Commission. He served as its chair from 1957 to 1959 and on the commission until 1965. From 1958 to 1962 he was chair of the cultural arts committee of the Century 21 Exposition and from 1969 to 1975 was a member of the Seattle Building Code Advisory Commission.

== Personal life ==
Durham was married twice: first in 1935 to Dorothy Evelyn Wyatt, who died the same year. He married second in 1936 to Marjorie Ruth Moser, who survived him. He had four children: David Robert Durham, Gail Maureen Durham, Catherine Louise Durham and Jennifer Ann Durham. An amateur artist, Durham focused on watercolor painting after his retirement. His work was exhibited at local festivals and in a one-man show at the Frye Art Museum. He died July 25, 1998, in Seattle following a two–year illness.

== Architectural works ==
- Magnolia UCC, 9140 California Ave SW, Seattle (1947)
- Shorewood Heights, 3209 Shorewood Dr, Mercer Island, Washington (1949)
- Orchard Terrace Apartments, 901 N Forest St, Bellingham, Washington (1950–51, NRHP 2015)
- Salmon UMC, 201 Lombard St, Salmon, Idaho (1950)
- Fauntleroy Church UCC, 9140 California Ave SW, Seattle (1952)
- Forest Lawn Mausoleum and Columbarium, 6701 30th Ave SW, Seattle (1954)
- First Congregational UCC, 280 Spartan Ave, Forks, Washington (1955)
- First Baptist Church, 1616 Pacific Ave, Everett, Washington (1955)
- Skyline House Apartments, 600 W Olympic Pl, Seattle (1955)
- Student Union Building, Seattle Pacific University, Seattle (1958–60)
- Bothell UMC, 18515 92nd Ave NE, Bothell, Washington (1959)
- St. Paul's Episcopal Church, 415 S 18th St, Mount Vernon, Washington (1959)
- Faith Lutheran Church, 2750 McLeod Rd, Bellingham, Washington (1960)
- First UMC, 1607 E Division St, Mount Vernon, Washington (1960)
- Fort Okanogan Interpretive Center, 14399 WA-17, Brewster, Washington (1960)
- Hilton Anchorage, 500 W 3rd Ave, Anchorage, Alaska (1960)
- Gwinn Commons, Seattle Pacific University, Seattle (1961–62)
- Hill Hall, Seattle Pacific University, Seattle (1961–63)
- Weter Memorial Hall, Seattle Pacific University, Seattle (1961–63)
- Central Church, 1124 Stevens Dr, Richland, Washington (1963–65)
- Fire Station 5, 925 Alaskan Way, Seattle (1963)
- Seattle Public Library Southwest Branch, 9010 35th Ave SW, Seattle (1963)
- Shilshole Bay Marina administration building, 7001 Seaview Ave NW, Seattle (1963)
- Ashton Hall, Seattle Pacific University, Seattle (1964–66)
- Central UMC, 1013 Polte Rd, Sedro-Woolley, Washington (1964–65)
- Demaray Hall, Seattle Pacific University, Seattle (1966–68)
- Congregation Ezra Bessaroth, 5412 Wilson Ave S, Seattle (1968–69)
- Atmospheric Sciences–Geophysics Building, University of Washington, Seattle (1969)
- Horizon House, 900 University St, Seattle (1970)
- Daniel J. Evans Library, Evergreen State College, Olympia, Washington (1971)
- Otto Miller Hall, Seattle Pacific University, Seattle (1974–76)

== See also ==
- Robert L. Durham, Department of Archaeology & Historic Preservation.
