= Jack Brooks (American politician) =

American politician (1922–2012)

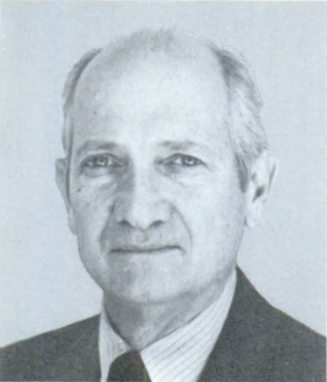
- Brooks in 1979

Member of the U.S. House of Representatives from Texas
- In office January 3, 1953 – January 3, 1995
- Preceded by: Jesse M. Combs
- Succeeded by: Steve Stockman
- Constituency: 2nd district (1953–1967); 9th district (1967–1995)
Committee positions
Chair of the House Judiciary Committee
In office January 3, 1989 – January 3, 1995
Preceded by	Peter W. Rodino
Succeeded by	Henry Hyde
Chair of the House Government Operations Committee
In office January 3, 1975 – January 3, 1989
Preceded by	Chester E. Holifield
Succeeded by	John Conyers (Oversight Committee)

Member of the Texas House of Representatives from the 16-1 district
- In office January 1947 – January 1951
- Preceded by: William Smith
- Succeeded by: William Ross

Personal details
- Born: Jack Bascom Brooks; December 18, 1922 Crowley, Louisiana, U.S.
- Died: December 4, 2012 (aged 89) Beaumont, Texas, U.S.
- Party: Democratic
- Spouse: Charlotte Collins (m. 1960)
- Children: 3
- Education: Lamar University (attended); University of Texas, Austin (BJ, LLB)

Military service
- Allegiance: United States
- Branch/service: United States Marine Corps
- Rank: Colonel
- Battles/wars: World War II
- Brooks's voice Brooks opening debate on the Flag Protection Act. Recorded September 12, 1989

Jack Bascom Brooks (December 18, 1922 – December 4, 2012) was an American Democratic Party politician from the state of Texas who served 42 years in the United States House of Representatives, initially representing Texas's 2nd congressional district from 1953 through 1967, and then, after district boundaries were redrawn in 1966, the 9th district from 1967 to 1995. He had strong political ties to other prominent Texas Democrats, including Speaker of the House Sam Rayburn and President Lyndon B. Johnson. For over fifteen years, he was the dean of the Texas congressional delegation.

== Early life ==
Brooks was born in Crowley, Louisiana, on December 18, 1922, and moved to Beaumont, Texas, at age 5 with his family. When he was 13 his father, a rice salesman, died and among the jobs young Brooks took on were as a carhop and a newspaper reporter. He enrolled at Lamar Junior College in 1939 after receiving a scholarship. After completing his two years at Lamar, he transferred to the University of Texas at Austin, from which he earned a Bachelor of Arts in journalism in 1943.

== Military service ==
Brooks enlisted in the U.S. Marine Corps during World War II. He served for about two years on the Pacific islands of Guadalcanal, Guam, and Okinawa, and in North China, attaining the rank of first lieutenant. Afterward, he remained active in the Marine Corps Reserve, retiring in 1972 with the rank of colonel.

== Political career ==
=== Texas legislature ===
A lifelong Democrat, Brooks was elected in 1946 to represent Jefferson County in the Texas House of Representatives. After his election, he sponsored a bill that would turn Lamar Junior College into a four-year university. The bill initially failed, but passed the following year. The institution is today known as Lamar University.

Brooks won re-election to the state legislature in 1948 without opposition; the following year he earned a law degree from the University of Texas Law School.

=== U.S. Congress ===
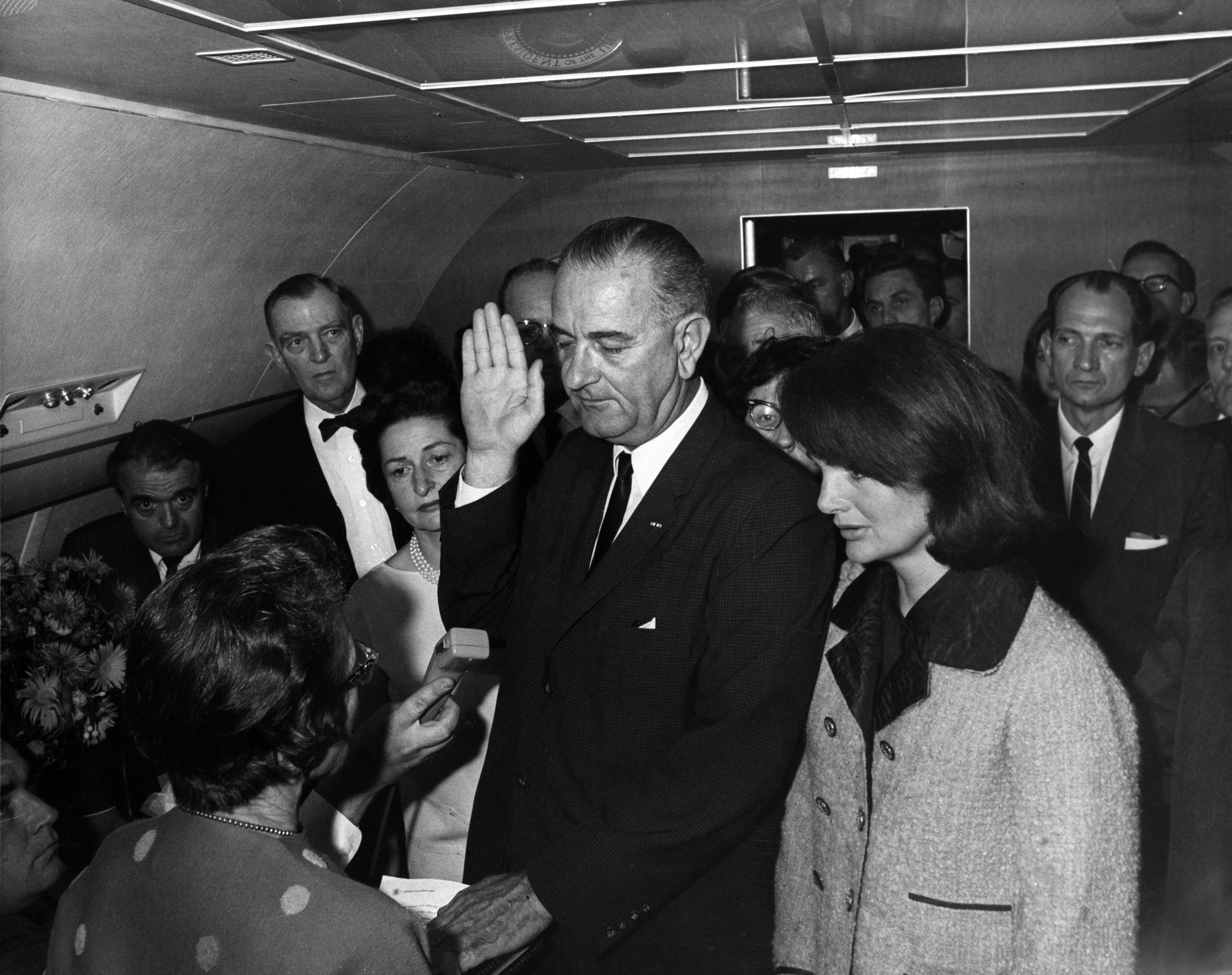
Lyndon B. Johnson taking the presidential oath of office, November 22, 1963; Brooks is visible at right, behind Jackie Kennedy

After four years in the Texas legislature, Brooks won a crowded 12-candidate Democratic primary and then was elected to the U.S. House of Representatives in the 1952 election.

A protégé of fellow Texans, House Speaker Sam Rayburn and then-U.S. Senator Lyndon B. Johnson, Brooks showed himself to be a conservative on some issues like the death penalty and gun control, but more liberal on issues like domestic spending, labor, and civil rights. In 1956, he refused to sign the Southern Manifesto that opposed racial integration in public places. Brooks voted against the Civil Rights Acts of 1957 and 1960, but voted in favor of the 24th Amendment to the U.S. Constitution, the Civil Rights Acts of 1964 and 1968, and the Voting Rights Act of 1965. As a member of the House Judiciary Committee, he helped to write the 1964 and 1965 bills. During his Congressional tenure, Brooks had a voting record that was for the most part a liberal one.

On November 22, 1963, Brooks was in President John F. Kennedy's motorcade in Dallas at the time Kennedy was assassinated. Hours later, he was present on Air Force One when Lyndon B. Johnson was sworn in as president.

The 2nd was redistricted as the 9th district in 1966, after the Supreme Court ruled in Wesberry v. Sanders that congressional district populations had to be equal or close to equal in population.

One of Brooks's signature bills required competitive bidding for federal computing contracts. Initially conceived in the mid-1960s and enacted into law in 1972, the Brooks Act was the primary rule for all federal computer acquisitions for three decades, and is often cited as being a catalyst for technological advances.

As a member of the House Judiciary Committee, Brooks participated in the 1973–74 impeachment process against Richard Nixon. In mid-July 1974 he drafted and distributed to all members of the committee a strongly-worded set of articles of impeachment. Uncompromising though they were, the Brooks proposals provided others on the committee with an opportunity to meld their thoughts together and to further develop, thus serving as the foundation for the articles of impeachment that the committee subsequently adopted. Because of the part he played in the president's downfall, Nixon later called Brooks his "executioner".

Brooks was one of eight representatives to vote in favor of all five articles of impeachment against Nixon, brought before the Judiciary Committee. The others were also all Democrats: Robert Kastenmeier, Don Edwards, John Conyers, Barbara Jordan, Charles Rangel, Elizabeth Holtzman and Edward Mezvinsky.

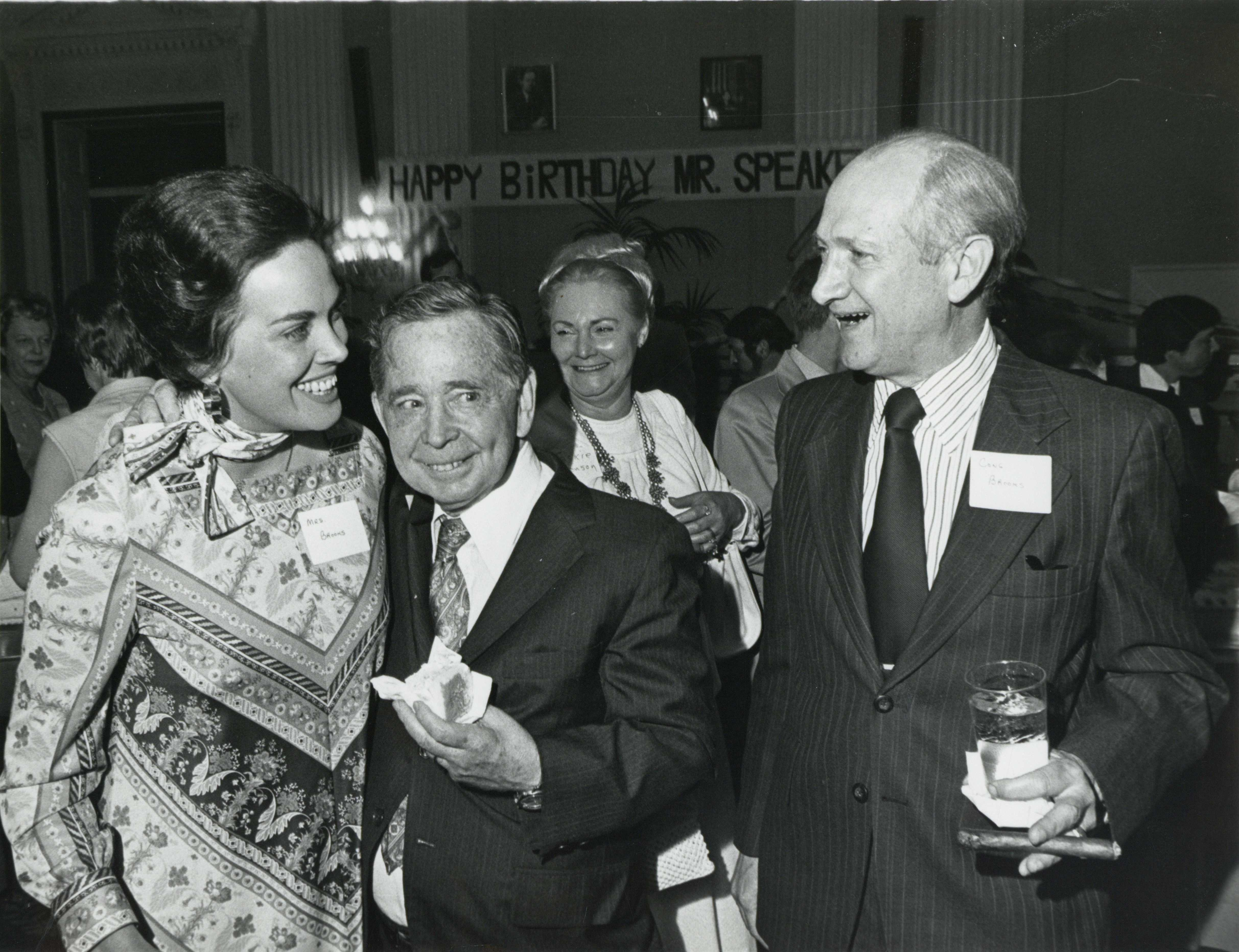
Brooks (right), with his wife Charlotte Collins (left) and Speaker Carl Albert.

Brooks was chairman of the U.S. House Committee on Government Operations from 1975 through 1988, and of the U.S. House Committee on the Judiciary from 1989 until 1995. He also served on the Select Committee on Congressional Operations, the Joint Committee on Congressional Operations, and the Subcommittee on Legislation and National Security. In 1979, he became the senior member of the Texas congressional delegation, a position which he maintained for fifteen years.

As the leader of the Government Operations Committee, Brooks oversaw legislation affecting budget and accounting matters, and the establishment of departments and agencies. He also helped pass the Inspector General Act of 1978, the General Accounting Office Act of 1980, the Paper Reduction Act of 1980, and the Single Audit Act of 1984.

In 1988, Brooks's influence was made prominent by his unusual involvement in trade policy. He introduced a spending bill amendment that banned Japanese companies from U.S. public works projects for one year. He said he was motivated by continuing signs that the Japanese government "intended to blatantly discriminate against U.S. firms in awarding public works contracts". House Majority Leader Tom Foley of Washington, who opposed the amendment, said Brooks "is one of the most powerful and effective chairmen in Congress."

Brooks served twice as a House impeachment manager, being among the House impeachment managers that successfully prosecuted the cases against federal judges Alcee Hastings and Walter Nixon in their 1989 impeachment trials.

While chair of the House Judiciary Committee, Brooks sponsored the Americans with Disabilities Act of 1990, the Omnibus Crime Control Act of 1991, and the Civil Rights Act of 1991. He was also a sponsor of the 1994 Violent Crime Control and Law Enforcement Act, a measure which eventually came to include a ban on assault weapons (the inclusion of which he opposed).

Brooks won re-election in the 1992 election, comfortably defeating his Republican opponent Steve Stockman. However, two years later, in 1994, the 21-term incumbent unexpectedly lost to Stockman, becoming the most senior representative ever to be unseated in a general election, a distinction Brooks still holds as of 2026. His tenure had extended across the administrations of 10 U.S. presidents, and he was on the verge of becoming the dean of the U.S. House had he won a 22nd term.

== Personal life and death ==
In 1960, Brooks married Charlotte Collins. They had three children: Jeb, Kate, and Kimberly.

Brooks died at Baptist Hospital in Beaumont on December 4, 2012, at age 89.

== Legacies and tributes ==
- In 1978, a U.S. courthouse and post office in Beaumont, Texas, were renamed the Jack Brooks Federal Building.
- A Galveston County park in Hitchcock is named Jack Brooks Park.
- In 1989, a statue of Brooks was placed in the quadrangle at Lamar University in Beaumont.
- In 2001, NASA presented its Distinguished Service Medal to Brooks at a ceremony in the John Gray Center of Lamar University. NASA Admin. Daniel Goldin cited Brooks's long-standing support of the U.S. space program and his role in "strengthening the agency during its formative years". Goldin said "Congressman Brooks took it upon himself to personally deliver support to one of the agency's key programs: the design, development, and on-orbit assembly of the International Space Station."
- In 2002, Brooks was named Post Newsweek Tech Media's "Civilian executive of the last twenty years" by Government Computer News.
- In 2008, Brooks donated his archives to the Dolph Briscoe Center for American History of the University of Texas at Austin.
- In 2010, the Southeast Texas Regional Airport was renamed Jack Brooks Regional Airport in Brooks's honor.
- In the 2016 Oscar nominated movie Jackie, he was portrayed by actor David Friszman.

== See also ==
- Politics of Texas
- Gun law in the United States
- Rex 84

== Notes and references ==
U.S. House of Representatives
Preceded by Jesse M. Combs	Member of the U.S. House of Representatives from Texas's 2nd congressional district 1953–1967	Succeeded by John Dowdy
Preceded by Clark Thompson	Member of the U.S. House of Representatives from Texas's 9th congressional district 1967–1995	Succeeded by Steve Stockman
Preceded by Chester E. Holifield	Chair of the House Government Operations Committee; 1975–1989	Succeeded by John Conyers as Chair of the House Oversight Committee
Preceded by Peter W. Rodino	Chair of the House Judiciary Committee; 1989–1995	Succeeded by Henry Hyde
