= De Valkenier =

Amusement park in Valkenburg aan de Geul, Netherlands

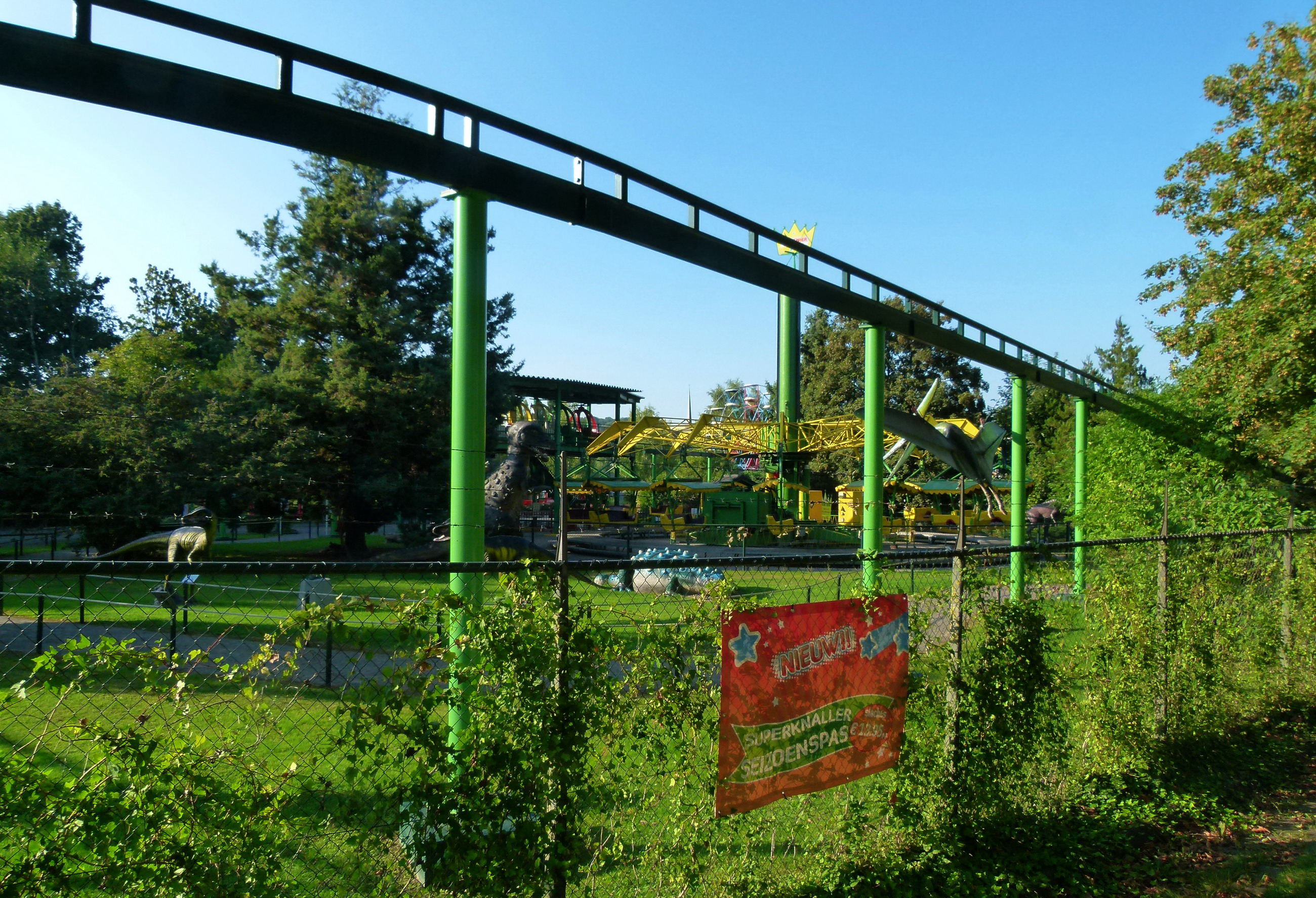
- Interactive map of De Valkenier
- Type: Amusement Park
- Location: Valkenburg aan de Geul, Netherlands
- Coordinates: 50.868°N 5.824°E
- Opened: 1934
- Closed: 2021
- Founder: Jan Albert Otermans
- Manager: Nancy Otermans (2008-present)
- Visitors: 180.000 per year
- Status: Closed
- Website: https://www.pretpark-de-valkenier.nl/en

De Valkenier (English: The falconer) was an amusement park in Valkenburg aan de Geul, Netherlands. The attractions focused mostly on families with children below the age of twelve. Founded by Jan Albert Otermans in 1934 under the name Ontspanningsoord Natuurbad Valkenburg (English: Recreational natural pool Valkenburg) it was the oldest amusement park in the Benelux countries. Starting with a rowing pond with a playground and pool, the park added attractions over the years and slowly grew into a modern amusement park. A rollercoaster and other mechanised entertainment was introduced in the 1970s and 1980s and the name of the park was changed to De Valkenier.

== History ==
The park was founded in 1934 by Jan Albert Otermans under the name Ontspanningsoord Natuurbad Valkenburg (English: Recreational natural pool Valkenburg). This makes it the oldest amusement park in the Benelux countries, with Duinrell opening a year later. The first attractions were a rowing pond and playground. Soon a mixed gender pool was added. Otermans expanded the park with non-mechanical attractions like slides and playground equipment. After his death in 1975 his children continued the park, added mechanised attractions, and changed the name to its current name De Valkenier to fit the content.

== Attraction tax ==
In 2004 the municipality of Valkenburg aan de Geul introduced a new attraction tax which would increase taxes for the park. After the tax was introduced, it was proposed to move the park to the Steinerbos attraction park in Stein. However, the park did not move.

== Management ==
The amusement park is a family business. Jan Albert Otermans was succeeded by his son and two grandsons before the current manager, great-granddaughter Nancy Otermans took over in 2008.

== Gallery of images ==
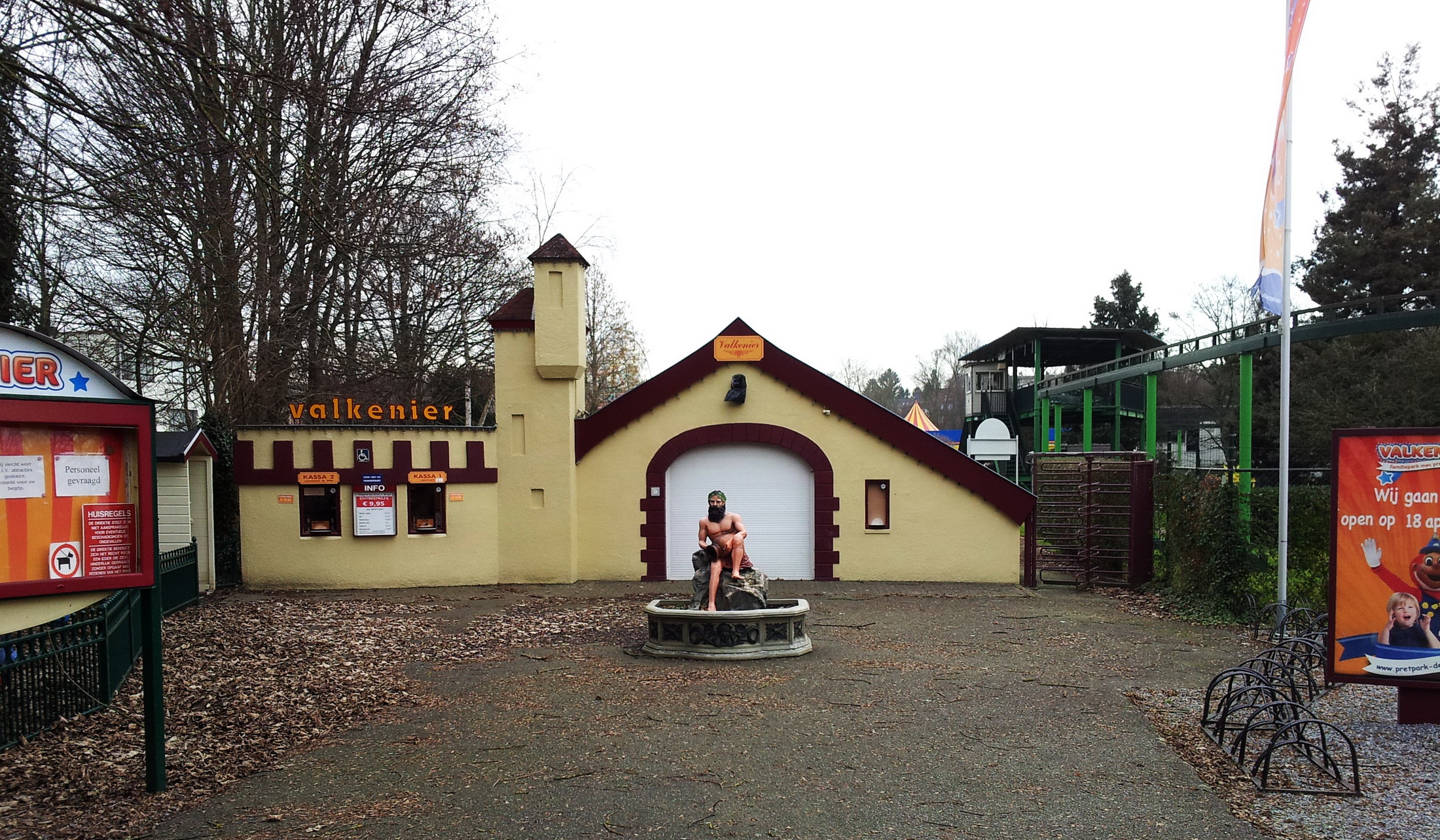
Entrance

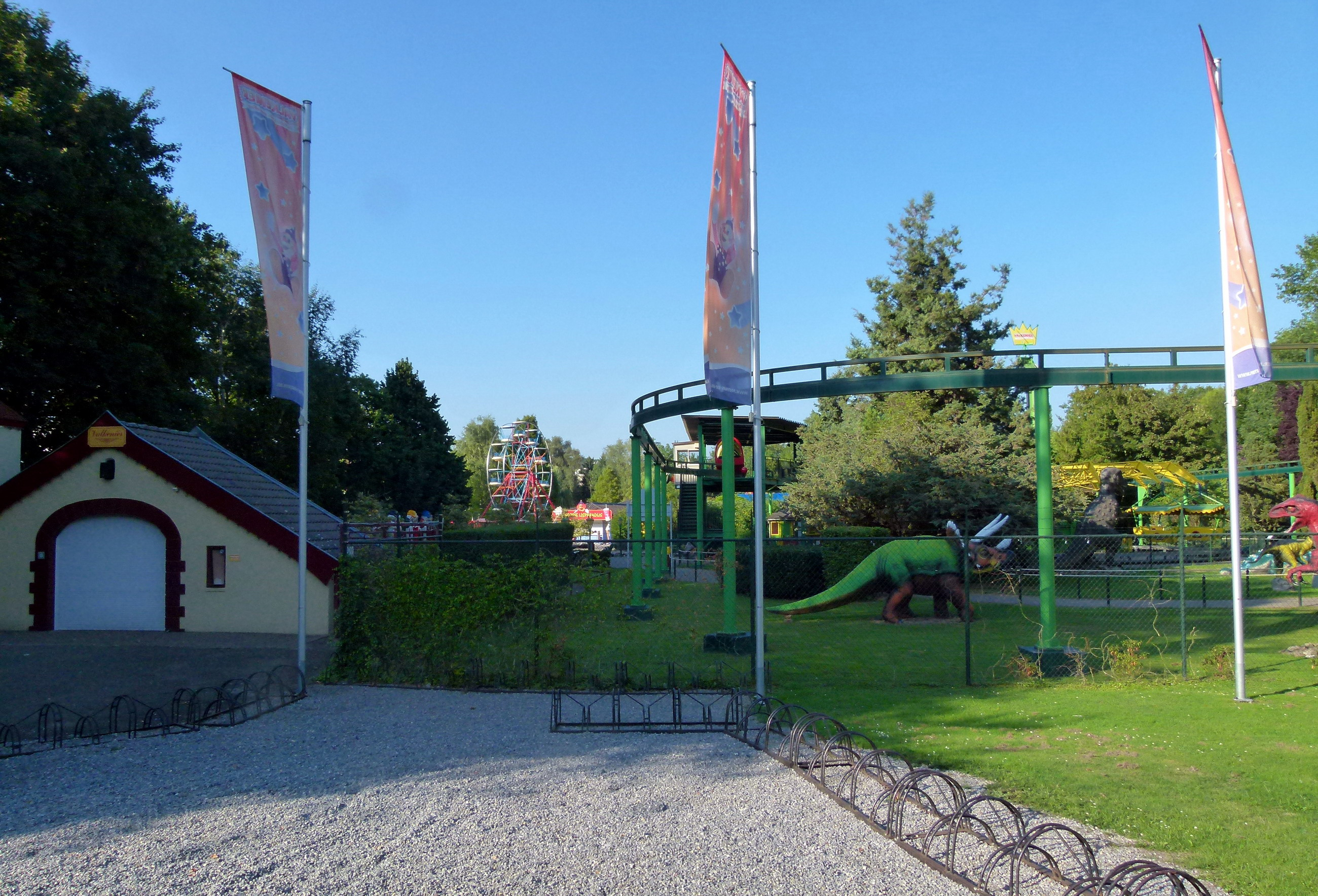
View from the entrance

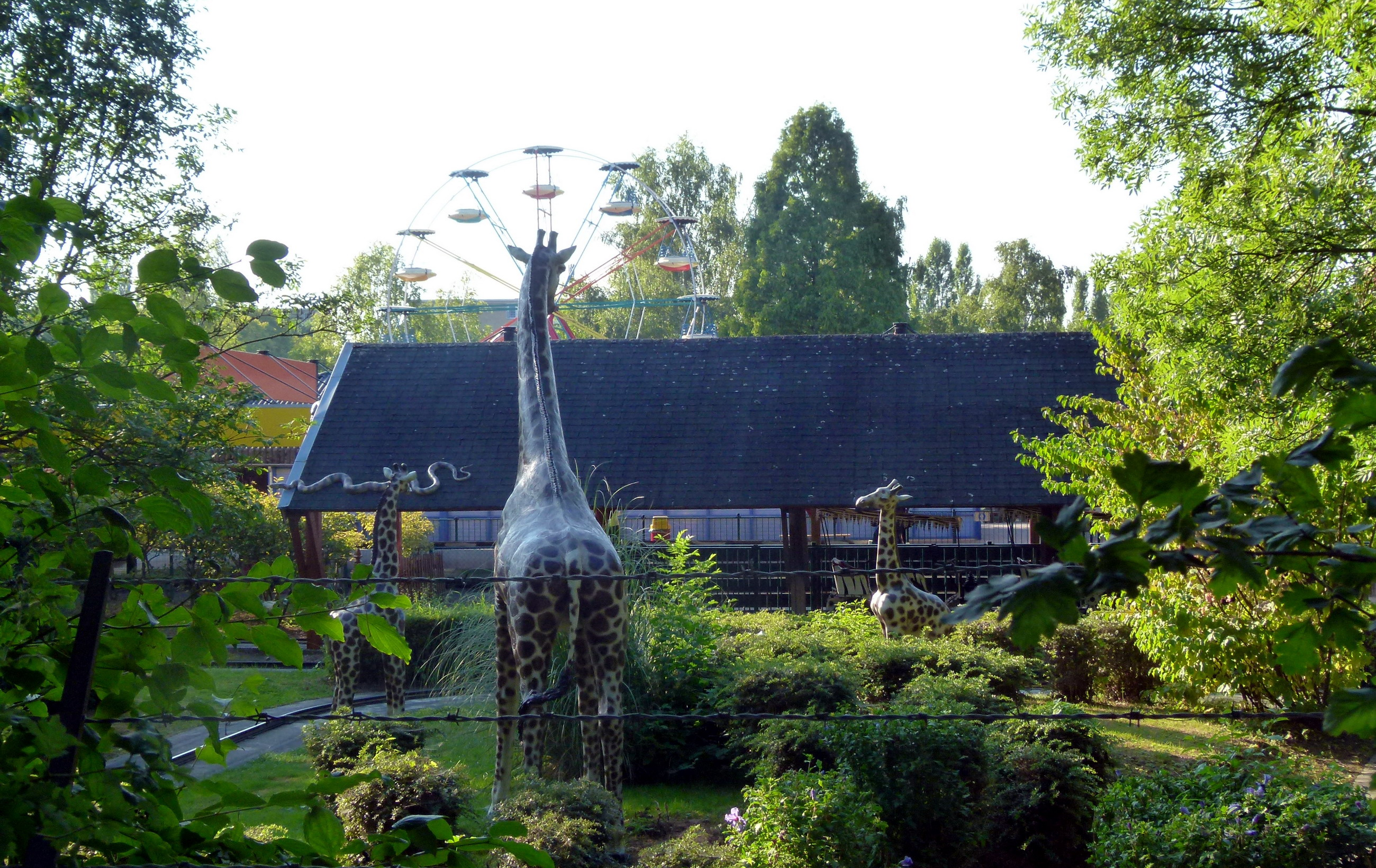
Safari and ferris wheel
