= Borden Park =

Park in Edmonton, Alberta

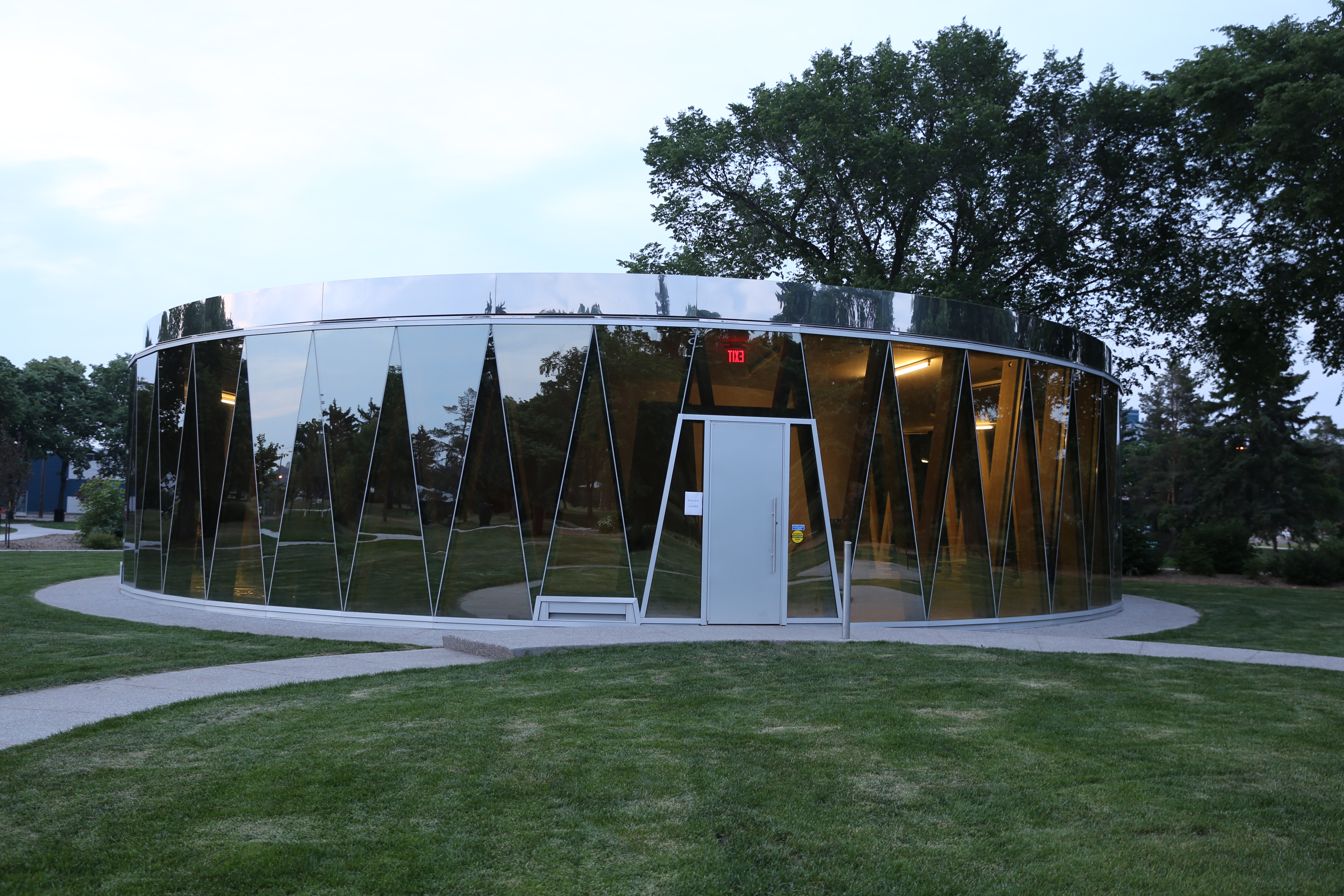
- The exterior of the Borden Park Pavilion

- Location within Edmonton
- Interactive map of Borden Park
- Location: Edmonton, Alberta, Canada
- Coordinates: 53°33′48″N 113°27′07″W
- Area: 22 hectares (54 acres)
- Created: 1906
- Operator: City of Edmonton
- Open: 05:00–23:00

Borden Park is a public park in Edmonton, Alberta. It is situated between the neighborhoods of Virginia Park to the south, Cromdale to the west, and Highlands to the east across Wayne Gretzky Drive.

== History ==
The park was established in 1906 as the East End City Park, but was renamed for Prime Minister Robert Borden after his 1914 visit to Edmonton. In its early days, the park was a popular spot for picnics and concerts, and was also home to a tea room, fairground rides, and the original Edmonton Zoo. The whole park was refurbished in the mid-1950s and re-opened on Dominion Day, 1958, with an address by then-mayor William Hawrelak. The refurbishment also involved the construction of an arched bandshell and ancillary building, which were designed by City Architect Robert W. Falconer and architect W. Pasternak.

== Borden Park Pavilion ==
A notable feature of Borden Park is the round pavilion that houses its bathrooms. The pavilion's exterior consists of a glulam Douglas fir truss supporting triangular glass panels which are transparent from the inside but dark and mirror-like from the outside.

The pavilion was first designed in 2011 by gh3* as part of a design competition for five park pavilions proposed by city architect Carol Bélanger. The building was constructed and opened as part of a broader renovation of the park that was completed in 2014. The resulting constructed design won a Governor General's Medal in Architecture, which was the first awarded in Edmonton since 1992. Azure listed Borden Park, with particular mention of the pavilion, as one of the 10 projects that defined the 2010s in Canadian architecture. The bathrooms also won the 2021 edition of the Canada's Best Restroom contest sponsored by Cintas.

== Borden Park Natural Swimming Pool ==
Another prominent feature of Borden Park is its natural swimming pool, the first of its kind in Canada. The pool includes a main pool area that slopes to a depth of two meters and a children's wading pool with a depth of 0.6 meters, both surrounded by constructed beaches. Rather than being treated with chlorine or salt, the water is circulated through a series of regeneration basins with gabions, plants, and microbes that remove human contaminants. The pool is surrounded by a low-slung minimalist building that includes showers and changing areas.

The pool was opened in 2018 and cost $14.4 million. This delivery was more than two years behind schedule, in part because the initial design proved too expensive. There were also technical issues, including a leak in the liner of one of the filtration ponds that needed to be repaired before opening. The design of the pool and building was meant to evoke both the winding of the North Saskatchewan River and the flatness of the surrounding prairie. Both were designed by gh3* and received the 2019 Innovation in Architecture award from the Royal Architectural Institute of Canada. They were also recognized in Azure's 2020 awards with the top prize in the Buildings Under 1,000 Square Metres category.

The fact that the water is not chemically treated necessitates special rules for swimmers. Only 980 swimmers are allowed in the pool each day, and at most 500 at a single time. (In the 2024 season, the average number of daily swimmers was 187.) Swimmers must take a full shower before each time they enter the pool and may not wear cotton clothing or sunscreen with phosphates. The water is only heated up to 23 °C and the pool is shut down if the temperature exceeds 29 °C on sunny days. Despite these rules, there have been warnings about risk of contamination. A pair of 2021 studies suggested that the natural filtration system was slow to clear out contaminants, leading to potential growth of harmful microbes. They suggested a limit of 45 bathers per day. The city sends samples to Alberta Health Services each week for fecal coliform testing. The kids' pool has faced multiple temporary shutdowns, and the city has also acknowledged high levels of algal growth in both pools, but it has generally insisted that the main pool is safe.

== Public art ==
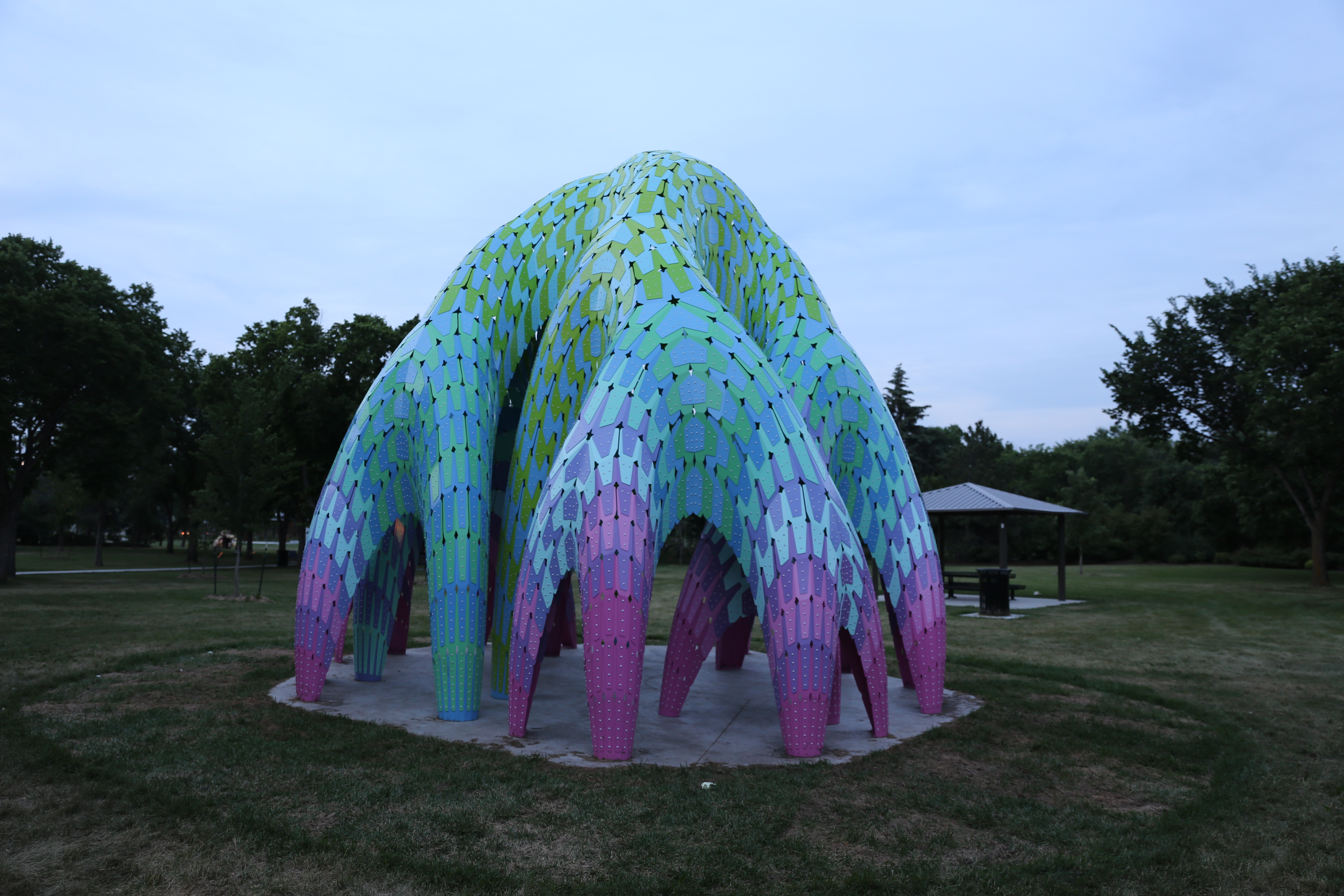
Vaulted Willow, a 2014 sculpture by Marc Fornes and THEVERYMANY that is permanently installed in Borden Park.

Borden Park is home to many outdoor works of public art. One notable permanent installation is Vaulted Willow, a sculpture by Marc Fornes and THEVERYMANY. The sculpture takes the form of a 20-foot-tall branching, downwardly curved structure made of 721 brightly colored aluminum shingles connected into a self-supporting structure. It was recognized as part of the Public Art Network Year in Review by Americans for the Arts.

The park also has a number of sculptures that are placed there on a rotating basis. These have included sculptures by prominent Edmonton artists, including Ken Macklin, Peter Hide, and Sandra Bromley.

Other artworks are found within the park structures. The pavilion contains the abstract mural Carousel by Nicole Gallelis painted on its inside walls. The bottom of the natural swimming pool features a mosaic by Métis artist William Frymire.
