= Natural pool (disambiguation) =

Natural pool may refer to:

- Garden pond, a pond in a garden naturally present or constructed
- Natural swimming pool, a man-made swimming pool using a natural filtration system
- Plunge pool, depression at the base of a waterfall or shut-in
- Stream pool, the natural part of a stream with above-average depth and below-average velocity
- Tide pool, a natural tidal pool
