= Aqual =

Aqual or variation, may refer to:

- Aqual, a brand name drug formulation of methaqualone
- AQUAL (A QUAdratic Lagrangian), a theory of gravity
- Aqual, a fictional character from the Japanese tokusatsu TV show Chousei Kantai Sazer-X

== See also ==
- Qualification (disambiguation)
- Qual or prelim, an exam
