= O-day'min Park =

Urban park in Edmonton, Alberta, Canada

- Warehouse Park
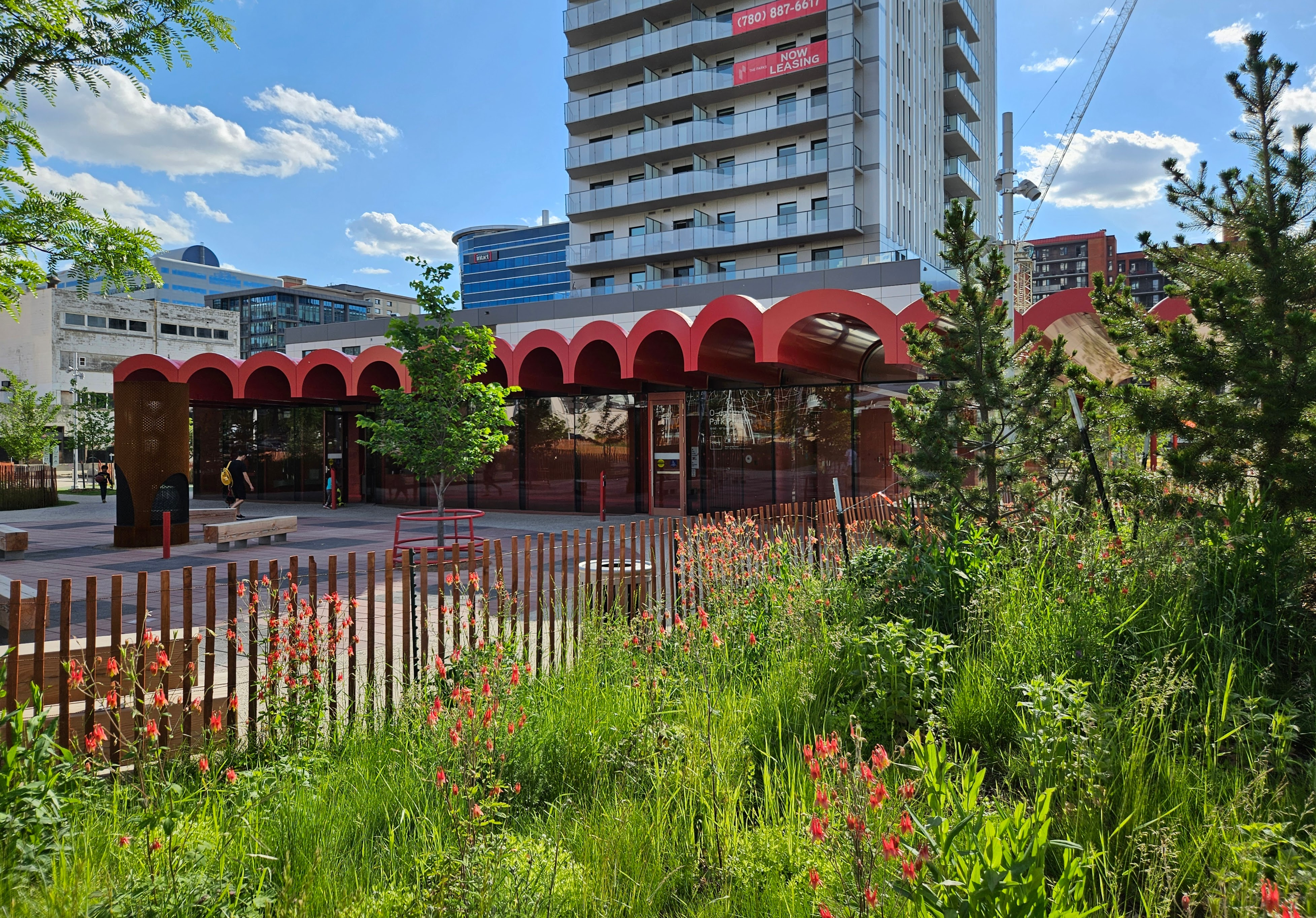
- A view of the O-day'min Park Pavilion

- Location within Edmonton
- Type: Urban park
- Location: Edmonton, Alberta
- Coordinates: 53°32′30″N 113°30′19″W
- Area: 0.025 km^{2} (0.01 sq mi)
- Opened: November 7, 2025; 8 months ago
- Public transit: Corona Station
- Website: Warehouse Park

O-day'min Park (formerly Warehouse Park) is a park in Downtown Edmonton, Alberta.

== History ==
Originally the site was several parking lots. In 2017, the city began to purchase and expropriate the land. Construction on the park started in July 2024, and is expected to open by the end of 2025.

The architecture of the park's pavilion, designed by architecture firm gh3*, has recognized with a 2024 Canadian Architect Award of Excellence and a 2026 Governor General's Medal in Architecture.

The park opened to the public on November 7, 2025.

== Features ==
- a tobogganing hill
- an off-leash dog park
- a pavilion with washrooms and community space
- a playground
- an outdoor exercise area
- picnic tables
