= Jesse M. Combs =

American politician (1889–1953)

Jesse Martin Combs
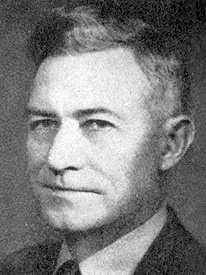

Member of the U.S. House of Representatives from Texas's 2nd district
- In office January 3, 1945 – January 3, 1953
- Preceded by: Martin Dies, Jr.
- Succeeded by: Jack Brooks

Personal details
- Born: July 7, 1889 Center, Texas
- Died: August 21, 1953 (aged 64) Beaumont, Texas
- Party: Democratic
- Education: Southwest Texas State Teachers College

Jesse Martin Combs (July 7, 1889 – August 21, 1953) was an American lawyer, jurist, and politician who served four terms as a U.S. representative from Texas from 1945 to 1953.

== Early life and education ==
Born in Center, Texas, Combs attended the public schools and graduated from Southwest Texas State Teachers College in 1912.

== Career ==
He was admitted to the bar in 1918 and commenced practice in Kountze, Texas.

=== Judge ===
He served as county judge of Hardin County, Texas (1919–1920). He served as district judge of the Seventy-fifth district (1923–1925). He served as associate justice of the ninth court of civil appeals (1933–1943).

=== Professional affiliations ===
He served as member and president of the board of trustees of South Park Schools (1926–1940). He served as president of the board of trustees of Lamar College (1940–1944).

=== Congress ===
Combs was elected as a Democrat to the Seventy-ninth and to the three succeeding Congresses (January 3, 1945 – January 3, 1953). He was not a candidate for renomination in 1952.

He was succeeded by Jack Brooks.

== Death ==
He returned to Beaumont, Texas, where he died August 21, 1953. He was interred in Magnolia Cemetery.

U.S. House of Representatives
Preceded by Martin Dies, Jr.	Member of the U.S. House of Representatives from Texas's 2nd congressional district 1945–1953	Succeeded by Jack Brooks
