= World Cup qualification (disambiguation) =

World Cup qualification often refers to FIFA World Cup qualification, in association football, a process for selecting national football teams for the men's FIFA World Cup.

World Cup qualification, or similar terms, may also refer to:

- FIFA Women's World Cup qualification, in association football
- FIBA Basketball World Cup qualification, in basketball
- Cricket World Cup qualification, for men's national cricket teams
- ICC World Cup Qualifier, in cricket
- Women's Cricket World Cup Qualifier
- Rugby World Cup qualification, in men's rugby union
- Women's Rugby World Cup qualification, in women's rugby union
- Rugby League World Cup qualification, in rugby league
