= Qualifier =

Qualifier may refer to:

- Qualifier (sport), a tournament elimination round
- Grammatical modifier, in linguistics
- Type qualifier, in computer programming

== See also ==
- Qualification
