= Women's Rugby World Cup qualification =

Rugby World Cup qualification

The Rugby World Cup qualification process determines the nations that will participate at the Rugby World Cup.

== History ==
The first three World Cups did not have any qualifying process. All the teams that attended were invited to participate. The 2002 Women's Rugby World Cup had the first and only qualification match, it was between Hong Kong and Japan, with the latter qualifying. The rest of the teams were invited to the tournament.

The 2006 Women's Rugby World Cup qualification was identical to the previous tournament as they only had one qualifying tournament in Asia. Kazakhstan qualified, although it was not their first appearance. In 2008, the Rugby World Cup Limited Board chairman, Bernard Lapasset announced a global qualification process for the 2010 Women's Rugby World Cup. However, not all member unions of the International Rugby Board were given an opportunity to qualify.

The 2014 Women's Rugby World Cup qualification had six teams that qualified automatically and six teams that qualified via regional tournaments. Africa had its first regional qualification.

The introduction of the repechage tournament in the 2017 World Cup qualifiers gave Hong Kong their first World Cup appearance. Seven teams automatically qualified for the tournament, England, Canada, France, Ireland, New Zealand, USA and Australia. The remaining five spots were determined through regional tournaments.

== Qualification competition entrants over time ==
Number of teams entering qualification (including automatic qualifiers)
Continental zone	1991 (Wales)	1994 (Scotland)	1998 (Netherlands)	2002 (Spain)	2006 (Canada)	2010 (England)	2014 (France)	2017 (Ireland)	2021 (New Zealand)	2025 (England)
Total berths in the World Cup	12	12	16	16	12	12	12	12	12	16
Africa	0	0	0	0	1	1	3	0	4	4
Asia	1	2	1	3	4	4	7	2	7	3
Europe	8	8	11	9	5	12	11	12	9	11
North America	2	2	2	2	2	2	2	2	2	2
Oceania	1	0	2	3	3	3	3	4	6	6
South America	0	0	0	0	0	0	0	0	2	2
Total entrants	12 (Note: There was no qualifying process for the 1991, 1994 and 1998 World Cups. Teams were instead invited.)	12	16	17 (Note: The 2002 & 2006 World Cups only had a qualifying process for Asia, teams from other regions were invited.)	15	22	26	20	30	28
