= Women's Auxiliary Groups of the American Institute of Architects =

During the middle of the 20th century, various women’s auxiliary groups were formed to support local and state chapters of the American Institute of Architects (AIA). The names of these groups were usually a variation of Women’s Architectural League (WAL) or Women’s Architectural Auxiliary (WAA) depending on the location of the chapter. WAL groups were active from 1941 through the early 1980s. Membership usually included the wives of AIA architect members and sometimes women architects. The groups were most often involved in public education, architectural scholarship fundraising, political lobbying, assisting with the hosting of national or state AIA conventions held in their home city, and hosting social events for women associated with the field of architecture.

== Founding and establishment ==
The first recorded WAL groups were founded in California. In 1940, wives were invited to attend the State Association of California Architects Convention in Monterey with their husbands. A delegate presenting on ways to improve architect public relations, Mr. Norman Blanchard, AIA, of San Francisco, suggested the organization of a women’s auxiliary to the state AIA and was met with great enthusiasm. In the spring of 1941, the first two chapters were formed—the East Bay Chapter with 42 charter members and the San Francisco Chapter with 22 charter members. The name “Women’s Architectural League” was adopted in 1946, and the organization was officially incorporated in 1951.

WAL activities were put on hold during the years of World War II, but detailed news of California’s women’s auxiliary groups first appeared in the national AIA Journal in 1946. Other states followed suit, and by 1964 fifty WAL chapters existed throughout the United States supporting local AIA chapters.

In 1949, the California group of WALs was included in a national publication entitled Guide to Women’s Organizations: A Handbook About National and International Groups that acknowledged the need for women’s groups to devote themselves to the important political, social, and environmental issues of the day rather than just inconsequential social activities.

== Organization ==
Unlike the AIA, the women’s auxiliary groups were not directly overseen or regulated by a single national organization. Instead, each group was unique to its chapter and locale. Since no single national organization existed, there is no central archive of chapters, membership rosters, or general history in existence. Groups had different names depending on the preference of its founding members, although they were usually a variation of Women’s Architectural League (WAL) or less commonly Women’s Architectural Auxiliary (WAA).

=== Relationship to AIA and structure ===
While membership in the AIA is on three levels—national, state, and local with dues being paid to all three components—the women’s auxiliary groups lacked a national structure. They had no official ties to the national AIA and instead were affiliated with either a regional or state chapter. Many of the AIA chapters served by the auxiliaries appointed a liaison officer to the Board or Central Committee of the WAL to advise.

Chapters wrote their own by-laws or constitution and elected officials (typically president, vice president, treasurer, and secretary). A board was also formed in some cases. Members-at-large served on committees which varied depending on the mission and interests of the chapter. WAA New York included committees for benefit planning, history, membership, program, public relations, and scholarship. WAL San Francisco committees included legislative, educational, program, membership, and publicity.

The California WAL groups were also loosely organized at the state level. They formed a Central Committee in 1951 due to the large number of groups spread across the state. The president plus one delegate from each chapter participated, and the committee served as a central information source and resource for establishing new chapters.

=== Recognition by AIA ===
Beginning with the 1962 National AIA Convention held in Dallas, a meeting of all women’s architectural auxiliaries was traditionally scheduled on the national convention program with the purpose of exchanging ideas. The Dallas convention featured a panel on women’s architectural auxiliary groups to encourage the growth and formation of new chapters. Participants included Mrs. Robert Cutler, immediate past president of the New York Women’s Architectural Auxiliary; Mrs. Malcolm Reynolds of the East Bay WAL, Mrs. A. B. Swank Jr. of the Dallas WAL, Mrs. Harold Colhoun of the Houston WAL, Mrs. R. Max Brooks of the Austin WAL, and Mrs. Reginald Roberts of San Antonio WAL. This discussion also confirmed that a national WAL organization was unnecessary as chapters preferred to pursue their own goals locally.

In the early 1980s the national AIA Journal listed Women’s Architectural Leagues in their Directory of AIA Resources published annually in the mid-August issue:

Women’s Architectural Leagues: Organized to promote and advance public awareness of architecture and to complement the activities of local AIA components. WAL has chapters throughout the country and holds a national meeting in conjunction with the annual AIA convention. Interested persons and components may obtain a roster of WAL chapters and information on local chapter activities.

Informational materials could be requested through the national Component Services Office.

=== Membership ===
Membership was typically limited to women related to architect members of the AIA including wives, widows, sisters, mothers, and daughters over the age of 18. In some regions it was typical to find women architects within the auxiliary membership. Some of these women architects were also members of the AIA, but not all. In later years, chapters that were still active often extended membership to any women interested in learning about architecture, regardless of affiliation with the field. By 1970, the NY WAA stated it was, “open as well to women similarly dedicated to its goal of helping young people seeking architectural careers.”

Some chapters offered different levels of membership. The New York WAA offered both active and patron tiers. Active members participated in the normal business and social activities of the group while patron members contributed financial support and often the power and sway of a well-known name. Many WAL groups offered corporate and associate memberships. Corporate members were wives of licensed architect AIA members. Associate memberships allowed for wives of unlicensed architectural school graduates or draftsmen to participate. Associate members could not always hold office or vote.

== Purpose ==
The mission of women’s auxiliary groups varied by chapter, with some focusing on fundraising through social functions and others dedicated to public education and service. Many chapters shared the language used by the first California chapters in their mission statements: “to advance the architectural profession, to create greater public interest in the profession, and to promote friendship and unity within the group.”

Regardless of their specific purpose, women’s auxiliary groups were important in that they allowed ordinary women to contribute to the field of architecture during a time when women architects were the exception rather than the norm. Some WAL chapters undoubtedly helped shape the profession and architectural history with their activities. The work of individual architects was uplifted and promoted by WAL groups with their house tours and lecture programs, and architects and the architectural profession were elevated in public esteem. Countless architectural students benefited from WAL scholarship funding, and many high school students were introduced to architecture as a viable career option.

== Programming ==
Although they varied by chapter, activities typically fell into five categories.

=== Public education ===
In the early 1940s, many architects were working to improve public relations for the profession at large. The general public had little knowledge of the skills and services offered by architects making it difficult to effectively market to clients. Many WAL chapters put on informative lecture series and architectural tours aimed at educating the public about the role of architects and the benefits of good design.

Women’s auxiliaries often garnered free publicity for the AIA when news of their activities circulated in local papers. A 1952 article in the AIA Journal written by the current San Francisco WAL president claimed that because of WAL activities the words “architect” and “architecture” appeared more frequently, and many newspapers had added regularly occurring content related to residential and commercial design and building as interest in the field increased.

==== Publications ====
As part of their public education efforts, several chapters authored and published guides and books related to home planning and the architecture of their city or state to further public architectural education.

San Francisco Bay Area, California
Women’s Architectural League Home Planning Guide, 1948.
You and Your Architect: A Home Planning Guide, 1956.

San Francisco WAL’s focus on increasing interest in architecture and improving public education regarding the profession resulted in these two publications aimed at housewives interested in working with an architect to design or renovate their homes. The style and content of the text reinforces the group’s respect for the architectural profession and its practitioners.

Austin, Texas
Austin and Its Architecture, 1976.

The Women’s Architectural League of Austin collaborated with the Austin AIA to research and edit this volume on Austin architecture for the 1976 bicentennial.

Austin’s Blueprint for Laughter, 1977.

WAL Austin authored and published this book containing architectural jokes and humorous anecdotes.

Portland, Oregon
A Century of Architecture in Oregon, 1859–1959, 1959.

WAL Oregon published a book on Oregon architecture in celebration of the state’s centennial with writing by Professor Marion Dean Ross.

St. Louis, Missouri
Historic Buildings and Contemporary Structures, date unknown.

Two books, featuring 18 historic buildings and 12 contemporary buildings, were written by the St. Louis Women’s Architectural League with an architect consultant for each building. Edited by George McCue, Hon. AIA, and Robert Vickery, AIA.

=== Academic education support ===
Most WAL groups provided financial support of some kind to students pursuing architectural education at the university level in the form of scholarship awards. Some chapters worked to improve architectural education in public schools at the junior high and high school levels. Activities included fundraising to purchase architectural books, slides, and films for schools; organizing AIA representation at career days; and sponsoring high school design and writing competitions.

=== Political lobbying ===
Many chapters, including the San Francisco and East Bay groups, had legislative committees charged with monitoring state politics for measures affecting the architectural profession. Theses members were charged with monitoring news, preparing materials, and reporting back to the AIA with their findings. Lobbying and letter writing campaigns resulted from their efforts.

=== AIA Convention hosting ===
Architects often brought their wives along to the annual national or state AIA conventions during the mid-century period. It became customary for the WAL groups to assist the local and state AIA chapters with planning and hosting events specifically for the ladies. Activities catering to visiting ladies and families were offered ranging from luncheons, teas, and cocktail parties to shopping trips and architectural tours.

=== Fellowship ===
Ultimately, WAL groups fostered connection and friendship amongst women who otherwise might not have met. Group members had a shared understanding of the sometimes-challenging aspects of living with an architect spouse. The Austin WAL included a humorous dedication in their 1964-65 yearbook:

Dedicated to: A temple of God; sometimes a professional herself; usually a mother, housewife and all the other professions that fall into the two categories; a connoisseur of good taste in culinary and the arts; a pleasant and cheerful attitude; suave, ingenious; bears a mind for politics; a good and understanding ear to listen to a few problems of the profession of her husband and last but not least a discriminating attitude towards her husband’s abilities in his profession. THE WOMAN MARRIED TO THE ARCHITECT

Most chapters managed to plan fun activities along with their work. Monthly meetings usually combined business with a social activity, and some chapters hosted lavish balls and parties for the architectural community.

== Notable chapters ==
=== Women’s Architectural League of San Francisco ===
WAL San Francisco was one of the first two women’s architectural auxiliary groups founded in California in 1941 with 22 charter members. Mrs. Harold Weeks served as the first president. Activities were often coordinated with the nearby Women’s Architectural League of the East Bay chapter. Alongside fundraising to support architectural education in high schools and grant scholarships to university students, the primary mission of the San Francisco chapter was advancement of the architectural profession through public education. In the words of President Mrs. Irwin M. Johnson, “A better public invariably makes for a better client.” This was accomplished through several channels including lecture series, forums, tours, and publications.

==== Lecture series ====
Several lectures and forums were held to educate housewives on the architectural design of homes. “The House I Want” lecture series was held in 1946 in both San Francisco and the East Bay, with guest speakers presenting at one location in the morning and the other in the afternoon. Lecturers included architects Gardner A. Dailey, John S. Bolles, Paul R. Williams, Pietro Belluschi, and William C. Ambrose; landscape architects Thomas D. Church and Edward A. Williams, decorators Frances Elkins and Maurice Sands, and textile designer Dorothy Liebes. A 1950 forum titled “The Public Meets the Architect” was aimed to familiarize the public with the role and skills of architects. “Let’s Build a House” was a series of four discussions held in 1953 covering financing, site selection, architectural planning, working with a contractor, landscaping, and interior decoration. In 1968, WAL sponsored lectures at USC that went beyond the realm of home design entitled “Architecture: The Language of Space, the Servant of Time and a Fine Art.” The series covered modern residential design, religious architecture, and Frank Lloyd Wright.

==== House tours ====
House tours raised scholarship funds and offered the opportunity to highlight the advantages of architect-designed home, making the public more "architect-minded." Some years had themes while others simply included a range of homes recently designed by local AIA members. In 1951 "Better Homes for Western Living" highlighted homes designed with California indoor-outdoor living in mind. 1952's "Arts and Architecture" took a unique approach by partnering with the Artists’ Equity Association to include artist studios on the tour, and 1958's tour showcased the architecture of Bernard Maybeck.

=== The Women’s Architectural Auxiliary of the New York Chapter AIA ===
This WAL chapter was founded in 1959 by five charter members: Mrs. Robert Ward Cutler, Mrs. Alonzo W. Clark 3rd, Mrs. Morris Ketchum Jr., Mrs. Irwin Leslie Scott, and Mrs. Harold R. Sleeper. The first event was a three-day car caravan tour of the Berkshires to initiate a membership drive. The group’s mission was to raise scholarship funds for worthy architecture students in need, specifically by hosting large social events throughout the year. While the focus was largely social, typical business meetings often included a speaker or film related to architecture followed by tea and discussion. The WAA also provided hosting assistance to the New York AIA when national conventions were held in Manhattan in 1967 and 1988.

==== Scholarships ====
Rather than individual scholarships, the NY WAA awarded lump sum scholarship grants to specific institutions, allowing the schools to make decisions regarding individual awards. After funds were raised, they were transferred to the NY AIA Chapter Education Committee for administration. A non-voting WAA representative also served on this committee. Scholarship grants were given to Columbia University, Pratt Institute, Cooper Union, and City College. By 1968, over $60,000 had been awarded. By 1972, that number had doubled to $120,000, with a total of 400 architectural students benefiting. In 1963 the New York AIA began an initiative to fund minority scholarships through the newly established Equal Opportunities Committee. The NY WAA contributed at $24,500 between 1968 and 1973.

==== Fundraising social events ====
The Doric Debutante Cotillion was an annual society group debut party held in the late fall or early winter at the Metropolitan Club beginning in 1959. It became a weekend event held in early September in Newport, RI for the years 1965 and 1966. Preference was given to daughters of architects when selecting the debutantes, and several well-known New York architecture names were represented over the years. A 1963 news item in the New York AIA newsletter reports that I.M. Pei escorted his stepsister Patricia Pei to the 1963 event.

As debutante events fell out of favor, a Scholarship Ball was started in 1968 in celebration of WAA’s 10th anniversary. It was held at the Waldorf-Astoria in the spring, and the funds raised were used to create an endowment fund to expand the Auxiliary’s activities.

Ticketed building and house tours were another big fundraising source. A church and temple tour started in June 1961 followed by the annual New York City Homes tour in the fall of 1962. The house tours typically featured architect-design homes and gardens. Larger building tour fundraising events combined architecture with a gala. These were ticketed tour and reception events that offered a behind-the-scenes look at recently constructed buildings, usually with architect-guided tours.

- Lincoln Center, 1965 – tour of the New York State Theater by Philip Johnson, the Philharmonic Hall by Max Abramovitz, and a construction site discussion with Skidmore, Owings & Merrill regarding the Metropolitan Opera House design.
- Juilliard School, 1969 - tour combined with a wine-tasting party and an organ recital at Lincoln Center. Architects Pietro Belluschi and Helge Westermann were guests of honor.
- City University of New York Graduate Center, 1970
- United Nations International School, 1973
- Elmer Holmes Bobst Library of New York University, 1974 - A 15th WAA anniversary gala celebration event included a talk by architect Philip Johnson, a tour of the building, and musical performances.

=== Women’s Architectural League of Austin, Texas ===
Founded in 1953, the Austin group’s two main focuses were assisting with the hosting of conventions and improving architectural education in the school system. Mrs. Charles Granger served as the first president.

==== Convention hosting ====
WAL Austin assisted with hosting duties when the Texas Society of Architects (the state AIA component) held the state convention in Austin in 1953, 1959, 1965, and 1970. Architects were encouraged to bring their wives along for the three-day convention. A complete schedule of ladies’ events accompanied the convention itinerary, including luncheons, teas, tours of the capitol area or Austin historic homes, and formal balls and parties. Wives were invited to attend the keynote sessions and awards luncheons along with their husbands. WAL Austin operated a hospitality lounge for the wives during convention hours and provided coffee, places to relax and visit, tables for bridge, television, sewing supplies, and cosmetics. The Austin ladies also took the opportunity to showcase their yearbooks and other materials to promote the formation of new women’s auxiliary groups elsewhere in Texas. At the 1953 convention only Austin and Dallas had organized AIA women’s auxiliaries.

==== Architectural education ====
WAL Austin raised funds to provide books and films on architecture for the Austin Public Highschool and Junior High Schools. The materials aimed to promote architecture as a potential profession as well as educate the next generation on design and the built environment. Two scholarships were also awarded to University of Texas at Austin architecture students each year, one per semester. Most fundraising events put on by the Austin WAL were of a social nature. Annual events included the holiday gala, a family picnic, teas or parties honoring wives of the University of Texas architecture students, and scholarship fundraising events included benefit luncheons and home tours.

== Effect on women architects ==
Some evidence suggests the activities of women’s auxiliary groups negatively affected women architects. The AIA’s reckoning with discrimination in the field began to take shape in the mid-1970s with the formation of a women in architecture task force. The resulting report published in 1975 indicates that in some locales, women architects reported being told to join the women’s auxiliary group when they applied for general AIA membership:

Women’s Architectural Auxiliaries: Extending membership to licensed female architects by Women’s Architectural Auxiliaries raises serious questions as to the actual attitudes within the AIA toward women architects. The existence of this practice can only be explained as a covert tool designed to keep architects who are women out of the AIA. In their present form, Women’s Architectural Auxiliaries continue to be a constant irritant to women architects and one of the factors which contribute to the perpetuation of stereotyped ideas of the role of men and women in the profession.

The national AIA had no real control over the existence of WAL groups and their relationship to women architects since they were linked to state and local chapters. However, time and the changing role of women in American society resulted in an organic reduction in the activity of most WAL groups. Record of WAL activities published in architectural journals and newspapers dwindles substantially throughout the 1980s. Many chapters were officially dissolved in the late 1980s and 1990s.

At the national level, the AIA adopted a five-year affirmative action plan that resolved to ensure equal employment practices, increase the enrollment of women in architecture schools, increase the number of women in the profession, increase membership and participation of women in the AIA at all levels, and promote public awareness of women architects. Despite the ambitious words, progress was slow over the next decade. Some local chapters partnered with groups outside of the AIA, such as New York’s Alliance of Women in Architecture (AWA), the Organization of Women Architects (OWA), and Women Architects, Landscape Architects, and Planners (WALAP), to provide a supportive community for women. Women in Architecture subcommittees and groups are now commonplace within the modern AIA.

== Women's auxiliary groups today ==
Today, AIA women's auxiliary groups are little known. The few that continue to operate are no longer associated with a specific AIA chapter. The Chicago group is now known as the Women’s Architectural League Foundation (WALF) and still supports scholarships for students at the Illinois Institute of Technology and the Universities of Illinois at Chicago and Urbana-Champaign with funds raised through their historic Chicago architecture tours. The Women's Architectural League of Portland was active as recently as 2016.

== List of chapters ==
(with dates of founding, incorporation, and dissolution when available)

Arizona
Women’s Architectural League of Central Arizona
California
Women’s Architectural League of Alameda County Architects, founded 1941
Cabrillo Chapter, the Women's Architectural League, incorporated 6 October 1966
Women's Architectural League of the Central Valley, founded 1952, incorporated 14 October 1958
The Coast Valleys, founded 1949
Women's Architectural League of the East Bay, founded 1941, dissolved 19 February 1981
Fresno Women’s Architectural League
Women's Architectural League, Los Angeles Chapter, incorporated 12 September 1952
Women's Architectural League, Monterey Bay chapter, incorporated 21 August 1957, dissolved 1 November 1984
Women's Architectural League of Orange County, incorporated 10 April 1958
Women's Architectural League of Pasadena, founded 1951, incorporated 28 May 1959, dissolved 4 June 1992
Women’s Architectural League of Sacramento
Women's Architectural League, Santa Barbara Chapter, incorporated 15 November 1963
Santa Clara Valley Chapter of the Women's Architectural League, incorporated 17 April 1958
Women's Architectural League of San Diego, founded, 1950, incorporated 3 October 1958
Women’s Architectural League of San Francisco, founded 1941
WAL Southern California, founded 1950
Women's Architectural League, San Joaquin Valley Chapter, founded 1951 incorporated 27 November 1964, dissolved 19 October 1984
Northern California Chapter of the Women's Architectural League, incorporated 21 February 1966
Inland California Chapter, the Women's Architectural League, incorporated 8 November 1968
Connecticut
Women’s Architectural League of Connecticut
Florida
Women’s Auxiliary, Florida Central Chapter AIA, founded 1955
Women's Architectural League allied to the Florida South Chapter American Institute of Architects, incorporated 5 August 1974
Hawaii
Women’s Architectural League of Hawaii, founded 1959
Idaho
Women’s Architectural League of Idaho
Illinois
Chicago Women’s Architectural League
Women’s Architectural League of the Northern Illinois AIA Chapter
Indiana
Women’s Architectural League of Indianapolis
Kansas
Women’s Auxiliary to the Wichita Chapter AIA
Kentucky
Women’s Architectural League of Central Kentucky, founded 1964
Louisiana
Women’s Auxiliary of the Baton Rouge AIA, founded 1959
Women’s Auxiliary of the Shreveport AIA, founded 1962
Women’s Auxiliary of the New Orleans AIA
Maryland
Women’s Architectural League of Baltimore, founded 1964
Michigan
Women’s Architectural League of Detroit
Women's Architectural League of Michigan, incorporated 1 October 1974, dissolved 1 October 2003
Minnesota
Women’s Architectural League of Minnesota
Mississippi
AIA Women’s Auxiliary of Mississippi
Missouri
Women’s Architectural League of St. Louis, founded 1961
Montana
Women’s Architectural League of Montana, founded 1961
Nevada
Women’s Architectural League of Reno
New Mexico
Women’s Architectural League, Albuquerque AIA Chapter
New York
Women’s Architectural Auxiliary of the New York AIA Chapter, founded June 1959
Women’s Architectural League of Rochester, founded 1969
North Carolina
Women’s Auxiliary of the Raleigh Council of Architects
Ohio
Women’s Architectural League of Ohio, founded 1966
Oklahoma
Women’s Architectural League of Oklahoma
Oregon
Women's Architectural League of Oregon, founded 1953
Women’s Architectural League of Portland, founded 1952
Texas
Women’s Architectural League of Austin, founded 1953
Dallas Women’s Architectural Auxiliary, founded 1942
Women’s Architectural Auxiliary of El Paso
Women’s Architectural Auxiliary of Houston, founded 1954
Women’s Architectural League of San Antonio
Utah
Utah Women’s Architectural League, founded 1952
Washington
Women’s Architectural League of Seattle, 1953
Women’s Architectural League of Spokane
Wisconsin
Women’s Architectural League of Madison
Women's Architectural League of Milwaukee, Inc., incorporated 15 January 1959, dissolved 30 September 1993
Women’s Architectural League of the Northeast Division, Wisconsin Chapter
