= Sandra Bromley =

Canadian artist

- Education: University of Alberta
- Notable work: Gun Sculpture
- Awards: Royal Canadian Academy of Arts (2012); Queen's Jubilee Medal (2012)
- Website: www.sandrabromley.com

Sandra Bromley RCA is a Canadian artist. She is noted for her anti-war and anti-violence artwork, most notably Gun Sculpture, co-created with Wallis Kendal. Her artwork has been exhibited at the United Nations and the presentation of the Nobel Peace Prize.

Bromley earned her BFA in 1979 from the University of Alberta. In 1997, she co-founded iHuman Youth Society with Kendal, a non-profit group that works with at-risk youth in Edmonton. She was inducted into the Royal Canadian Academy of Arts in 2012, receiving the Queen's Jubilee Medal the same year.

== The Art of Peacemaking: The Gun Sculpture ==
Bromley and collaborator Wallis Kendal co-created The Gun Sculpture, a five-tonne sculpture that was unveiled in Edmonton in early 2000. It was a vision of the iHuman 2000 Peace Initiative. and took two years to build. The Canadian Millennium Bureau and the UN Department for Disarmament Affairs provided funding, as well as private donations. Composed of 7,000 deactivated weapons such as landmines, machine-guns and knives donated to the artists by Canadian and international sources, the walk-in structure resembles a prison cell. The sculpture is paired with multimedia components depicting victims of war, and crimes of violence like domestic abuse. As described by a UN report on small arms, the sculpture contributes to "an understanding of the ways in which civilians including children [are] affected by such weapons". Its effect is to "force us to think about violence" and "what we can do to contribute to the culture of peace."

Since its debut, the work has been toured around the world including the Expo 2000 world's fair in Hanover, Germany, the Headquarters of the United Nations in New York City, the Canadian War Museum in Ottawa, and the Nobel Peace Prize Centennial Celebration in Seoul, South Korea.
