= Qualifications-Based Selection =

Qualifications-Based Selection (QBS) is a procurement process established by the United States Congress as a part of the Brooks Act and further developed as a process for public agencies to use for the selection of architectural and engineering services for public construction projects. It is a competitive contract procurement process whereby consulting firms submit qualifications to a procuring entity (owner) who evaluates and selects the most qualified firm, and then negotiates the project scope of work, schedule, budget, and consultant fee.

Crucially, under a QBS procurement, the cost of the work (price) is not considered when making the initial selection of the best or most appropriate provider of the professional services required. Fees for services will be negotiated, however, following selection and before contracting.

Many states in the US have adopted their own versions of the Brooks Act, commonly referred to as "Little Brooks Acts" or "mini-Brooks Acts." For example, Georgia has adopted QBS as appropriate under its state law. Practical application in Georgia state construction procurements has extended the use of QBS into several areas of professional construction services other than architecture, engineering, land surveying, and landscape architecture. These areas have included project and program management, construction management at-risk (CM/GC), design-build, and building commissioning. Other states have adopted varying interpretations.

Public owners have developed policies and procedures for Qualifications-Based Selection to govern procurements in which price is not the determining factor in selection. Price will be taken into consideration under QBS but not for the purposes of the public owner's determination of the most suitable and qualified provider of construction services.

== Impetus of QBS ==
Qualifications-Based Selection was developed because public owners lacked procurement tools for services for which price competition made no sense. For example, creative services cannot be fairly priced before the creative process has taken place. An architect can hardly "hard bid" (submit a firm price for) a project when part of the cost to the architectural firm (and therefore its needs for compensation) will be determined later in the process of discovery of the owner's needs and intentions.

Further, lowest cost is widely recognized as the poorest criterion for service selection when quality and professional creativity are sought. An apt analogy from outside of the construction arena often cited is in the area of medical care: Nobody willingly chooses a surgeon based upon a doctor's willingness to perform an operation most cheaply.

Whereas private owners can use common sense to procure services based upon an evaluation of sources of greatest delivery of value, public owners, under political scrutiny, have been bound to the presumed objectivity of selections based on lowest price, even if a realistic price could not be determined. Such situations have led to unintended consequences, including poor service and quality, excessive and expensive change orders, and litigation over disputes.

Adapting to political reality, known abuses, tight budgets, and increasing expectations on the part of taxpayers for quality with integrity, the public owner has developed selection procedures consciously intended to enhance the probability of value while guarding against unfairness and abuse.

Crucial to QBS is the methodology and documentation the public owner uses to ensure competition without consideration of price. An essential element is the use of a selection committee, comprising a number of knowledgeable people of unquestioned integrity, to make the evaluations. The selection committee is charged by the owner with fairly evaluating the qualifications and, often, the ideas for project execution offered by competing firms.

== Typical QBS process ==
Under QBS, the owner would publicly advertise a project and describe it in significant detail in a published "Request for Qualifications" (RFQ). The RFQ should contain selection criteria explicitly in order for firms to judge the likelihood of being selected. The owner would invite firms to submit their qualifications for evaluation by the selection committee, which must then rank-order the firms using the published selection criteria in making their evaluations.

Commonly, the initial evaluation of qualifications submittals will lead to a shortlist of three to five firms that the selection committee judges to be well qualified to perform the work. Through an additional "Request for Proposals" (RFP), these shortlisted firms may be invited to submit more detailed ideas about the specific project at hand. The selection committee would also evaluate responses to the RFP, and often invite firms to interview in person.

Ultimately, the selection committee will provide the owner with a final rank ordering of the shortlisted firms. The owner would then invite the top-ranked firm to enter into negotiations to establish compensation and other contractual terms. If negotiations are not successful and the parties cannot agree to a contract, the owner would dismiss the top-ranked firm and invite the second-ranked firm to negotiate, and so on until a contract is concluded.

== Electronic Submittal Process ==
Until recently the evaluations of qualifications submittals was a completely manual process. This meant that each firm submitting on specific projects would typically need to include multiple copies of the requested items for each selection committee member as well as a copy that would remain on file with the agency. With the release of GSA's Standard Form (SF) 330 in 2004, agencies now have the capability to request that a submittal be performed in an entirely paperless environment with the use of an Electronic Submittal Process (ESP). Beyond a simple document management system, a true ESP will extract essential information from submitted items, maintain lists of projects and specific evaluation criteria, and provide tools for committees to objectively compare, score and rank firms in an efficient manner.
