= Brooks Act =

1972 American procurement legislation

The Brooks Act, also known as the Selection of Architects and Engineers statute, is a United States federal law passed in 1972 that requires that the U.S. Federal Government select engineering and architecture firms based upon their competency, qualifications and experience rather than by price.

== Method ==
The method described would be to evaluate all possible candidates and narrow them down to the three best choices. Then the selection process would commence negotiations with the firm deemed most qualified. If the State and firm are unable to agree on a fair and equitable price for their services, the State would then cease talks with that firm and move to the firm deemed second most qualified. If the State would be unable to agree with that firm, they would move to the third in a similar fashion. If the State is unable to agree on a price with that firm, they would be required to open up their selection criteria to more firms.

== Still potential for selection based on price ==
While the intent is for the State to select the firm that is most qualified and should produce the best results as a result of this fact, there remains the potential to still make a selection based upon price. If you cannot reach a "Fair & Reasonable Price" vs. your estimate, you move on to the next best technical proposal.

== See also ==
- Qualifications-Based Selection
