= Gh3* =

Canadian architecture firm

gh3*

Practice information
- Key architects: Pat Hanson (Founding Partner and Principal); Raymond Chow (Principal)
- Founded: 2006
- Location: Toronto ON. Canada

Significant works and honors
- Awards: Governor General's Medal in Architecture (2008, 2010, 2018, 2020, 2022, 2026) Ontario Association of Architects Design Excellence Award (2006, 2008, 2010, 2020); RAIC Award of Excellence for Innovation in Architecture (2019); Canadian Architect Award of Excellence (2011, 2014, 2016, 2018, 2022, 2024, 2025) City of Toronto Urban Design Award (2007, 2008, 2011, 2013, 2021)

gh3* is a Canadian architecture, urbanism, and landscape design practice based in Toronto, led by founding principal Pat Hanson and Raymond Chow.

Employing both architects and landscape designers, gh3* has worked on a variety of projects including private residences, pavilions, public parks, commercial buildings, and civic infrastructure.

== Notable projects ==
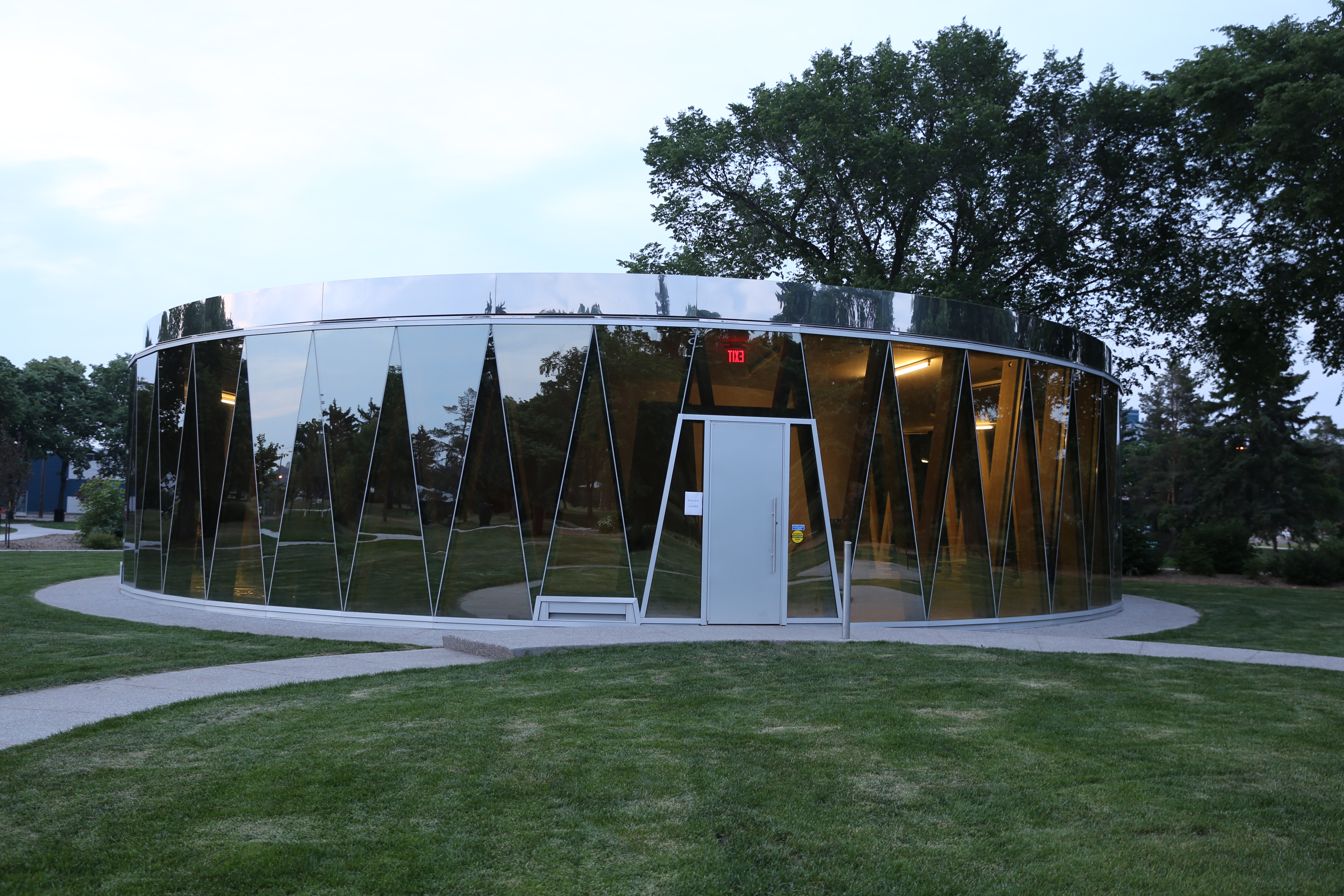
Borden Park Pavilion (Edmonton, Alberta)

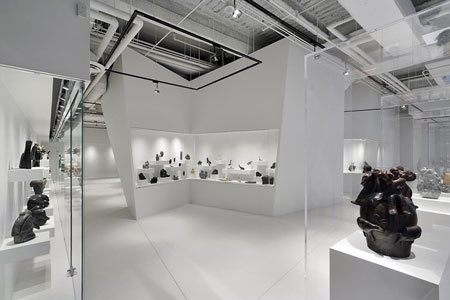
Canadian Museum of Inuit Art (Toronto, Ontario)

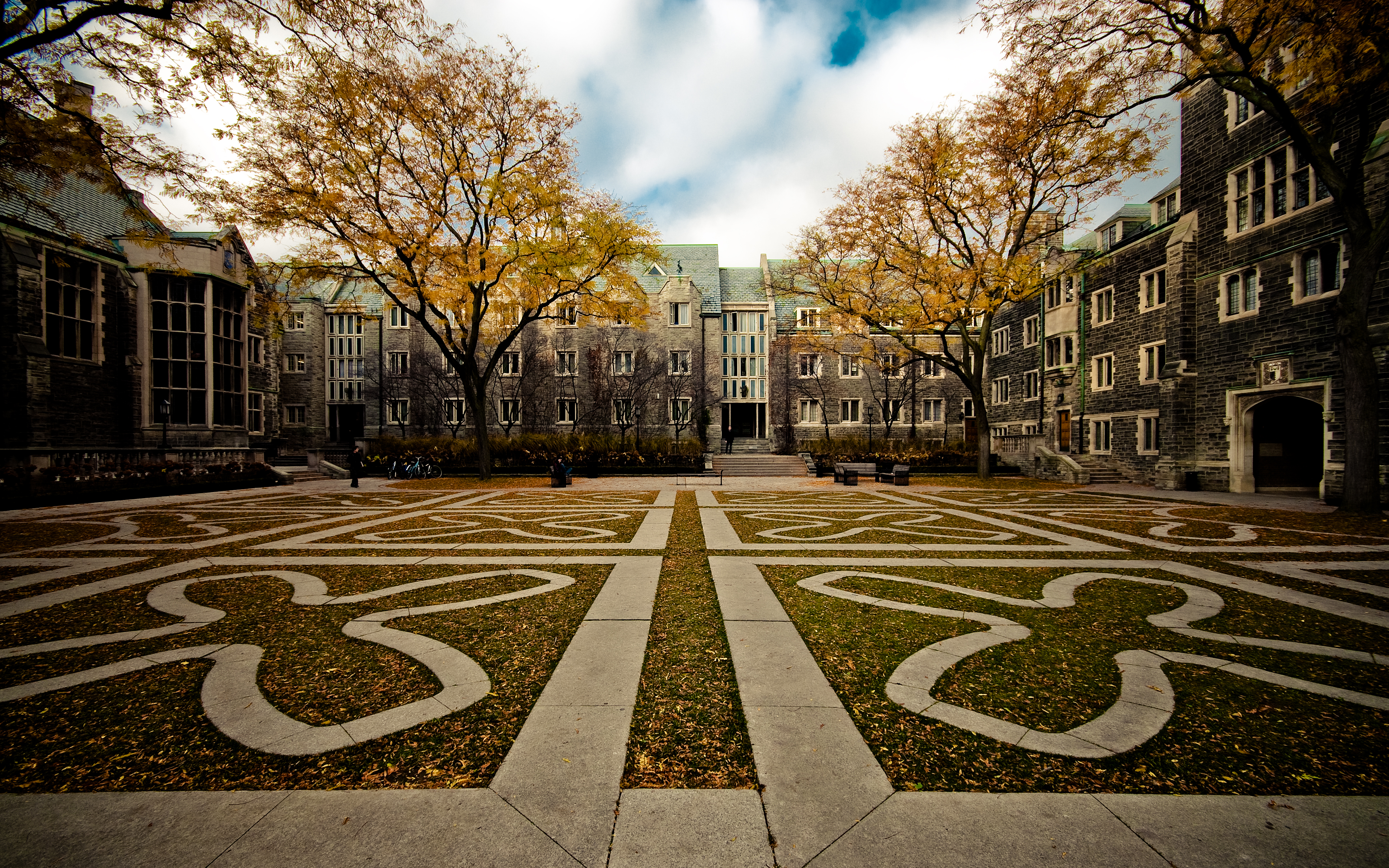
Trinity College Quadrangle (Toronto, Ontario)

=== Borden Park Natural Swimming Pool ===
Replacing the existing public pool at Borden Park in Edmonton, AB, Borden Park Natural Swimming Pool is the first public chemical-free outdoor pool in Canada. The project included the creation of a central pool as well as a single-story building housing changing rooms and bathrooms, and a landscaped area with sandy beaches. The building's exterior is made up of gabion basket walls filled with dark Alberta limestone and has a flat roof. The Borden Park Natural Swimming Pool was awarded the 2014 Canadian Architect Award of Excellence and 2019 RAIC Award of Excellence for Innovation in Architecture.

=== Borden Park Pavilion ===
Selected by the City of Edmonton after a 2011 design competition, gh3*'s concept for the Borden Park Pavilion incorporated the site's history as an amusement park and curving pathways. They built a single-story cylindrical structure to house the park's amenities and walkway surrounding it. The exterior is covered in triangular sheets of reflective curtainwall glazing while the interior has a similar triangular motif. The project was awarded the Governor General's Medal in Architecture in 2018.

=== Boathouse Studio ===
In 2010, gh3* completed Boathouse Studio. Located on Stoney Lake, in Southern Ontario, the photography studio is a glass cube on the edge of the water. The building uses a deep water exchange system for low energy heating and cooling year round. Boathouse Studio received the Governor General's Medal in Architecture (2010).

=== Stormwater Facility ===
The Stormwater Facility, on Toronto's Lakeshore Boulevard in the West Don Lands area, was commissioned by Waterfront Toronto and Toronto Water. Completed in 2020, the facility includes a stormwater reservoir, a treatment plant, and a landscape of channels and gutters linking the two. It was constructed from exposed, cast-in-place concrete.

=== Kathleen Andrews Transit Garage ===
Kathleen Andrews Transit Garage is a bus maintenance and storage facility for Edmonton Transit Services. It is 540,000 sf with five skylit stairways that are topped by topographic installations by German artist, Thorsten Goldberg. The building's corrugated stainless steel exterior is made of freezer panels, normally used for cold storage facilities.

=== Windermere Fire Station #31 ===
Windermere Fire Station in Edmonton's most notable feature is a pitched roof, with a subtle curve. As part of the City of Edmonton's sustainability commitments, the station is powered by a rooftop solar array and geothermal heating and cooling, making it the first net-zero emissions building in Edmonton.
