= Natural swimming pool =

Man-made chemical-free swimming pool

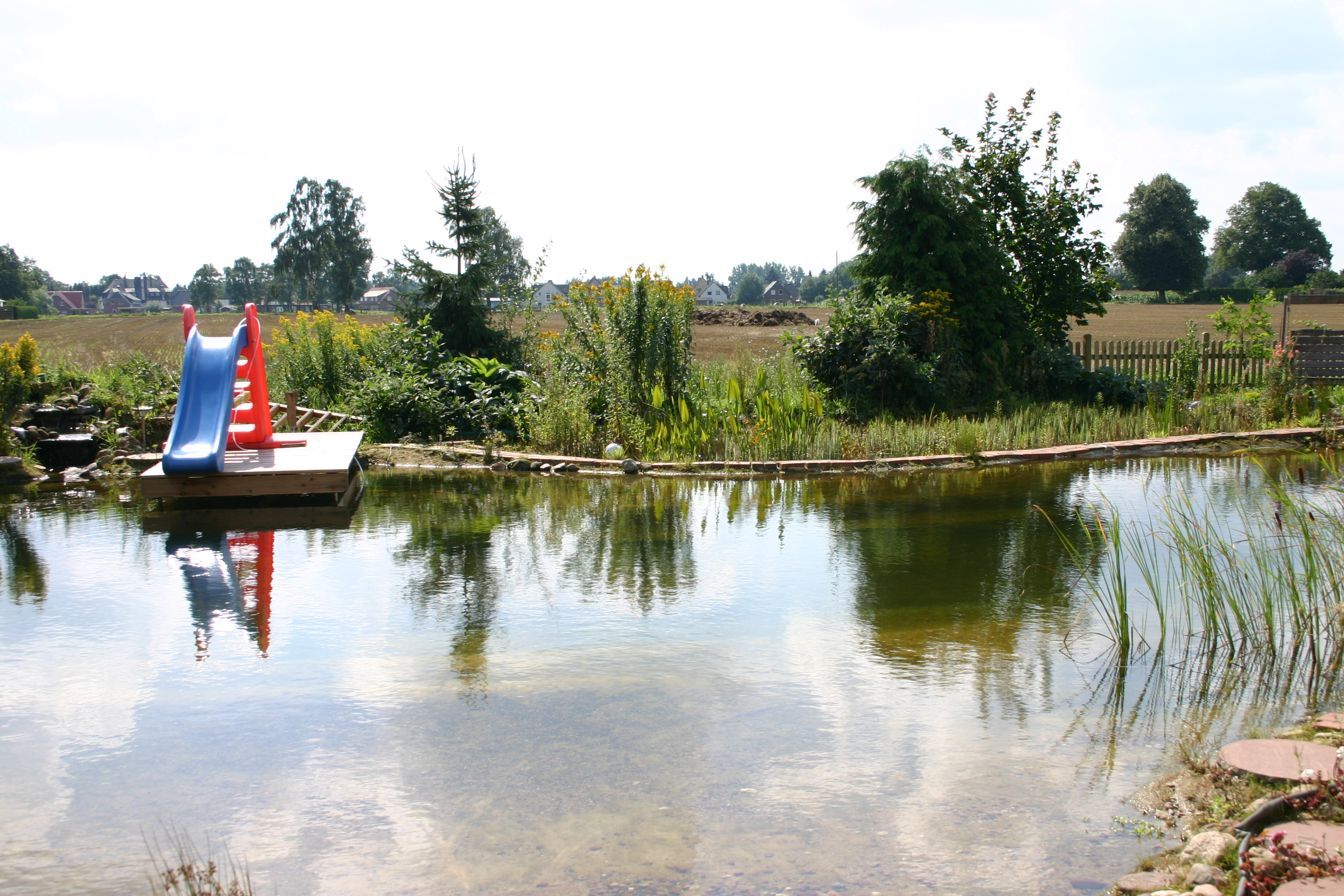
A natural swimming pool in Germany designed to appear as a part of the surrounding natural environment.

A natural swimming pool, also called eco pool or chemical-free pool, is a type of swimming pool that operates without an array of sanitation chemicals and that can be built with a minimum of materials. Common in Europe, this swimming pool type leans toward an ethos of building with nature and blending into the natural landscape around it and thus may use gravel stone and clay instead of concrete or fiberglass, and aquatic plants in a filtration area instead of chemicals and mechanically-complex filtration systems for pool sanitation.

The plants in a natural pool's filtration area planted hydroponically (placed no deeper than 30 cm.) create a low-cost maintenance system for the pool. A conventional pool's complex sanitation and filtration system would often cost its owner more than ten times the maintenance cost spent on a natural swimming pool. Additionally, a natural swimming pool requires only a small amount of management hours and does not require regular draining.

Apart from economic reasons, a natural swimming pool seeks to avoid chemicals such as chlorine that can irritate a pool user's eyes and skin, provide a natural aesthetic to a yard, or welcome more wildlife into a given environment, among other reasons.

== History ==
In the 1980s, Austria opened the first private natural swimming pool in Europe. In 1998, Germany opened Europe's first public natural swimming pool.

In the United States, the first reported natural public swimming pool was completed in 2015 in Minneapolis after ten years of building. The superintendent of the Minneapolis Park and Recreation Board said that the pool is "part of what keeps our Park system the number one park system in the United States," adding that "It's better for the environment and for users." The Minneapolis Board also reported that Europe had, as of that year, already 20,000 public and private natural swimming pools. The Minneapolis pool can hold up to 500,000 gallons of water, recycled every 12 hours.

In 2019, Canada opened the first natural public swimming pool in the country, built by gh3*, in Edmonton.

== Construction ==
=== Water source ===
A natural pool would usually have a natural water source. In one such pool, rainwater is allowed to run down an olive orchard hill through to its filtration pool filled with plants, while other natural pools use bore water.

=== Filtration area ===
Construction of a natural swimming pool separates the filtration area (where the aquatic plants are placed) from the swimming area. Aside from providing dragonflies and other aquatic life an ecologically diverse small habitat, this filtration area's shallow-water plants—placed at one side of the pool or around it—are not only set there to boost the pool water's oxygen but also to provide support to the beneficial bacteria (decomposer organisms) at the plants' roots as well as to the aquatic life consuming the dross, the potentially unhealthy organisms or contaminants, and the excess nutrients in the water in both the filtration and swimming parts of the pool. This system mimics the same natural system that would present in a stream, lake or wetland.

The Canadian natural pool built by gh3* uses both a biological-mechanical system in a sand and stone pond and the wetland and gravel filter it constructed as a hydro botanic pond, filling this latter with zooplankton. Adjacent to these ponds, a granular filter PO4 adsorption unit was installed, running along the gabion walls of the pool, thus allowing the water to laterally circulate from one end to the other.

==== Filtration area plant distribution ====
In the design of the plant zone for the pool's filtration, which may take up 30-70% of the total pool area, taller aquatic plants are positioned near the edge of the zone's water, while submerged and floating aquatic vegetation would occupy the gradually deeper water area near the border with the pool's swimming zone. The shallow area with the tall plants provides a habitat for invertebrates that eat mosquito larvae.

In one natural pool, the following plants are used: water lily, water hyacinth, phragmites australis, caltha palustris, and mentha aquatica for purification, and hippuris vulgaris and waterweed for oxygenation.

=== Natural and synthetic materials used ===
To augment its ecological intent of using only natural materials as much as possible, a natural swimming pool's construction would avoid a conventional swimming pool's need for an iron framework beneath cement walls, meant to prevent the soil around the pool from caving in, simply by digging the pool with sloping sides. A layer of bentonite clay, ethylene propylene diene monomer, RPE-reinforced polyethylene or enhanced PVC (fish- and plant-safe polyvinyl chloride) liner is then applied to seal the soil before cleaned gravel stones are placed on top of the walls. The gravel layer also becomes a habitat for beneficial bacteria that help biodegrade leaves and other natural materials that have sunk to the bottom of the pool. Sand may also be added.

To help protect the pool's sides, cobblestone steps or a cantilevered board may be placed for access into and out of the pool.

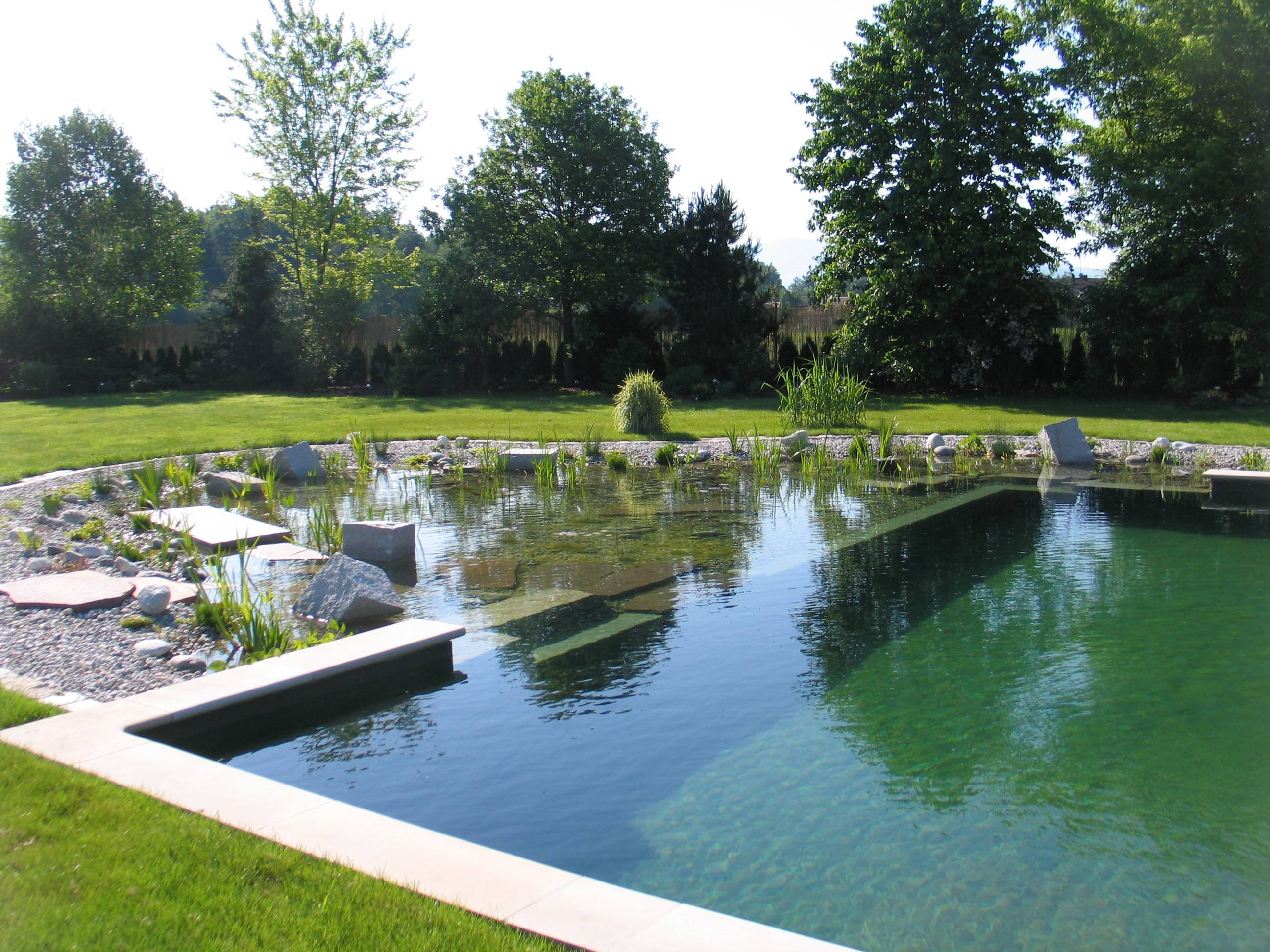
A natural swimming pool not designed to resemble a natural body of water.

=== Option to build with concrete ===
Other builders of a natural pool may still opt to use cement or Rastra blocks. Although a cement pool would be less eco-friendly than a pool built with gravel and stone, the plant-based filtration system that would be used to operate the pool would still reduce chemical and energy usage.

== Maintenance ==
=== Water circulation and aeration ===
To enable the roots of the plants in a natural pool's filtration area to clean the pool, the pool's water must continuously circulate. The water must also be aerated every now and then to address the oxygen needs of the water organisms. Lack of circulation and aeration would produce water stagnation, which would in turn nurture foul-smelling anaerobic bacteria.

==== Water circulation ====
To keep a natural pool's water circulating, it can be channeled to the plant zone with a pump, ideally through tubes buried 18 inches deep in the soil, underwater aeration being more energy-efficient than swimming-area-to-plant-area constructed waterfalls, in the case of pools where the filtration area is below the swimming area.

Alternatively, in pools where the swimming area is higher than the filtration area, the water may simply be allowed to stream through the biological filters into a nearby regeneration basin containing aquatic plants rooted in layers of limestone and granite during the recycling process. The new fresh water can then be pumped back into the pool's swimming area, which can also be vacuumed daily.

In some pools the border wall between the swimming area and the regeneration area may be below the water line, thus allowing the pool's water to freely run from one end to the other. However, "(moving) the water through (a cascade) improves the speed of purification through the planted regeneration area and onto the skimmers," says one service expert.

==== Aeration ====
Underwater aeration presumably circulates water more effectively, as it diffuses air at the pool’s bottom. An aerator can be built using a small air compressor and strong tubes that connect to a diffuser that bubbles air through the water. A brass manifold can be connected to the compressor to regulate the air pumped into the pool. An Ohio-based pond-and-lake-restoration company suggests natural pool aeration twice a day—one in the morning, where oxygen demand is greatest, and another in the evening.

=== Algae growth prevention ===
It had been observed that when water lilies and other plants emerge to shade the water, algae blooms decline. The promotion of plant growth as well as the addition of plants deter algae from spreading and eliminates phosphorus, thus maintaining a lower pH (5.5 to 6.5). The addition of plants is always the simplest remedy against algal growth as a way of out-competing the algae's demand for nutrients; it is also the least risky to the filtration zone's aquatic ecosystem. Fertilizers and urine are the two primary sources of the nutrient that algae feed on, so a constant monitoring of the pool's ph level would be an additional safeguard. Pool users may also be reminded to use the toilet and shower before getting into the water. The pool's aeration schedule can also be augmented in order to stimulate biological activity.

== Regulation ==
While no regulation yet exists for the construction and maintenance of natural swimming pools, the International Organization for Natural Bathing Waters (IOB) was established in Germany in 2009 to set guidelines for the building and maintenance of such structures. As of 2011, it represents 600 individuals and companies from around the world involved in the planning and construction of natural swimming pools. The organization also consults with political organizations and governments and with local organizations with a similar thrust. It is a registered organization with headquarters in Bremen, and is also the exclusive international distributor of DANA, a web-based database system. DANA offers all the features of effective quality management for swimming pools with biologically treated water.
