= Arthur Erickson =

Canadian architect (1924–2009)

Arthur Charles Erickson OC
- Born: June 14, 1924; Vancouver, British Columbia
- Died: May 20, 2009 (aged 84); Vancouver, British Columbia
- Education: University of British Columbia; McGill School of Architecture
- Occupation: Architect
- Awards: Companion of the Order of Canada; RAIC Gold Medal; AIA Gold Medal et al (see list)
- Buildings: Simon Fraser University; Canadian Chancery; Robson Square; Roy Thomson Hall; Museum of Anthropology at UBC; California Plaza et al (see list)

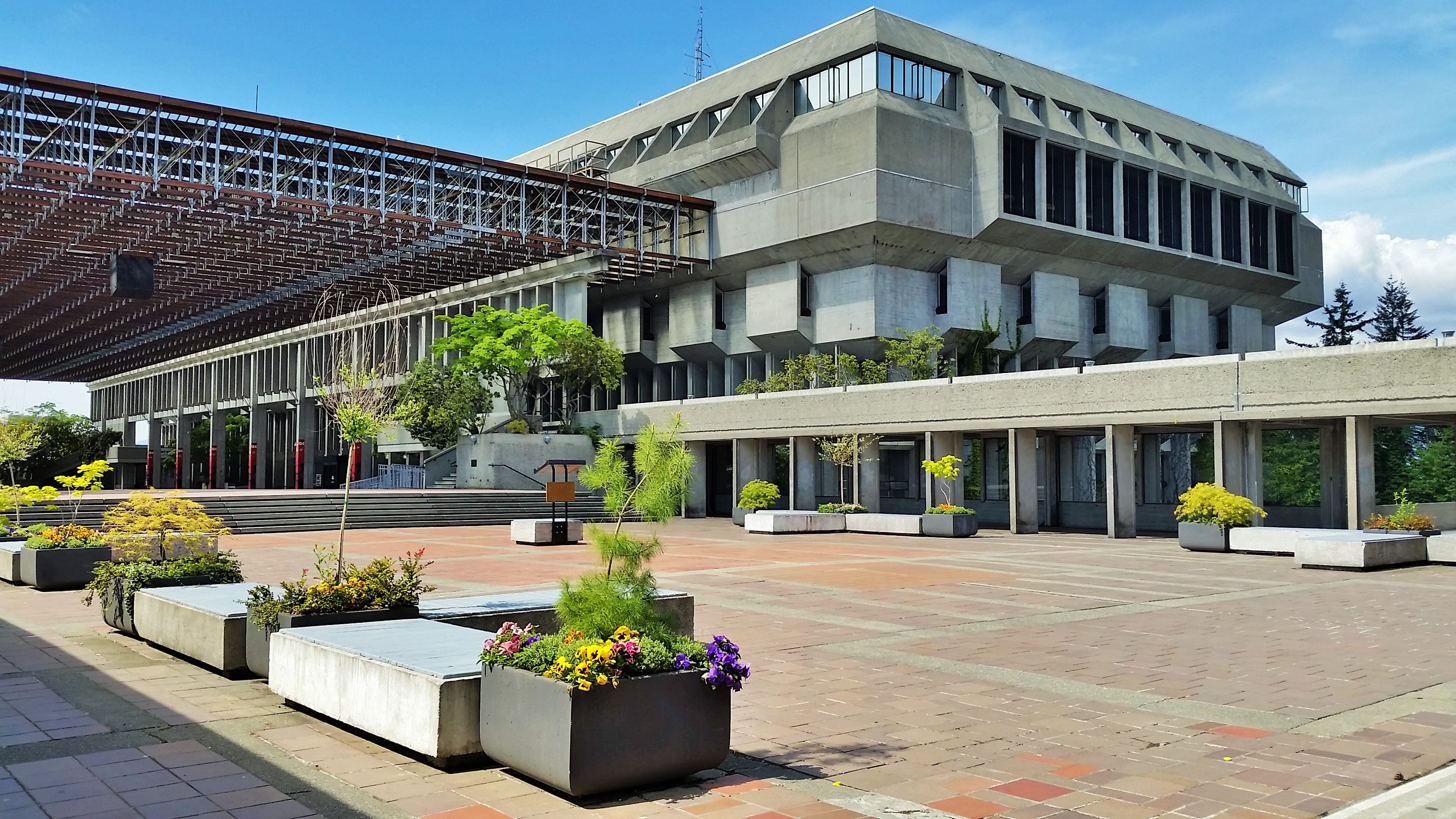
Simon Fraser University

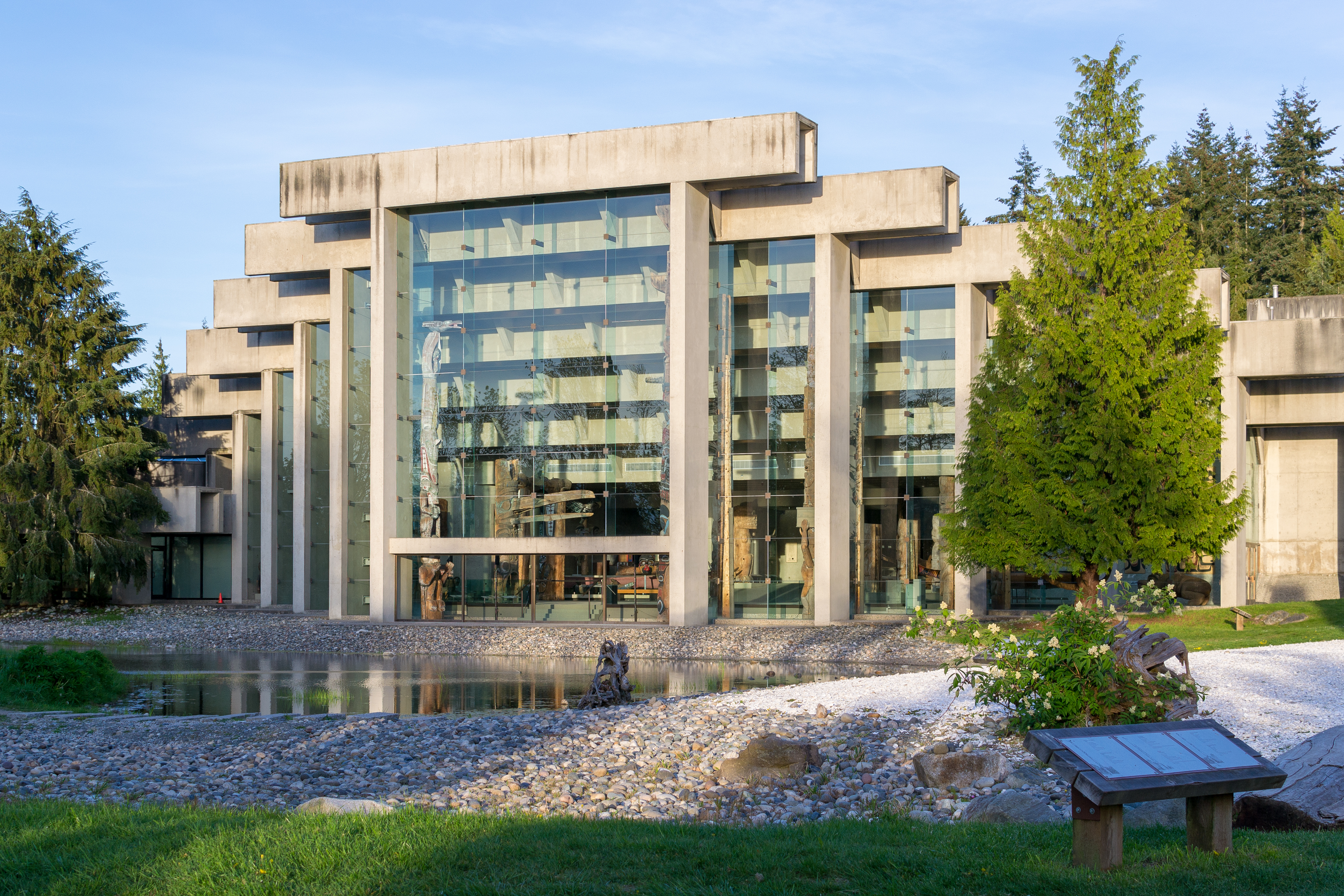
The Museum of Anthropology

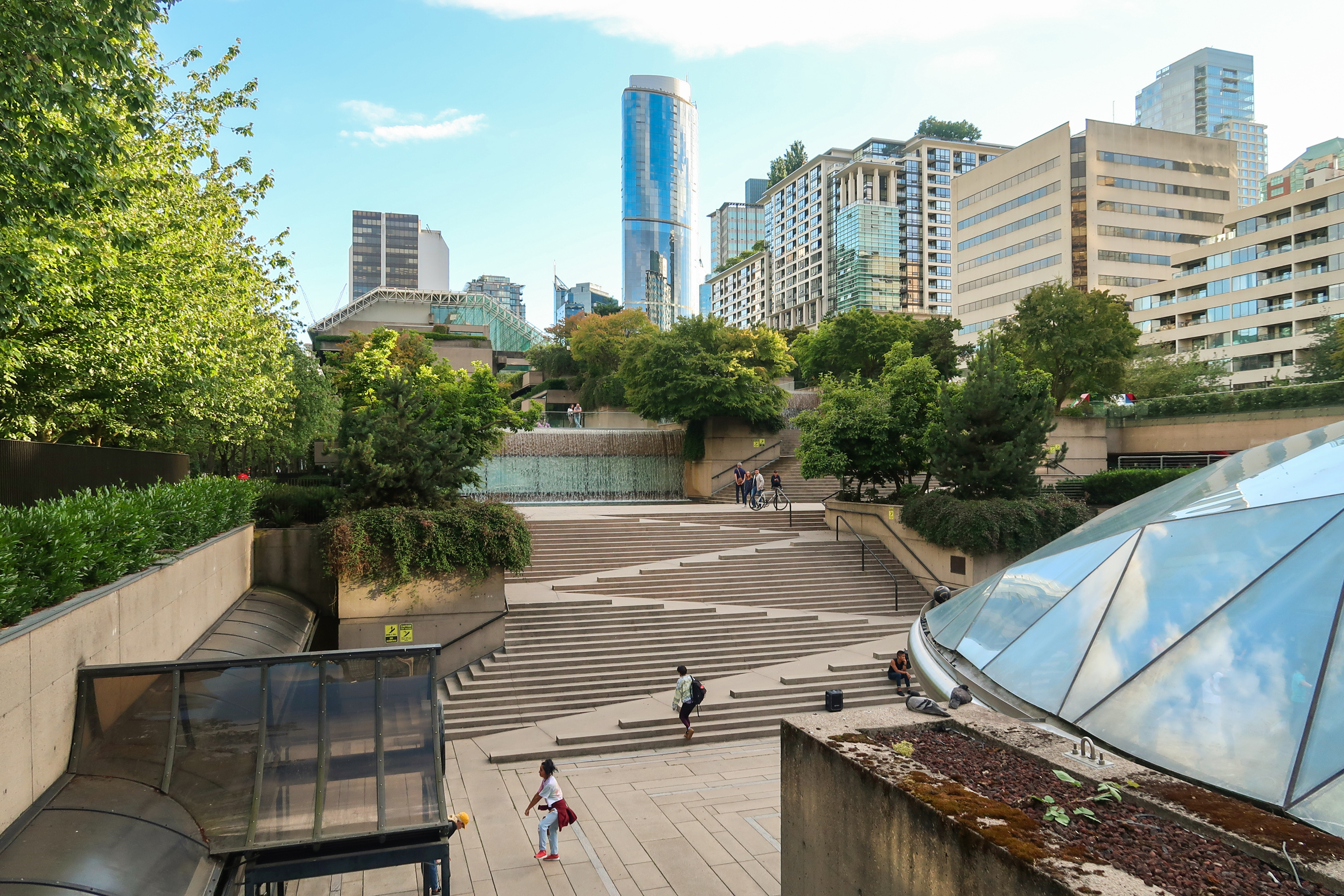
Robson Square

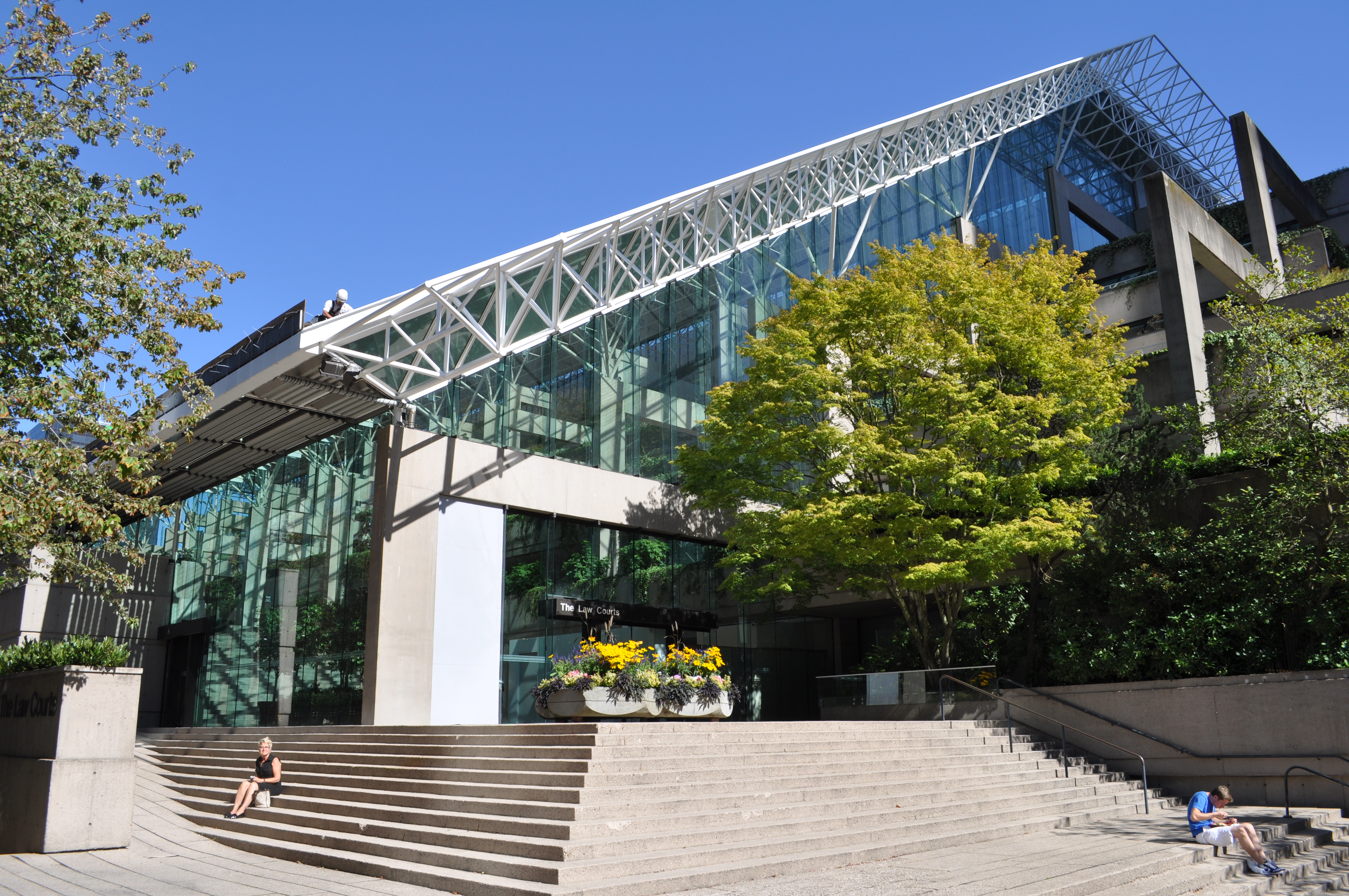
Vancouver Law Courts

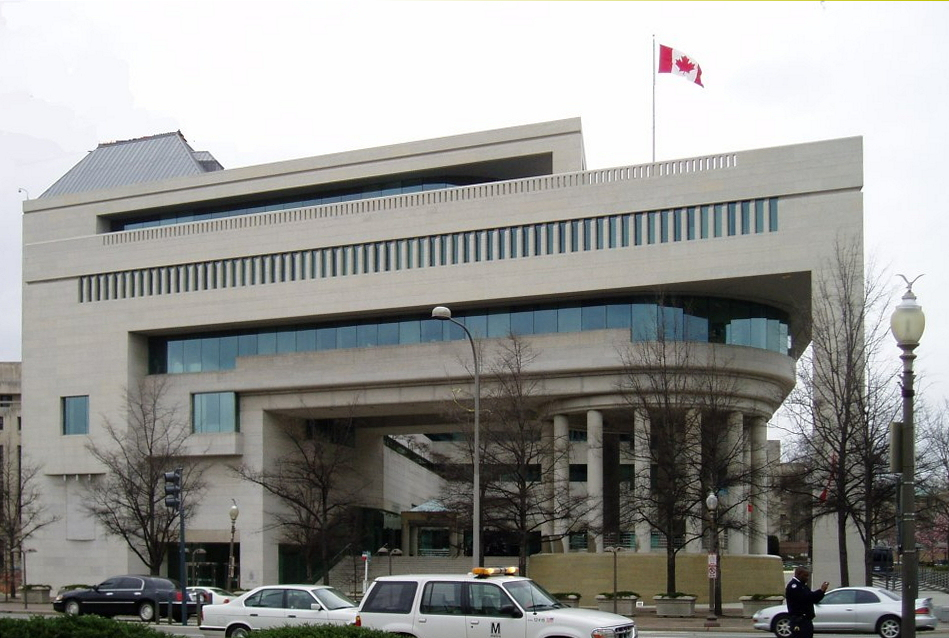
Canadian Chancery, Washington

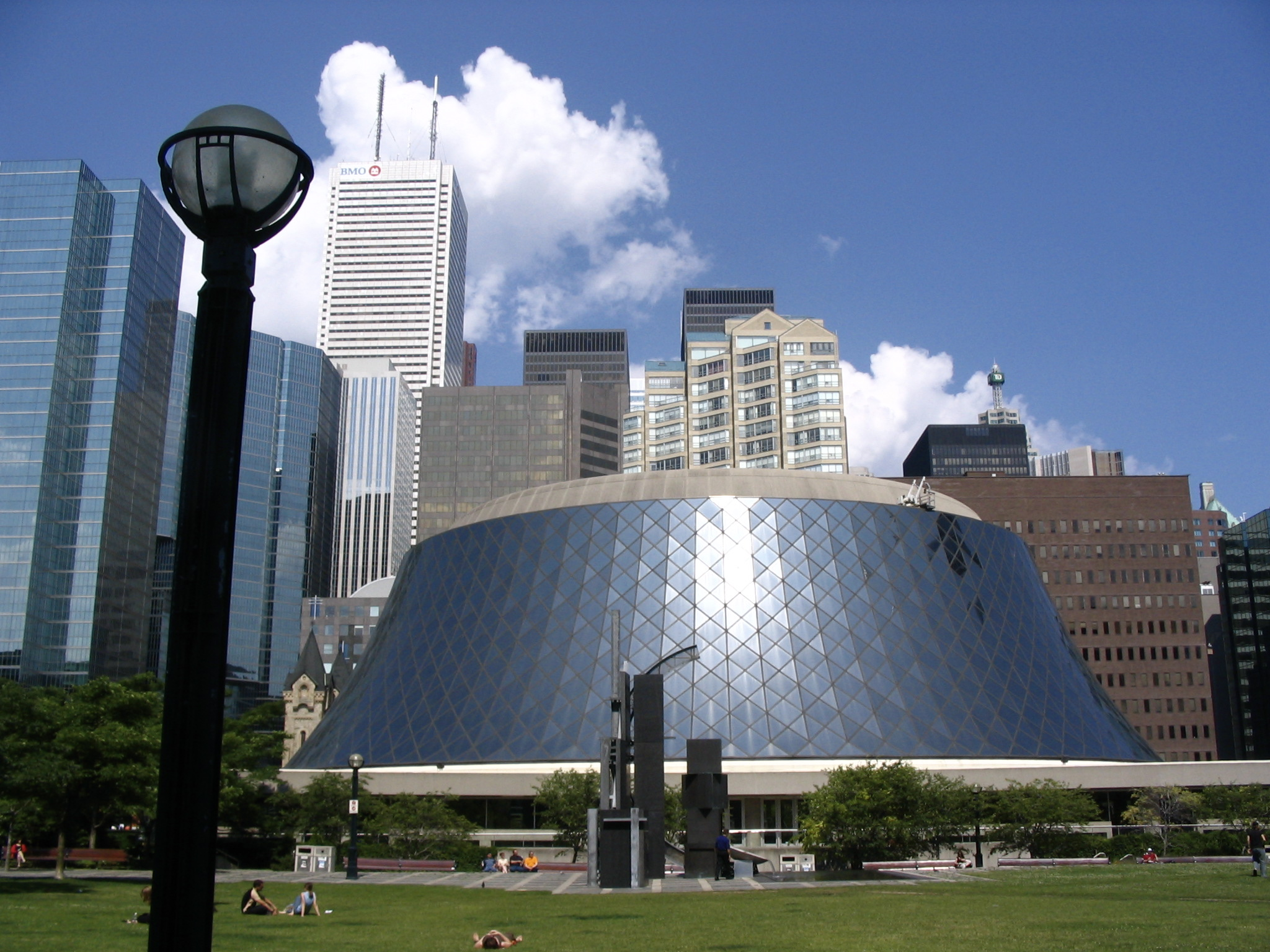
Roy Thomson Hall, Toronto

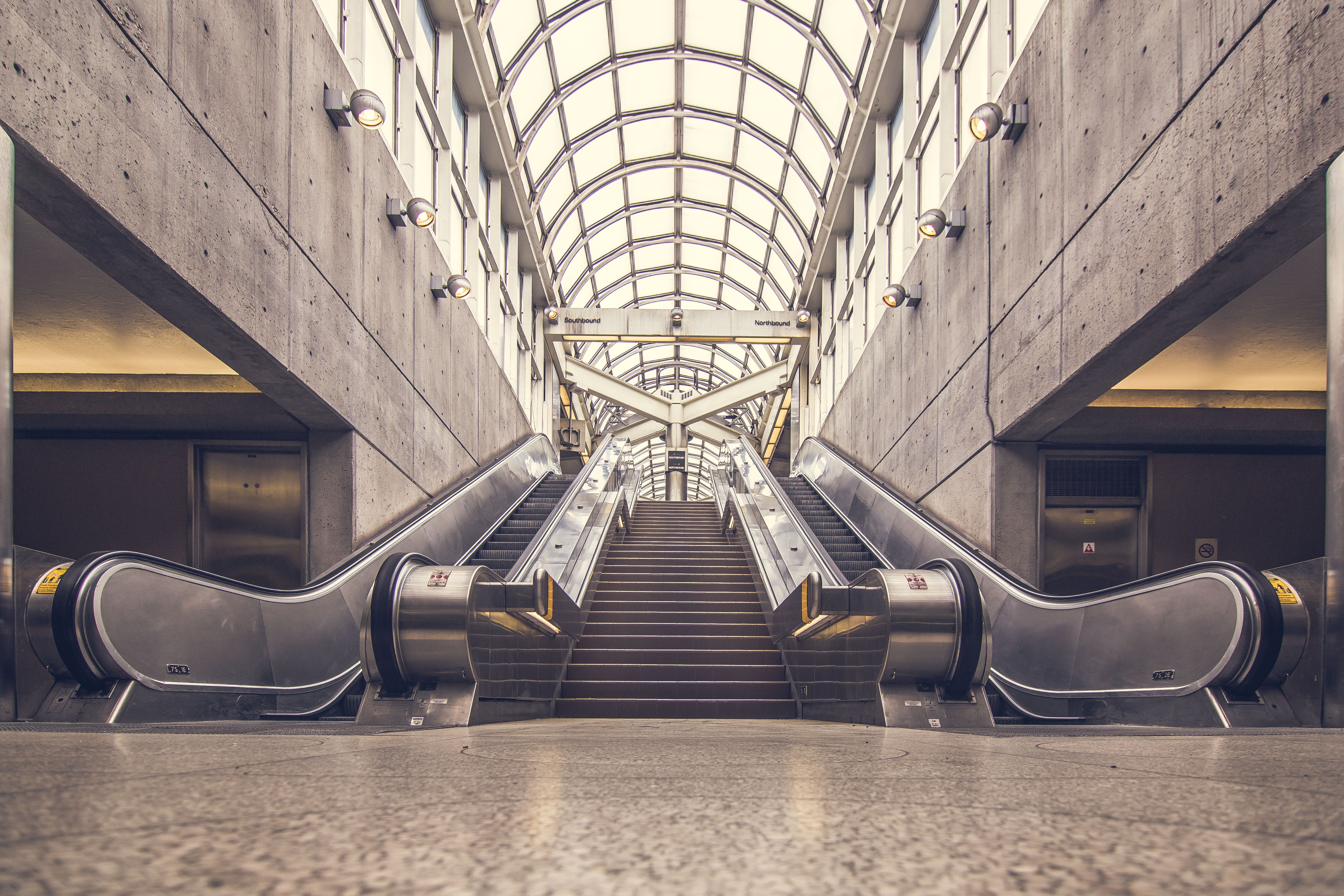
Yorkdale Subway Station, Toronto

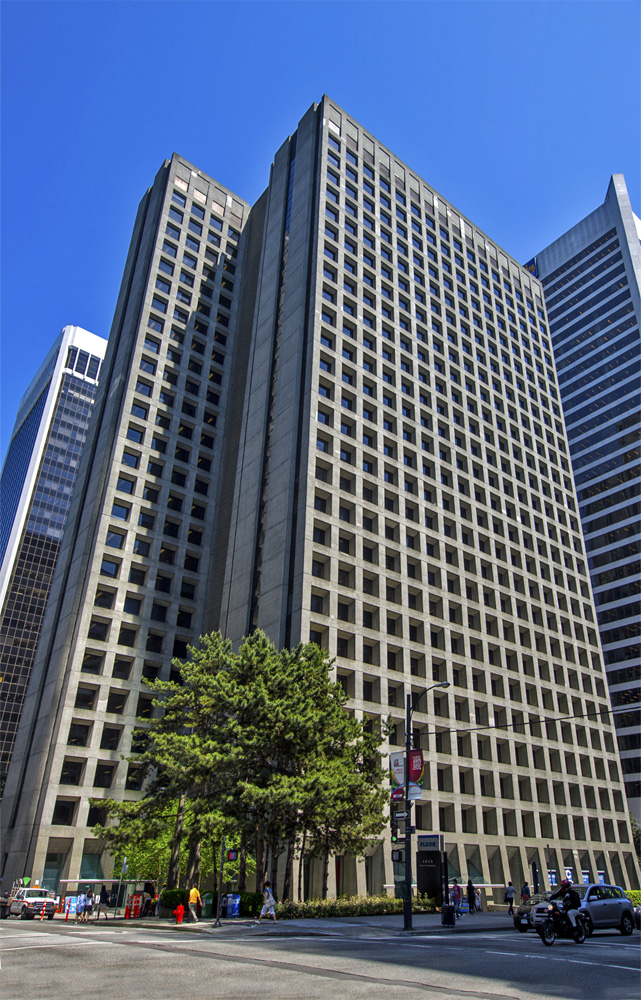
Arthur Erickson Place

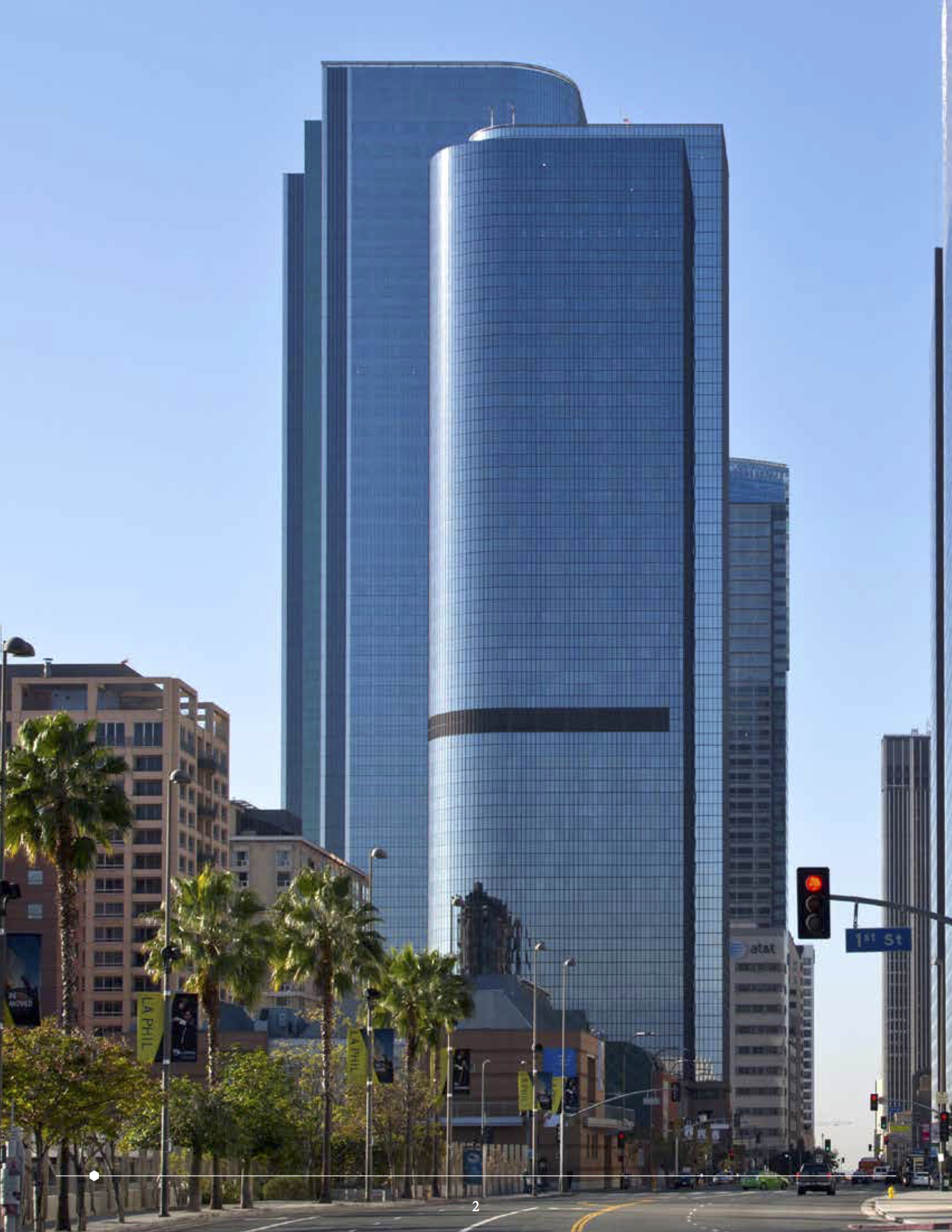
California Plaza

Arthur Charles Erickson CC FAIA FRAIC Hon FRIBA (June 14, 1924 – May 20, 2009) was a Canadian architect and urban planner. He is known as one of Canada's most influential architects and was the only Canadian architect to win the American Institute of Architects AIA Gold Medal. When told of Erickson's award, Philip Johnson said, "Arthur Erickson is by far the greatest architect in Canada, and he may be the greatest on this continent."

== Early life and education ==
Erickson was born in Vancouver, British Columbia, on June 14, 1924, one of two children of Oscar Erickson and Myrtle Chatterson. As a boy, he began painting; at 16, his paintings received public recognition, and he considered becoming an artist. During World War II he served in the Army University Corps, in India and Malaya. He then intended to go into the Diplomatic corps; he changed his mind when he saw an image of Frank Lloyd Wright's desert house, Taliesin West. He studied at the University of British Columbia, and the McGill University School of Architecture. While at McGill, he went to see Wright, who invited him to spend a year studying at Taliesen. But Erickson won a travelling scholarship, awarded to the best graduating student; after graduating in 1950, he spent three years in the Middle East, Scandinavia and Europe—particularly Italy. His first job was in London, as assistant to Sigmund Freud's son, the architect Ernst L. Freud. He then spent ten years teaching at the University of Oregon and the University of British Columbia (UBC), during which time he designed some of British Columbia's most important houses–Canadian Homes Magazine called his 1959 Filberg House "Canada's most fabulous house". In 1962, after a few years at various Vancouver firms, he joined with Geoffrey Massey to found Erickson/Massey Architects. In 1963, Erickson and Massey submitted the winning design for Simon Fraser University.

== Significant works ==
=== Simon Fraser University (Burnaby, BC) ===
Simon Fraser University sits atop Burnaby Mountain, at Greater Vancouver's eastern edge, 1,214 feet above sea level. Its scale is reminiscent of the utopian designs of 18th-century French architects but provides a balance between its context and the structural ambitions of the 1960s Modernist period. The unfinished concrete blends in with the surrounding geography in colour but not in shape. When viewed from above, the campus forms a geometric contrast to the nearby mountains but it's open to its natural surroundings and does not interfere with the site's spectacular views. While Erickson had 900 acres to work with, he kept the campus tight and left the rest for meadow and playing fields. The design features a covered plaza with massive skylights. The campus is landscaped to provide numerous small spaces for study and, in its centre, Erickson placed a large rectangular pool containing a block of Fraser River jade. Perhaps most significantly, the academic disciplines are not isolated in separate buildings; the campus is a quadrangle designed so that people have to cross paths and interact with each other. Tagged "the instant university" because it was completed in two years, the design was met with international acclaim, with one critic writing that it "answered questions about the nature of education". Everything about the project was eventful; in an interview with Veery journal, 1997 – 1999, Erickson reflected on it all: "And then I won a competition from Simon Fraser University, and that really started my career. So everything . . . you know, there’s always a peak, and then always, what can I say, an underground, fault, in that peak that would bring me down to earth. I know when Simon Fraser opened, it was really a triumphant opening because we brought the whole thing in on time, given two years to design the whole thing and build it at the same time, and it was a trial by fire, but we made it, and then we were called in to the board of governors, and my partner and I assumed to be congratulated on what we had accomplished. Instead, we had a terrible dressing down by the board, and we were just so defeated that we said, 'What should we do, jump off a cliff now or somehow persist?' And we did. And gradually, more things came to us, and that was the beginning. And it was always up and then down and then up and down.”

=== The MacMillan Bloedel Building (Vancouver, BC) ===
In 1965, Canadian forestry giant MacMillan Bloedel was in the process of designing its new head office, on Georgia Street in downtown Vancouver. The company had proposals from several firms and asked Erickson to revise them. Erickson declined but said, if they gave him a month, he’d give them a new design. Four weeks later, he presented the design for what would become one of the city’s most prominent buildings, and one of Canada's finest examples of Brutalist architecture. The MacMillan Bloedel Building, which Erickson described as "a Doric building in its starkness and simplicity", is a 27- storey cast-in-place concrete tower with offset halves, deeply recessed windows and, in agreement with the Japanese love for surfaces that express the nature of material, sharp-edged reinforced concrete as the dominant finish, inside and out. The building and its plaza were conceived as a continuous whole; the plaza is well below street level, and is contained by planters and reflecting pools. The building's walls taper in thickness from ten feet at the base to one foot at the top, and the entire structure suggests a forest; Erickson said that he was inspired by the paintings of artist Emily Carr, but added that the resemblance to a forest is incidental. The interior features innovative indirect lighting, coffered ceilings and, for the MacBlo offices, a unique built-in cupboard system that doubles as hallway partitions. The building is considered culturally significant as a breakthrough for Modernist designers and a masterful integration of structure and mechanics. In 1993, it was declared a National Heritage Building. In 2019, it achieved LEED Platinum certification. In 2021 it was renamed Arthur Erickson Place.

=== Museum of Anthropology at the University of British Columbia (Vancouver, BC) ===
The Museum of Anthropology was built in 1976, as an inclusion to the campus at the University of British Columbia. It houses artifacts and exhibits from world cultures, with an emphasis on Pacific Northwest cultures and the First Nations of British Columbia. This building blends methods of reinforced concrete and the traditional post-and-beam construction; oversized beams evoke a monumental feeling in many of Erickson's projects, calling on the size and scale of the surrounding trees. It includes Erickson's trademark use of concrete piers and large stretches of glass; by using concrete beams to represent de-materialized logs and opening up the main atrium through expanses of glass, Erickson refers to the traditional notion of post-and-beam construction while integrating these characteristics into a modernist building. The structure sits on a promontory facing the ocean and mountains. The landscape of the site was particularly important, as Erickson wanted to depict the connection between indigenous Pacific Northwest cultures to the land. He and Vancouver landscape architect Cornelia Oberlander studied the landscapes of Haida Gwaii, with its totem poles standing on mounds covered with wild grasses and surrounded by forest. A seed expert provided the correct plantings of indigenous grasses and flowers, fallen logs were left in situ, a gravel pond was created to reflect the mountains and sky, and mounds of earth were used to both muffle traffic noise and create the sense of hills rolling to the ocean. The university describes the museum as: ..."a total work of art, expressing a convergence of the site, building, collection and the performances and ceremonies that take place there."

=== Roy Thomson Hall (Toronto, ON) ===
Roy Thomson Hall was built between 1972 and 1982, and was designed by Erickson with the assistance of the Toronto firm of Mathers and Haldenby. Named after the Canadian media mogul Baron Thomson of Fleet (1894-1976), the building was devised as a permanent venue for the Toronto Symphony Orchestra and the Toronto Mendelssohn Choir. It is a 30,000 square-foot irregular oval structure with an 80-foot auditorium, rising above a four-storey square with partially-exposed service areas and rehearsal halls. The structure is covered by a multi-paned glass roof with triangular and diamond patterns divided by glazing bars and supported by a steel-tube skeleton. The glass cladding provides views into the building, where concrete columns support a series of interlocking lobbies. The mirrored foyer conceals noise-cancelling double walls; the interior also featured textured concrete walls, stainless steel trim and U-shaped seating topped by a giant oculus. Erickson had 32 different models constructed, and worked with an experienced acoustician, to establish the hall's correct shape and acoustics. He used globe fixtures to control the lighting, ventilation and sound systems, and suspended and moveable plastic disks and fabric-clad cylindrical banners to adjust the acoustics. In 2000, a $20 million acoustic enhancement project replaced all of this with a moveable central acoustical canopy. The walls were brought in by as much as 20 feet, the seating was rearranged, and wooden panels were added. Erickson, who was not consulted on the project, strongly and publicly objected to the overhaul, writing that acoustics were an "intangible pseudo-science". But the refurbished hall opened to high praise and it is now one of the chief landmarks in downtown Toronto. In 2001, it received Heritage Status from the City of Toronto.

=== Robson Square (Vancouver, BC) ===
Robson Square was built between 1978 and 1983 and is a three-block civic centre in the heart of Vancouver's downtown core. It was conceptualized as an urban oasis and Erickson's design includes waterfalls, plazas, a 25-foot grass mound, and stairs with integrated ramps, or "stramps". Paved in concrete and pink granite, it is one of the few complexes to fully integrate public space and landscape, as it includes the Vancouver Art Gallery, a skating rink and the Law Courts. Erickson worked with Cornelia Oberlander, and his former student Bing Thom, to create one of the earliest examples of green-roof technology—as the Law Courts administrative offices are all below the plaza, it is actually a roof garden, with waterfalls cascading past office windows and skylights to drown out street noise. Barriers have since been installed to keep people away from the waterfall and planters; it has also lost the cinema and auditorium, and the outdoor restaurants have been replaced by perimeter food trucks. But it now contains a UBC satellite campus and it is now a pedestrian-only zone, which was Erickson's original intent.

=== Canadian Chancery (Washington, DC) ===
The personal selection of Arthur Erickson as the architect for the Canadian Chancery in Washington, DC by then-Prime Minister Pierre Trudeau was controversial, because Trudeau and Erickson were close friends and the Prime Minister overruled the objections and choices of the embassy's design committee. Erickson's biographer Nicholas Olsberg described the building as "making fun of the ridiculous terms to which buildings must adhere in Washington... mocking the US and all of its imperial pretensions." In fact, Erickson had to obey his client's instructions, which were to express neighbourliness, openness and friendship, while adhering to the restrictions put in place by the 20 committees which regulate what happens on Pennsylvania Avenue. He blended the Neoclassicism of existing structures with the idiom of the Plantation house to create an expanse of space. Oberlander landscaped the courtyard with northern plants; Erickson had Haida artist Bill Reid create the massive sculpture Spirit of Haida Gwaii, the Black Canoe, which sits in the courtyard in a pool of water. While his detractors may have had initial doubts about his ability to create a structure which represented Canada, it is this building which won Erickson the AIA Gold Medal.

=== Museum of Glass (Tacoma, WA) ===
The Museum of Glass was built in the city of Tacoma, Washington, as part of an initiative to revitalize the waterfront which was one of the most polluted industrial areas in Washington in the past. Erickson's design for the museum features a 90-foot-tall metal cone erupting from a structure of steel and concrete. The enormous cone acts as a 'chimney' for the museum's amphitheater, where visitors can overlook visiting artists as they create glass art. Large public art displays and concrete plazas overlook the neighbouring waterway, while pools of water interlaced with stairs and switchback ramps to connect each levels. The museum aims to connect the downtown core to the city's waterfront as well, through a 150-foot long bridge named the Chihuly Bridge of Glass. The bridge is named after Tacoma native Dale Chihuly, who was a pioneer of the Studio Glass Movement and has many works on display at the museum.

== Style, method and philosophy ==
Erickson's early buildings were modernist concrete or wooden structures designed to respond to the natural conditions of their locations, especially climate. He always integrated light and water features into his designs, along with the characteristic horizontal elements and terraces that came from the vernacular architecture of the Far East. Many buildings, such as the Museum of Anthropology, were inspired by the post and beam architecture of the Coastal First Nations, Asian temples and the North American log cabin. Erickson is also known for numerous futuristic designs such as the Fresno City Hall, the UCI School of Biological Sciences, and the 1967 Catton House, also known as the 'Starship House'.

Erickson constantly stressed the importance of greenery and water in all of his designs; as a teacher, he made students draw blades of grass. He brought in a landscape architect at the outset of all of his projects; in most cases, that was Cornelia Oberlander. In the 1980s Erickson designed several modernist homes; Eppich House II, for the industrialist Hugo Eppich, is considered Erickson's best modernist home design.

Erickson was a gifted public speaker and, each year, he selected speaking engagements which would allow him, he said, to share his opinions with "the very ones who should be told". When accepting an award from the Royal Bank of Canada, he scolded the assembled businessmen for the “ruthless economic competition” in North American cities, which expresses itself in "wastelands of parked cars...grim, sunless spaces between towering edifices" and he defined the bulldozer as the "symbol of North America". He asked for a shift toward a "balance between economic profit and social well-being" and asked "Should not the land come under public ownership so that the ultimate control is in the public’s hands?" At the 1974 International Congress of Architecture in Iran, he pleaded with Third World countries to preserve their own cultures, to avoid the Western solution of freeways and high rises and "all the trashy neon and plastic glitter", adding that what the West has "thrown on the waters of the world drifts back to us on a tide of cultural pollution appalling to behold". He viewed tourism as an industry that has "gone wild", comparing tourists to plagues of locusts that "arrive, destroy, and leave conscienceless from the havoc they have wreaked".

In a 1979 interview with The New Yorker, Erickson said: "Where I am or what I am is no concern of mine. I am concerned with what our civilization is all about, and expressing this in buildings. Everything I do, everything I see is through architecture. It has given me a vehicle for looking at the world. I am not involved in the aesthetics of architecture or interested in design as such. I’m interested in what buildings can do beyond what they look like, and how they can affect whole areas and people’s lives. I have never done a building where I didn’t at least attempt to see it in a new philosophical or social way. I could have asked questions in any field, but I am doing it through my buildings. What panics me is how little time I have. Now I want to build with all details suppressed, to make what I build look as if it had just happened—as if there were nothing studied, no labor or art involved. Architecture is no different from any other art process. It is like poetry, in which you compress everything into a few words. To achieve that economy takes a lifetime."

== Works ==
(by year completed)
Complete Project List at Canadian Centre for Architecture, Arthur Erickson Fonds

- Killam-Massey House, West Vancouver BC (1955)
- McKeen Beach House, Qualicum Beach BC (1955)
- Filberg House, Comox BC (1959)
- University Centre, University of British Columbia (UBC), Vancouver (1959/1968), Erickson et al
- Boultbee House, Vancouver (1960)
- Dyde House, Edmonton AB (1960)
- Graham House, West Vancouver (1962)
- Perry House, North Vancouver, BC (1963)
- Point Grey Town Homes, Vancouver (1963)
- Arthur Erickson Place, Vancouver (1965)
- Metal House, Vancouver (1965) w Nick Milkovich
- Canadian Pavilion, International Trade Fair, Tokyo (1965)
- Baldwin House, Burnaby, BC (1965)
- Smith House, West Vancouver (1965)
- Simon Fraser University, Burnaby (1965 onward, in stages)
- Mitchell Wedge House, North Vancouver (1966)
- Fuldauer House, West Vancouver (1966)
- Man in the Community Pavilion, Expo 67, Montreal, QC (1967)
- Canadian Pavilion, Expo 67, Montreal (1967), consulting architect
- Craig House, Kelowna, BC (1967)
- Catton House, West Vancouver (1968), Erickson et al
- Hi-View Estates Port Moody BC (1968)
- Lam House, Cotuit, Massachusetts, 1969
- Manoah Village, Richmond, BC, (1969)
- Government of Canada Pavilion, Expo '70, Osaka (1970)
- Ross Street Sikh Temple, Vancouver (1970)
- Shannon Mews, Vancouver (1971)
- University Hall, University of Lethbridge, Lethbridge AB (1971)
- Helmut Eppich House, West Vancouver (1972)
- Champlain Heights Elementary School, Vancouver (1973)
- Hilborn House, Cambridge, ON (1974)
- Museum of Anthropology at UBC, Vancouver (1976)
- Habitat Pavilion, Habitat I, Vancouver (1976)
- Lincoln Centre House, Fire Island, NY (1977)
- Bagley Wright House, Seattle, WA (1977)
- Hollenberg House, Bad Homburg, Germany (1978)
- Keevil Beach House, Savary Island, BC (1978)
- Eglinton West Subway Station, Toronto, ON (1978), w Clifford & Lawrie
- Yorkdale Subway Station, Toronto, ON (1978)
- Evergreen Building, Vancouver (1978)
- Robson Square, Provincial Law Courts, and Vancouver Art Gallery, Vancouver (1978–1983)
- Montiverdi Estates, West Vancouver (1979)
- Bank of Canada Building Addition, Ottawa, ON (1979), w Marani Rounthwaite & Dick
- Hwang House, Vancouver (1982)
- Roy Thomson Hall, Toronto (1982)
- Georgian Court Hotel, Vancouver (1983)
- Hugo Eppich House, West Vancouver (1983/2014)
- Air Defence Ministry Building, Jeddah KSA (1984), with Bing Thom
- Napp Research Centre, Cambridge, UK (1983)
- Robert McLaughlin Gallery expansion, Oshawa, ON (1984)
- One California Plaza & Master Plan, Bunker Hill, Los Angeles, CA (1985)
- Gilbert Biological Sciences Building, Stanford University, Standford CA (1985)
- King's Landing, Toronto (1985), with Cowle and Martin
- Suki's Salon, Vancouver (1986) w Nick Milkovich
- Red Deer Polytechnic Arts Centre, Red Deer, AB (1986)
- Vinod Khosla House, Portola Valley CA (1986)
- Etisalat Tower I, Dubai (1986)
- Russell House, Tacoma, WA (1986)
- Admiralty Place Housing, Dartmouth, NS (1987), with Cowle and Martin
- Stein Institute for Research on Aging, University of California, San Diego (1987)
- Dalhousie University Law Library addition, Halifax, NS (1988)
- Halperin House, Los Angeles, 1988
- Balboa Beach House, Newport Beach, CA (1988)
- Government of Ontario Building, Thunder Bay ON (1989), with Reginald Nalezyty Architect
- Canadian Chancery, Washington, DC (1989)
- Markham Civic Centre, Markham, ON (1989), with Richard Stevens Architects
- San Diego Convention Center, San Diego, CA (1989)
- The Kingbridge Centre, King City, ON (1989)
- Inn at Laurel Point, Addition, Victoria, BC (1989)
- Saskatoon City Hospital, Saskatoon, SK (1990)
- Kaiser Permanente Baldwin Park Medical Center, Baldwin Park CA (1991), w HMC Architects
- Fresno City Hall, Fresno, CA (1991)
- McGaugh Hall, University of California, Irvine (1991)
- Two California Plaza & Master Plan at Bunker Hill, Los Angeles, CA (1992)
- Walter C. Koerner Library, UBC Vancouver (1997)
- Bruce Dunbar Maui House, Makena, HI (1998)
- Portland Hotel, Vancouver (2000)
- Liu Institute for Global Issues, Vancouver (2000)
- Scotiabank Dance Centre, Vancouver (2001), w Noel Best
- Waterfall Building, Vancouver (2001) Erickson et al
- Choklit Townhomes, Vancouver (2004), w Nick Milkovich
- Oil Sector Complex, Kuwait City (2005)
- Weihai Culture & Arts Center, Weihai, China (2005), with Nick Milkovich Architects
- RCMP Heritage Centre, Regina, SK (2007)
- Museum of Glass, Tacoma, WA (2002)
- Canada House, Vancouver, BC (2009)
- The Erickson, Vancouver, BC (2010)
- McLelland Hall, University of Arizona at Tucson (2015), designed 1988 w NBBJ-Gresham Larson, completed by Gould Evans
- Paradox Hotel Vancouver (2016), designed 2005; completed by Musson Cattell Mackey

== Awards ==
- Massey Medal: Killam-Massey House, 1958
- Centennial Design Award, National Housing Design Council, 1967
- Molson Prize, Canada Council for the Arts, 1967
- Massey Medal: Smith House, 1967
- Massey Medal: Simon Fraser University, 1967
- Massey Medal: Canadian Pavilion Tokyo, 1967
- Award of Merit, Canadian Architect Magazine, 1968
- Award, Architectural Record Magazine: Lam House, 1969
- Massey Medal: MacMillan Bloedel Building, 1970
- Massey Medal: Canadian Pavilion Osaka, 1970
- Triangle Award, National Society of Interior Designers: Canadian Pavilion Osaka, 1970
- Architectural Institute of Japan: Best Pavilion Expo '70, 1970
- Award of Excellence, Canadian Architect Magazine, 1970
- Cultural Centre Competition Award: Pompidou Centre, Paris, 1971
- Royal Bank of Canada Award: Contributions to Human Welfare, 1971
- Officer of the Order of Canada, 1973
- Gold Medal in Architecture & Allied Arts, Tau Sigma Delta Honor Society, 1973
- Auguste Perret Prize, International Union of Architects, 1974
- Auguste Perret Prize, International Union of Architects, 1975
- President's Award of Excellence, American Society of Landscape Architects: Robson Square, 1979
- Royal Architectural Institute of Canada Festival of Architecture Honour Awards (6): Robson Square & Provincial Law Courts, Eppich Residence, Museum of Anthropology, Habitat Pavilion, Ross Street Sikh Temple, Champlain Heights Community School, 1980
- Companion of the Order of Canada, 1981
- Governor General's Medal in Architecture: Yorkdale Rapid Transit Station, 1982
- Governor General's Medal in Architecture: Robson Square, 1982
- Governor General's Medal in Architecture: Museum of Anthropology, 1983
- Gold Medal for Outstanding Architect, Royal Architectural Institute of Canada, 1984
- AIA Chicago Award, Inaugural (with Philip Johnson), 1984
- Gold Medal, French Academy of Architecture, 1984
- Gold Medal, American Institute of Architects, 1986
- Honorary Fellow, Consejo Superior de los Colegios de Arquitectos de España, 1987
- Honorary Fellow, Royal Incorporation of Architects in Scotland, 1988
- Honorary Fellow, Colegio de Arquitectos de la Ciudad de México, 1993
- Honorary Fellow, Royal Institute of British Architects, 2001
- Architectural Institute of British Columbia Medal: Waterfall Building, 2002, (with Nick Milkovich Architects)
- Architectural Institute of British Columbia Medal: Museum of Glass, 2003, (with Nick Milkovich Architects)
- Design Arts Award, Vancouver Arts Awards, 2004
- Premier's Award of Excellence in Architecture: RCMP Heritage Centre, 2007
- Prix du XXe siecle, Royal Architectural Institute of Canada: Simon Fraser University, 2007
- Prix du XXe siecle, Royal Architectural Institute of Canada: Smith House, 2007
- Urban Development Institute Award: The Erickson, 2010 (with Nick Milkovich Architects)
- Prix du XXe siecle, Royal Architectural Institute of Canada: Museum of Anthropology, 2011
- Prix du XXe siecle, Royal Architectural Institute of Canada: Robson Square, 2011
- Best International Hotel Architecture, International Property Awards: Trump International Hotel and Tower, 2017

== Honorary degrees ==
- D.Eng., Technical University of Nova Scotia, 1973
- LL.D., Simon Fraser University, 1973
- LL.D., McGill University, 1975
- LL.D, University of Manitoba, 1978
- LL.D., University of Lethbridge, 1981
- D.Lit., University of British Columbia, 1985
- D.Lit., Lakehead University, 1988
- M.Arch., The School of Architecture at Taliesin, 2001

== Personal life and legacy ==
Erickson lived in Vancouver's Point Grey neighbourhood with his partner Francisco Kripacz (1942-2000), who acted as interior designer on several of Erickson's projects. After a long battle with Alzheimer's disease, he died in Vancouver on May 20, 2009.

Erickson was the mentor of many other noted local architects and urbanists, including founding members of many of Vancouver's premier design-oriented architectural firms.

His legacy lives on through the Arthur Erickson Foundation, founded originally in 1993 as the Arthur Erickson House and Garden Foundation, which was eventually able to purchase his home. The foundation has since expanded to offer education, research, and work in preservation with stewardship, education, and tours. Through the Vancouver Foundation, his family created The Arthur Erickson Fund for Excellence, whose purpose is to promote original and beautiful design that is culturally and environmentally sensitive.

Arthur Erickson divided the archives of his work among several Canadian repositories. The Canadian Architecture Collection of McGill University holds his Middle East projects from 1975–1997, as well as other architectural drawings and biographical and professional papers from pre-1950 to 1987. The Canadian Architectural Archives at the University of Calgary hold material that covers 1963–1970. The Canadian Centre for Architecture fonds document his work from 1947–2002.

In 2021, the City of Vancouver re-named the MacMillan Bloedel Building 'Arthur Erickson Place'.

He was the subject of Arthur Erickson: Beauty Between the Lines, a 2024 documentary film by Danny Berish and Ryan Mah.

In 2025, the School of Architecture and Landscape Architecture at UBC and the West Coast Modern League partnered to organized a year-long Centennial celebration of Erickson's works.

== See also ==
- Distinguished Canadian Planners

== Gallery ==
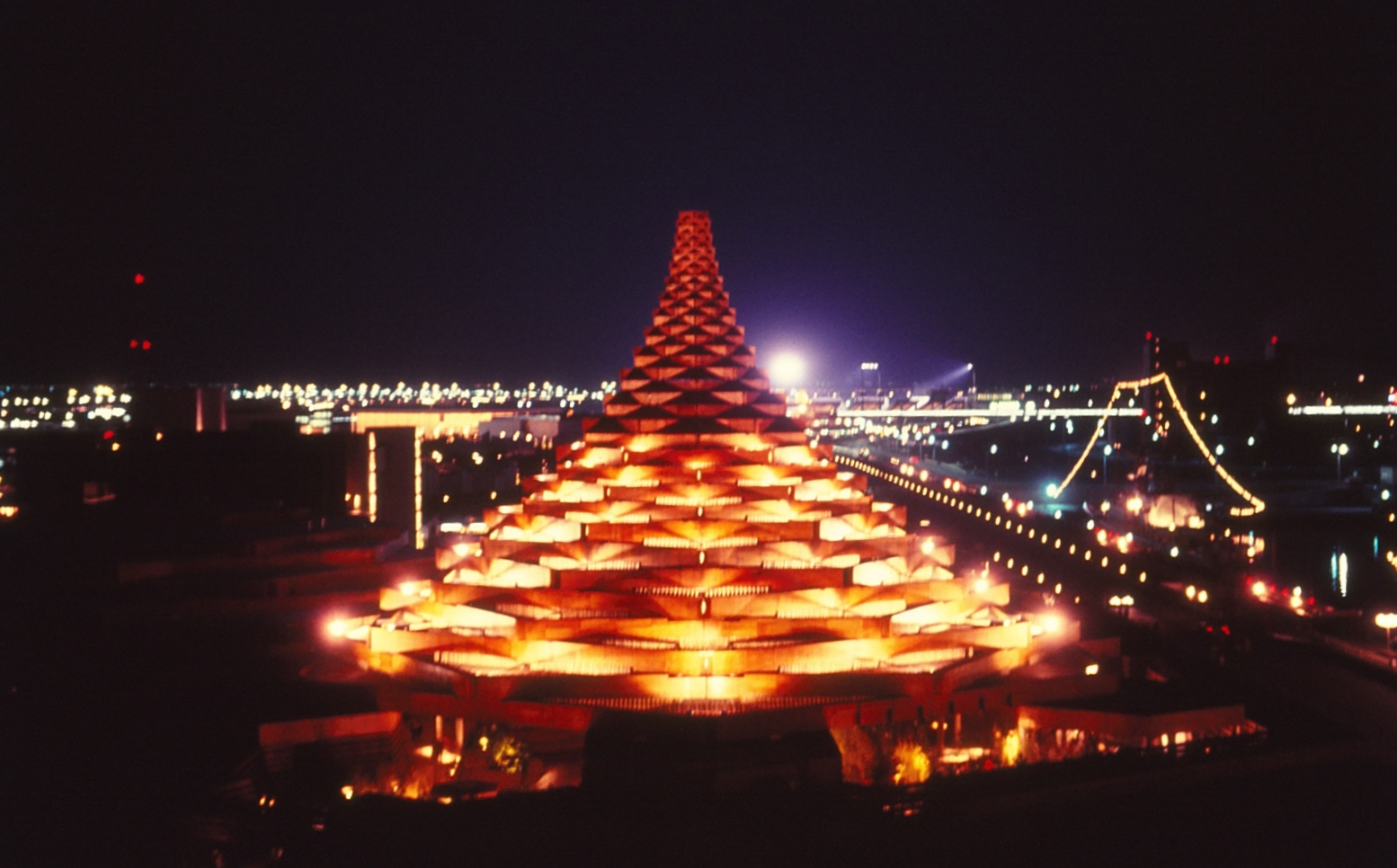
Man in the Community Pavilion, Montreal

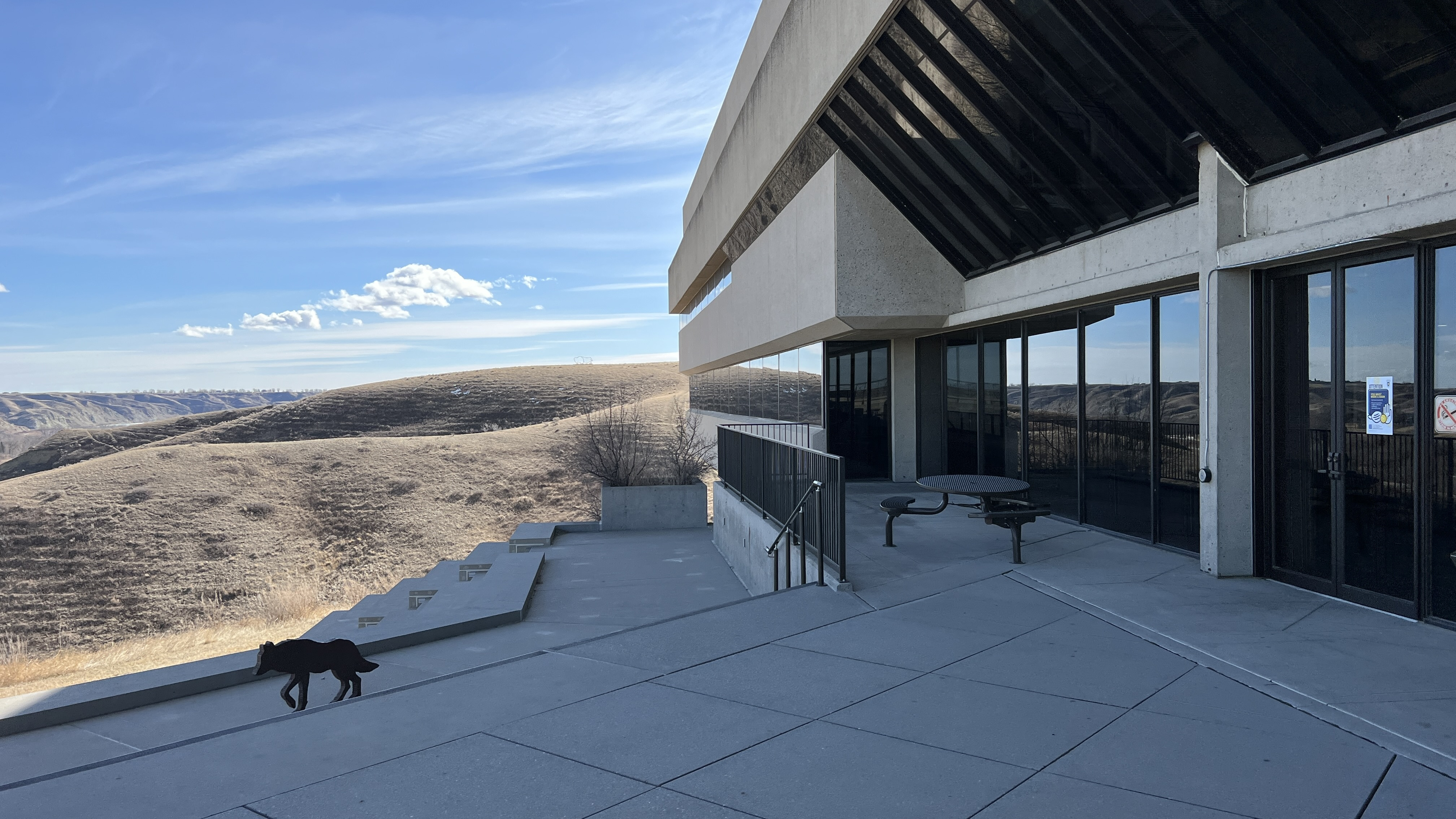
University Hall Lethbridge

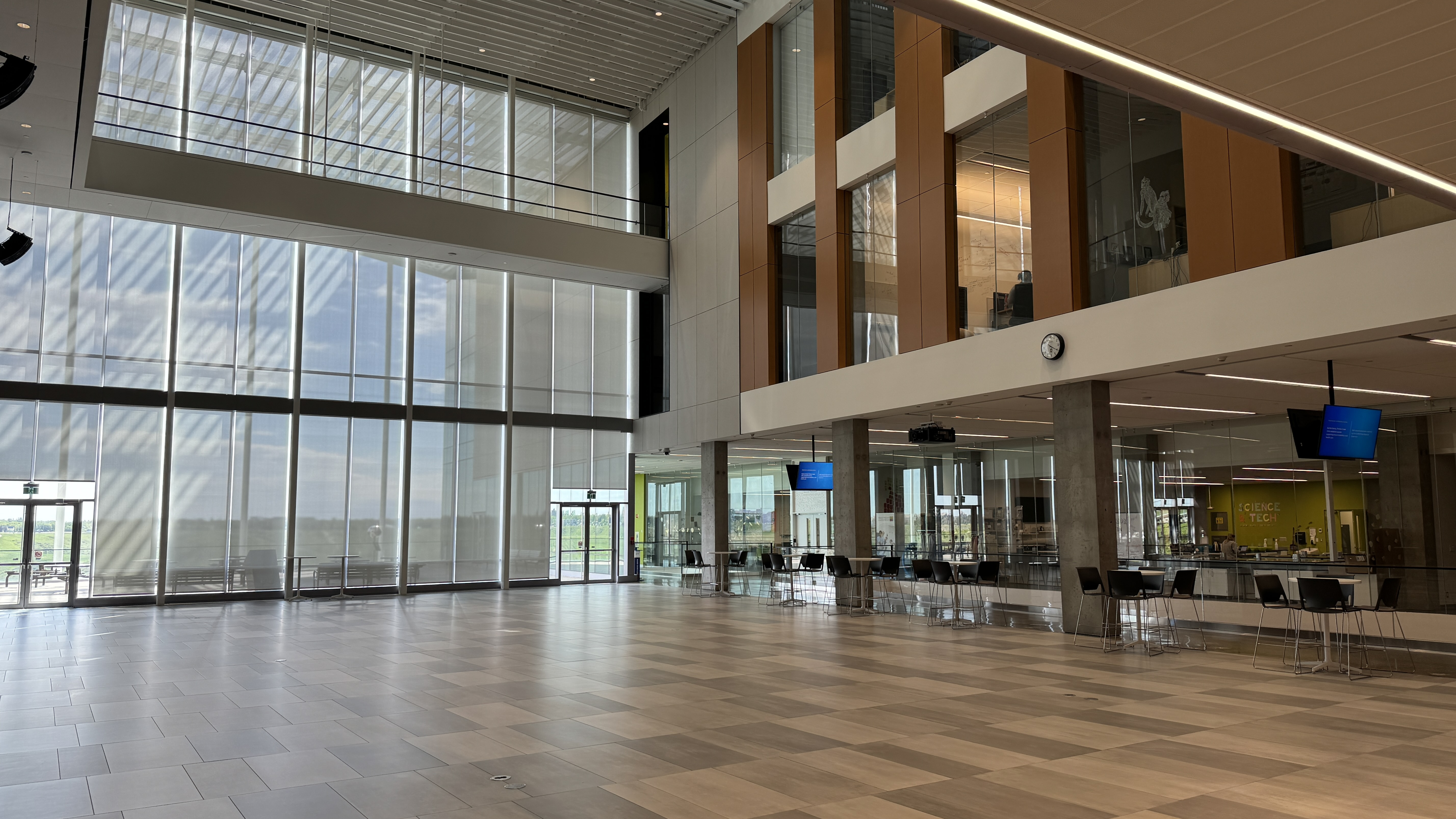
University of Lethbridge Interior

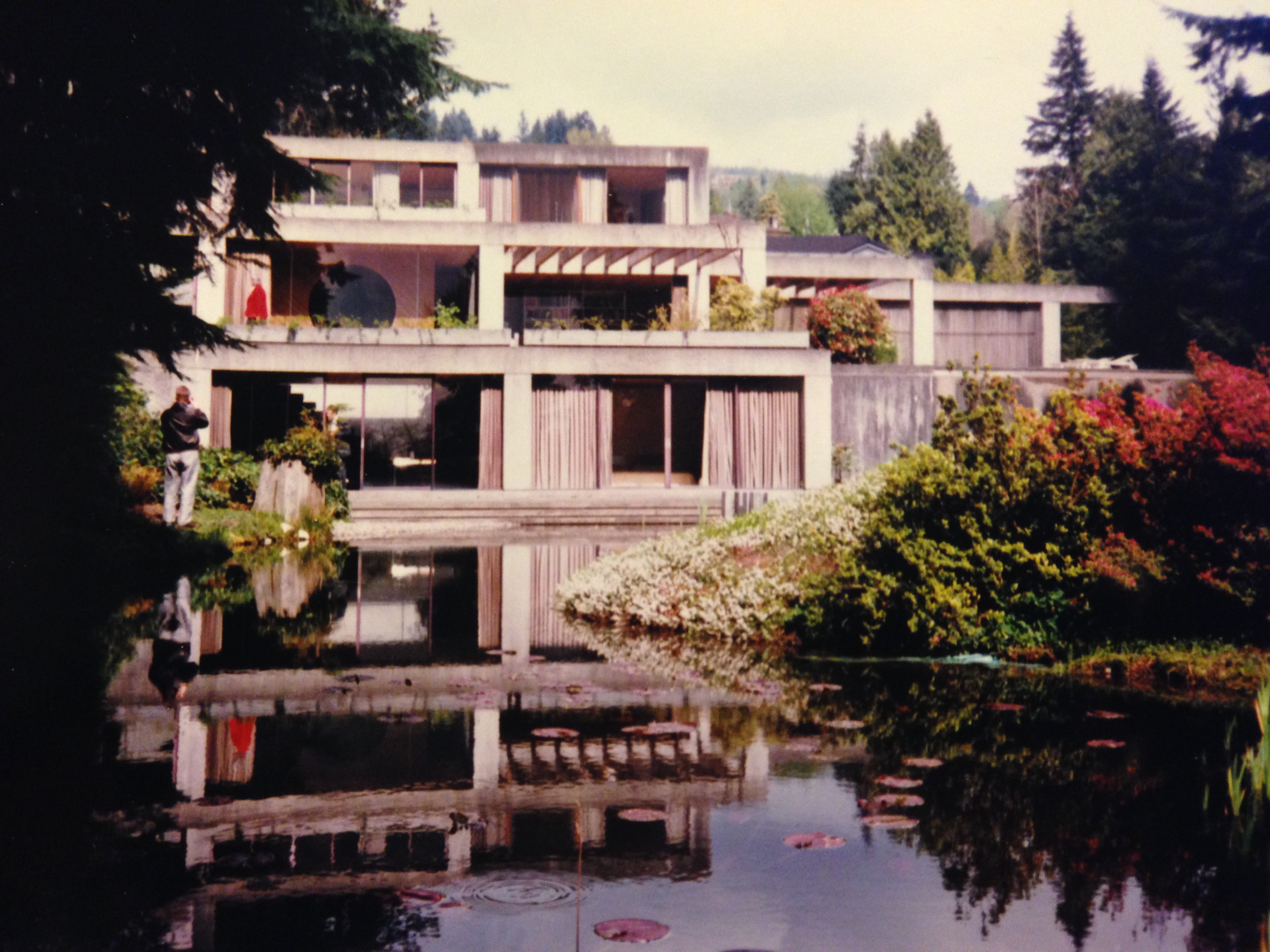
Helmut Eppich House, West Vancouver

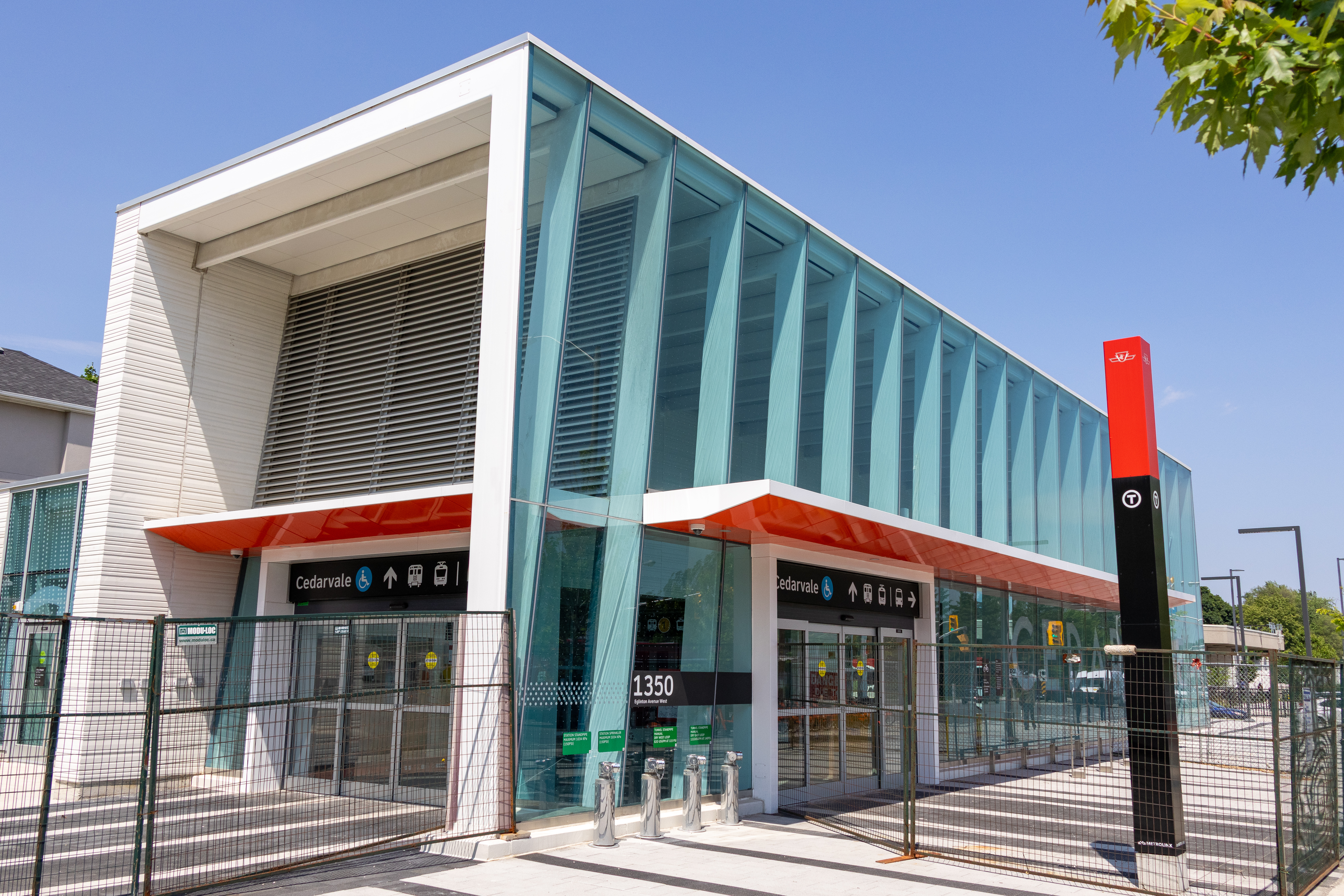
Cedarvale Subway Station, Toronto

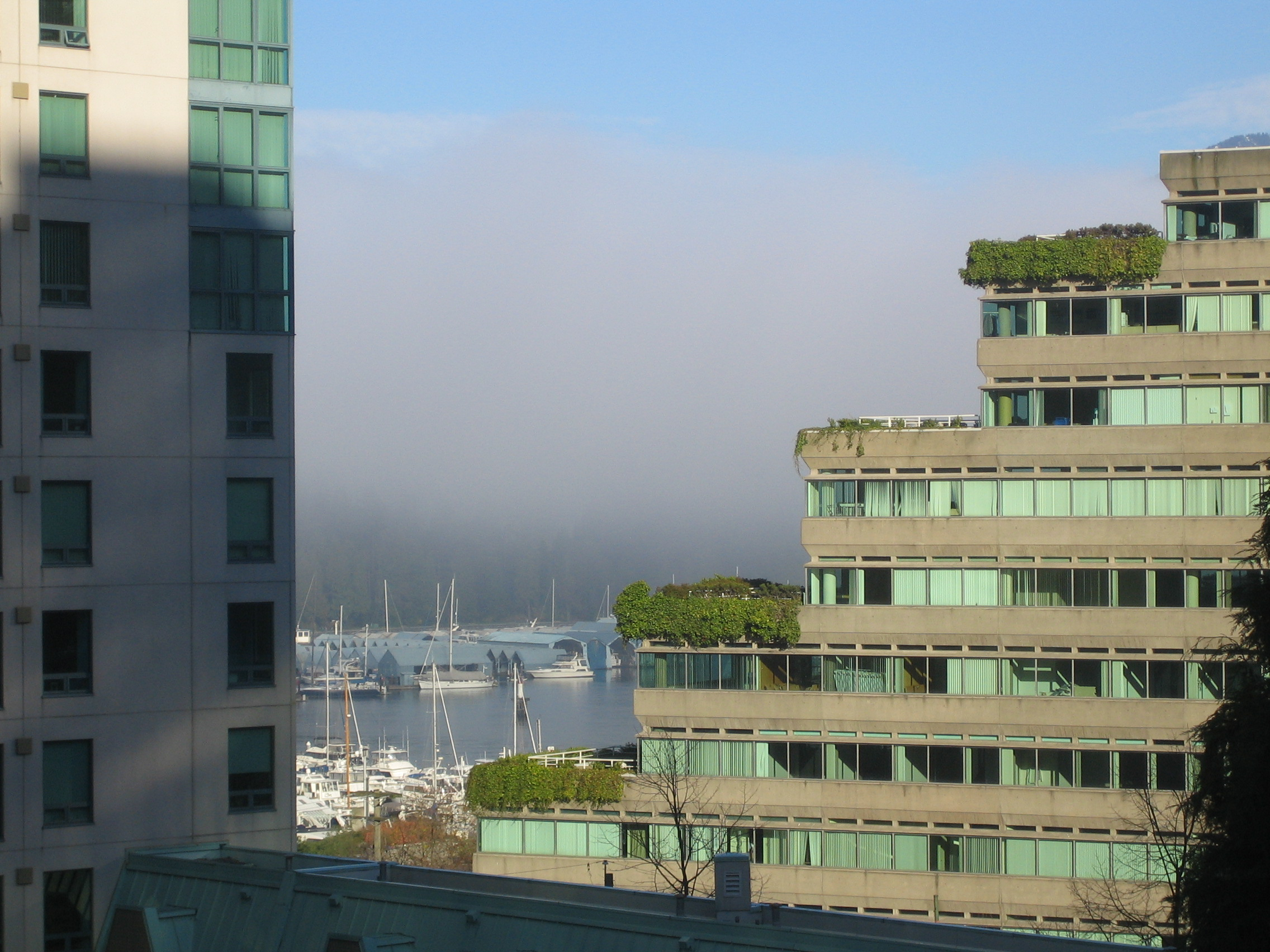
The Evergreen Building, Vancouver

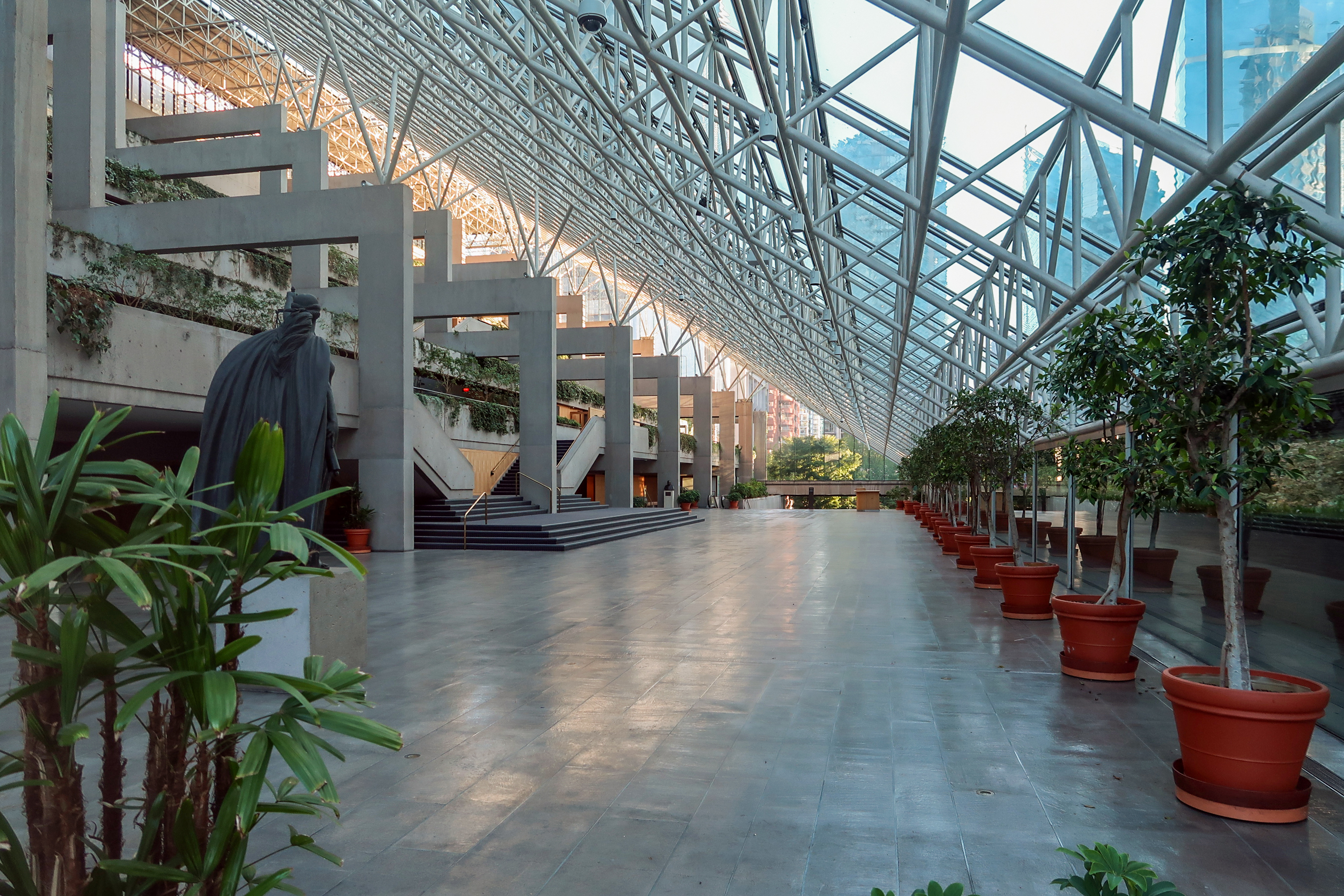
Vancouver Law Courts Interior Concourse

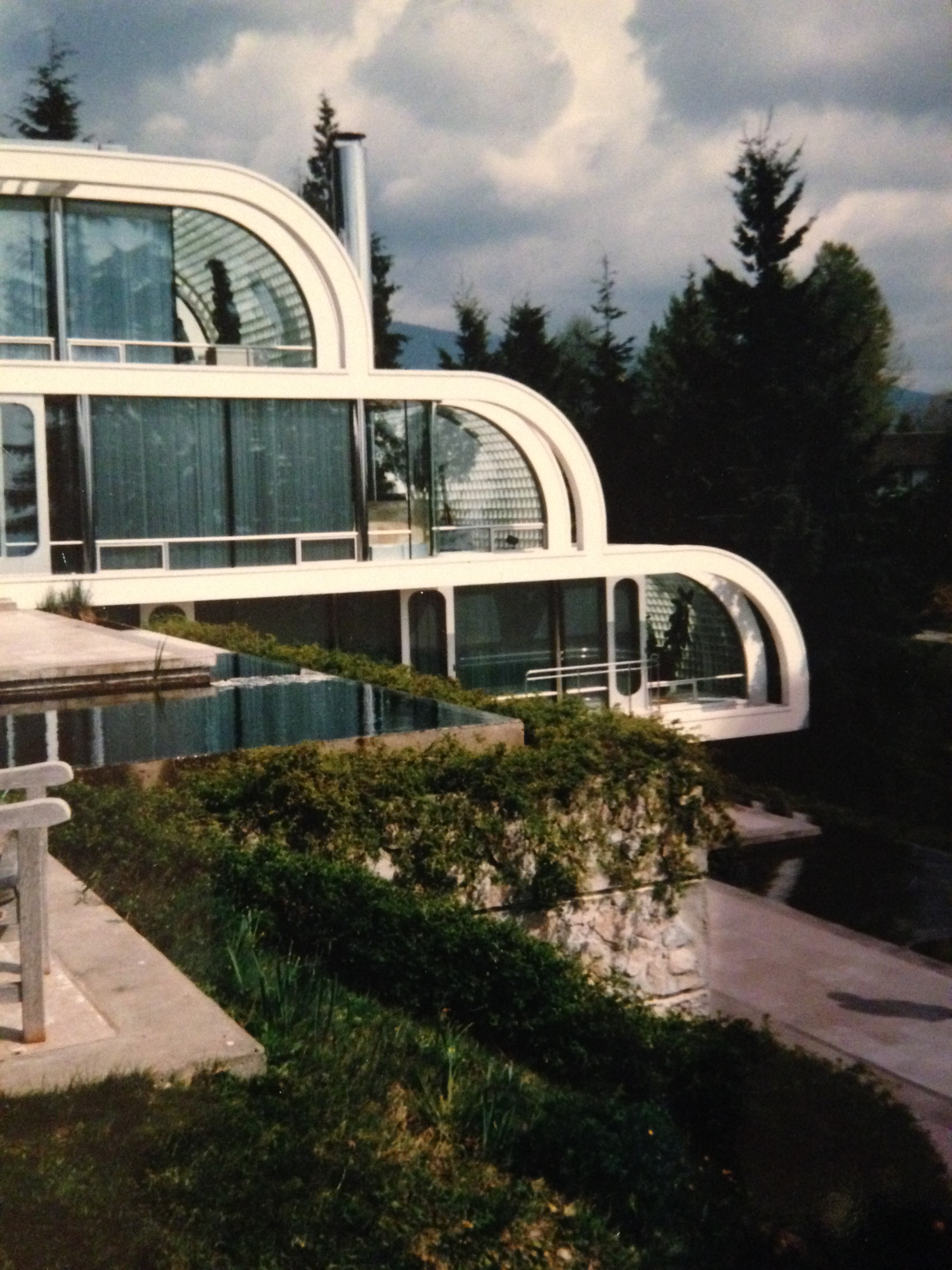
Hugo Eppich House, West Vancouver

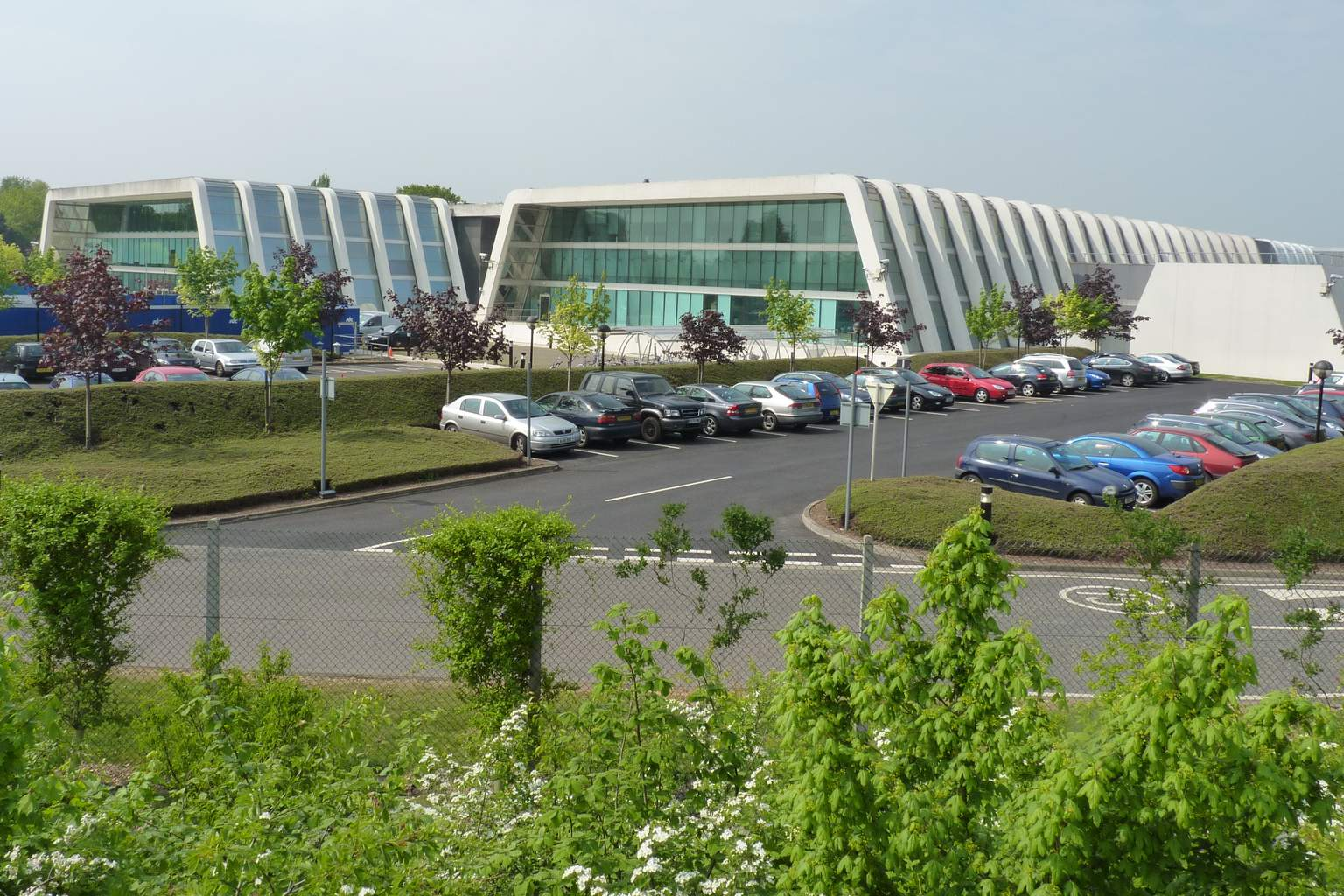
Napp Research Centre, Cambridge

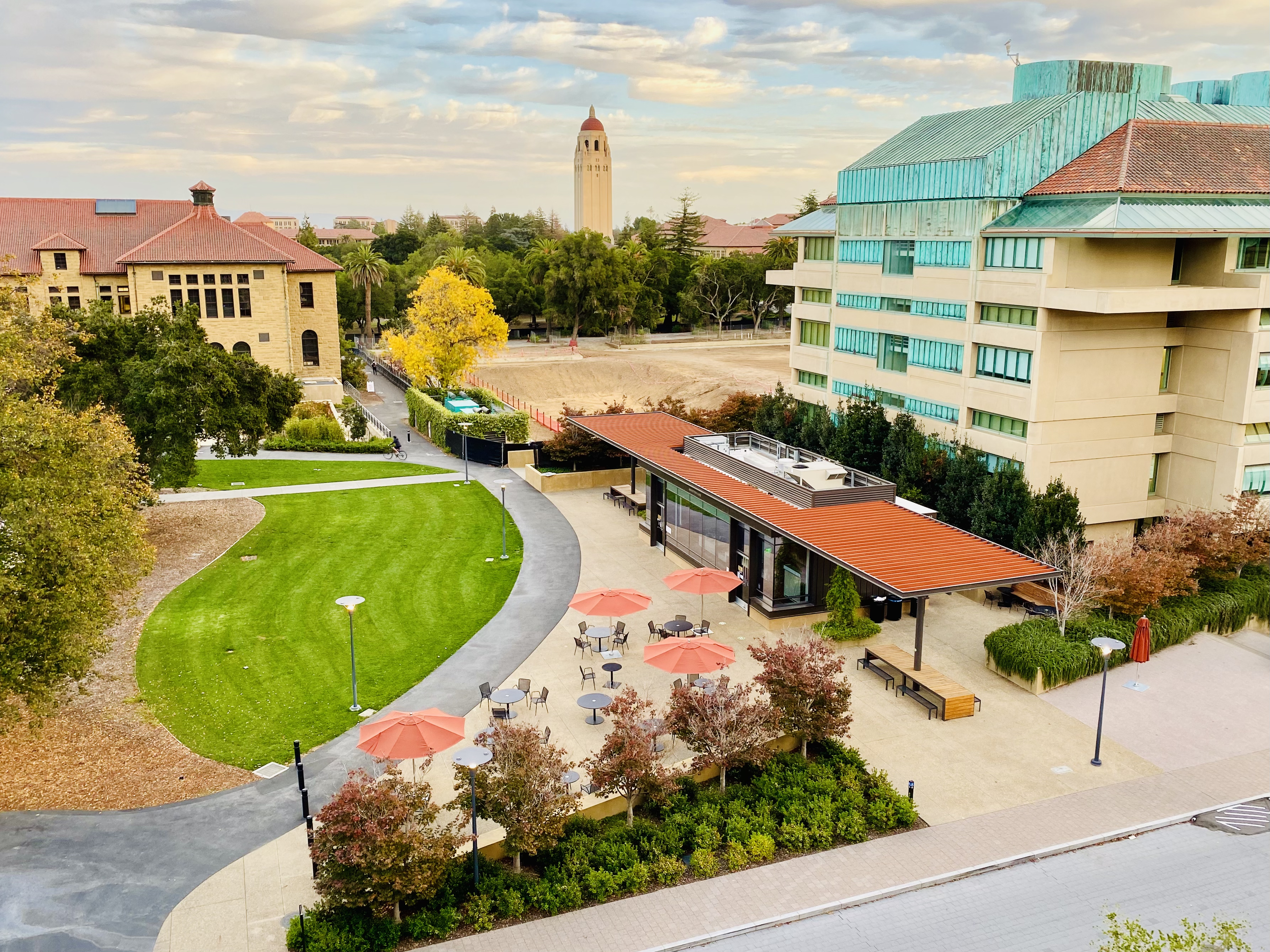
Gilbert Biological Sciences Building (R), Stanford

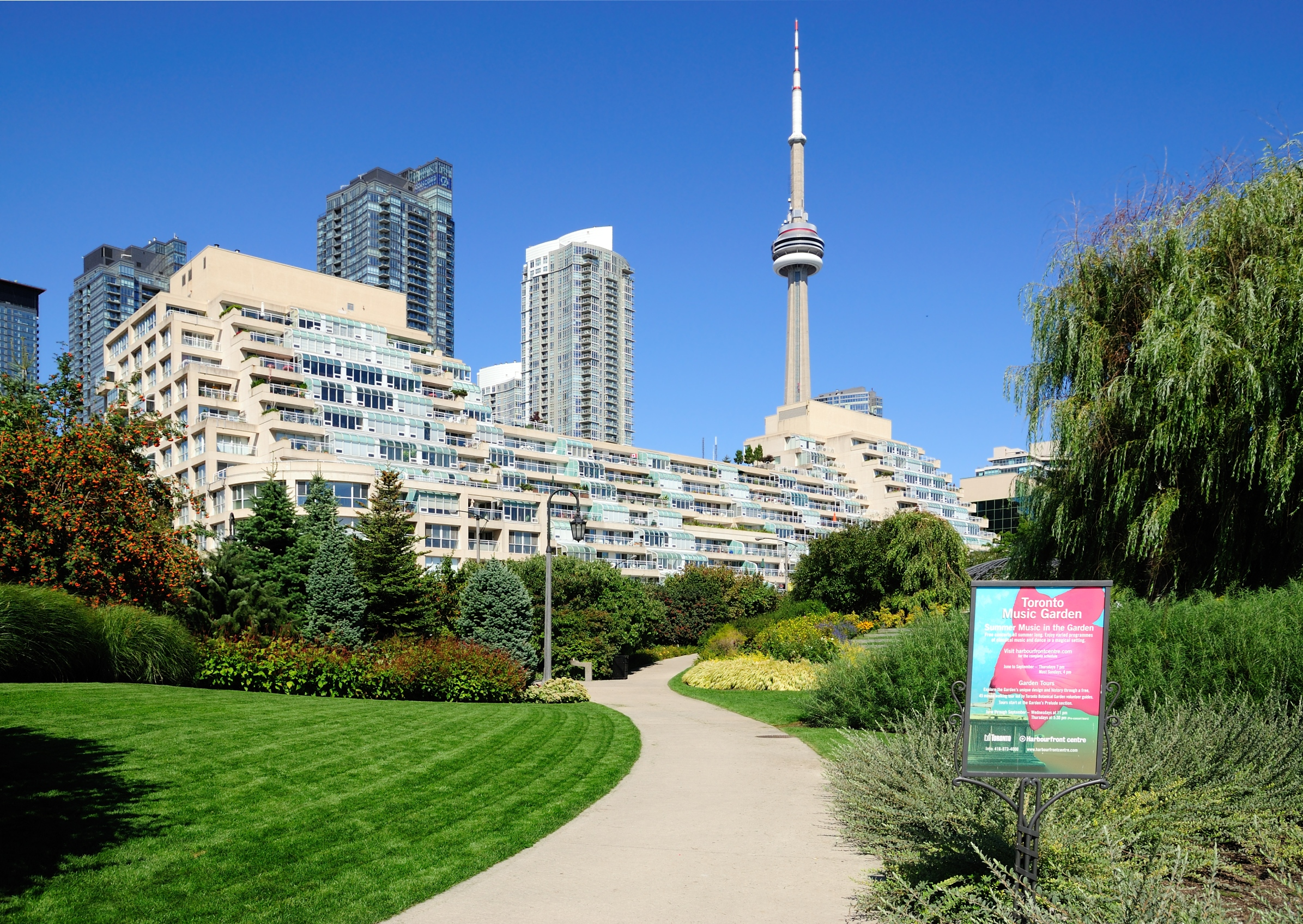
King's Landing, Toronto

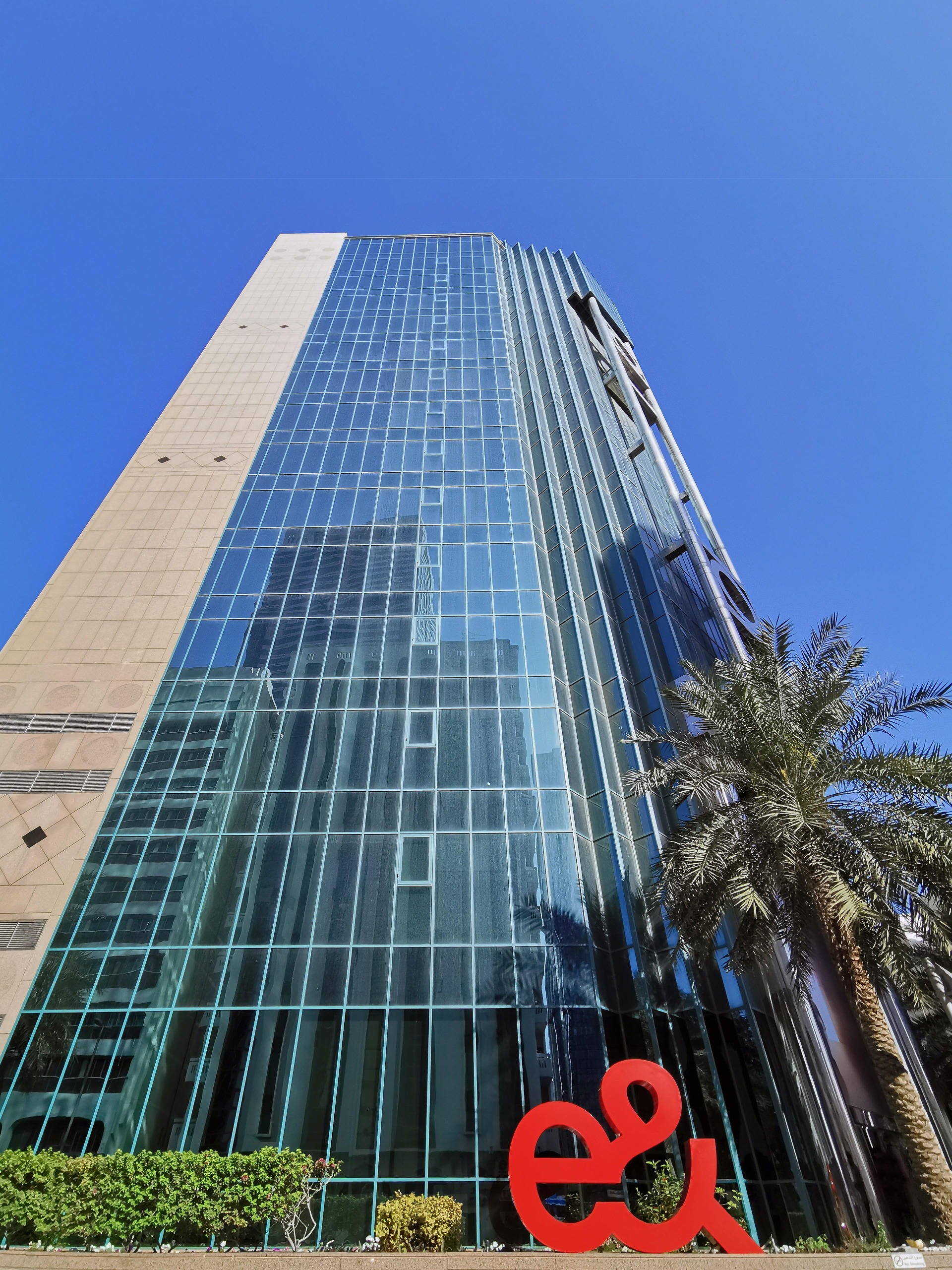
Etisalat Tower, Dubai

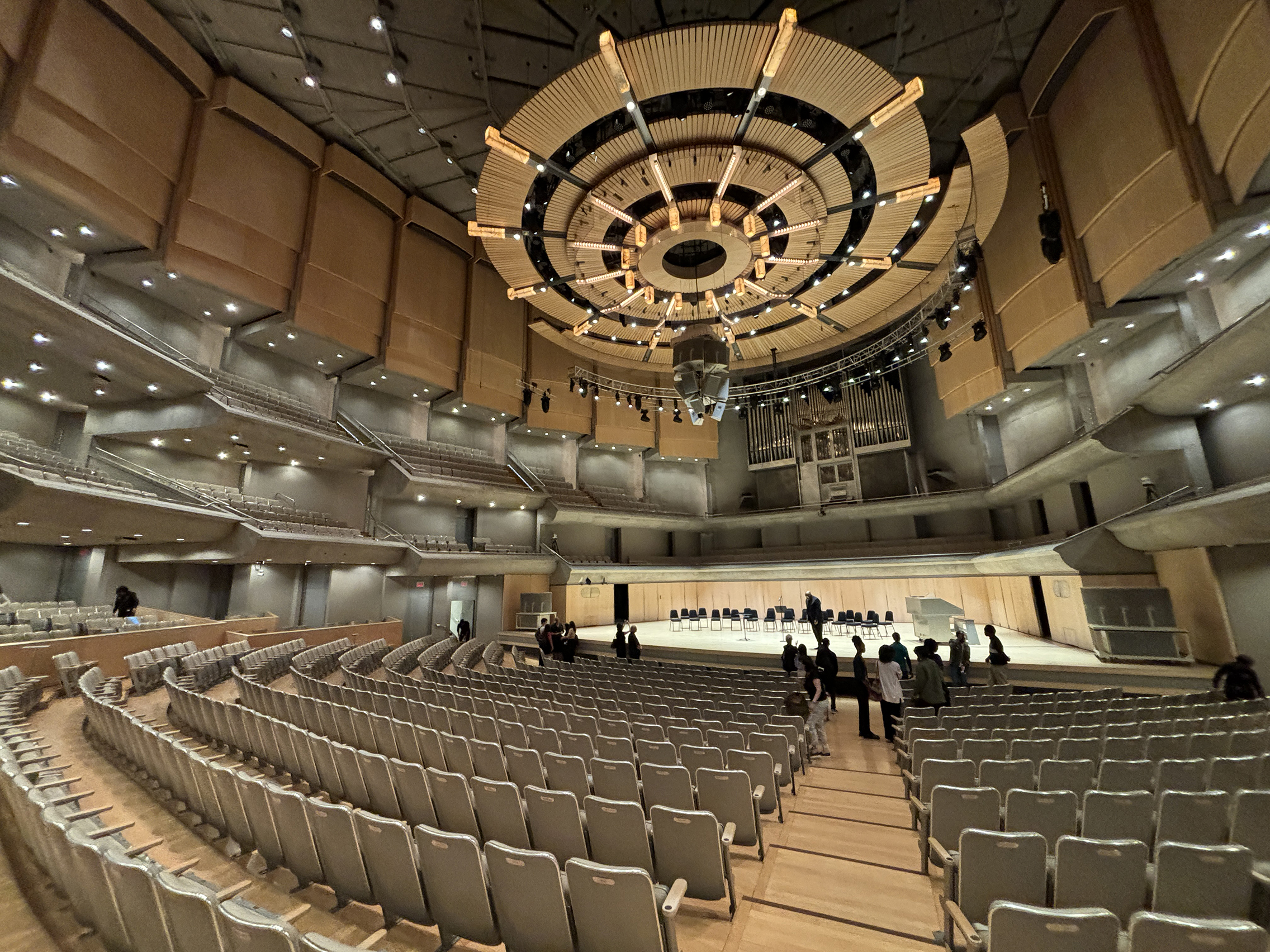
Roy Thomson Hall Interior

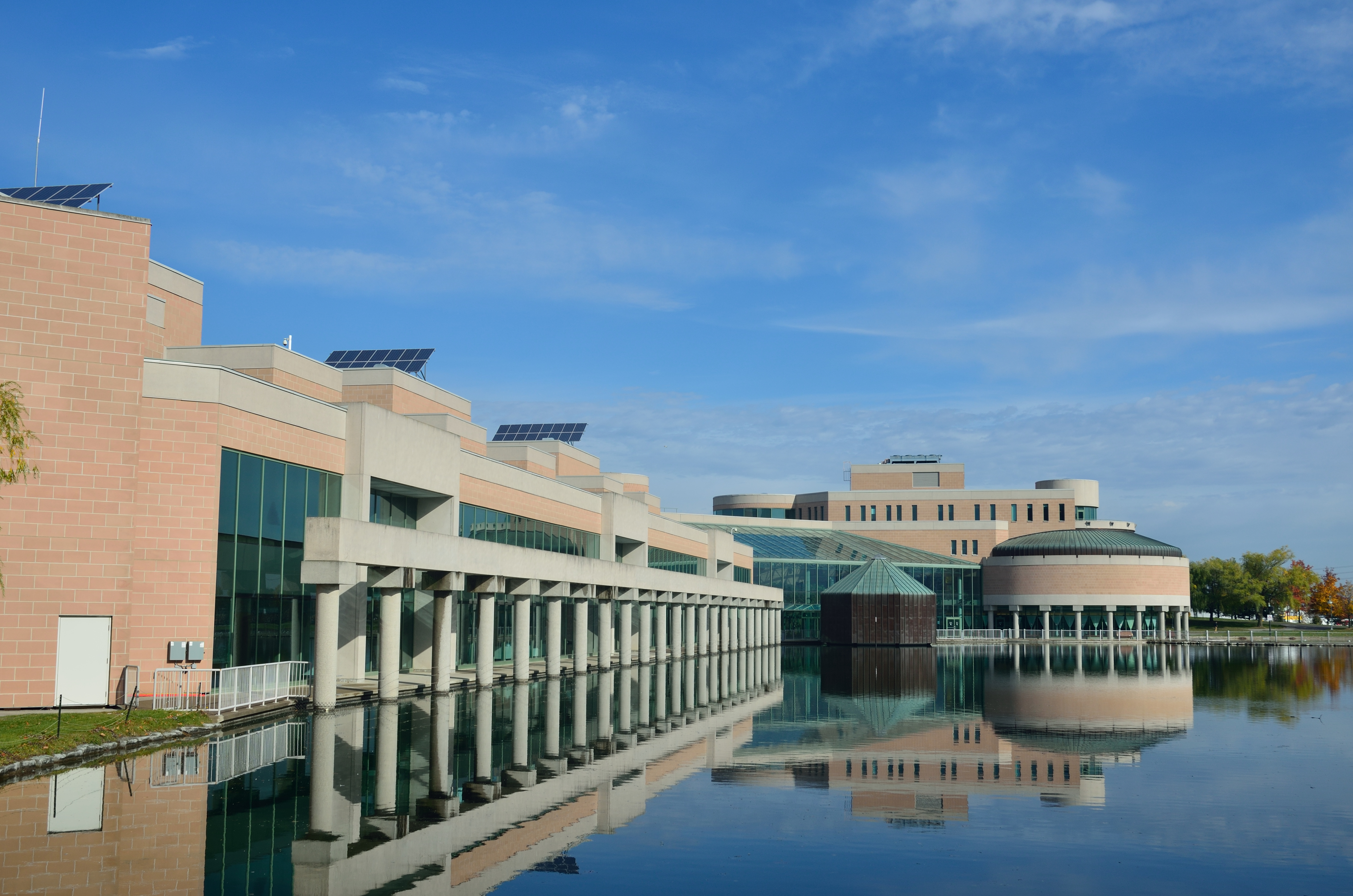
Markham Civic Centre, Markham ON

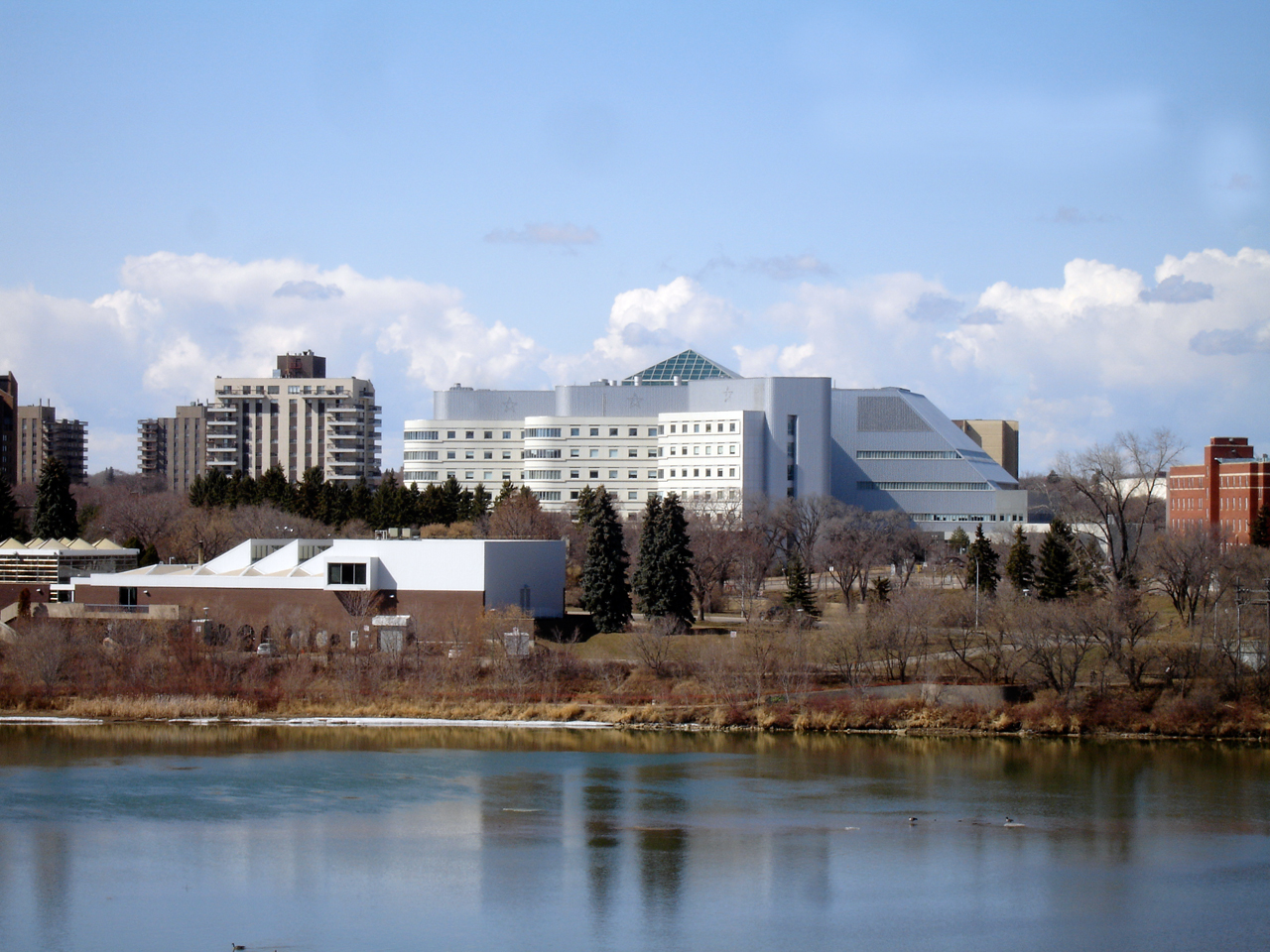
Saskatoon City Hospital

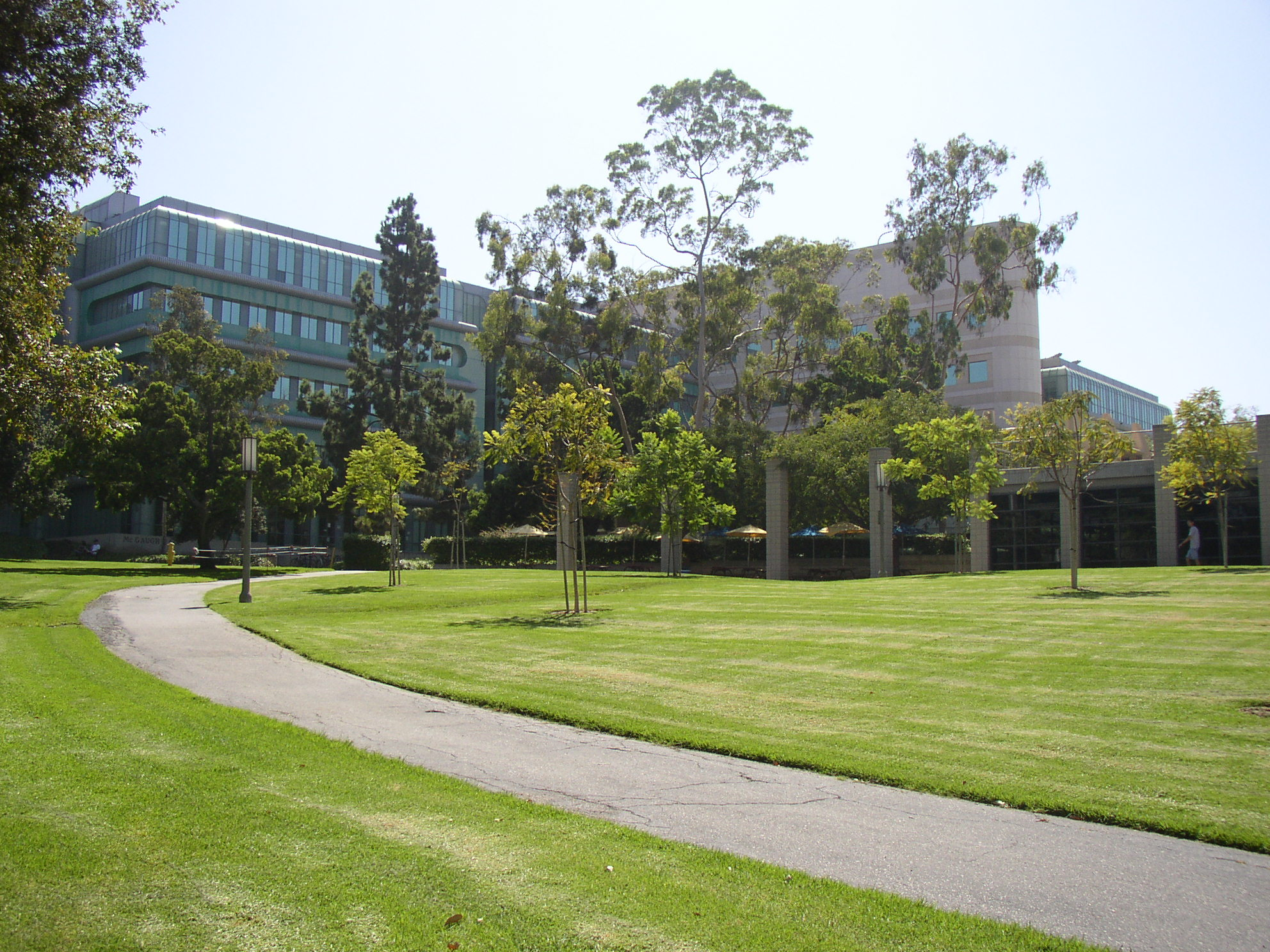
McGaugh Hall, Irvine CA

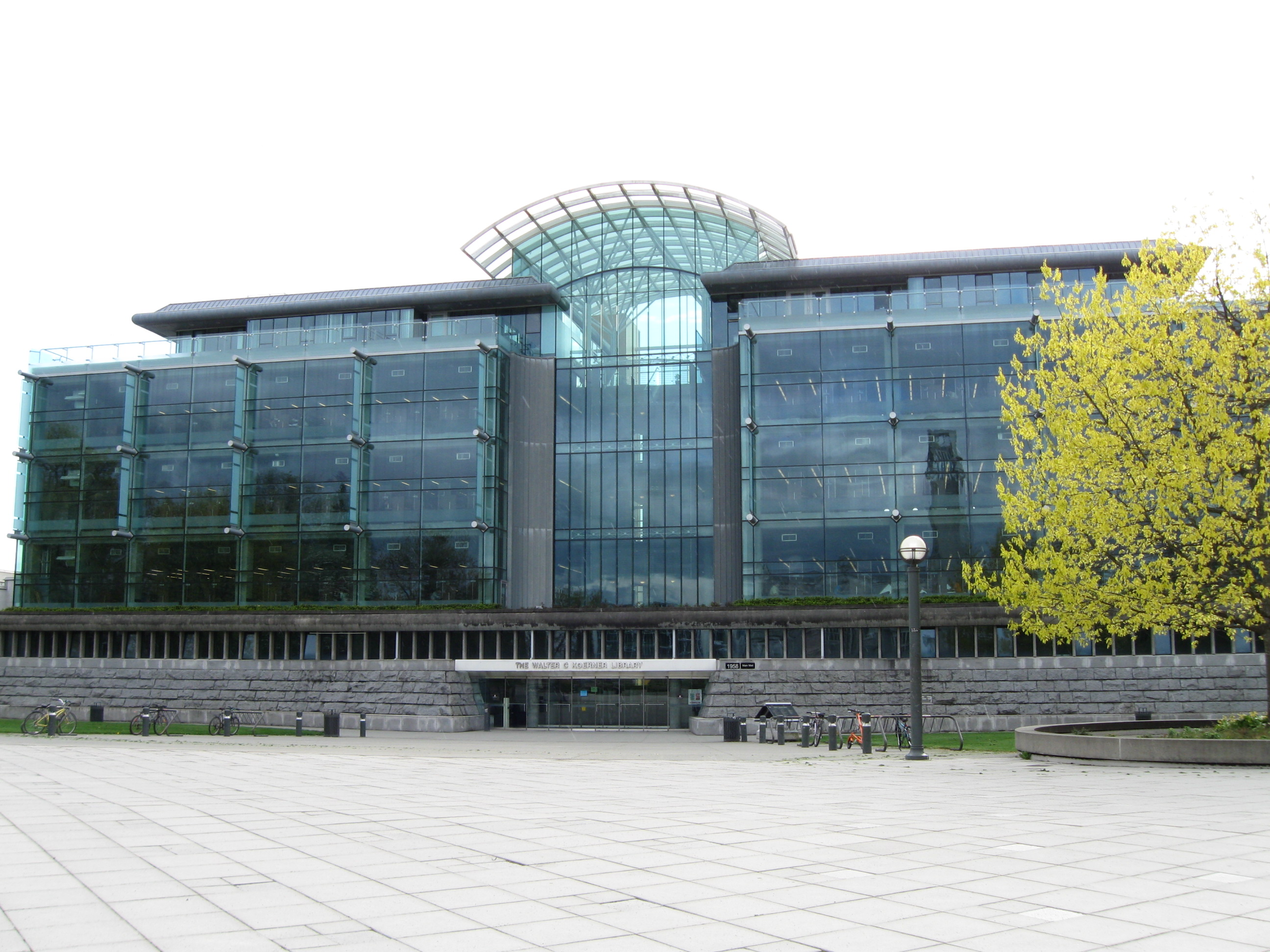
Walter Koerner Library, Vancouver

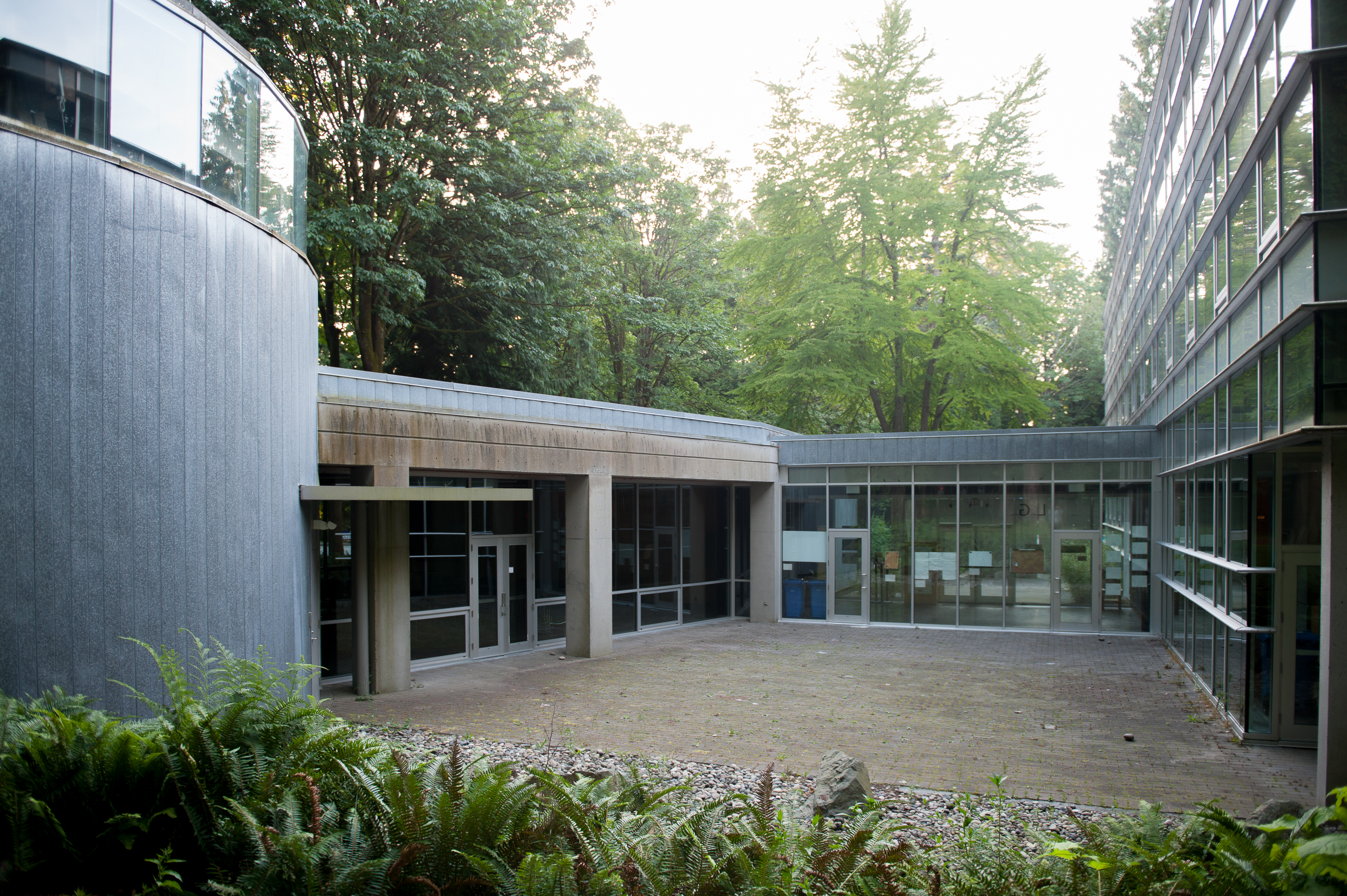
Liu Institute for Global Issues, Vancouver

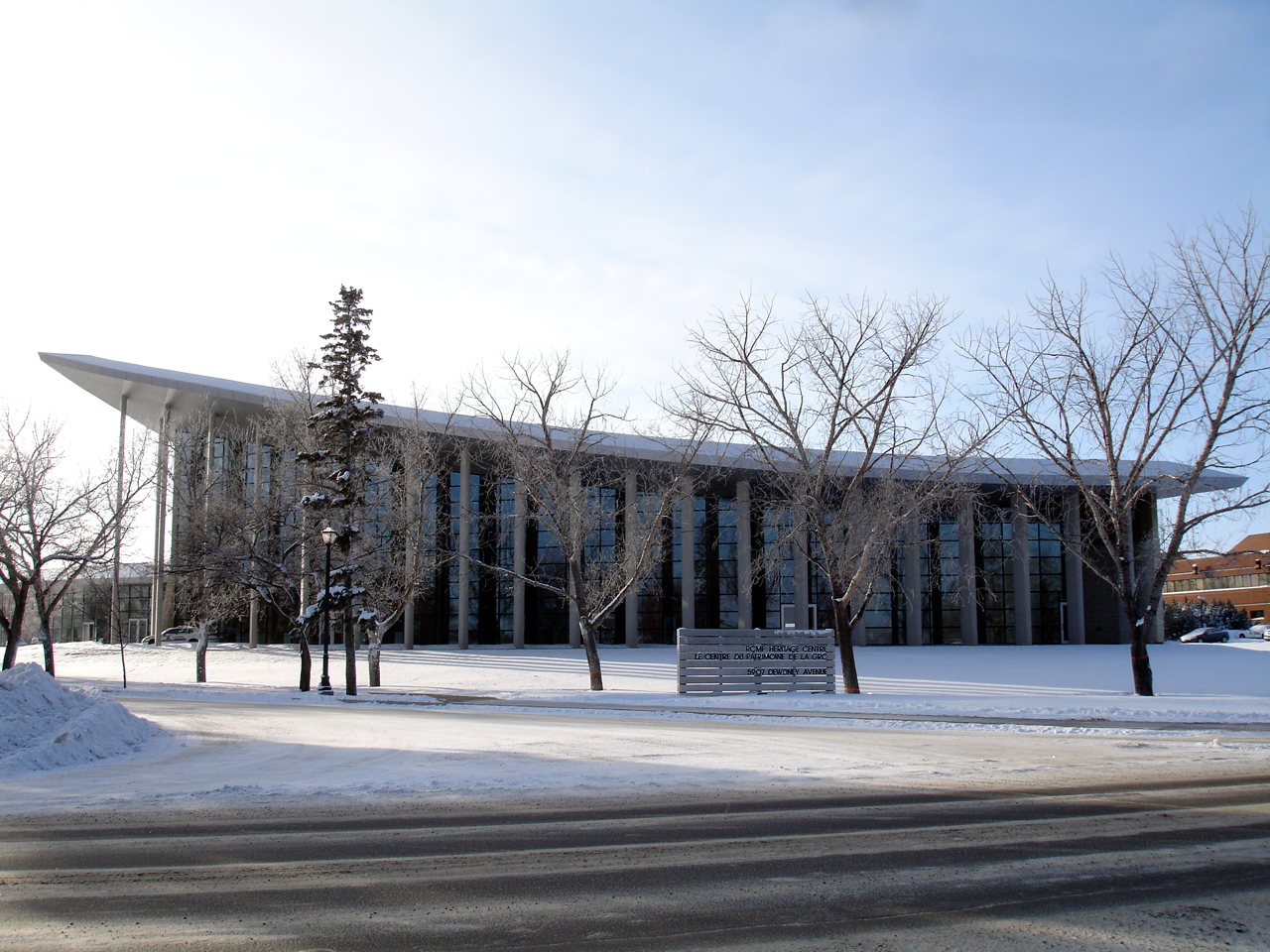
RCMP Heritage Centre, Regina

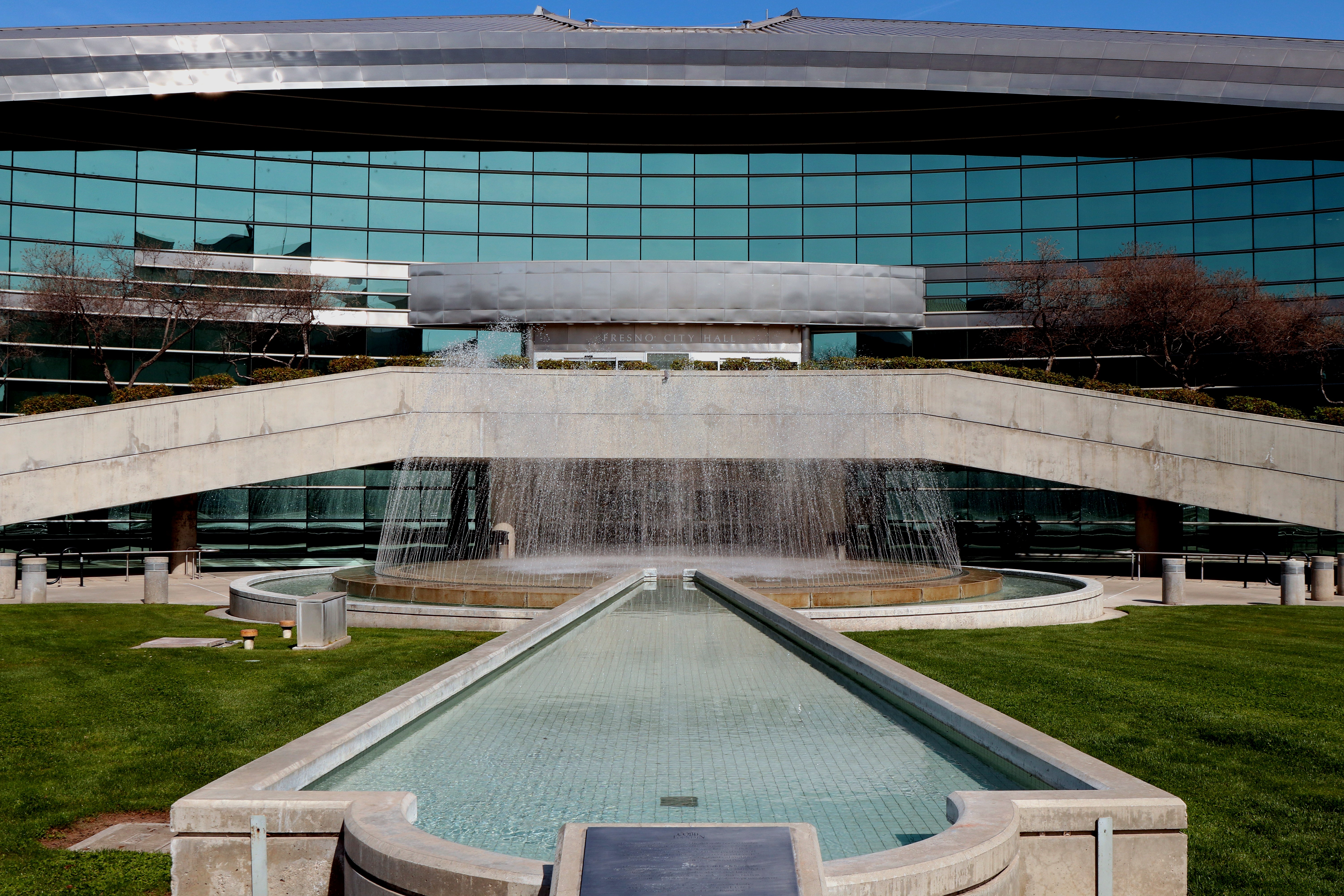
Fresno City Hall, Fresno, CA

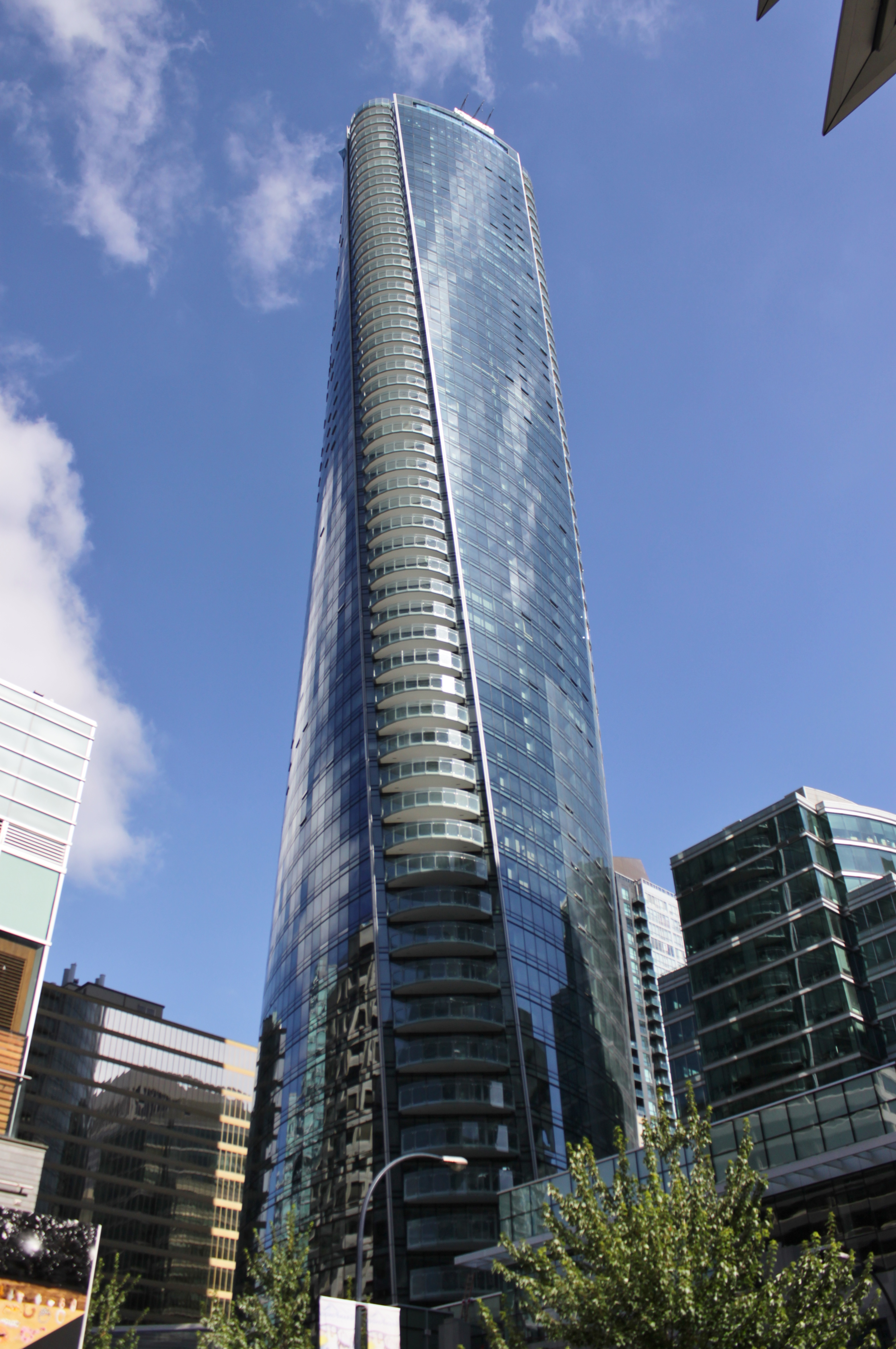
Paradox Hotel, Vancouver

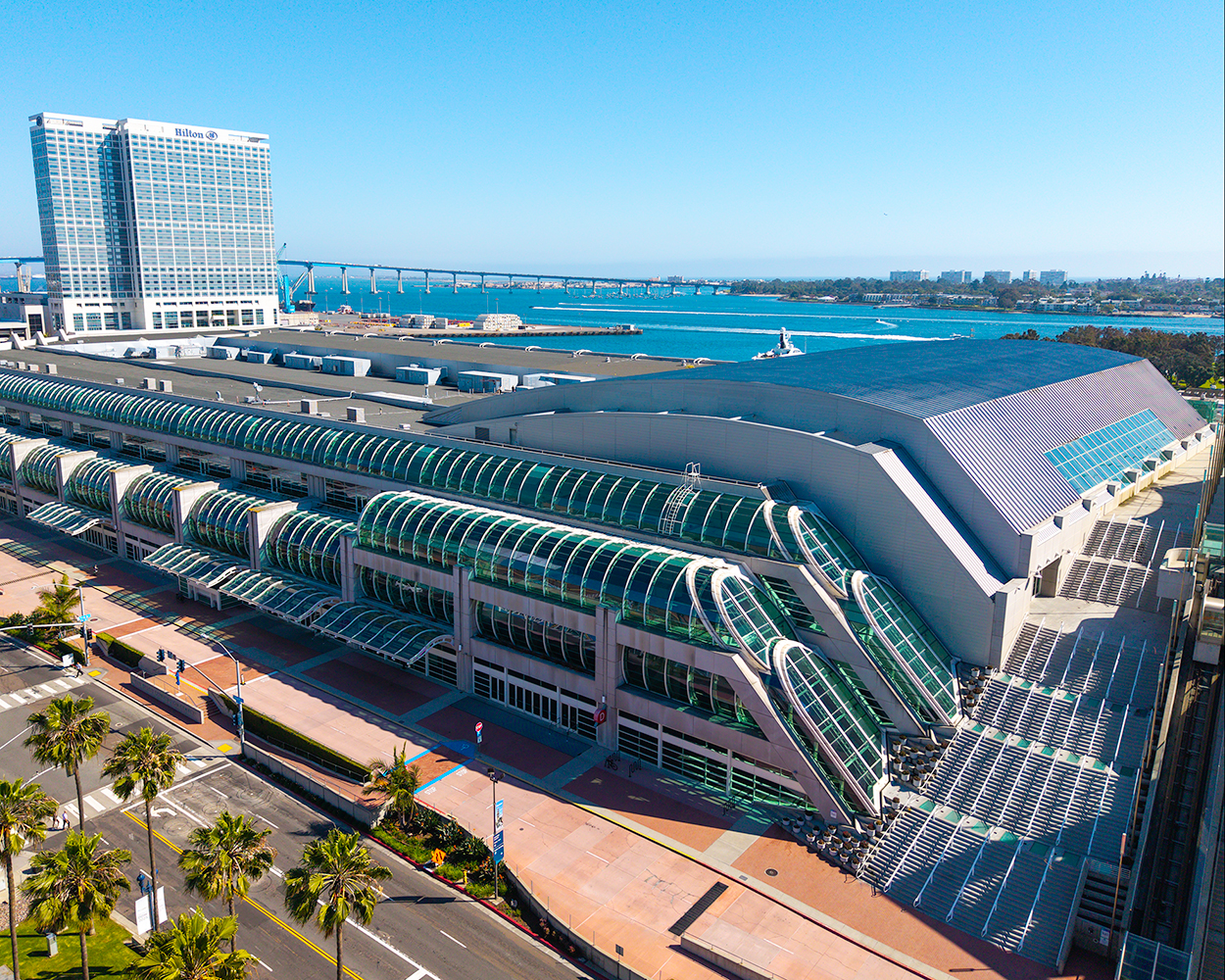
San Diego Convention Center

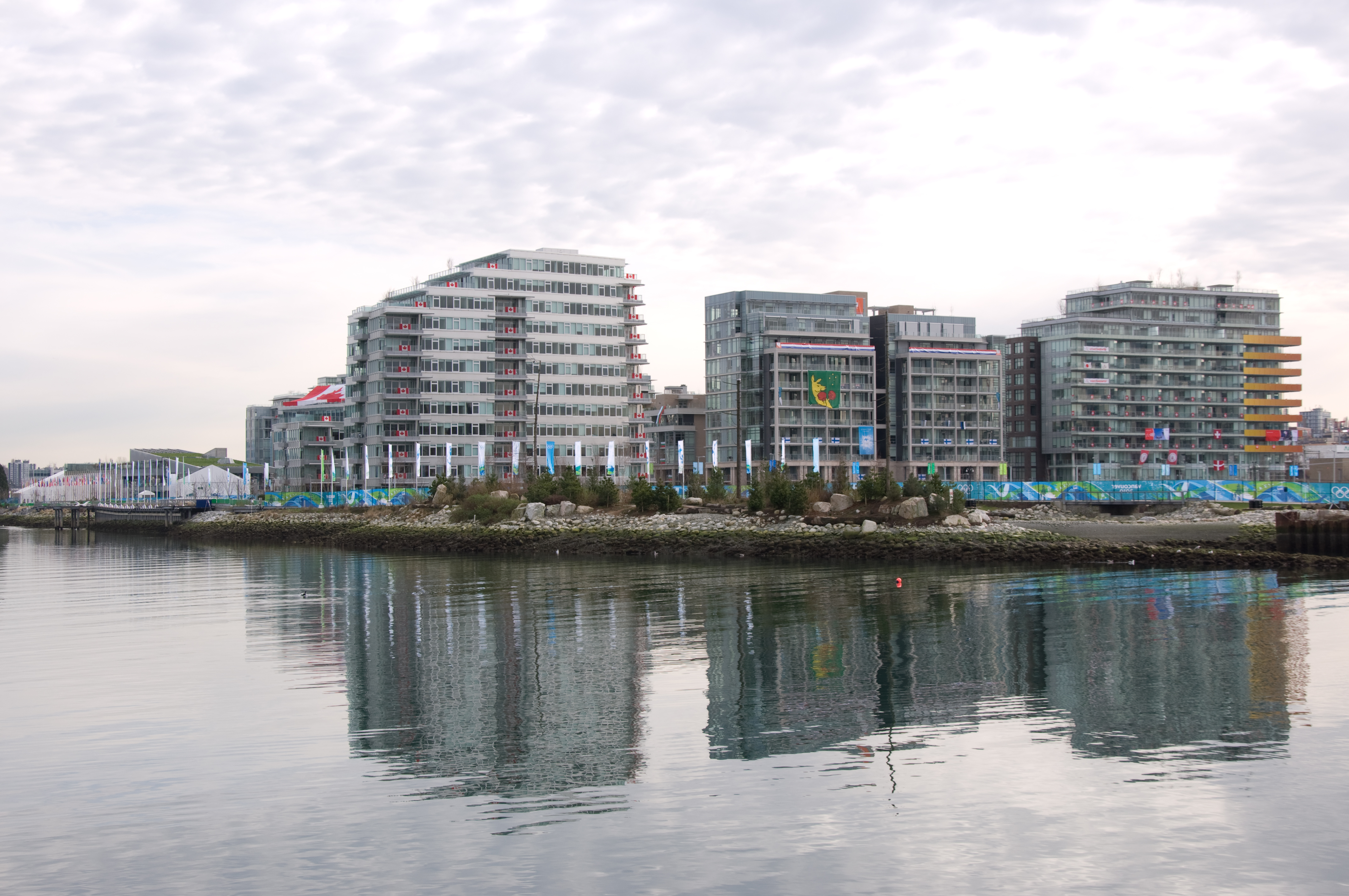
Canada House, Olympic Village, Vancouver

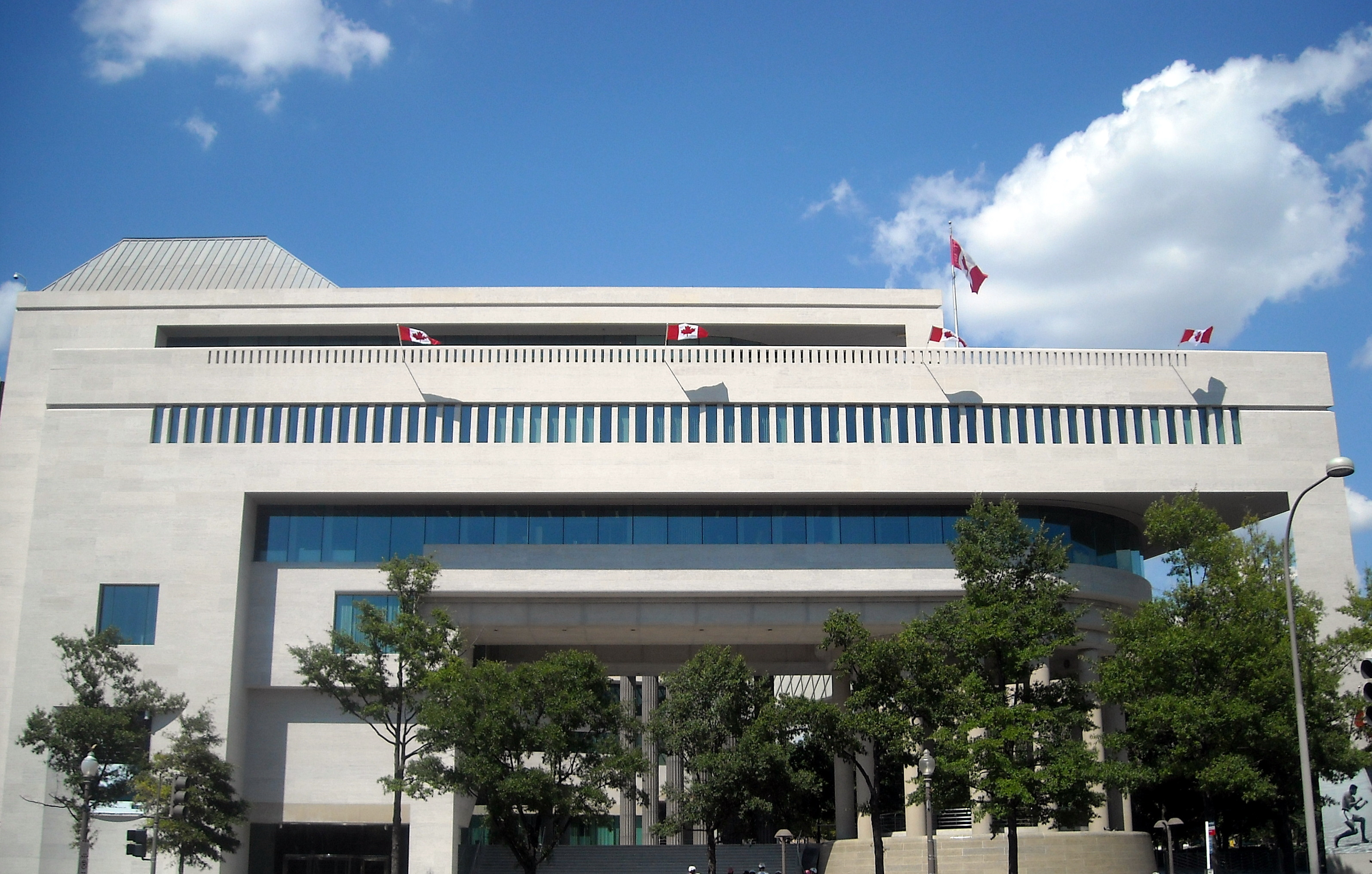
The Canadian Chancery Entrance

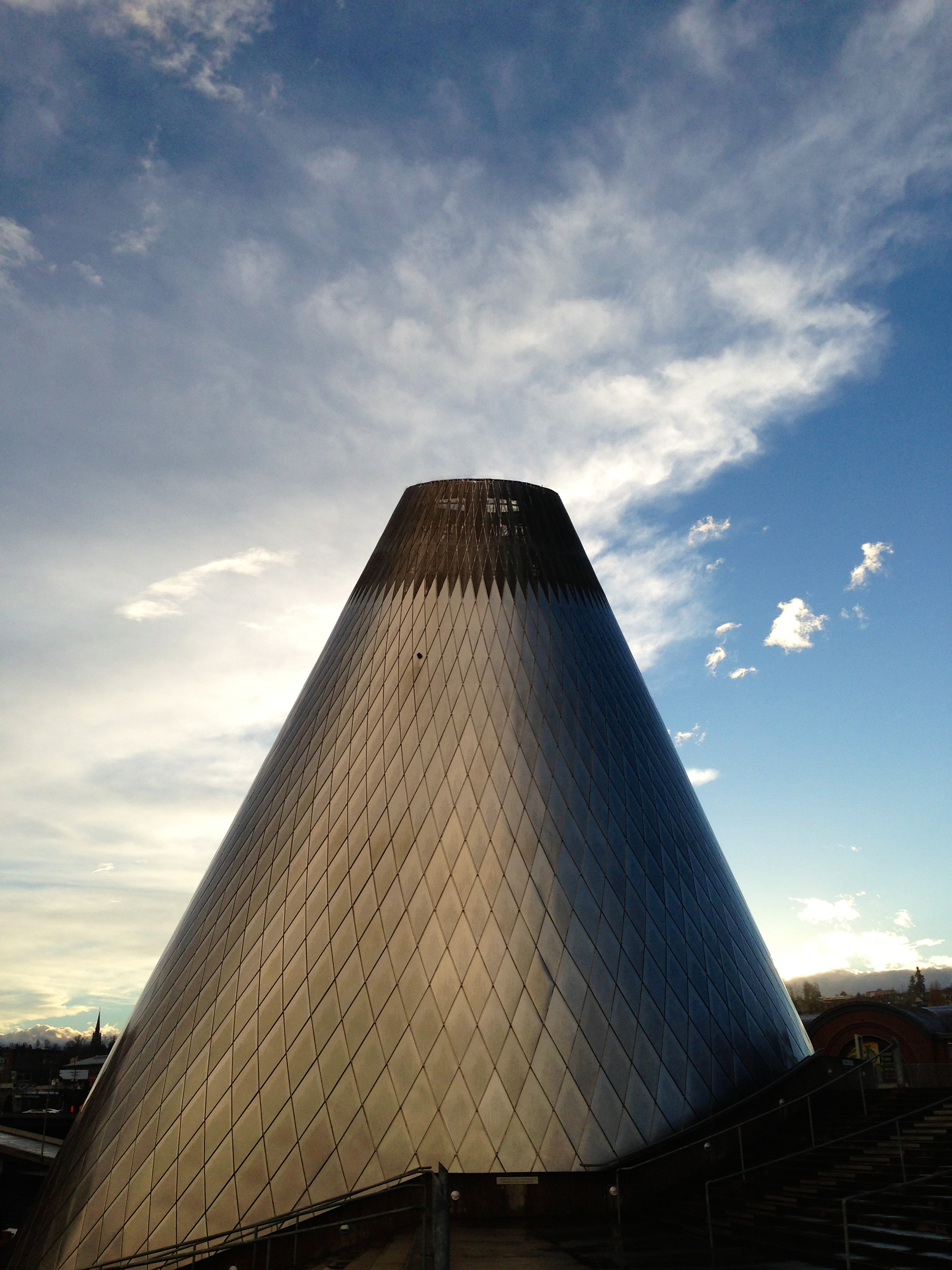
The Museum of Glass

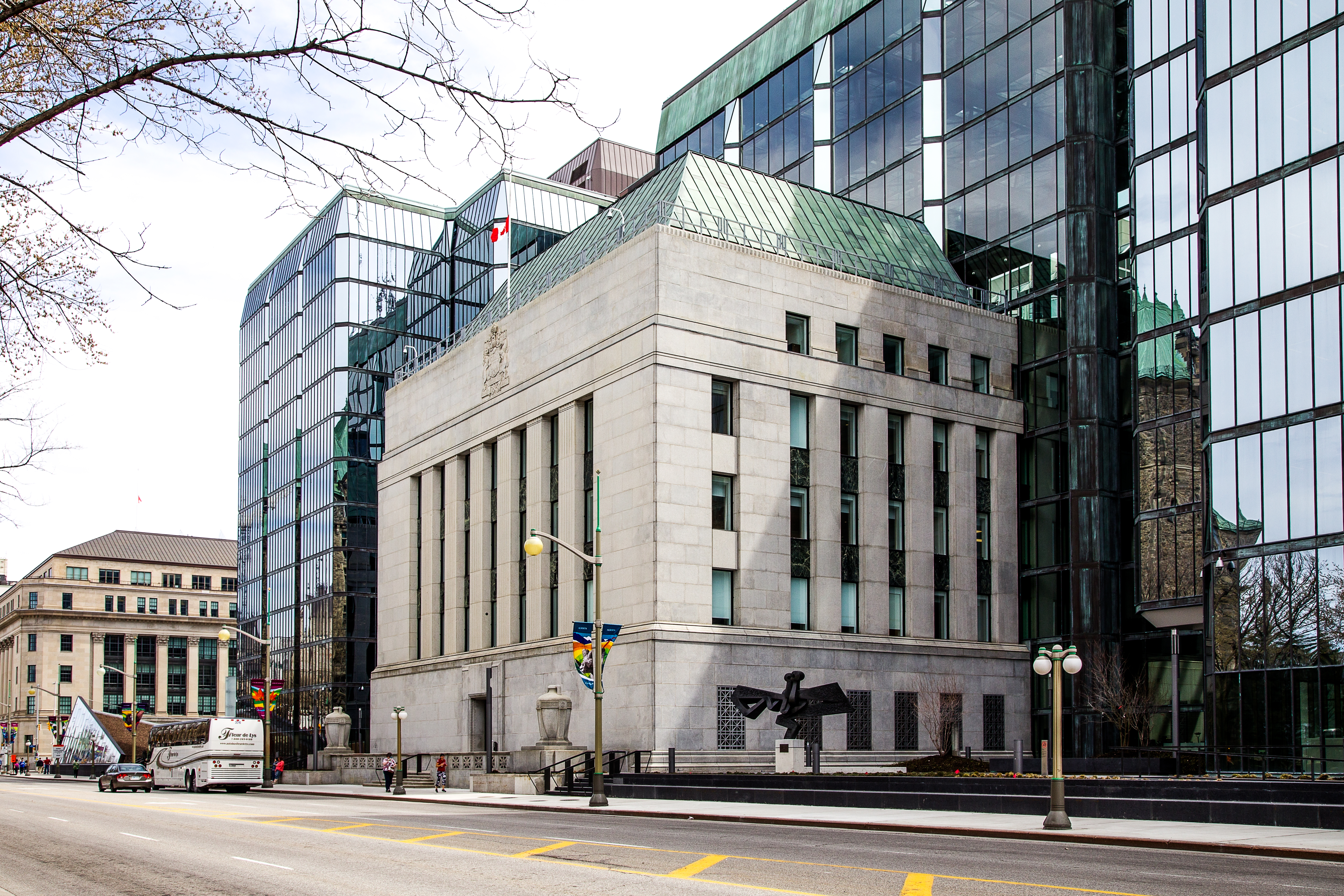
The Bank of Canada

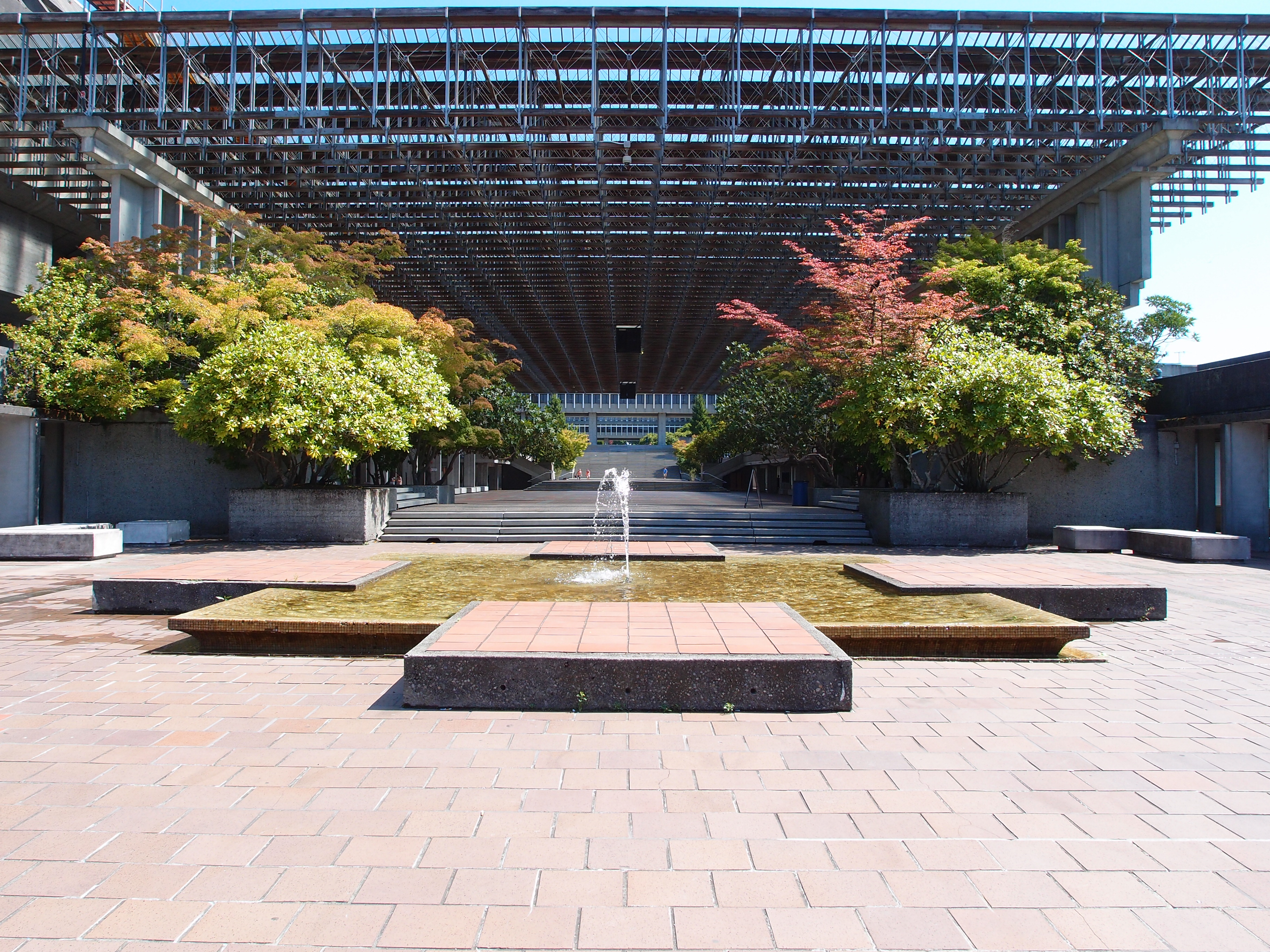
Simon Fraser University Courtyard

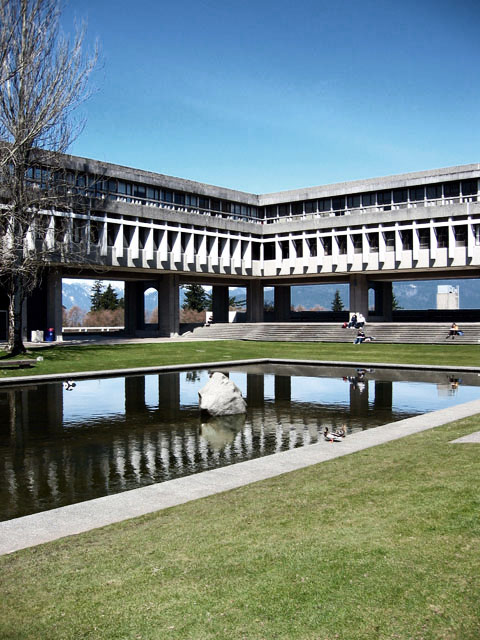
Simon Fraser University Quadrangle
