= List of founding members of the Canadian Academy of Engineering =

This is a list of the founding Fellows of the Canadian Academy of Engineering:

1. Pierre R. Bélanger
2. Lionel Boulet (1919–1996)
3. William Boyle
4. Angus A. Bruneau
5. Donald A. Chisholm (1927–2004)
6. J.V. Raymond Cyr
7. Camille A. Dagenais
8. Alan G. Davenport (1932–2009)
9. Colin D. diCenzo (1923–1992)
10. John T. Dyment (1904–2000)
11. Bernard Etkin
12. John S. Foster
13. William H. Gauvin (1913–1994)
14. Jean-Paul Gourdeau
15. George W. Govier
16. James M. Ham (1920–1997)
17. Richard D. Hiscocks
18. Larkin Kerwin (1924–2004)
19. Lesmere F. Kirkpatrick
20. Bernard Lamarre
21. Philip A. Lapp
22. Robert F. Legget (1904–1994)
23. Walter F. Light (1923–1996)
24. John S. MacDonald
25. Gordon M. MacNabb
26. James R. McFarlane
27. G. Geoffrey Meyerhof
28. William G. Morison
29. Leopold M. Nadeau
30. Barry G. Newman
31. Peter Nikiforuk
32. John L. Orr
33. Alphonse Ouimet (1908–1988)
34. Arthur Porter
35. W. Howard Rapson
36. Lucien Rolland
37. Robert F. Shaw
38. Leslie W. Shemilt
39. Ernest Siddall
40. Elvie L. Smith
41. Harold A. Smith
42. Donald R. Stanley
43. John B. Stirling
44. Douglas T. Wright
