= Michèle Thibodeau-DeGuire =

Canadian engineer (born c. 1941)

Michèle Thibodeau-DeGuire CM CQ
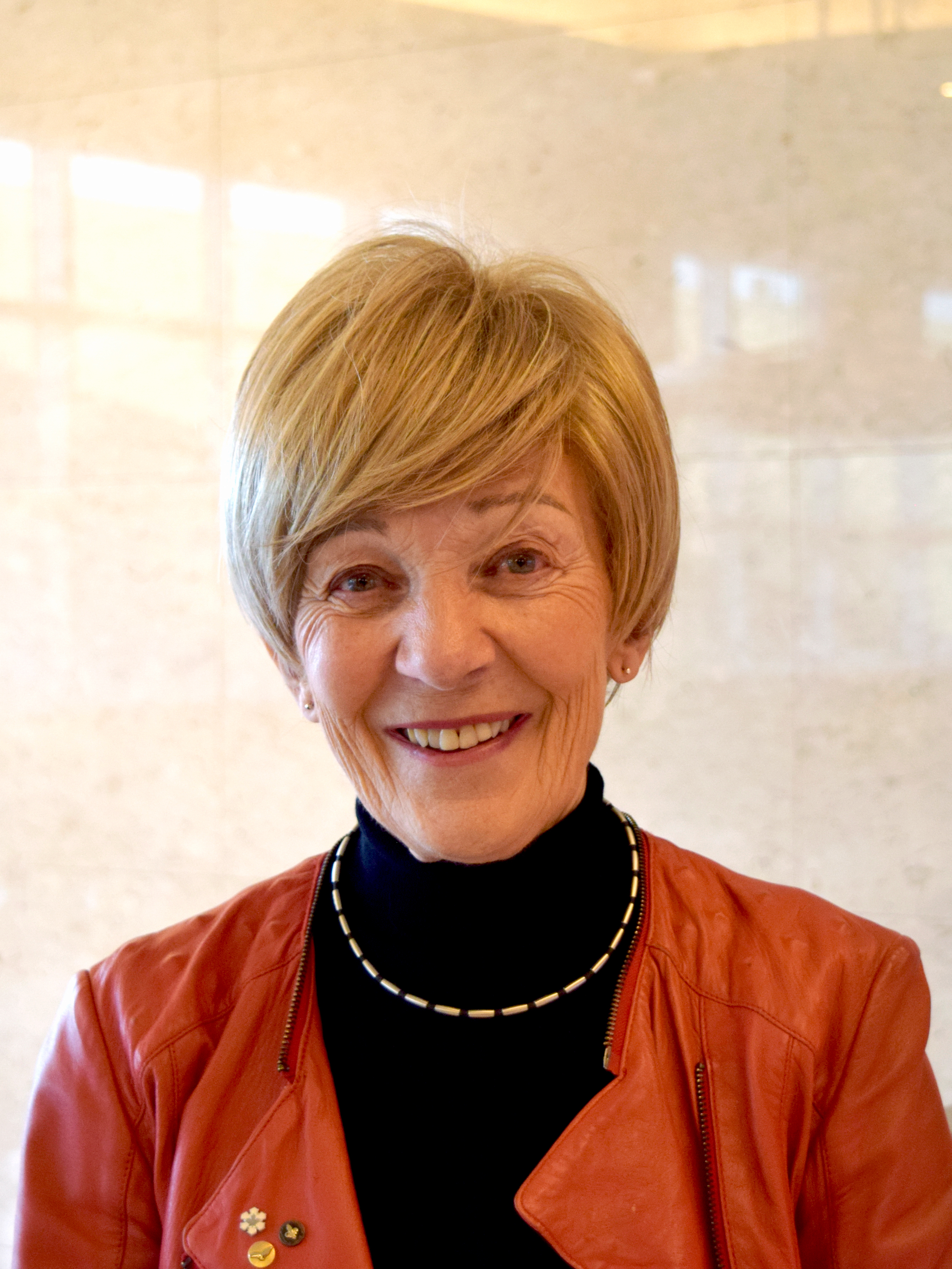
- Born: Michèle Thibodeau; 1941 (age 84–85); Montreal, Quebec, Canada
- Education: B.Eng
- Alma mater: École Polytechnique de Montréal
- Occupations: Engineer, administrator
- Known for: CEO of Centraide of Greater Montréal
- Board member of: Social Sciences and Humanities Research Council of Canada (SSHRC); Corporation of l’École Polytechnique de Montréal

Michèle Thibodeau-DeGuire CM CQ is a Canadian engineer born in Montreal, Quebec in 1941. The first woman to earn a degree in civil engineering, she was inducted into the Order of Canada in 2003, and made a Knight of the National Order of Quebec in 2005. She has been chair of the Board of Directors of the Corporation of École Polytechnique de Montréal since 2013.

== Biography ==
=== Early life and education ===
Michèle Thibodeau was the eldest of a family of four children. She received her diploma from Sacred Heart Convent in 1957. When she was 17, her father, an architect, encouraged her to enroll at École Polytechnique of Montréal. In 1963 she was the first woman to earn a degree in civil engineering. Also that year, she married Pierre-André DeGuire. (The honour of the first woman to graduate from the Polytechnique belongs to Gabrielle Bodis, Diplôme en mécanique–électricité, in 1959.)

=== Career ===
Thibodeau-DeGuire worked for nearly 20 years as a structural engineer, starting in 1963 with Lalonde Girouard Letendre. In 1975, she became a consulting engineer at Francis Boulva and Associates. She built several bridges and worked in particular on the construction of the walls of the Décarie Expressway.

From 1982 to 1984, Thibodeau-DeGuire served as General Delegate of Québec in Boston, maintaining relations with multiple levels of government in six states in the northeastern United States.

In 1985, Thibodeau-DeGuire joined the staff of École Polytechnique of Montréal, first as assistant to the president. In 1986, she became director of public relations. In December 1989, she was responsible for the institution's communication during and after the École Polytechnique massacre. The school president and director were in Europe.

Thibodeau-DeGuire was commended for her leadership throughout the crisis and in the organization of commemorative events and outreach which followed.

From April 1991 to 31 December 2012, Thibodeau-DeGuire was president and CEO of Centraide (English: The United Way) of Greater Montréal. She was at the origin of project "1, 2, 3, Go" which helped children in disadvantaged neighbourhoods. Under her leadership, fundraising increased from $23 million to $58.7 million, mainly through increasing major donors from 3,000 to 8,000.

In January 2013, Thibodeau-DeGuire succeeded Bernard Lamarre as Chairman of the Board of the Corporation of the École Polytechnique of Montréal with a five-year term.

In 2014, Thibodeau-DeGuire agreed to chair the selection committee for the Order of the White Rose, a $30,000 national scholarship for a female engineering graduate students. It was established in memory of the victims of the massacre 25 years earlier.

In 2013 Centraide launched the Michèle-Thibodeau-DeGuire Award, which annually recognizes an outstanding volunteer of the charity.

== Awards ==
- Member of the Canadian Academy of Engineering (1991)
- Merit Award from the Alumni Association of École Polytechnique de Montréal (1994)
- Builder of the Month, Revue Commerce (1994)
- Order of Merit of the Alumni Association of the Université de Montréal (1995)
- Grand Prix of Excellence of the Order of Engineers of Quebec (1995)
- Award from the Canadian Council of Professional Engineers (1995)
- Personality of the Year, Richelieu International (1999)
- Personality of the Year, Les Affaires (1999)
- McGill Management Achievement Award (2001)
- Grands Montrélais of the Académie des Grands Montrélais (2001)
- Member of the Order of Canada (2003)
- Award from the John Molson School of Business at Concordia University (2003)
- Knight of the National Order of Quebec (2005)
- Honorary Doctorate of the University of Montréal (HEC)(2005)
- Honorary Doctorate from Concordia University (2006)
- Honorary Doctorate from the Université du Québec à Montréal (2007)
- Honorary Doctorate from McGill University (2008)
- Fellow of Engineers Canada (2011)
- Honorary Doctorate from the University of Ottawa (2012)

== Board of directors ==
- 1965–1978: Association of graduates of the École Polytechnique de Montréal
- 1993–1999: Natural Sciences and Engineering Research Council (NSERC)
- 1998–2004: Canadian Policy Research Networks (CPRN)
- 2007–present: Social Sciences and Humanities Research Council of Canada (SSHRC)
- 2013–present: Corporation of the École Polytechnique de Montréal
