= Jacques Lamarre =

Canadian businessman and civil engineer

Jacques Lamarre is a Canadian businessman and civil engineer. He became the CEO of SNC-Lavalin, one of the largest engineering corporations in the world, in 1996 and left his post in 2009. He earned his Bachelor of Arts degree and a Bachelor of Arts and Science in civil engineering from Université Laval in Quebec City. He also attended Harvard University's Executive Development Program.

In November 1994, he was appointed executive vice-president, SNC-Lavalin Group Inc. In May 1996, Jacques Lamarre was named president and chief executive officer.

Jacques has an older brother, Bernard Lamarre, who controlled Groupe Lavalin in the early 1990s, and was the president of the Board of the École Polytechnique de Montréal from 2002 to 2012.

Jacques Lamarre is a member of the Engineering Institute of Canada, the Association of Consulting Engineers of Canada and l'Ordre des ingénieurs du Québec. Lamarre became a member of the Order of Canada in 2005; however, in 2026, he was stripped of these honours.

On November 12, 2009, Mr Lamarre was appointed to the board of directors of Suncor Energy Inc, Canada's largest energy company.

On January 1, 2010, Mr. Lamarre joined the Canadian law firm of Heenan Blaikie as counsel, where he provided strategic counsel to clients on major infrastructure projects and finance. The firm is now defunct.
