= Monica Emelko =

Civil and environmental engineer

Monica Beata Emelko is a Canadian civil and environmental engineer who has been called "the first researcher to identify climate change–associated threats to water security, such as the deterioration of and fluctuations in water quality after wildfires and floods". Educated in the United States and Canada, she works in Canada at the University of Waterloo, as a professor in the Department of Civil and Environmental Engineering, Canada Research Chair in Water Science, Technology & Policy, and director of the Water Science, Technology & Policy Group. She also heads the forWater Network, a network of water researchers across Canada.

== Education ==
Emelko has a double baccalaureate from the Massachusetts Institute of Technology: a degree in chemical engineering in 1993 and a second degree in environmental engineering science in 1994. She went on to earn a master's degree in civil engineering at the University of California, Los Angeles in 1995, before completing her Ph.D. in civil engineering at the University of Waterloo in 2001. Her doctoral dissertation, Removal of Cryptosporidium parvum by granular media filtration, was supervised by Peter Huck.

== Recognition ==
Emelko was given a tier 1 Canada Research Chair in Water Science, Technology and Policy in 2020. She was elected to the Canadian Academy of Engineering in 2023.
