= Zykov =

Zykov (masculine) or Zykova (feminine) is a Russian surname. Notable people with the surname include:

- Valeri Zykov, Soviet footballer
- Nikolai Zykov, Soviet and Russian actor, director, artist, designer, puppet-maker and puppeteer
- Pyotr Zykov, Soviet general
- Valentin Zykov, Russian ice hockey player

== See also ==
- Zykov Island, island in Antarctica
- Zykov Glacier, glacier in Antarctica
- Danielle Zaikoff, Canadian engineer
