= Sendall =

Sendall is a surname. Notable people with the surname include:

- Bernard Sendall (1913-1996), British civil servant
- Kathleen E. Sendall, Canadian engineer
- Shuna Scott Sendall (born 1975), Scottish soprano
- Walter Joseph Sendall (1832–1904), British colonial governor
