= Norman C. Beaulieu =

Canadian engineer

- Born: Norman Charles Joseph Beaulieu; November 8, 1951 (age 74); Vancouver, British Columbia
- Education: University of British Columbia
- Known for: Ultrawide bandwidth systems Broadband digital communications systems
- Awards: IEEE COMSOC Edwin Armstrong Award, 2007; 2005 Thomas W. Eadie Medal
- Scientific career
- Fields: Electrical engineer and Mathematician
- Workplaces: Beijing University of Posts and Telecommunications; Queen's University; University of Alberta

Norman Charles Joseph Beaulieu (born November 8, 1958, in Vancouver, British Columbia) is a Canadian engineer and former professor in the ECE department of the University of Alberta.

== Education ==
He received the B.Sc. (honors), M.Sc., and Ph.D. degrees in electrical engineering from the University of British Columbia, Vancouver, in 1980, 1983, and 1986, respectively. He was a Queen's National Scholar Assistant Professor with the Department of Electrical Engineering, Queen's University, Kingston, Ontario, Canada, from September 1986 to June 1988, an associate professor from July 1988 to June 1993, and a professor from July 1993 to August 2000. In September 2000, he became the iCORE Research Chair Professor in Broadband wireless communications at the University of Alberta, Edmonton, and in January 2001, the Canada Research Chair in Broadband Wireless Communications.

== Research ==
His current research interests include broadband digital communications systems, ultrawide bandwidth systems, fading channel modeling and simulation, diversity systems, interference prediction and cancellation, importance sampling and semi-analytical methods, decision-feedback equalization, and space-time coding.

== Services ==
Beaulieu is a member of the IEEE Communication Theory Committee and served as its representative to the Technical Program Committee of the 1991 International Conference on Communications (ICC) and as co-representative to the Technical Program Committee of the 1993 ICC and the 1996 ICC. He was general chair of the Sixth Communication Theory Mini-Conference in association with GLOBECOM’97 and co-chair of the Canadian Workshop on Information Theory 1999.

He has been an editor for Wireless Communication Theory of the IEEE Transactions on Communications since January 1992, and was editor-in-chief from January 2000 to December 2003. He served as an associate editor for Wireless Communication Theory of the IEEE Communications Letters from November 1996 to August 2003. He served on the editorial board of the Proceedings of the IEEE from November 2000 to December 2006.

== Awards ==
He was awarded the University of British Columbia Special University Prize in Applied Science in 1980 as the highest standing graduate in the faculty of Applied Science. He received the Natural Science and Engineering Research Council of Canada (NSERC)'s E.W. R. Steacie Memorial Fellowship in 1999. He was elected a fellow of the Engineering Institute of Canada in 2001 and awarded the Médaille K. Y. Lo Medal of the Institute in 2004. He was elected fellow of the Royal Society of Canada in 2002, and awarded the Thomas W. Eadie Medal of the Society in 2005.

He was also awarded the Alberta Science and Technology Leadership Foundation ASTech Outstanding Leadership in Alberta Technology Award in 2005. In 2006, he was elected fellow of the Canadian Academy of Engineering. He is the 2006 recipient of the J. Gordin Kaplan Award for Excellence in Research, the University of Alberta’s most prestigious research prize. Professor Beaulieu is the recipient of the IEEE Communications Society Edwin Howard Armstrong Achievement Award for 2007.

- 1999 – Elected IEEE Fellow "for contributions to the analysis and modeling of wireless data and digital communication systems"
- 1999 – Edgar William Richard Steacie Prize
- 2001 – Fellow of the Engineering Institute of Canada
- 2002 – Fellow of the Royal Society of Canada
- 2005 – Thomas W. Eadie Medal

== Links ==
- Beaulieu v. University of Alberta, 2013 ABQB 237
- Beaulieu v University of Alberta, 2014 ABCA 137
- Norman C. Beaulieu v. Governors of the University of Alberta

== Sources ==
- Author profile in the database zbMATH
