= Sehon =

Sehon is a surname. Notable people with the surname include:

- Alec Sehon (1924–2018), Romanian-born Canadian immunologist
- John L. Sehon (1862–1913), American politician
- Scott Sehon (born 1963), American philosopher and professor
