= Garry Rempel =

Garry Rempel CC
- Born: Garry Llewellyn Rempel; 1944; Regina, Saskatchewan, Canada
- Died: November 2, 2018 (aged 73–74); Kitchener, Ontario, Canada
- Resting place: Waterloo, Ontario
- Citizenship: Canada
- Education: University of British Columbia
- Known for: hydrogenation of nitrile rubbers, creation of high-performance elastomers
- Spouse: Flora Ng
- Scientific career
- Fields: chemical engineering, polymer science
- Workplaces: University of Waterloo
- Doctoral advisor: Brian James

Garry L. Rempel CC (1944 – November 2, 2018) was a Canadian scientist specializing in chemical engineering, applied catalysis and polymer science, and known for his pioneering work on hydrogenation of nitrile rubbers. He was a professor at the University of Waterloo, Fellow of the Royal Society of Canada since 1992 and President of the Academy of Science of the Royal Society of Canada in 2001–2003. In 2015 he was created a Member of the Order of Canada.

== Personal life ==
Garry Llewellyn Rempel was born in 1944 in Regina, Saskatchewan and received first his BSc degree (in 1965) and then his PhD degree (in 1968) from the University of British Columbia. Rempel's doctoral advisor was Brian James, with whom he co-authored his first scientific paper in 1966. After finishing his PhD studies, he took NATO Postdoctoral Fellowship at the Imperial College London, and since 1969 was working at the University of Waterloo as an assistant professor.

In 1980, Rempel was promoted to become a professor and from 1988 to 1996 he was Chair of the Department of Chemical Engineering at the University of Waterloo. In 2004, he received the honorary title of university professor. Overall, Rempel worked at Waterloo University for 50 years, until the year of his death. He died at St. Mary's General Hospital (Kitchener, Ontario) in November 2018, at the age of 74, with his wife of 43 years, Professor Flora Ng, at his side.

== Scientific achievements ==
Dr. Rempel's main research interests in the field of chemical engineering were applied catalysis and polymer science. He was known for his pioneering research on hydrogenation of nitrile rubbers, which he was conducting since the early 1980s. In the following decades he has made substantial progress applying this work industrially. By the late 1980s, Dr. Rempel started patenting technologies of producing high-performance elastomers using transition metal complexes as catalysts.

Dr. Rempel worked closely with rubber manufacturers in developing chemical processes intended to upgrade production of high-performance rubber materials. Technologies developed by him allowed to produce materials used by automotive manufacturers in order to reduce emissions and increase fuel efficiency. In total, Dr. Rempel has authored or co-authored more than 400 publications and held 35 patents over his scientific career.

== Titles and awards ==
In 1992, Garry Rempel has been appointed a Fellow with the Royal Society of Canada. In 2001—2003 he was serving as the President, Academy of Science of the Royal Society of Canada (one of 3 academies comprising the Society) and Vice-President of the Royal Society of Canada.

In 2015, Dr. Rempel was created a Member of the Order of Canada for his achievements in the development of high-performance rubbers and training of numerous graduate students. He was also awarded the Queen Elizabeth II Diamond Jubilee Medal (in 2013), Catalysis Medal from the Chemical Institute of Canada, RS Jane Memorial Award from the Canadian Society for Chemical Engineering, the Thomas W. Eadie Medal from the Royal Society of Canada, LeSueur Memorial Award from the Society of Chemical Industry, the University-Industry Research and Development Award from the Natural Sciences and Engineering Research Council of Canada and the Conference Board of Canada, and the Canadian Gold medal for Business Excellence (in the Invention category).
