= Micheline Bouchard =

Canadian engineer

Micheline Bouchard CM CQ
- Education: Université de Montréal
- Engineering career
- Institutions: Canadian Academy of Engineering

Micheline Bouchard CM CQ is a Canadian engineer. In 2000, Bouchard became the first woman to serve as president of the Canadian Academy of Engineering. She was an engineer for Hydro-Québec.

== Education ==
Bouchard graduated in engineering physics in 1969 and received her master's in electrical engineering in 1978 from L’École Polytechnique de Montréal.

She completed the Kellogg Institute Executive Management Program in 2001, and is a member of the Institute of Corporate Directors.

== Career ==
A 1969 graduate in engineering physics from L’École Polytechnique de Montréal, followed by a master's in electrical engineering from the same institution nine years later, Bouchard's first professional job was with Hydro-Québec, where she remained for 18 years, taking increasingly more senior appointments, including assistant to the president. These were followed by senior leadership and business development appointments as vice-president with the CGI Group, the DMR Group, and Hewlett-Packard (Canada) Ltd. In 1998 she was appointed president and chief operating executive (CEO) of Motorola Canada Ltd. and was later promoted to be a vice president of Motorola Inc. She served from 2002 to 2006 as president and CEO of ART Advanced Research Technologies Ltd.

Bouchard has served on the boards of Telus Corporation, Dominion Diamond Corporation, the Ford Motor Company of Canada, Sears Canada, Corby Distilleries, the Banque Nationale de Paris (Canada), London Life, Gaz Metropolitan, Alliance Forest Products, Monsanto Canada, and the Canada Post Corporation. She sits on the board of PSP (Public Sector Pension Investments) and is the chair of the human resources and compensation committee.

Between 1983 and 1987 she was vice president of the Montréal Chamber of Commerce, from 1989 until 1992 served the Montréal Board of Trade, and from 1987 until 1992 was a founding director of the Public Policy Forum. She also served on the Conference Board of Canada and on the International Women's Forum global board. She is a director of the Canadian Foundation for Innovation.

In 1978, Micheline Bouchard was the second woman to be elected to lead the Order of Engineers in Québec and, in 1992, the second to be elected president of the Canadian Council of Professional Engineers (now Engineers Canada). She was not only the first woman president of the Canadian Academy of Engineering, but was the first to be elected president of any of the twenty-odd academies represented in the international Council of Academies of Engineering and Technological Sciences.

She was an early advocate of the participation of women in the engineering profession and her years as an executive have helped enhance the role of women in the business of engineering.

== Awards and recognition ==
Bouchard became a Member of the Order of Canada in 1995 and a Knight of the National Order of Québec in 2011 for her services to Canada and Québec. She was named a Fellow of Engineers Canada in 2009 and, in 2015, was awarded this institution's gold medal. She also received, in 2015, the Grand Prix d’Excellence of the Order of Engineers of Québec as well as being named to the list of Top 100 Most Powerful Women. In 1981 she won the Woman of the Year (Business) Award. She has been a YWCA Woman of the Year in 1994 and, in 2000, received a Wired Woman of the Year award from the Wired Women's Society. The academic world, through Ryerson University, McMaster University, Montréal, University of Waterloo and Ottawa Universities, has recognized her contributions through the award of honorary doctorates. She has also been a member of the board of trustees of Thunderbird University in Arizona.

Micheline Bouchard is the widow of fellow engineer Jean-Paul Sardin. She a son and daughter.
