= Thomas W. Eadie Medal =

Canadian engineering and applied science award

The Thomas W. Eadie Medal is an award of the Royal Society of Canada "for contributions in engineering and applied science". It is named in honour of Thomas Wardrope Eadie and is awarded annually. The award consists of a bronze medal and Can$3,000 of cash. The award appears to have been discontinued.

== Recipients ==
The following people received the Thomas W. Eadie Medal:

- 2009 - Ke Wu
- 2008 - M. Jamal Deen
- 2007 - Hussein T. Mouftah
- 2006 - Alberto Leon-Garcia
- 2005 - Norman C. Beaulieu, FRSC
- 2004 - Vijay K. Bhargava, FRSC
- 2003 - Morrel P. Bachynski, FRSC
- 2001 - Gregor v. Bochmann, FRSC
- 2000 - Brian Evans Conway, FRSC
- 1999 - Nicolas D. Georganas, FRSC
- 1997 - F. Stuart Foster, FRSC
- 1996 - Christian Roy
- 1995 - Edward M. Donaldson, FRSC
- 1994 - Raymond Bartnikas, MSRC
- 1993 - Garry L. Rempel, FRSC
- 1991 - Ernest A. McCulloch, FRSC & James E. Till, FRSC
- 1990 - F. Peter Ottensmeyer
- 1989 - Ashok K. Vijh, FRSC
- 1988 - Arthur A. Axelrad, FRSC
- 1987 - Alexander McLean
- 1986 - William H. Gauvin, FRSC
- 1985 - Elvie L. Smith
- 1984 - Garry Martin Lindberg & Karl-Heinrich Doetsch, and John D. MacNaughton & Terrence H. Ussher
- 1983 - Colin K. Campbell
- 1982 - Bernhard Cinader, FRSC
- 1981 - W. Howard Rapson, FRSC
- 1980 - Bernard Etkin, FRSC
- 1979 - Armand Frappier, MSRC
- 1978 - A. Jacques Beaulieu
- 1977 - Alec Sehon, FRSC
- 1976 - John W. Hilborn
- 1975 - Marshall Kulka, FRSC

== See also ==
- List of engineering awards
