= Danielle Zaikoff =

French-Canadian Geotechnical Engineer

Danielle W. Zaikoff
- Education: Marie de France College (1962) École Polytechnique de Montréal,BSc Civil Engineering (1967) École Polytechnique de Montréal,MSc Civil Engineering with Soil Mechanics (1972)
- Occupation: Engineer
- Employer: Hydro-Quebec (1967-1998) Électricité de France (1998-2004)

Danielle W. Zaikoff is a French-Canadian geo-technical Engineer. She was the first woman to become the president of the Ordre des ingénieurs du Québec (OIQ) and of the Canadian Council of Professional Engineers as well as the first woman to become a member of the Canadian Academy of Engineering.

== Education ==
When she was 10 years old, Zaikoff moved to Montreal, Canada. Zaikoff went to school at Collège Marie de France and went on to study Civil Engineering at École Polytechnique de Montréal. She was the only woman in her cohort. Zaikoff returned to study for her Masters in Geotechnical Engineering, securing a scholarship from her employer and graduating in 1972.

== Career ==
After finishing her BSc in 1967, Zaikoff joined the Contract Department at Hydro-Quebec. At the time, she had to get an office-based role as women were not allowed to work on site or in the field.

Zaikoff then moved to the Geotechnical Department eventually becoming the head of the department. She went on to become the head of the Dam Performance Section and then Director of Plant Engineering. She was the first female Director at Hydro-Quebec.

In 1995, Zaikoff became the Executive Director of E7 International Network Secretariat, which is now known as the Global Sustainable Electricity Partnership. After leaving Hydro-Quebec in 1998 she joined Électricité de France and became a Liaison Officer for the North America, E7 Sustainable Energy Development Fund.

Zaikoff retired in 2004 and spent more time on painting.

== Other activities ==
In 1975, Zaikoff became the first woman President of the Ordre des ingénieurs du Québec (OIQ) and in 1978 became the first woman President of the Canadian Council of Professional Engineers Further, Zaikoff became the first woman to become a member of the Canadian Academy of Engineering.

In 2023, Zaikoff was awarded an honorary doctorate by her alma mater, École Polytechnique de Montréal.

== Personal life ==
Zaikoff's father advised her that she could continue to be a painter whilst having a career in engineering. Her husband Pierre also works in engineering. They have two children.
