= P. Kim Sturgess =

Canadian engineer

P. Kim Sturgess, C.M. is a Canadian engineer. In 2011, she was president of the Canadian Academy of Engineering. Sturgess has been involved in the development of water projects and systems for several companies, as well as policy development for industrial and government clients. A technology start-up entrepreneur and manager, she is involved with improving the management of, and education about, Alberta’s water resources.

== Education ==
Sturgess graduated from Queen's University with a degree in engineering physics in 1977. As an undergraduate, she was treasurer of Queen's Engineering Society Services. Later, she was on the Queen's University Council, its board of trustees, and its board of directors. In 1984, she received a master's degree from the University of Western Ontario. In 2006, she completed her ICD.D designation of the Institute of Corporate Directors.

== Career ==
Prior to attending the University of Western Ontario, Sturgess worked in Alberta as an engineer with the National Energy Board and Esso Resources Canada Ltd. Subsequently, she was an energy and transportation consultant with McKinsey & Company, before becoming involved in developing a series of startup engineering companies, including as Chief Executive Officer (CEO) of Revolve Technologies and Revolve Magnetic Bearings.

Sturgess was the founder and CEO of WaterSMART Solutions Ltd., a service organization committed to the improvement of water management through better engineering. For 18 years she was on the Board of Directors at WaterSMART Solutions. In November 2024, WaterSMART Solutions was acquired by Hazen and Sawyer.

She also founded the Canada WaterPortal Society, which provides water education internationally, and was on the Board of Directors for 18 years.

Sturgess has been on the boards of the Calgary Airport Authority, the Canadian Chamber of Commerce, the National Research Council, the Pressure Pipeline Inspection Company, CCI Thermal Technologies, the Alberta Economic Development Authority, the Alberta Water Council, the Calgary Science Centre, the Chairman's Circle of the Southern Alberta Institute of Technology, the Alberta Chamber of Resources, the Sudbury Neutrino Observatory Laboratory, and the Queen's Centre for Enterprise Development.

She was inducted into the Canadian Academy of Engineering in 2004 and was on its board from 2006 to 2012. She was on the Council of Canadian Academies, has been a reviewer for the Canadian Foundation for Innovation, and has participated in national and regional Innovation Forums.

== Awards and recognition ==
In 2015, Sturgess became a Member of the Order of Canada in recognition of her achievements and community service, and received an honorary doctorate from her alma mater, Queen's University. In 2018, the University of Calgary awarded her an honorary doctorate. Earlier, in 1999, she received the Queen's University Distinguished Service Award and, in 2004, its Alumni Achievement Award.

Sturgess has been awarded the Queen Elizabeth II Platinum Jubilee Medal, the YWCA Women of Distinction Award for Science and Technology, the Queen Elizabeth II Diamond Jubilee Medal, and the Alberta Centennial Medal. She received the ASTech Outstanding Contribution to Alberta Science and Technology Community Award in 2016, and has been named in Canada's Top 100 Most Powerful Women and Women of Vision. In 2012, she was named the Outstanding Businesswoman in Calgary by the Consumers Choice Awards, and in 2021, she was listed as one of To Do Canada's 12 Inspirational Alberta Women You Should Know About. She is a member of the Young Presidents' Organization and the International Women's Forum.

In 2019, Sturgess was recognized as an Innovator by SHEInnovates in Alberta. She received the Leopold Nadeau Memorial Award for Distinguished Service from the Canadian Academy of Engineering in 2021. That same year, she was named in Foresight Canada’s Women Leading Cleantech, as well as in Pembina Institute’s Women in Energy Transformation.
