= William-Henry Gauvin =

Canadian chemical engineer (1913–1994)

- Born: March 30, 1913; Paris, France
- Died: June 6, 1994 (aged 81); Beaconsfield, Quebec
- Occupation: chemical engineer

William-Henry Gauvin CC FRSC (March 30, 1913 – June 6, 1994) was a Canadian chemical engineer. He was also an educator and championed industry-university-governmental research in Canada.

== Early life ==
William H. Gauvin was born in Paris, France, on 1913. He attended schools in Europe before moving to Montreal, Canada. He received his B.Eng. (1941), M. Eng. (1942) and Ph.D. (1945) degree from McGill University.

== Career ==
He was a professor of Chemical Engineering at McGill University. He worked as a consultant at Pulp and Paper Research Institute of Canada, Montréal from 1951 to 1957. He was a director on advanced technology at Noranda Research Center from 1982 to 1983. He was also a Scientific Advisor to Director at Institut de recherche d'Hydro-Québec from 1983 to 1990.

== Honours ==
- Fellow of the Royal Society of Canada
- Fellow of the American Institute of Chemical Engineers
- Honorary Fellow, Institution of Chemical Engineers, United Kingdom
- Honorary Fellow, Chemical Institute of Canada
- In 1975 he was made a Companion of the Order of Canada.
- In 1984 he was awarded the Government of Quebec's Prix Marie-Victorin.
- In 1986 he was awarded the Royal Society of Canada's Thomas W. Eadie Medal.

Honorary Doctorate Degrees:

- 1968 D. Eng., honoris causa, Waterloo University
- 1984 D. Sc., honoris causa, McGill University
- 1984 D. Sc., honoris causa, Queen's University
- 1986 D. Sc., honoris causa, McMaster University
