= Polytechnique Montréal =

Engineering university in Montréal, Quebec, Canada

- Seal of Polytechnique Montréal
- Other name: Poly
- Former name: École des sciences appliquées aux arts et à l'industrie
- Motto: Ut tensio sic vis
- Motto in English: As the extension, so the force
- Type: Public
- Established: 1873
- Academic affiliations: UACC, CBIE
- Endowment: CA$145 million
- President: Pierre Lassonde
- Director: Maud Cohen
- Administrative staff: 220
- Undergraduates: 4,993
- Postgraduates: 1,917
- Location: 2500, chemin de Polytechnique; Montreal, Quebec; H3T 1J4; 45°30′18″N 73°36′45″W
- Campus: Urban
- Colours: Red; Orange; Green; Blue; Black
- Website: www.polymtl.ca/en

Polytechnique Montréal (French pronunciation: [pɔlitɛknik mɔ̃ʁeal]; previously École polytechnique de Montréal [ekɔl pɔlitɛknik də mɔ̃ʁeal]) is a public research university affiliated with the Université de Montréal in Montreal, Quebec, Canada. The school offers graduate and postgraduate training, and is active in research. Following tradition, new Bachelors of Engineering (B.Eng) graduating from Polytechnique Montréal receive an Iron Ring, during the Canadian Ritual of the Calling of an Engineer ceremony.

== History ==
Polytechnique Montréal was founded in 1873 in order to teach technical drawing and other useful arts. At first, it was set in a converted residence. It later moved to a larger building on Saint-Denis street. In 1958, it moved to its current location on the Université de Montréal campus. The original building was enlarged in 1975 and then in 1989. In 2002, the Computer and Electrical Engineering Department (they were later separated) began to occupy the fifth and sixth floor of the old École des Hautes Études Commerciales de Montréal building. In 2003, the construction of three new buildings started.

Until the 1960s, the main purpose of the school was to train engineers. However, from 1959 on, the focus went to research. Nowadays, it is a leading research institution in applied sciences in Canada.

In 1976, a SLOWPOKE-2 reactor was installed at Polytechnique Montréal. The operating licence for the non-power reactor was renewed June 23, 2023, and is valid until June 30, 2033. The reactor has been in operation since 1976 and is not expected to operate beyond 2040. It is used for research, teaching, neutron generation and isotope production.

=== 1989 massacre ===
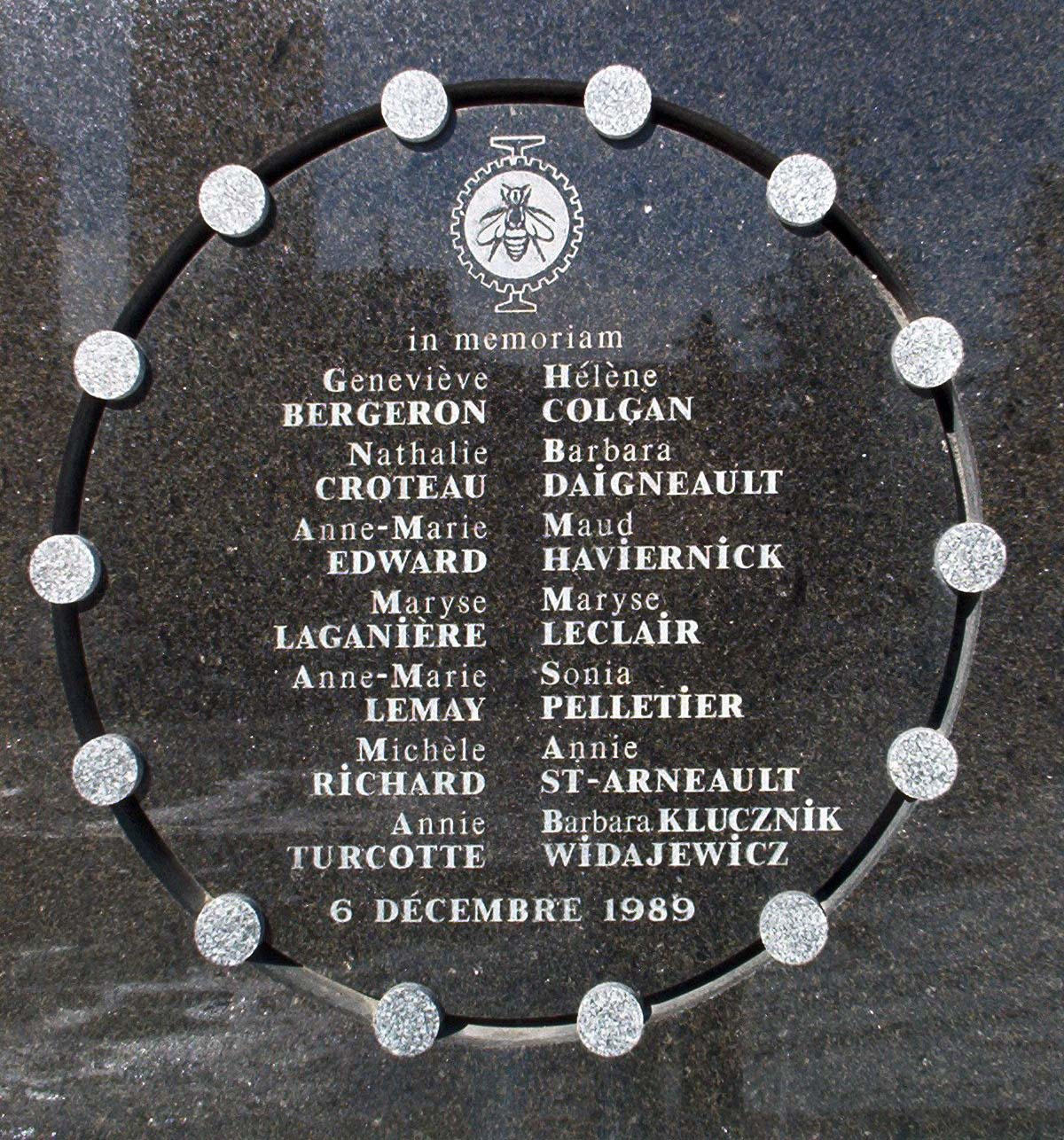
Plaque commemorating the murder of 14 female students (December 6, 1989)

On December 6, 1989, 25-year-old Canadian Marc Lépine entered the campus of Polytechnique Montréal and fatally shot 14 women, wounding 10 other women and four men before killing himself on campus. For more than 30 years, the massacre was the deadliest shooting incident in modern Canadian history, until April 2020, when a gunman killed 22 people in the Nova Scotia rampage.

The Polytechnique massacre is commemorated by the Canadian government as the National Day of Remembrance and Action on Violence Against Women.

== Campus ==
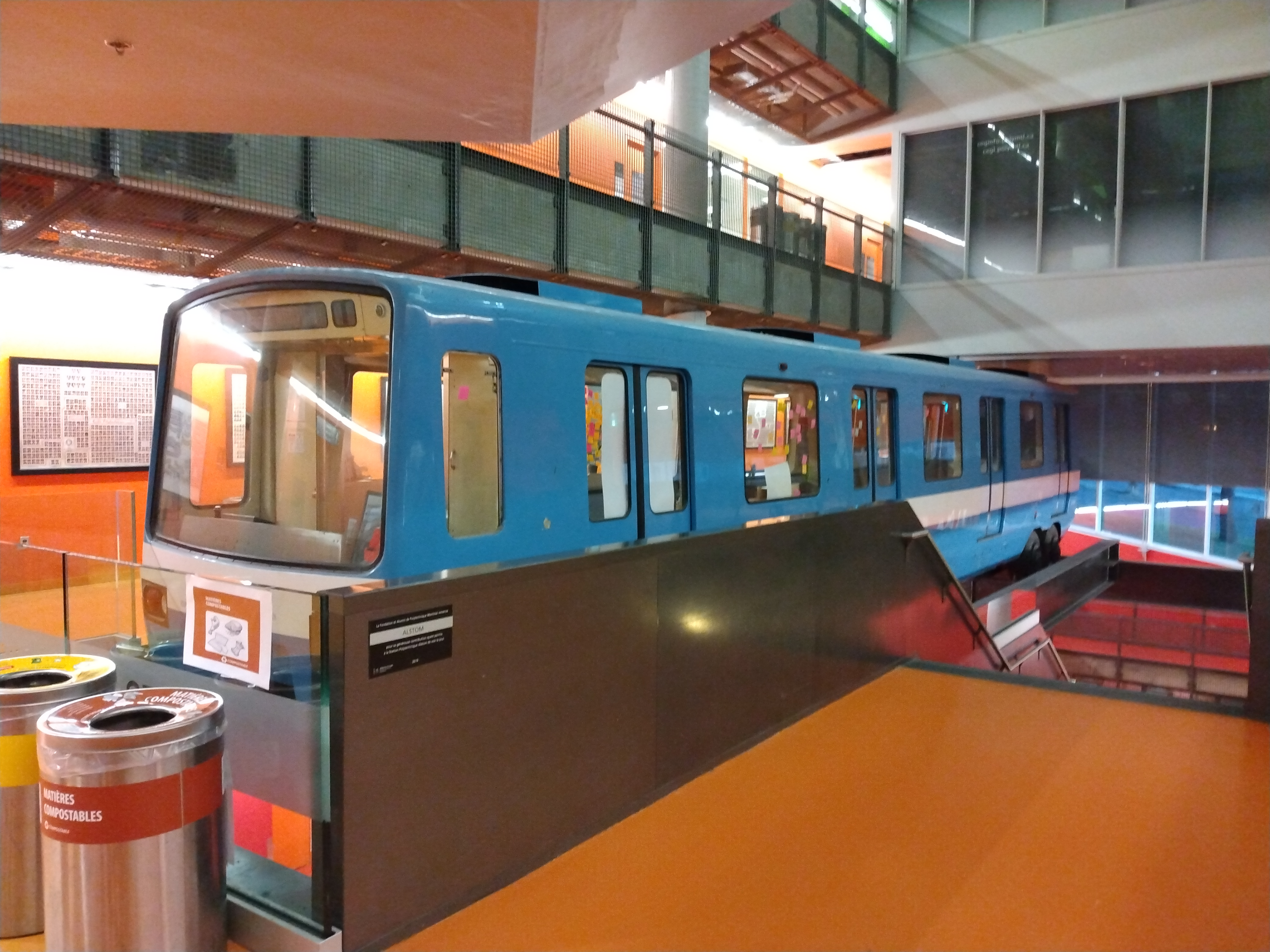
Montreal Metro train on display at Polytechnique

The school's campus is located on the northern face of Mount Royal. Its main building is the highest building on the main campus of the Université de Montréal. The J.-Armand-Bombardier building sits beside the main building and mainly serves for research activities and as an emergence centre for spin-off companies, designed to support the pre-startup of technology-based businesses. The building is named for Joseph-Armand Bombardier, the inventor of the snowmobile.

The Pierre-Lassonde et Claudette MacKay-Lassonde building, home to the Electrical Engineering Department and Computer and Software Engineering Department, was inaugurated in September 2005. This new building won an "Award of Merit" from Canadian Architect magazine in 2003, received a Gold certification from the U.S. Green Building Council and scored 46 on the LEED points scale which was, at inauguration, the highest score ever obtained in Canada. The energy performance of the Lassonde buildings is 60% better than the standard set by the Model National Energy Code of Canada for Buildings.

== Organization ==
Polytechnique is one of the three largest engineering schools in Canada, and the largest one in the province of Quebec. Since its foundation in 1873, this French language educational establishment trains engineers and specialists. The school contributes to the scientific and economic expansion of the region. Its graduates were part of most of Quebec's major engineering works of the 20th century such as the construction of hydroelectric dams. Polytechnique Montréal is in the forefront of engineering in many fields such as aeronautics, computer engineering, telecommunications, biotechnology, nanotechnology, environmental science, artificial intelligence, and many other high-end domains.

Polytechnique offers 12 undergraduate programs, managed by seven departments. Students can choose to specialize in the following disciplines:

- Chemical Engineering Department
  - Chemical Engineering
- Civil, geological, mining Engineering Department
  - Civil Engineering
  - Geological Engineering
  - Mining Engineering
- Electrical Engineering Department
  - Biomedical Engineering
  - Electrical Engineering
- Computer and Software Engineering Department
  - Computer Engineering
  - Software Engineering
- Mathematics and Industrial Engineering Department
  - Industrial Engineering
- Mechanical Engineering Department
  - Aerospace Engineering
  - Mechanical Engineering
- Engineering Physics Department
  - Engineering Physics
  - Nuclear Engineering
- Biomedical Engineering Institute

== Research ==
Polytechnique is known for its dynamic research, which represented over 40 percent of its budget for the year 2008–2009 (60.5 million CAD research funding). Among the engineering faculties/schools in the U15, Polytechnique Montréal leads the way in many areas of research: number of Canada Research Chairs (No. 1), total NSERC grants (No. 1), number of publications in engineering faculties in Canada (No. 5) and NSERC research grants in partnership with industry (No.1). Forty research units receive more than 20 percent of the funding and contracts for research in the area of applied science given to Quebec's universities.

== Students and faculty ==
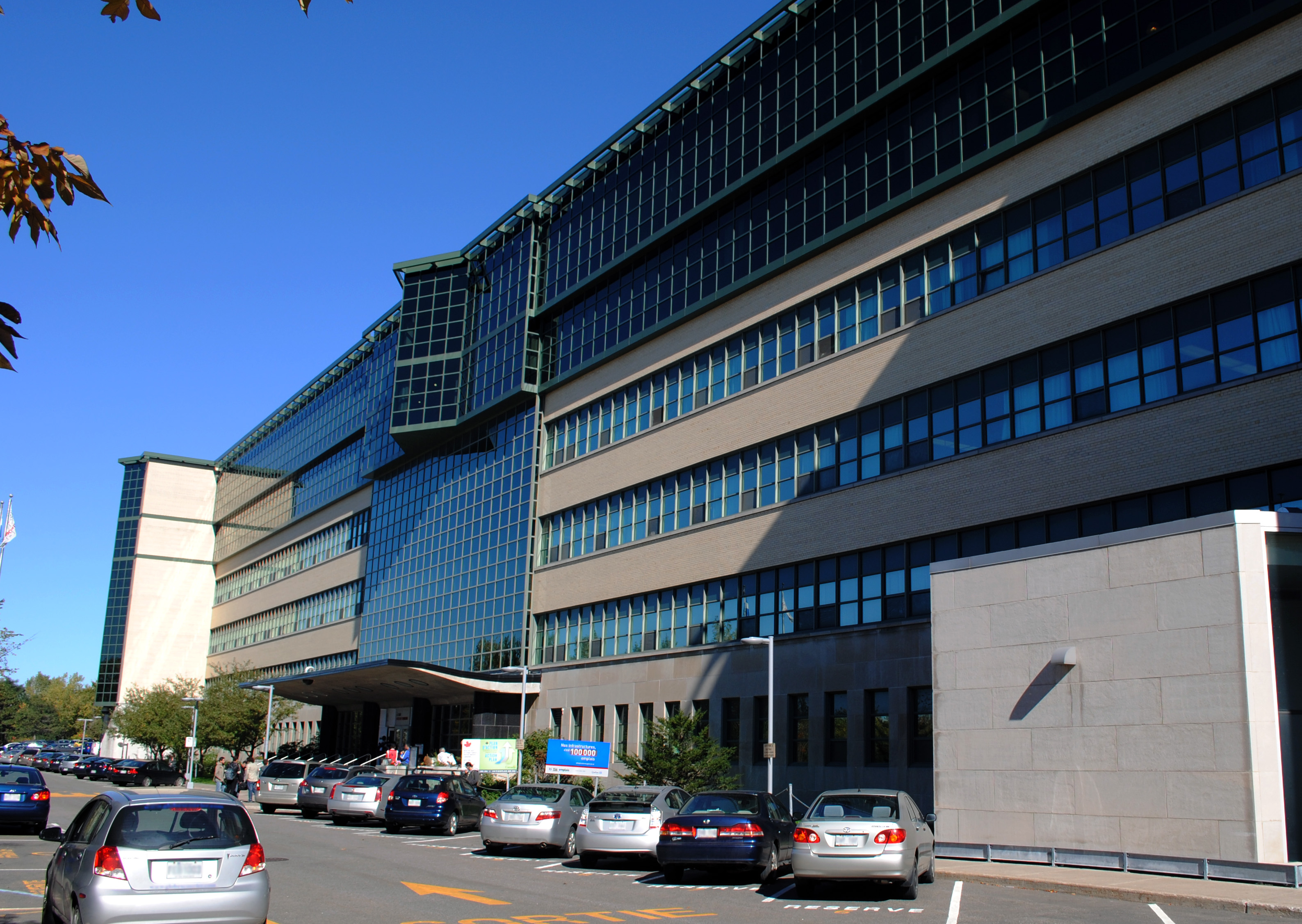
Main building - Polytechnique Montréal

Enrolment for 2007 was 3,929 undergraduate and 1,615 graduate students. During the 2003 winter semester there were 5713 students enrolled, of them, 1198 were women and 4515 were men. There were 3997 undergraduates and 1716 graduate students.

220 teachers and 150 researchers are part of the school's community. Approximately 600 diplomas, 200 masters, and 50 doctorates are awarded each year.

== Notable alumni ==
- Jean-Jacques Archambault, Hydro-Québec engineer who pioneered 735 kV electric transmission lines.
- Micheline Bouchard, former Hydro-Québec engineer
- Pierre Dufour, Senior Executive Vice-president of Air Liquide
- Marc Grégoire, Commissioner of the Canadian Coast Guard
- Bernard Lamarre, civil engineer and former CEO of Lavalin and later President of Polytechnique Montréal
- Pierre Lassonde, businessman and philanthropist
- Marc Parent, CEO of CAE Inc.
- Fernand Préfontaine, architect and co-founder of the arts journal Le Nigog
- David Saint-Jacques, Canadian astronaut
- Paul-Aimé Sauriol, civil engineer and founder of Dessau
- Michèle Thibodeau-DeGuire, civil engineer, CEO of Centraide Montreal (1991–2012), Chair of Polytechnique Montréal (2013–2020)
- Thierry Vandal, former president and CEO of Hydro-Québec

Former students who have not completed their studies include:

- Christian Lépine, tenth bishop and eighth archbishop of Montreal
- Justin Trudeau, former Prime Minister of Canada

== Student life ==
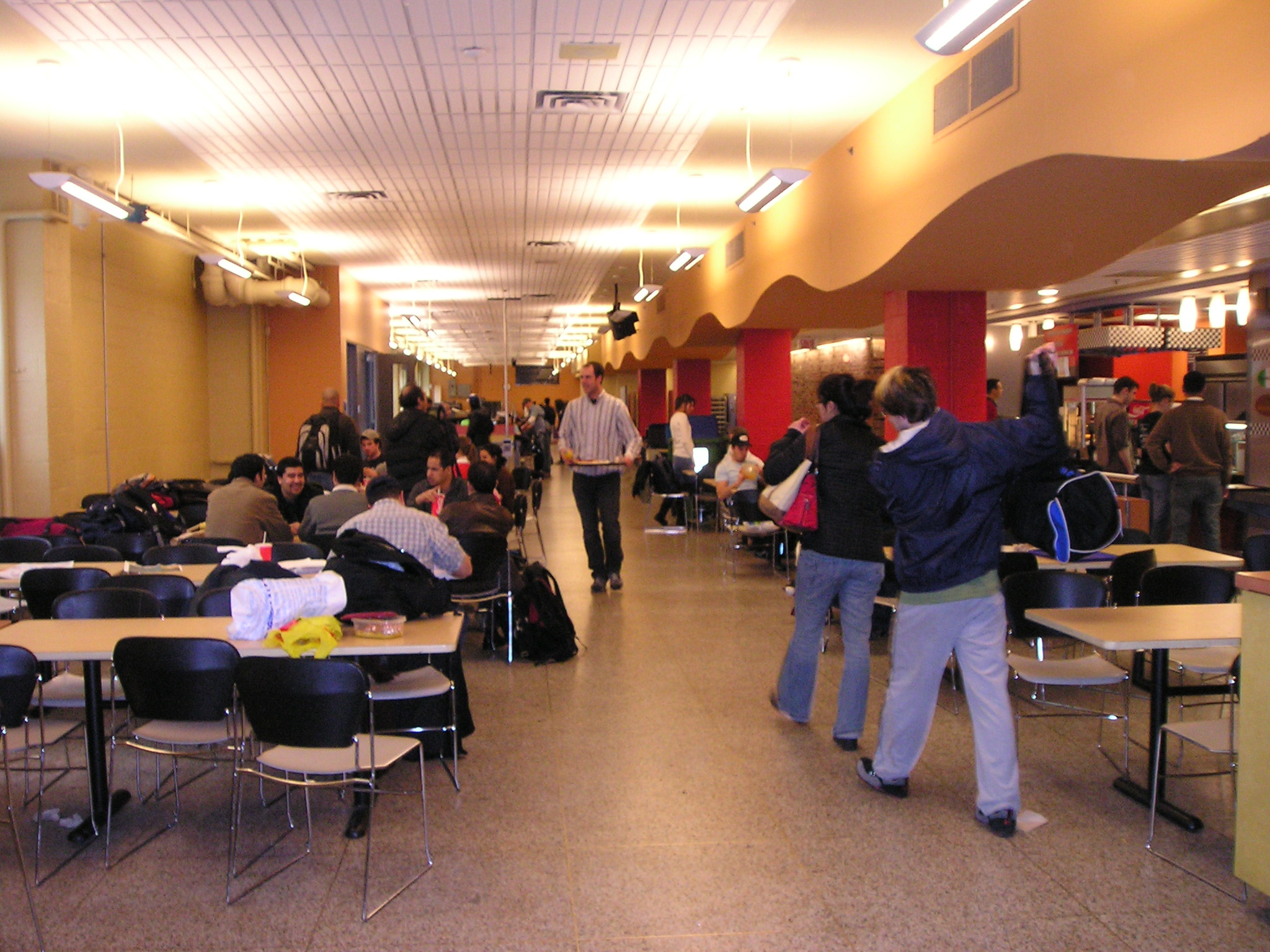
Cafeteria at Polytechnique Montréal

The school is well known for its student life, including its theatre group Poly-Théâtre and photo club (in French) Poly-Photo. Many other groups are present, such as Allo-Poly (humor), Poly-TV, Polyrad, etc. The student newspaper, (in French) Le Polyscope was founded in 1967. It publishes weekly during the Quebec school year. It is known around the campus of the Université de Montréal for its irreverent humour, crosswords puzzles, Arts & Entertainment section, and "you submit it, we'll publish it" policy.

Polytechnique is also home to various extracurricular technical societies. These student organizations are practical projects aiming to design various technological devices, and include:

- PolyCyber, cybersecurity club;
- Archimède, human-powered submarine;
- Avion Cargo, remote controlled cargo plane;
- Canoe de béton, canoe exclusively made of concrete;
- Élikos, automated drone;
- PolySTAR, Robotics Workshops/RoboMaster Competition/Robotics Mentoring;
- Esteban, solar-powered electric car;
- Formule Électrique, electric race car;
- Formule SAE;
- La Machine EPM;
- Mini-Baja, dune buggy;
- Polybroue, beer brewing;
- Poly Games, video games development;
- Polyproject, various high technology electronic devices;
- PolyCortex, neurotechnologies;
- Pont d'acier, small scale steel bridge;
- Oronos, small scale rocket;
- SAE Robotique;
- Smart Bird;
- PolyOrbite, small scale satellite;

Polytechnique is famous around Montreal for its beach party, organised by a delegation of students known as Poly-Party. It takes place once every two years during winter (generally in January). Students build a complete "artificial beach" in the cafeteria, by putting loads of sand on the floor and assembling an interior water park with a large swimming pool.

Also, each year, the Poly-World student delegation goes to another country to learn and compare foreign engineering practices. This extracurricular activity helps participating students learn different cultural visions and helps them appreciate the different factors of global competitiveness in the engineering field.

== See also ==
- Higher education in Quebec
- List of universities in Quebec
- Canadian Interuniversity Sport
- Canadian government scientific research organizations
- Canadian university scientific research organizations
- Canadian industrial research and development organizations
