= Kathleen E. Sendall =

Canadian engineer

Kathleen Sendall is a Canadian engineer. In 2005, she served as president of the Canadian Academy of Engineering. Throughout her career, which began in Alberta's oil and gas industry, she has held technical and executive positions and has actively promoted the participation of women in the profession of engineering. She is a member of the Order of Canada.

== Education ==
Sendall graduated from Queen's University in mechanical engineering in 1977 and attended the Ivey School of Business’s executive program at Western University in 1990.

== Career ==
Sendall worked for 30 years at Petro-Canada. She retired in 2009 as senior vice president responsible for the natural gas business unit, after 30 years of full-time employment with the company. She serves on the board of CGG (formally Compagnie Générale de Géophysique) and the Enmax Energy Corporation of Calgary. She is former chair of the Board of Emissions Reduction Alberta. She served on two federal advisory councils, for sustainable development and gender equity on boards and as Governor and the first woman Board Chair of the Canadian Association of Petroleum Producers.

Sendall is a former Chair of the Calgary Chapter of the International Women's Forum. She continues to serve as a Trustee of the Ernest C. Foundation Awards Foundation, as Vice-Chair of Alberta Innovates, and on Calgary's Advisory Council for Promoting Women on Boards. She has also been a director of Calgary Opera.

Before becoming president of the Canadian Academy of Engineering, into which she was inducted in 1999, she served on its Board as a director and as Chair of the Assessment Panel of the Canadian Council of Academies on the State of Industrial R&D. She is a former member of APEGGA and the Society of Petroleum Engineers.

== Awards and recognition ==
In 2011, Sendall was named a Member of the Order of Canada and in 2012 was awarded the Queen's Diamond Jubilee Medal.

Her other honours include the YWCA Women of Distinction Award. She has been named four times as one of Canada's top Most Powerful Women Corporate Executives, twice as one of Alberta's 50 Most Powerful People, has been inducted into the Most Powerful Women Hall of Fame, and has received the 50 Key Women in Energy Global Award, and had been honoured by the International Women's Forum. She has received an APEGGA Community Service Award and, in 2005, a Canadian Engineering Leader Award.

Sendall has received an honorary Doctor of Laws degree from the University of Calgary, and an honorary Bachelor of Applied Industrial Ecology degree from Mount Royal College. She is a former member of the Board of Governors of the University of Calgary. For the 2014-2015 year, she was named the Jarislowsky Fellow in business management at Calgary's Haskayne School of Business.
