= Université de Montréal =

University in Quebec, Canada

- University of Montreal (English)
- Latin: Universitas Montis Regii
- Former name: Université Laval à Montréal
- Motto: Fide splendet et scientia (Latin)
- Motto in English: It shines by faith and knowledge
- Type: Public
- Established: 1878; 148 years ago
- Academic affiliations: AUF, IFPU, Universities Canada, U15
- Endowment: CA$403.054 million
- Budget: CA$886.1 million
- Chancellor: Frantz Saintellemy
- Rector: Daniel Jutras
- Faculty: 7,329
- Administrative staff: 4,427
- Students: 66,972 total (44,106 without its affiliated schools)
- Undergraduates: 34,335
- Postgraduates: 11,925
- Location: Montreal, Quebec, Canada (Note: The university's main campus and administration is based at 2900, boulevard Édouard-Montpetit, Montreal, Quebec. In addition to the campus on boulevard Édouard-Montpetit, the institution also operates several other campuses in Montreal, Laval, Lanaudière, Longueuil, and Saint-Hyacinthe.); 45°30′15″N 73°36′51″W
- Campus: Urban, park, 60 ha (150 acres)
- Language: French
- Newspaper: Quartier Libre
- Colours: Royal blue, white and black
- Nickname: Carabins
- Sporting affiliations: U Sports, QSSF
- Mascot: Carabin
- Website: umontreal.ca

The Université de Montréal (English: University of Montreal; UdeM; French pronunciation: [ynivɛʁsite də mɔ̃ʁeal]) (Note: As with most francophone post-secondary institutions in Quebec, the university does not have an official name in English, with the institution using the name Université de Montréal to refer to itself in both languages. However, several publications have used the name University of Montreal to refer to the institution.) is a French-language public research university in Montreal, Quebec, Canada. The university's main campus is located in the Côte-des-Neiges neighborhood of Côte-des-Neiges–Notre-Dame-de-Grâce on Mount Royal near the Outremont Summit (also called Mount Murray), in the borough of Outremont. The institution comprises thirteen faculties, more than sixty departments and two affiliated schools: Polytechnique Montréal (School of Engineering; formerly the École polytechnique de Montréal) and HEC Montréal (School of Business; formerly the École des Hautes études commerciales). It offers more than 650 undergraduate programmes and graduate programmes, including 71 doctoral programmes.

The university was founded as a satellite campus of Université Laval in 1878. It became an independent institution after it was issued a papal charter in 1919 and a provincial charter in 1920. The Université de Montréal moved from Montreal's Quartier Latin to its present location on Mount Royal in 1942. It was made a secular institution with the passing of another provincial charter in 1967.

The school is co-educational, and has 34,335 undergraduate and 11,925 post-graduate students (excluding affiliated schools). Alumni and former students reside across Canada and around the world, with notable alumni serving as government officials, academics and business leaders.

== History ==
The Université de Montréal was founded in 1878 as a branch campus of Université Laval in Quebec City. It was then known as Université Laval à Montréal. The move initially went against the wishes of the Bishop of Montréal, Édouard-Charles Fabre, who advocated an independent university in his city. Certain parts of the institution's educational facilities, such as those of the Séminaire de Québec and the Faculty of Medicine (founded as the Montreal School of Medicine and Surgery), had already been established in Montréal in 1876 and 1843, respectively.

The Vatican granted the university some administrative autonomy in 1889, thus allowing it to choose its own professors and license its own diplomas. However, it was not until 8 May 1919 that a papal charter from Pope Benedict XV granted full autonomy to the university. It thus became an independent Catholic university under its current name, Université de Montréal. The Université de Montréal was granted its first provincial charter on 14 February 1920.

At the time of its creation, fewer than a hundred students were admitted to the university's three faculties, which at that time were located in Old Montreal. These were the Faculty of Theology (located at the Grand séminaire de Montréal), the Faculty of Law (hosted by the Society of Saint-Sulpice) and the Faculty of Medicine (at the Château Ramezay).

Graduate training based on German-inspired American models of specialized coursework and completion of a research thesis was introduced and adopted. Most of Québec's secondary education establishments employed classic course methods of varying quality. This forced the university to open a preparatory school in 1887 to harmonize the education level of its students. Named the Faculty of Arts, this school would remain in use until 1972 and was the predecessor of Québec's current CEGEP system.

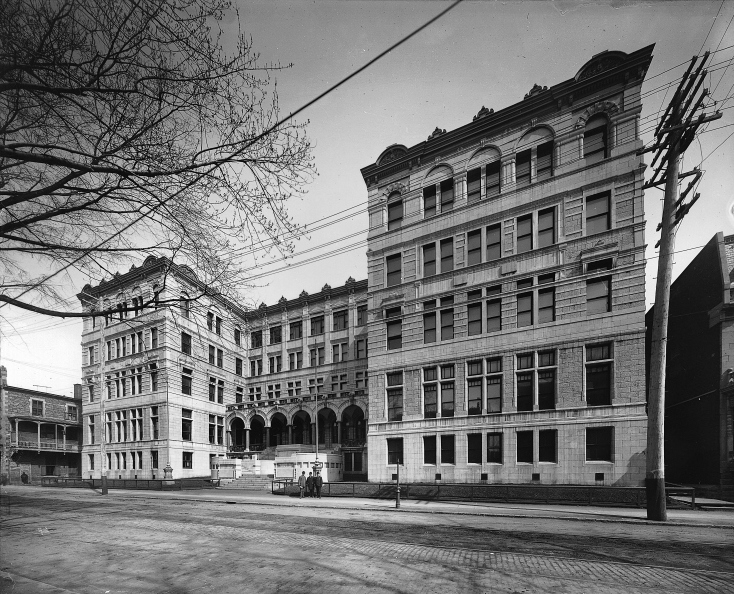
The former main building of the university from 1895 to 1942. The building is located in Montreal's Quartier Latin.

Two distinct schools eventually became affiliated to the university. The first was Polytechnique Montréal, an engineering school, which was founded in 1873 and became affiliated in 1887. The second was HEC Montréal, a business school, which was founded in 1907 and became affiliated to the university in 1915. In 1907, the Université de Montréal opened the first francophone school of architecture in Canada at Polytechnique Montréal.

Between 1920 and 1925, seven new faculties were created: Philosophy, Literature, Science, Veterinary Medicine, Dental Surgery, Pharmacy and Social Sciences. Notably, the Faculty of Social Sciences was founded in 1920 by Édouard Montpetit, the first laic to lead a faculty. He thereafter was named secretary-general, a role he fulfilled until 1950.

From 1876 to 1895, most classes took place in the Grand séminaire de Montréal. From 1895 to 1942, the university was housed in a building at the intersection of Saint-Denis and Sainte-Catherine streets in Montreal's eastern downtown Quartier Latin. Unlike English-language universities in Montréal, such as McGill University, the Université de Montréal suffered a lack of funding for two major reasons: the relative poverty of the French Canadian population and the complications ensuing from its being managed remotely, from Quebec City. The downtown campus was hit by three different fires between 1919 and 1921, further complicating the university's already precarious finances and forcing it to spend much of its resources on repairing its own infrastructure.

By 1930, enough funds had been accumulated to start the construction of a new campus on the northwest slope of Mount Royal, adopting new plans designed by Ernest Cormier. However, the financial crisis of the 1930s virtually suspended all ongoing construction. Many speculated that the university would have to sell its unfinished building projects to ensure its own survival. Not until 1939 did the provincial government directly intervene by injecting public funds.

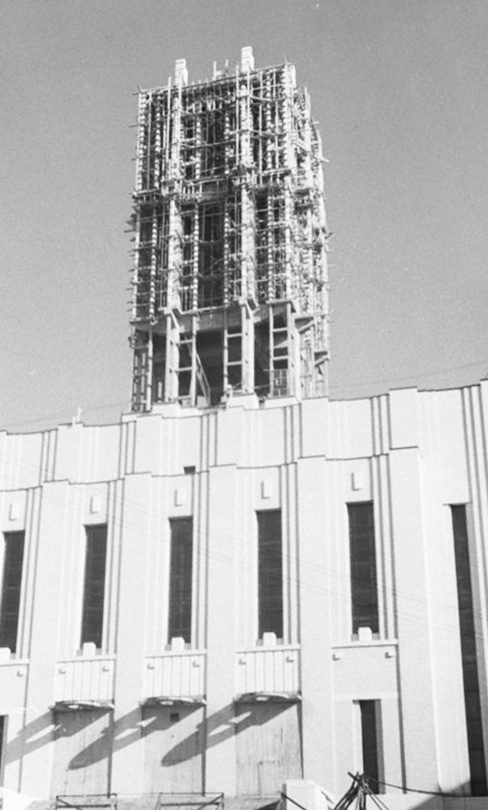
Construction of Pavilion Roger-Gaudry in 1941. The Mount Royal campus was inaugurated in 1943.

The campus's construction subsequently resumed and the mountain campus was officially inaugurated on 3 June 1943. The Côte-des-Neiges site includes property expropriated from a residential development along Decelles Avenue, known as Northmount Heights. The university's former downtown facilities would later serve as Montreal's second francophone university, the Université du Québec à Montréal.

In 1943, the university assisted the Western Allies by providing laboratory accommodations on its campus. Scientists there worked to develop a nuclear reactor, notably by conducting various heavy water experiments. The research was part of the larger Manhattan Project, which aimed to develop the first atomic bomb. Scientists working on the school's campus eventually produced the first atomic battery to work outside of the United States. One of the participating Québec scientists, Pierre Demers, also discovered a series of radioactive elements issued from Neptunium.

The Université de Montréal was issued its second provincial charter in 1950. A new government policy of higher education during the 1960s (following the Quiet Revolution) came in response to popular pressure and the belief that higher education was key to social justice and economic productivity. The policy led to the school's third provincial charter, which was passed in 1967. It defined the Université de Montréal as a public institution, dedicated to higher learning and research, with students and teachers having the right to participate in the school's administration.

In 1965, the appointment of the university's first secular rector, Roger Gaudry, paved the way for modernization. The university established its first adult-education degree program offered by a French Canadian university in 1968. That year, the Lionel-Groulx and 3200 Jean-Brillant buildings were inaugurated, the former being named after Quebec nationalist Lionel Groulx. The following year, the Louis Collin parking garage—which won a Governor General's medal for its architecture in 1970—was erected.

An important event that marked the university's history was the École Polytechnique massacre. On 6 December 1989, a gunman armed with a rifle entered the École Polytechnique building, killing 14 people, all of whom were women, before taking his own life.

The Faculty of Theology was closed and transferred to the Institute of Religious Studies in the Faculty of Arts and Science in 2016.

Since 2002, the university has embarked on its largest construction project since the late 1960s, with the construction of five new buildings planned for advanced research in pharmacology, engineering, aerospace, cancer studies and biotechnology.

== Campus ==
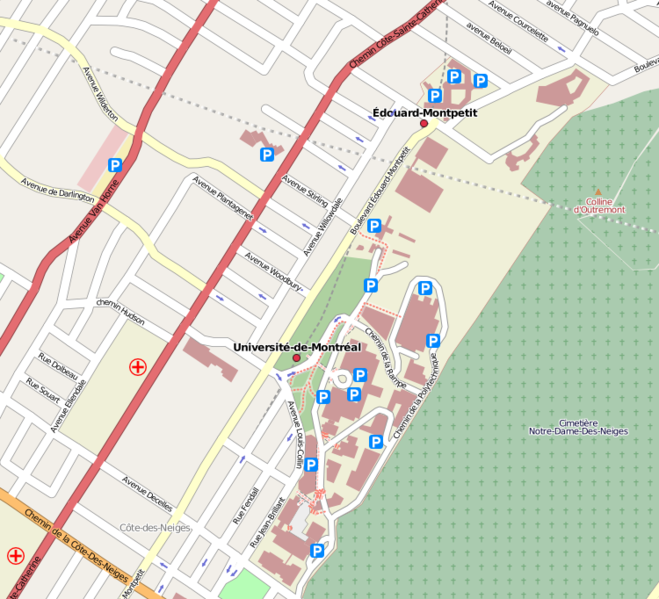
Map of the university's Mount Royal campus

The university's main campus is located on the northern slope of Mount Royal in the Outremont and Côte-des-Neiges boroughs. Its landmark Pavilion Roger-Gaudry (named for former rector Roger Gaudry)—known until 2003 as Pavillon principal—can be seen from around the campus and is known for its imposing tower. It is built mainly in the Art Deco style with some elements of International style and was designed by noted architect Ernest Cormier. On 14 September 1954, a Roll of Honour plaque on the wall at the right of the stairs to the Court of Honour in Roger-Gaudry Pavillon was dedicated to alumni of the school who died in while in the Canadian military during the Second World War. In November 1963, a memorial plaque was dedicated to the memory of those members of the Université de Montréal who served in the Armed Forces during the First and Second World Wars and Korea. The Mont-Royal campus is served by the Côte-des-Neiges, Université-de-Montréal, and Édouard-Montpetit metro stations.

The J.-Armand-Bombardier Incubator is among buildings jointly erected by the Université de Montréal and Polytechnique Montréal. The incubator is part on the main campus of Université de Montréal and was built in the fall of 2004 with the aim of helping R&D-intensive startup companies by providing complete infrastructures at advantageous conditions. The environment helps promote collaboration between industries and academics while encouraging Quebec entrepreneurship. Since its creation the Incubator has hosted more than fifteen companies, mainly in the biomedical field, in the field of polymer/surface treatment, in optics/photonics (like Photon etc.) and in IT security (like ESET).

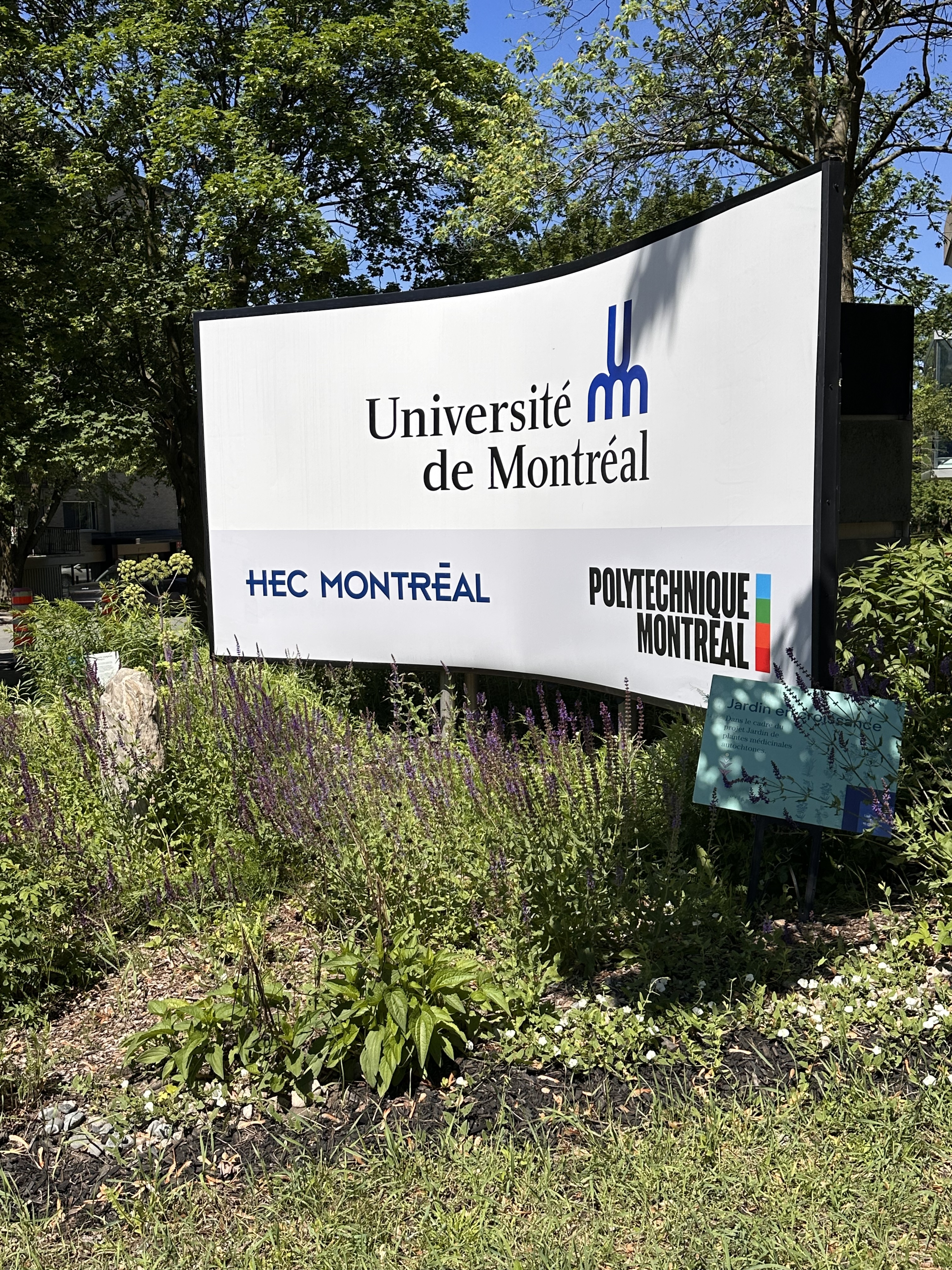

The Centre hospitalier de l'Université de Montréal (CHUM) and the Centre hospitalier universitaire Sainte-Justine are the two teaching hospital networks of the Université de Montréal's Faculty of Medicine, although the latter is also affiliated with other medical institutions such as the Institut universitaire de gériatrie de Montréal, Montreal Heart Institute, Hôpital Sacré-Coeur and Hôpital Maisonneuve-Rosemont. A plaque dedicated to the personnel of the "Hôpital Général Canadien No. 6 (Université Laval de Montréal)" from 1916 to 1920 was donated by Mr. Louis de Gonzague Beaubien in 1939.

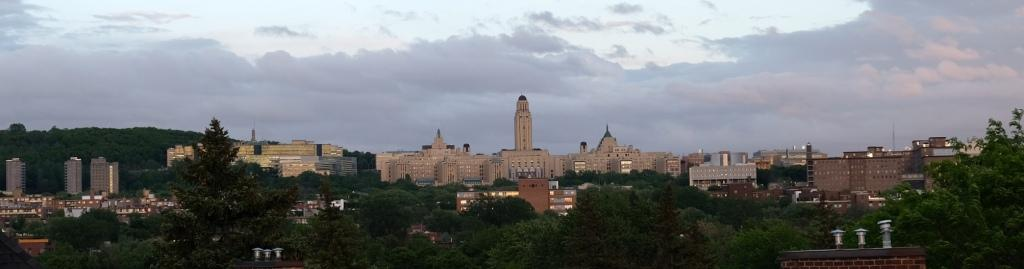
View of Université de Montréal's main campus, taken in June 2017. The majority of the university's facilities are located on this campus.

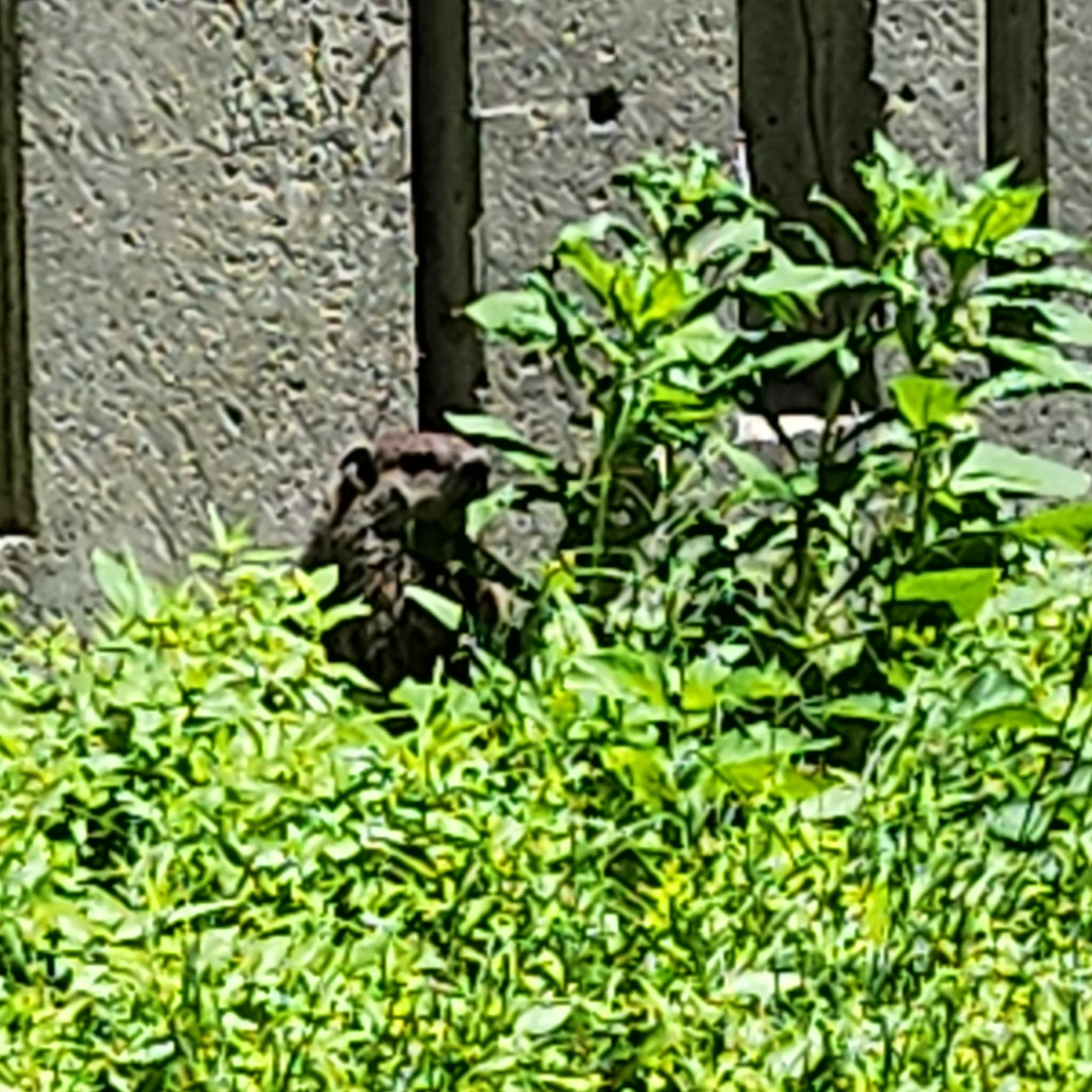
A groundhog on the main campus of the University of Montreal.

Partly wooded and situated close to areas of green space, the University of Montreal’s main campus is also known for being a habitat for a variety of wildlife, including groundhogs.

=== Off-campus facilities ===
Apart from its main Mont-Royal campus, the university also maintains five regional facilities in Terrebonne, Laval, Longueuil, Saint-Hyacinthe and Mauricie. The campus in Laval, just north of Montréal, was opened in 2006. It is Laval's first university campus and is located in the area near the Montmorency metro station and opposite to Collège Montmorency. In October 2009, the university announced an expansion of its Laval satellite campus with the commissioning of the six-storey Cité du Savoir complex. The Mauricie campus in the city of Trois-Rivières is known for its association with the Université du Québec à Trois-Rivières (UQTR) and as a satellite campus for the university's faculty of medicine. To solve the problem of lack of space on its main campus, the university is also planning to open a new campus in Outremont, known as the MIL campus.

==== Campus MIL ====
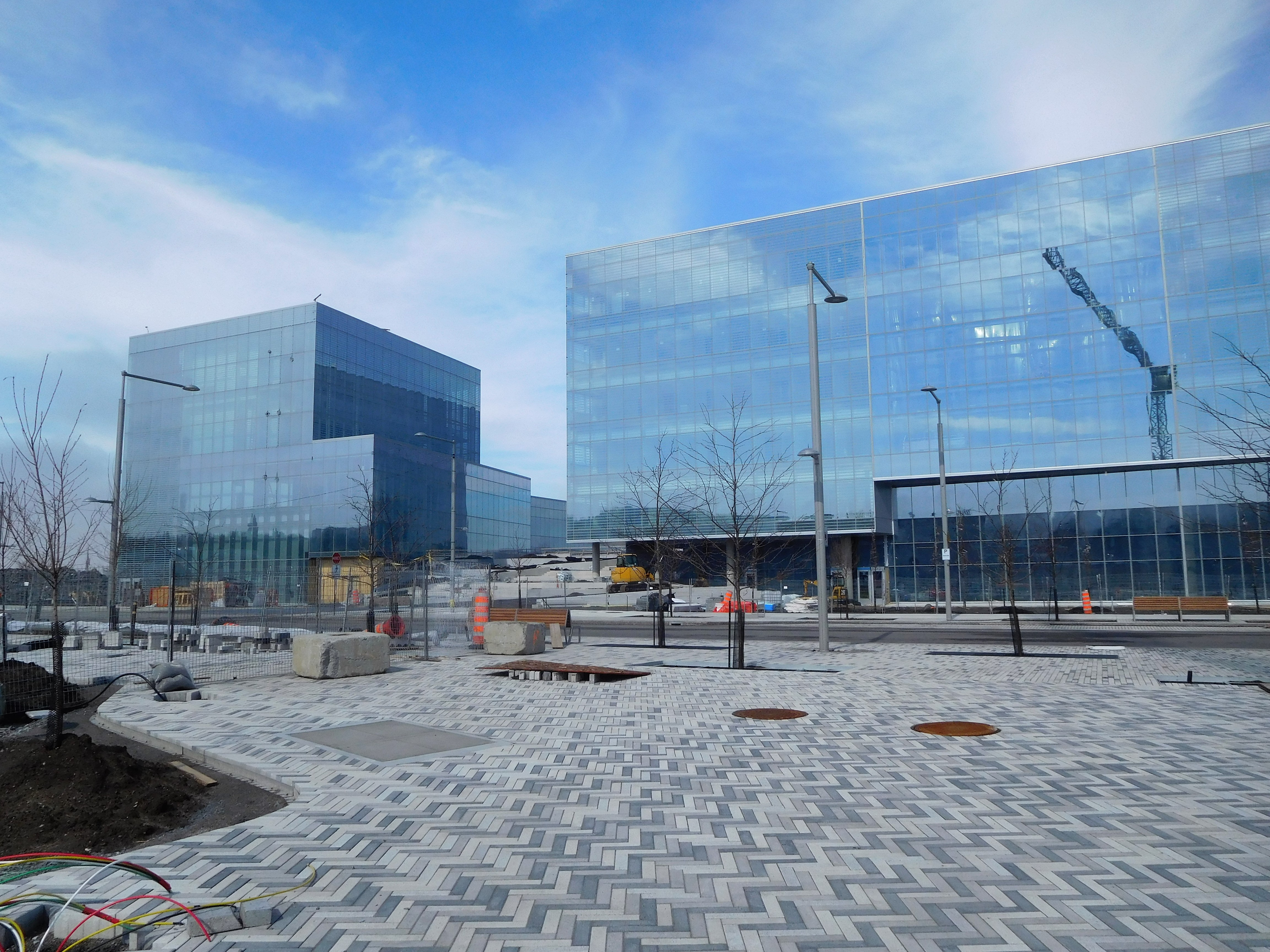
The science building at Campus MIL, while it is still under construction in April 2019

The university's master plan includes the construction of new institutional spaces in the borough of Outremont, Montreal. The campus accessible by two metro stations (Outremont and Acadie), will include teaching and research rooms. The premises are built in accordance with LEED eco-certification. The MIL campus (which derives its name from "Milieu", which means middle in French) has been under construction since 2016. At the centre of the campus lies the Science Complex, which opened in 2019.

The opening of the MIL Campus generated controversy and attracted criticism from various community organizations in Parc-Extension, one of the poorest boroughs in Montreal. In the fall of 2019, the opening of the campus was disrupted by the Parc-Extension Action Committee (CAPE) to denounce the increasing number of tenants who are evicted from their apartments to make more units available for students in the borough. More recently, these organizations claimed that the arrival of the campus has encouraged a significant increase in evictions and rental prices in Parc-Extension. Researchers from three Montreal universities – McGill University, Concordia University and Université du Quebec à Montreal – implemented the Parc-Extension anti-eviction mapping project in 2019, in collaboration with CAPE. A report documenting the gentrification of Parc-Extension was published in June 2020 by the Parc-Extension anti-eviction mapping project and the CAPE. The authors conclude that the average rent for two-bedroom apartment ads between February and May 2020 was almost twice the estimates made by the Canada Mortgage and Housing Corporation in October 2019. Organizations have also criticized the Université de Montréal for excluding the construction of student residences from the master plan of the new campus.

== Academics ==
The Université de Montréal is a publicly funded research university and a member of the Association of Universities and Colleges of Canada. Undergraduate students make up the majority of the university community, accounting for 74 per cent of the university student body, whereas graduate students account for 24 per cent of the student body. The university presently has 66,768 students (including students from affiliated institutions HEC Montréal and Polytechnique Montréal). More than 9,500 university students are international students, while another 8,000 are considered permanent residents of Canada. From the 1 June 2010 to the 31 May 2011, the university conferred 7,012 bachelor's degrees, 461 doctoral degrees, and 3,893 master's degrees.

Depending on a student's citizenship, they may be eligible for financial assistance from the Student Financial Assistance program, administered by the provincial Ministry of Education, Recreation and Sports, and/or the Canada Student Loans and Grants through the federal and provincial governments. The university's Office of Financial Aid acts as intermediaries between the students and the Quebec government for all matters relating to financial assistance programs. The financial aid provided may come in the form of loans, grants, bursaries, scholarships fellowships and work programs.

=== Rankings and reputation ===
University rankings

World rankings
- ARWU World: 151–200
- QS World: 168
- THE World: 125
- THE Employability: 72
- USNWR World: 174
- 6–8

Canadian rankings
- QS National: 7
- THE National: 6
- USNWR National: 6
- Maclean's Medical/Doctoral: 9
- Maclean's Reputation: 6

The Université de Montréal has consistently been ranked in a number of university rankings. In the 2022 Academic Ranking of World Universities, the university ranked 101–150 in the world and sixth in Canada. The 2023 QS World University Rankings ranked the university 116th in the world and fifth in Canada. The 2023 Times Higher Education World University Rankings placed the university 111th in the world, and fifth in Canada. In U.S. News & World Report 2022–23 global university rankings, the university placed 156th in its world rankings, and sixth in Canada. In Maclean's 2023 Canadian university rankings, the university was ranked 10th in their Medical-Doctoral university category. The university was ranked in spite of having opted out from participation in Maclean's graduate survey since 2006.

The Université de Montréal also placed in a number of rankings that evaluated the employment prospects of graduates. In QS's 2022 graduate employability ranking, the university ranked 191–200 in the world, and eighth in Canada. In the Times Higher Education's 2022 global employability ranking, the university's graduate business school, HEC Montréal, placed 63rd in the world, and fourth in Canada.

=== Research ===
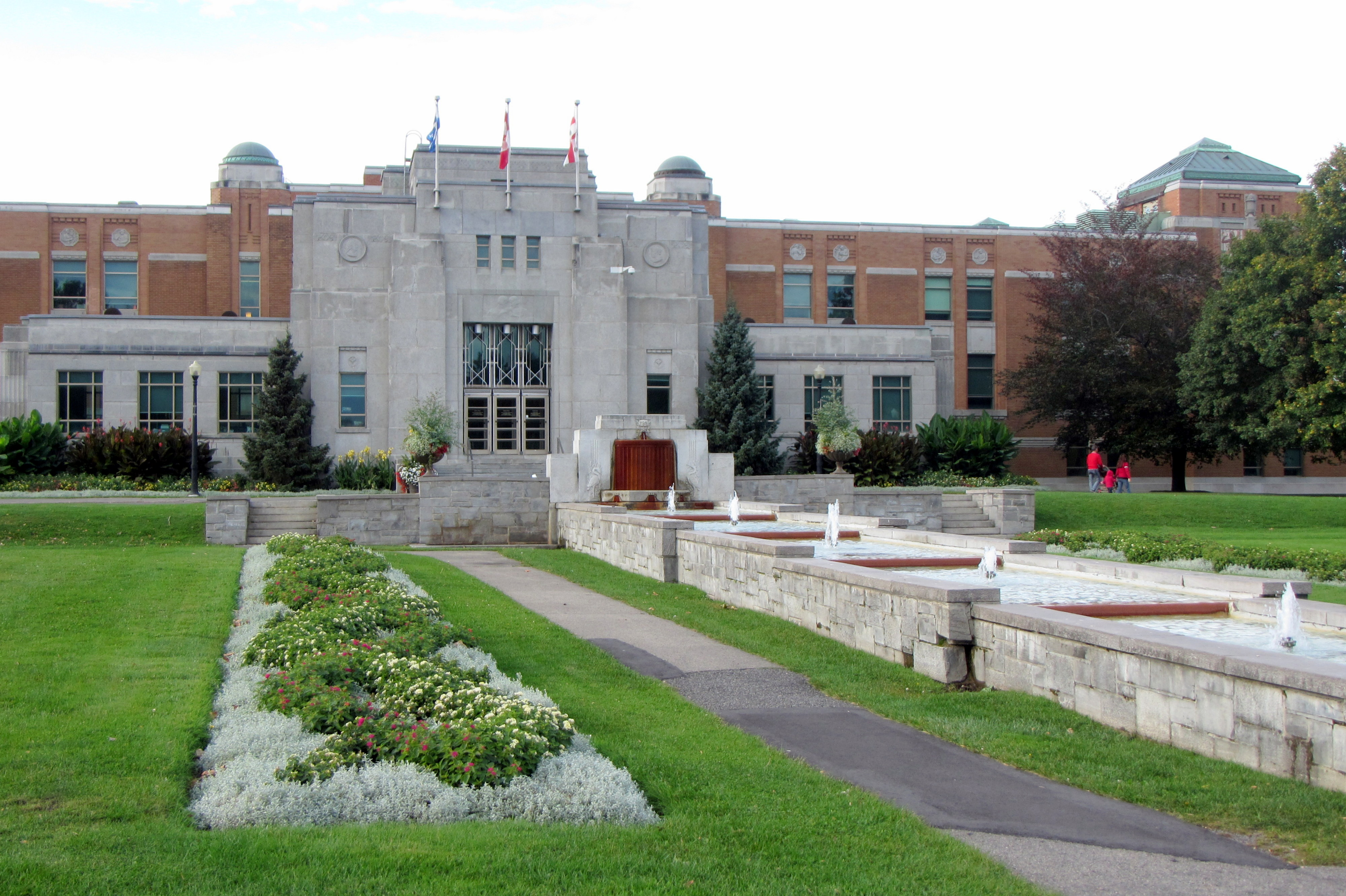
4101 Sherbrooke Street houses the university's Plant Biology Research Institute.

The Université de Montréal is a member of the U15, a group that represents 15 Canadian research universities. The university includes 465 research units and departments. In 2018, Research Infosource ranked the university third in their list of top 50 research universities, with a sponsored research income (external sources of funding) of $536.238 million in 2017. In the same year, the university's faculty averaged a sponsored research income of $271,000, while its graduates averaged a sponsored research income of $33,900.

The research performance of the Université de Montréal has been noted in several bibliometric university rankings, which use citation analysis to evaluate the impact a university has on academic publications. In 2019, the Performance Ranking of Scientific Papers for World Universities ranked the university 104th in the world, and fifth in Canada. The University Ranking by Academic Performance 2018–19 rankings placed the university 99th in the world, and fifth in Canada.

Since 2017, the Université de Montréal has partnered with McGill University on Mila, a research institute and community of professors, students, industrial partners and startups working in AI; with over 500 researchers, the institute is the world's largest academic research center for deep learning. The institute was originally founded in 1993 by Professor Yoshua Bengio.

== Student life ==
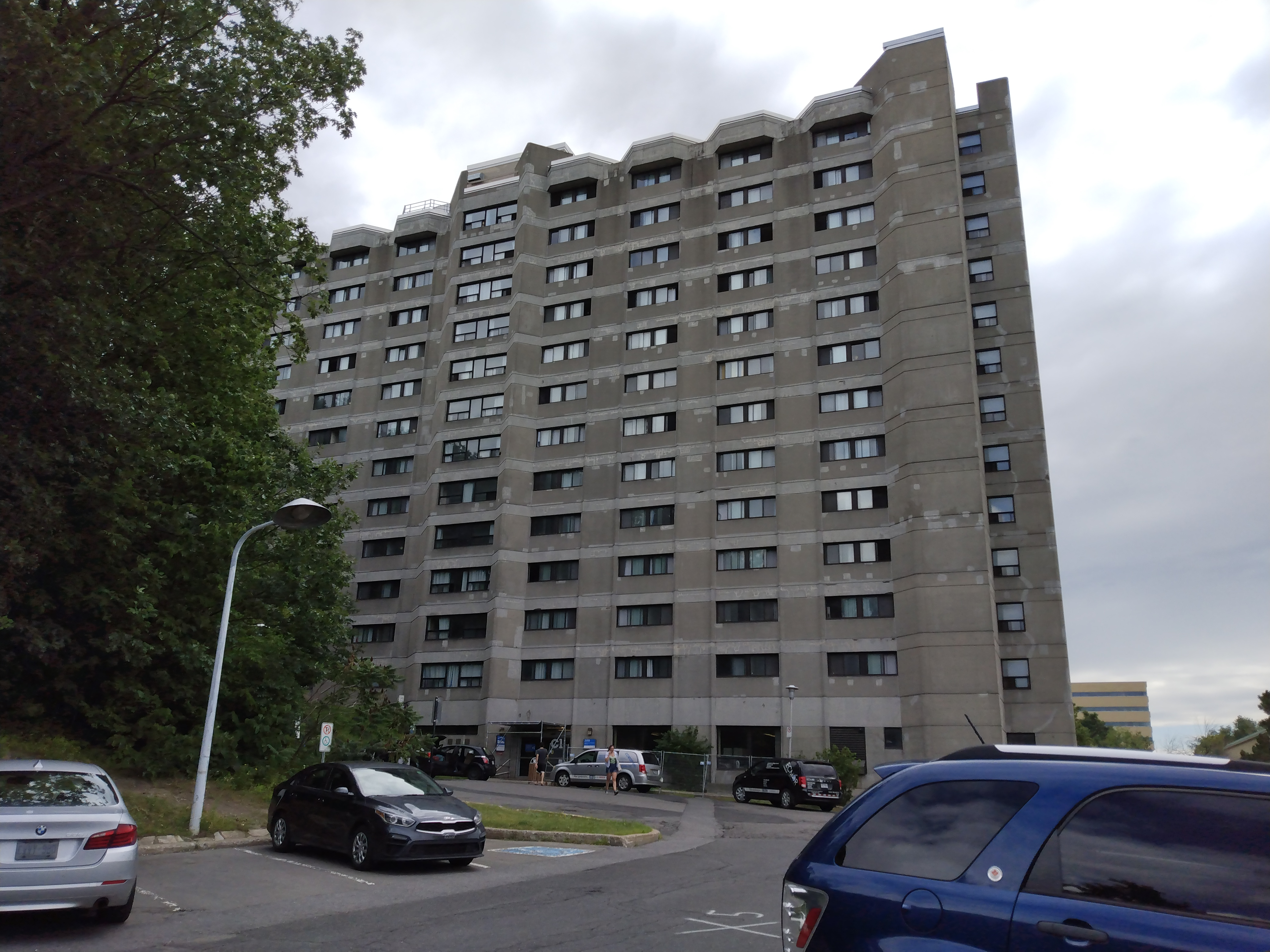
Student residences at Université de Montréal

The school's two main student unions are the Fédération des associations étudiantes du campus de l'Université de Montréal (FAÉCUM), which represents all full-time undergraduate and graduate students, and the Association Étudiante de la Maîtrise et du Doctorat de HEC Montréal (AEMD), which defends the interests of those enrolled in HEC Montréal. FAÉCUM traces its lineage back to 1989, when the Fédération étudiante universitaire du Québec (FEUQ) was founded, and is currently the largest student organization in Québec. Accredited organizations and clubs on campus cover a wide range of interests ranging from academics to cultural, religion and social issues. FAÉCUM is currently associated with 82 student organizations and clubs. Four fraternities and sororities are recognized by the university's student union: Sigma Thêta Pi, Nu Delta Mu, Zeta Lambda Zeta, and Eta Psi Delta.

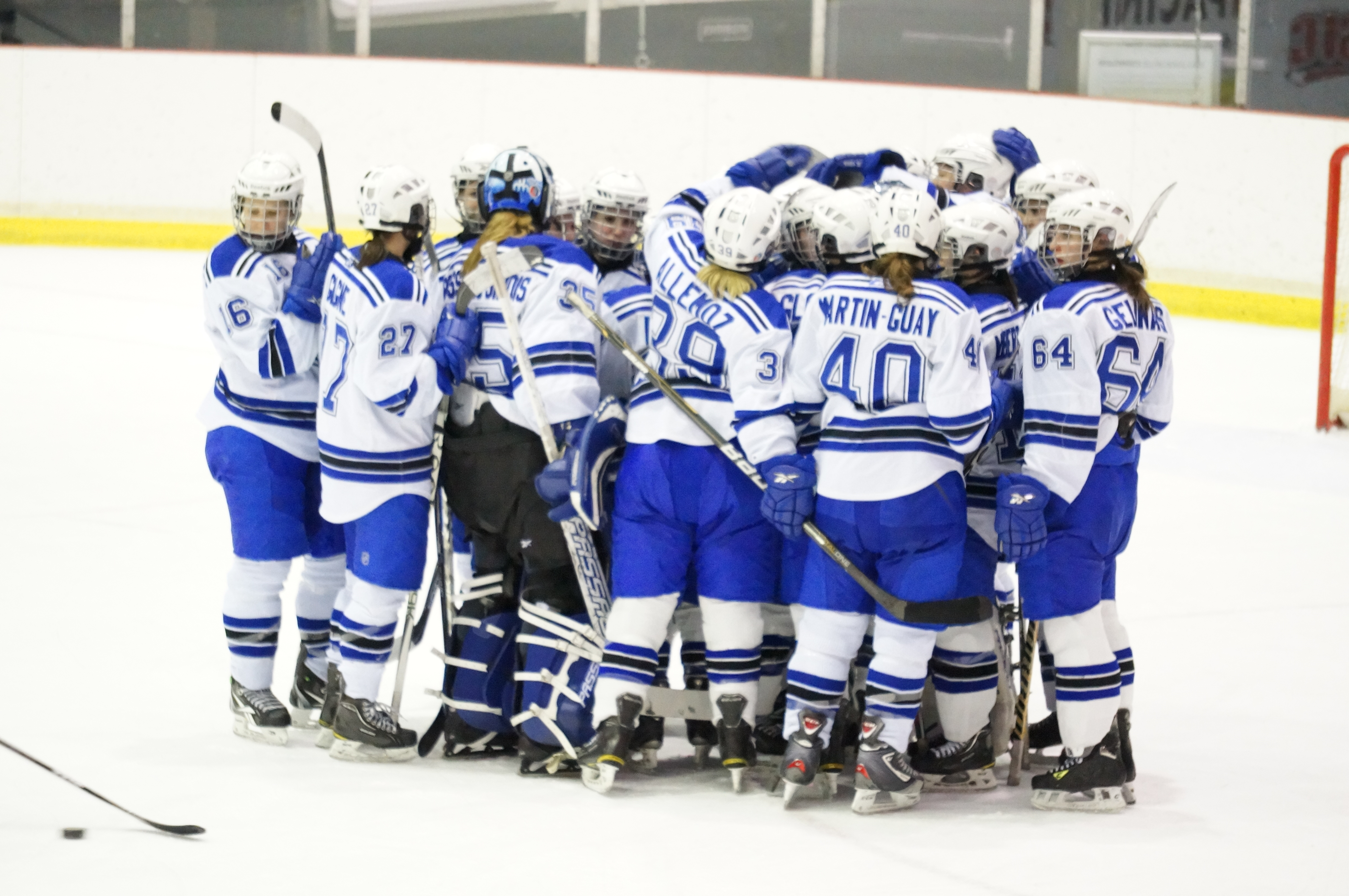
Ice hockey is one of several sports programs run by the Carabins.

=== Media ===
The university's student population operates a number of news media outlets. The Quartier Libre is the school's main student newspaper. CISM-FM is an independently owned radio station of the students of the Université de Montréal and operated by the student union. The radio station dates back to 1970; it received a permit from the Canadian Radio-television and Telecommunications Commission (CRTC) on 10 July 1990 to transmit on an FM band. On 14 March 1991, CISM's broadcasting antenna was boosted to 10 000 watts. With a broadcasting radius of 70 km, CISM is now the world's largest French-language university radio station. The CFTU-DT television station also receives technical and administrative support from the student body.

=== Sports ===
The Université de Montréal's sports teams are known as the Carabins. The Carabins participate in the U Sports' Réseau du sport étudiant du Québec (RSEQ) conference for most varsity sports. Varsity teams include rugby, badminton, Canadian football, cheerleading, golf, hockey, swimming, alpine skiing, soccer, tennis, track and field, cross-country, and volleyball. The athletics program at the university dates back to 1922. The university's athletic facilities is open to both its varsity teams and students. The largest sports facility is the Centre d'éducation physique et des sports de l'Université de Montréal (CEPSUM), which is also home to all of the Carabin's varsity teams. The CEPSUM's building was built in 1976 in preparation for the 1976 Summer Olympics held in Montréal. The outdoor stadium of the CEPSUM, which hosts the university's football team, can seat around 5,100 people.

== Notable people ==
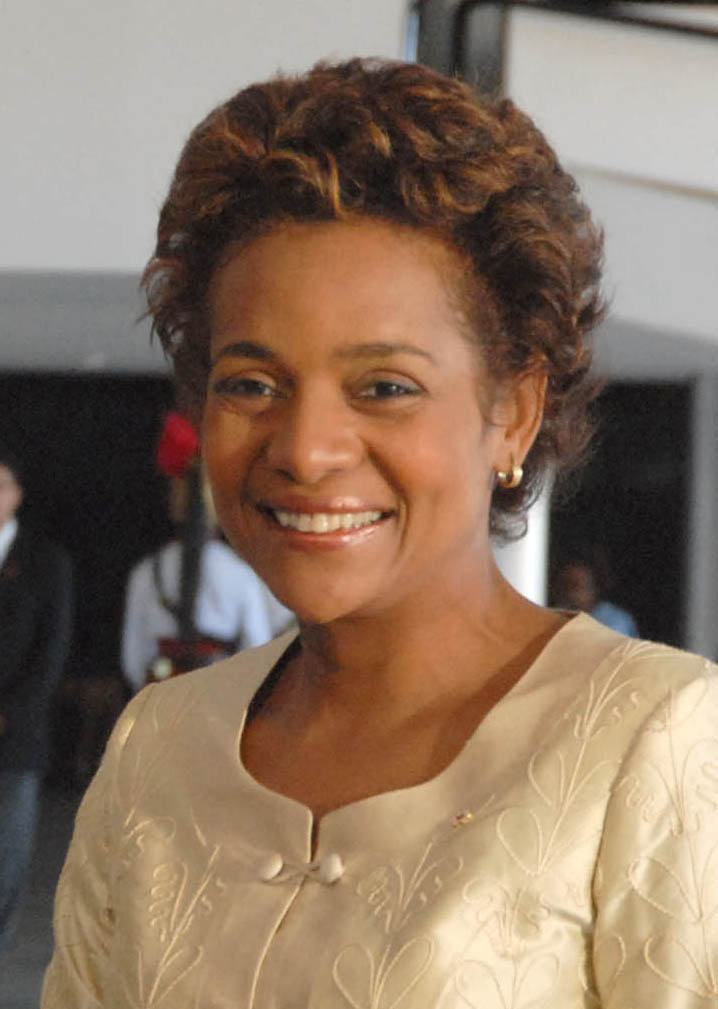
Michaëlle Jean, 27th Governor General of Canada

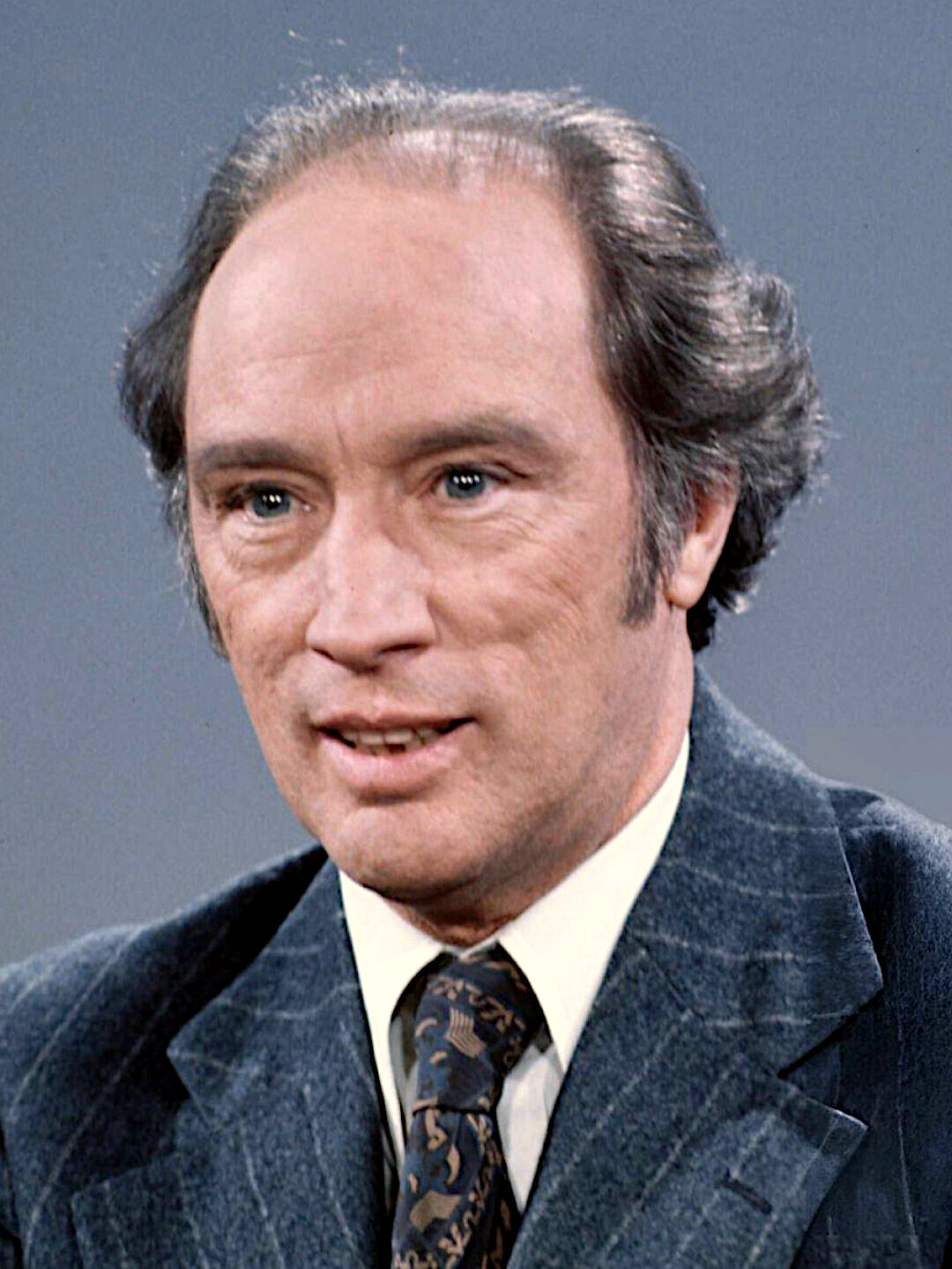
Pierre Trudeau, 15th Prime Minister of Canada

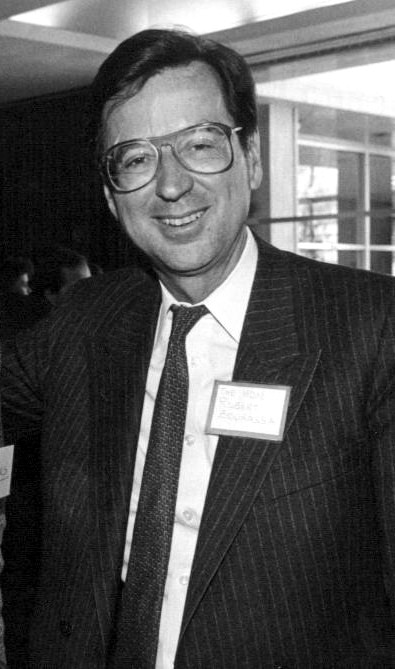
Robert Bourassa, 22nd Premier of Quebec

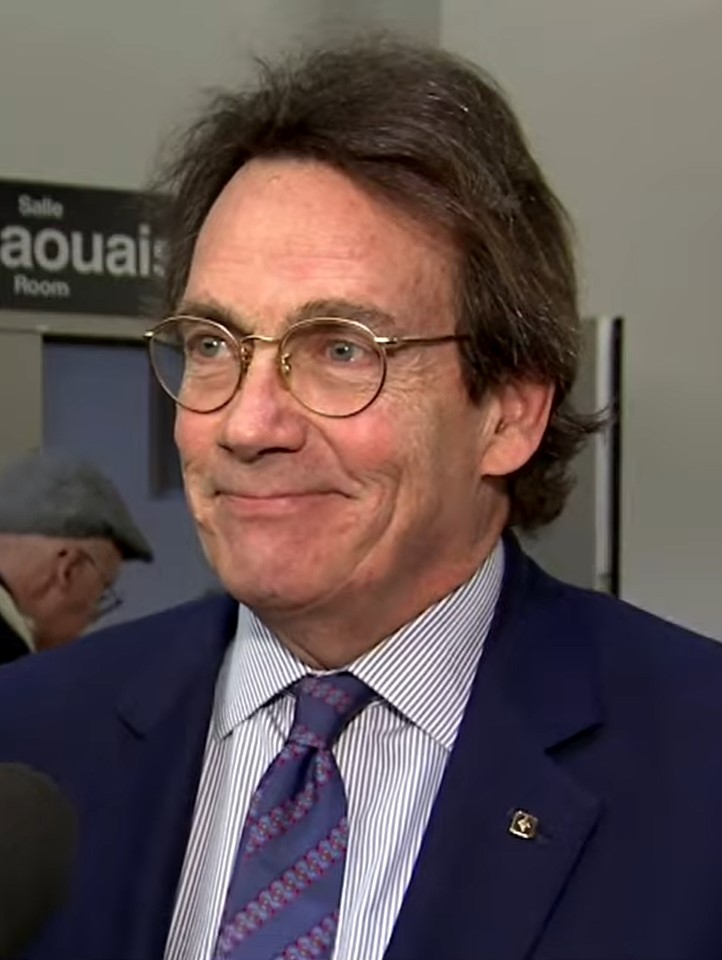
Pierre Karl Péladeau, president and CEO of Quebecor

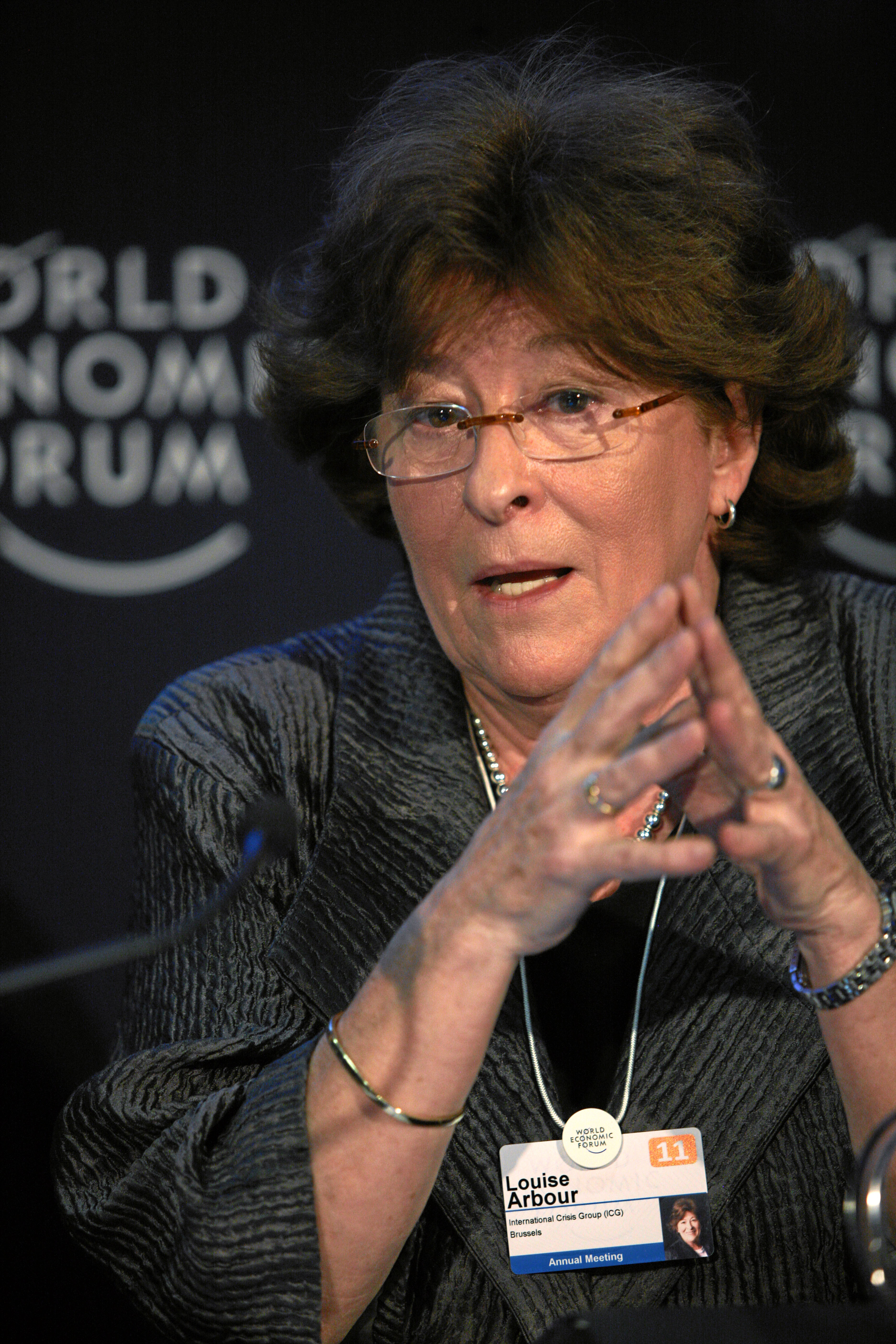
Louise Arbour, 31st Governor General of Canada and 5th United Nations High Commissioner for Human Rights

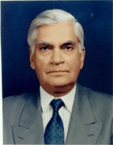
Ishfaq Ahmad, nuclear physicist known for his work with Pakistan's nuclear weapons program

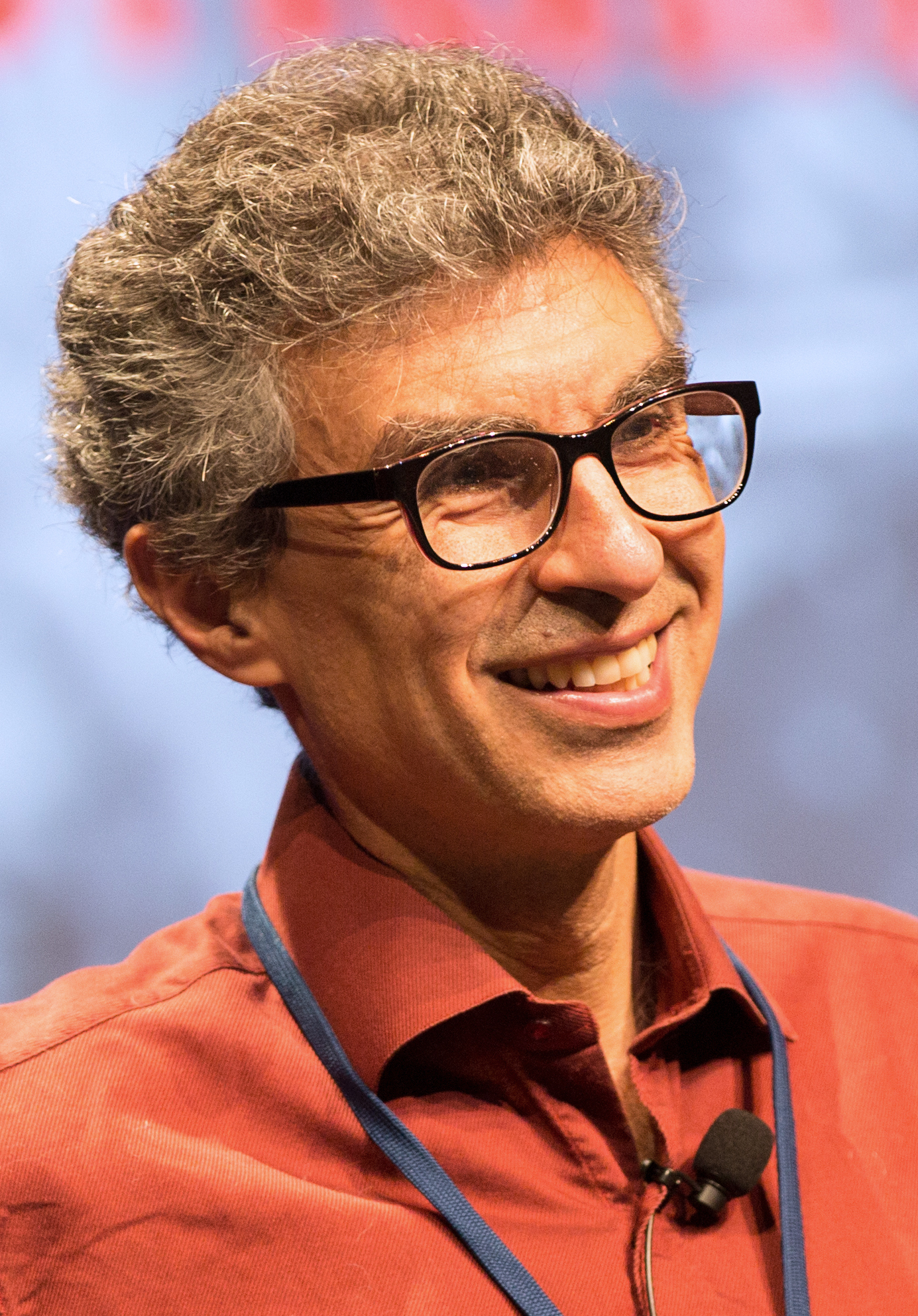
Yoshua Bengio, computer scientist, co-recipient of the 2018 Turing Award for his work in deep learning

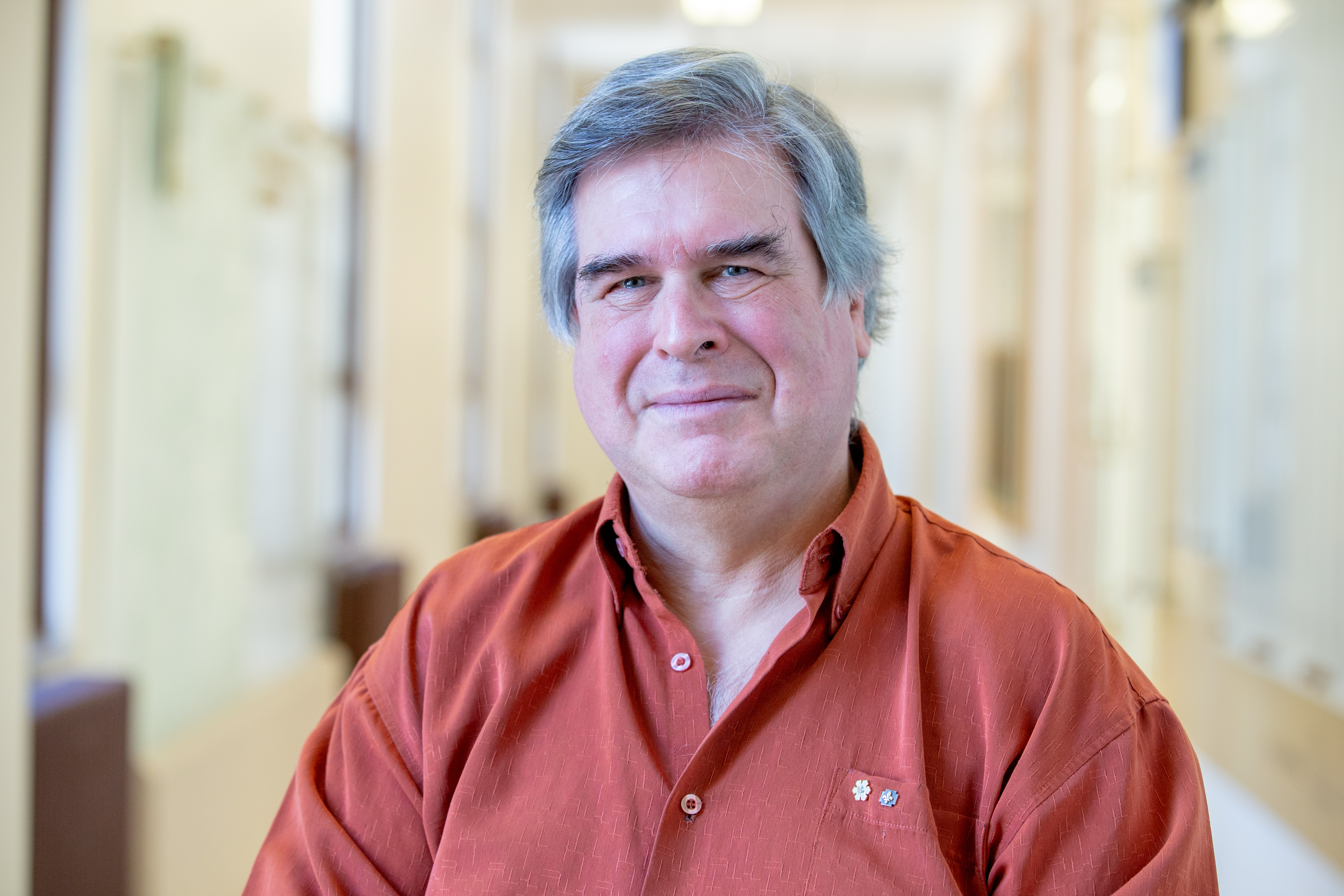
Gilles Brassard, computer scientist, co-recipient of the 2018 Wolf Prize in Physics in quantum information science; shared the 2025 Turing Award for work in quantum information science.

The university has an extensive alumni network, with more than 300,000 members. Throughout the university's history, faculty, alumni, and former students have played prominent roles in a number of fields. Several prominent business leaders have graduated from the university. Graduates include Philippe de Gaspé Beaubien, founder and CEO of Telemedia, Louis R. Chênevert, chairman and CEO of the United Technologies Corporation, and Pierre Karl Péladeau, former president and CEO of Quebecor.

A number of students have also gained prominence for their research and work in a number of scientific fields. Roger Guillemin, a graduate of the university, would later be awarded the Nobel Prize in Physiology or Medicine for his work with neurohormones. Alumnus Ishfaq Ahmad would also gain prominence for his work with Pakistan's nuclear weapon's program. Jocelyn Faubert, known for his work in the fields of visual perception, is currently a faculty member of the university. Gilles Brassard, best known for his fundamental work in quantum cryptography, quantum teleportation, quantum entanglement distillation, quantum pseudo-telepathy, and the classical simulation of quantum entanglement. Ian Goodfellow is a thought leader in the field of artificial intelligence.

Many former students have gained local and national prominence for serving in government, including former Supreme Court of Canada Justice, UN Human Rights Commissioner and Governor General of Canada, Louise Arbour. Michaëlle Jean also served as Governor General and as Secretary-General of the Organisation internationale de la Francophonie, Ahmed Benbitour served as the Prime Minister of Algeria, and Pierre Trudeau served as the Prime Minister of Canada. Eleven Premiers of Quebec have also graduated from the Université de Montréal, including Jean-Jacques Bertrand, Robert Bourassa, Maurice Duplessis, Lomer Gouin, Daniel Johnson, Jr., Daniel Johnson Sr., Pierre-Marc Johnson, Bernard Landry, Jacques Parizeau, Paul Sauvé and Philippe Couillard.

== See also ==
- Mila – Quebec AI Institute
- Centre for International Studies
- Poly-World
- Bill 78
