= Bernard Lamarre =

Canadian engineer and businessman (1931–2016)

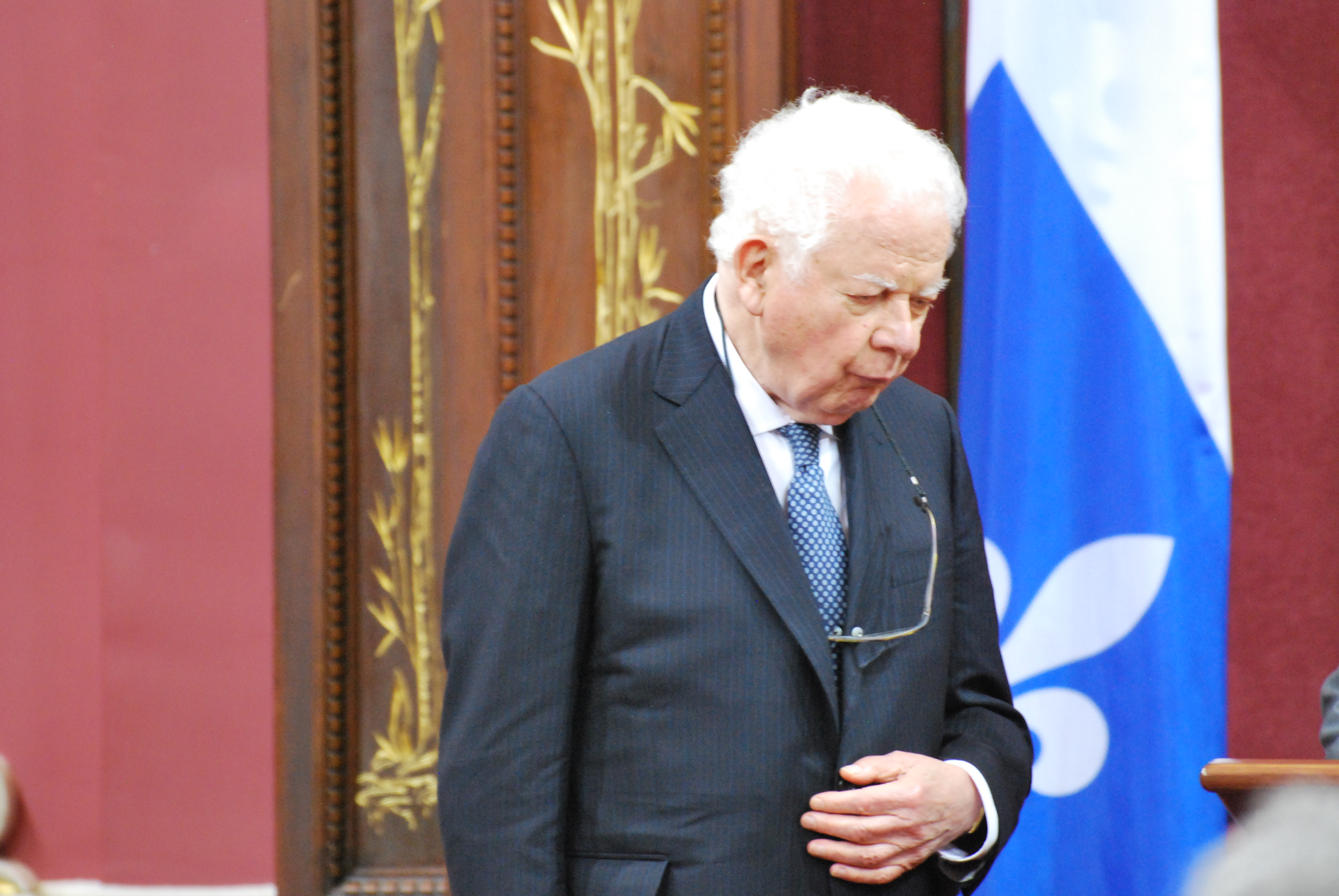
- Lamarre at the 2013 National Order of Quebec ceremony
- Born: 6 August 1931; Chicoutimi, Quebec, Canada
- Died: 30 March 2016 (aged 84); Montreal, Quebec, Canada
- Education: École Polytechnique de Montréal, Imperial College London
- Occupations: engineer and businessman
- Known for: last CEO of Lavalin
- Relatives: Jacques Lamarre, brother

Bernard Lamarre, OC GOQ (6 August 1931 – 30 March 2016) was a Canadian engineer and businessman.

Born in Chicoutimi, Quebec in 1931, Lamarre received a Bachelor of Applied Sciences in Civil Engineering from the École Polytechnique de Montréal, an affiliate college of Université de Montréal, in 1952. He received a Master of Science degree from Imperial College of Science and Technology in 1955 and was a recipient of the Athlone Fellowship. He started work as a soil mechanics engineer with the firm of Lalonde & Valois eventually becoming president and chief executive officer of the firm now called Lavalin Group. He was president of Ordre des ingénieurs du Québec from 1993 to 1997.

== Honours ==
In 1985, he was made an Officer of the Order of Canada in recognition for "his numerous and varied accomplishments" which "earned him a remarkable reputation as an engineer, businessman, and patron". He was also made an Officer of the National Order of Quebec and was promoted to Grand Officer in 2013. He was awarded a Doctor of Laws, honoris causa from Concordia University. He is a Fellow of the Canadian Society for Civil Engineering and the Engineering Institute of Canada.
