= Bernard Etkin =

Canadian academic

Bernard "Ben" Etkin, CM FRSC (May 7, 1918 – June 26, 2014) was a Canadian academic and one of the world's recognized authorities on aircraft guidance and control. He served as dean of the University of Toronto Faculty of Applied Science and Engineering from 1973 to 1979.

== Education and academic work ==
Born in Toronto, Ontario, Etkin was a graduate of the University of Toronto and was Dean of the Faculty of Applied Science and Engineering at the university in the 1970s. Most recently, he was a Professor Emeritus at the University of Toronto Institute for Aerospace Studies.

As an expert in aeronautics and astronautics, he contributed to the design and production of two glider aircraft, including the de Havilland Sparrow, and a number of Avro Canada aircraft, including the Avro Arrow.

== Apollo 13 ==
During the Apollo 13 emergency, U.S. contractor Grumman Aerospace Corp., which built the lunar module for NASA, asked the University of Toronto for help specifically in how to jettison the lunar module just prior to re-entry. A team of six engineers at the university was formed - led by Etkin as the senior scientist - to solve the problem in one day using nothing more than slide rules and collective expertise. (Besides Etkin, the team also consisted of Rod Tennyson, Barry French, Philip Sullivan, Peter Hughes, a specialist in orbital mechanics, and another senior scientist, Irvine Glass, a specialist in shock waves.) Given that a small tunnel connected the lunar module to the command module, the team concluded that if they closed the tunnel hatch and pressurized the tunnel, the astronauts could explosively separate the lunar module and blow it away from the command module just prior to re-entry. The scientists had 6 hours to compute the pressure required using slide-rules. They needed a precise calculation as too high a pressure might damage the hatch and its seal causing the astronauts to burn up; too low, and the lunar module would not separate from the command module. The resulting calculation was relayed by Grumman to NASA, and from there to the astronauts who implemented the solution.

== Honours and awards ==
In 2010, forty years after the Apollo 13 flight, the U of T scientific team was publicly honoured with medals presented to surviving members by the Canadian Air and Space Museum for their role in the incident. One of the astronauts, Fred Haise spoke at the presentation thanking them personally.

Etkin's treatment of six degree of freedom (6-DoF) theory in "Dynamics of Atmospheric Flight" was unusual in being sufficiently general that it touched upon hypersonic flight and was usable in simulating atmospheric reentry.

In 1970, he was made a Fellow of the Royal Society of Canada. In 1980 Etkin received the Thomas W. Eadie Medal from the Royal Society of Canada. He was named to the Order of Canada as a Member in 2003 for his contributions to the aerospace industry in Canada. He died in Toronto on 26 June 2014.

== Works ==
- Dynamics of atmospheric flight. Wiley. 1972. ISBN 978-0-471-24620-6.

== Notes and references ==
- "In memoriam: University Professor Emeritus Bernard (Ben) Etkin". University of Toronto. 2014-07-08.
- "Bernard Etkin helped avert Apollo 13 tragedy". The Globe and Mail.
- "Thomas W. Eadie Medal". The Royal Society of Canada. Archived from the original on 23 March 2012.
- "Prof. Bernard ETKIN Obituary". Toronto Star. legacy.com. July 2, 2014.
- "Canadian Who's Who 1997 entry". University of Toronto Press.
- "Houston, we've solved the problem: Cdn team honoured for helping Apollo 13". The Canadian Press. Alt URL
