= Alec Sehon =

Canadian immunologist (1924–2018)

Alec Herman Sehon FRSC (1924 – 3 February 2018) was a Romanian-born Canadian immunologist.

Sehon was born in Blejoi, Prahova County, Romania and attended the Victoria University of Manchester, earning bachelor's and advanced degrees in chemistry. Sehon moved to Canada in 1952 and began teaching at McGill University. In 1963, he received a Guggenheim Fellowship. He joined the University of Manitoba in 1969, where he founded Canada's first standalone immunology department. In 1977, the Royal Society of Canada presented Sehon with the Thomas W. Eadie Medal. He died at the age of 93 on 3 February 2018 in Ottawa, Ontario, Canada.
