= Poly-World =

Student committee in Polytechnique Montréal

Poly-World (in French: Poly-Monde, Russian: Поли-Мир, Ukrainian: Полі-Світ) - is a student committee based in a French-Canadian engineering school, Polytechnique Montréal, in Montreal (Quebec, Canada).

This committee was founded in 1990 by a group of young students from different engineering fields that wanted to develop their knowledge of business processes, competitiveness and innovation on an international level. These students, François Nadeau, Claude Benoît and Normand Gadoury, therefore organized Poly-Japan, the first mission of what became an independent engineering program orientation at undergraduate level at École Polytechnique.

The primary objective of this student committee is to enable its members to discover competitiveness, innovation and business processes in Quebec companies and then compare their findings on foreign soil through industrial visits to counterpart companies. Each year, the Poly-World council, which includes all coordinators of previous missions and a few teachers, is responsible for the selection of the different industrial sectors that will be studied. These sectors are judged competitive for Quebec and Canada and include aviation, aerospace and pharmaceuticals.

== List of past missions ==
For more details or to consult official documents relative to the missions, visit the Poly-World website.

- 2020 Poly-World: Iceland and Norway
- 2019 Poly-World: Japan
- 2018 Poly-World: India
- 2017 Poly-World: Baltic States and Finland
- 2016 Poly-World: United Kingdom and Ireland
- 2015 Poly-World: South Korea
- 2014 Poly-World: Germany
- 2013 Poly-World: Australia
- 2012 Poly-World: South Africa
- 2011 Poly-World: France (visit to Japan canceled due to the 2011 Tōhoku earthquake and tsunami)
- 2010 Poly-World: Denmark, Netherlands
- 2009 Poly-Russia
- 2008 Poly-World: Taiwan, Hong Kong, Singapore
- 2007 Poly-India
- 2006 Poly-World: Poland, Czech Republic
- 2005 Poly-China
- 2004 Poly-Switzerland
- 2003 Poly-Scandinavia: Norway, Sweden, Finland
- 2002 Poly-Brazil
- 2001 Poly-Spain
- 2000 Poly-Korea: South Korea
- 1999 Poly-Benelux: Belgium, Netherlands, Luxembourg
- 1998 Poly-America: American west coast
- 1997 Poly-France
- 1996 Poly-Germany
- 1995 Poly-Japan
- 1994 Poly-Great Britain
- 1993 Poly-Italy
- 1992 Poly-Scandinavia: Norway, Sweden, Finland
- 1991 Poly-Germany
- 1990 Poly-Japan
