= Elvie L. Smith =

Canadian aviation engineer (1926–1999)

Elvie Lawrence Smith (January 8, 1926, in Eatonia, Saskatchewan – August 4, 1999 in St. Lambert, Quebec) was a Canadian aviation engineer known for his work with gas turbines, and for his time at Pratt & Whitney Canada.

== Education ==
Smith attended the University of Saskatchewan, where he received a bachelor's degree in mechanical engineering in 1947, and subsequently earned a master's in that field from Purdue University.

== Career ==
Smith began his career at the National Research Council, where he spent either five or seven years. In 1957, he joined Pratt and Whitney Canada as an Analytical Engineer. In 1958 or 1959, he was a Chief Project Engineer; in 1962 he was promoted to Engineering Manager; in 1966 he was vice-president of Engineering; and in 1970 or 1973 he was vice-president of Operations.

In 1978, he became Executive Vice President, and in March 1980, was appointed President and CEO, being further selected as Chairman of the Board in 1984. In 1987, he retired, but retained his seat on the board until 1994.

== Personal life ==
In addition to being an aviation engineer, Smith was himself a pilot (having earned his license while at Purdue), with a flight time of over 5300 hours in both powered and unpowered aircraft; as well, three of his four children became commercial airline pilots.

== Recognition ==
In 1985, the Royal Society of Canada awarded Smith the Thomas W. Eadie Medal. In 1992, he was inducted into the Order of Canada, and in 1993, he was inducted into the Canadian Aviation Hall of Fame. In 1997, the American Society of Mechanical Engineers awarded him the R. Tom Sawyer Award.
