= Lavalin =

Canadian civil engineering firm

Lavalin was a Canadian civil engineering and construction firm based in Montreal, Quebec. After a major expansion program in the 1980s that led to financial difficulties, in 1991 Lavalin merged with its long-time competitor, Surveyer, Nenniger & Chenevert Consulting Engineers (SNC), to become today's SNC-Lavalin (now AtkinsRéalis), forming one of the ten largest engineering firms in the world.

== History ==
Lavalin was formed in 1936, through the partnership of Jean-Paul Lalonde and Romeo Valois of Montreal. The company was relatively small until Bernard Lamarre joined Lavalin in 1952, after marrying Louise Lalonde, Jean-Paul's daughter. Now known as Lalonde, Valois, Lamarre, Valois et Associés, the group was reorganised as Lavalin, Inc. Lamarre became head in 1962, and started a major international expansion. By 1970 the company was a major contractor. During the decade, in a partnership with Bechtel of the United States, the company managed the James Bay Project.

As Lavalin expanded, they started buying a number of other companies. This process started with other engineering firms like Fenco Engineering, Shawinigan Engineering, Warnock Hersey and Lafarge Coppee, the European cement and brick company. By the mid-1980s, Lavalin was the largest engineering firm in Canada with 5,700 employees, surpassing their rivals SNC, with revenues of C$500 million in 1983. Lavalin was exporting C$300 million worth of manufactured goods a year. In the mid 1980s, the company was retained for the design-build contract to complete the Montreal's Olympic Stadium including the 20,000 square meter retractable fabric roof.

As the international engineering business became more competitive in the 1980s, Lavalin started to branch out into other industries. In 1986, it acquired an 85% interest in Urban Transportation Development Corporation (UTDC) from the government of Ontario for C$50 million. They then purchased a number of companies unrelated to their engineering core, including the Kemtec petrochemical plant, the Bellechasse Hospital in Montreal, MétéoMédia's Weather Channel properties, book publisher Mondia, and attempted to enter the aircraft leasing business. They also started into the real estate business, including building a new 55-floor headquarters in Montreal.

At the start of the 1990s, Lavalin was a C$1.2 billion conglomerate of more than 70 companies. However, it was also heavily in debt, to the point that its corporate financiers insisted they started selling off parts of the business. In 1991, Lavalin's bankers put it under pressure to be acquired by its chief rival, SNC, a deal that was concluded in August for C$400 million. One estimate ranked the company as the fifth-largest engineering firm in the world. Most of the non-engineering business were sold off as a part of this process; Bombardier bought UTDC and folded it into their Bombardier Transportation division, and Kemtec was sold off.
