= Canadian Academy of Engineering =

The Canadian Academy of Engineering (French: L'Académie canadienne du génie) is a national academy of distinguished professional engineers in fields of engineering, who are elected on the basis of "their distinguished service and contribution to society, to the country and to the profession". Founded in 1987, the academy has over 1000 Fellows (2026). The academy's 36-year history has been published on their website.

== History ==
The academy held its founding meeting on 20 May 1987 in Montreal. The honour of being the first member of the academy was accorded to 98-year-old retired engineer and EIC past president, John Stirling. Robert Legget was elected the founding president of the academy, with Philip Lapp as president-elect, Larkin Kerwin as vice-president, and Léopold Nadeau as secretary-treasurer. In September 1991 the Canadian Academy of Engineering formally joined the International Council of Academies of Engineering and Technological Sciences (CAETS), the currently 26-member independent, non-political international forum for the discussion and communication of engineering issues. In 2000, Micheline Bouchard was elected the first woman president of the CAE. The second, in 2005, was Kathleen Sendall, and the third was Kim Sturgess in 2011.

== Membership ==
The 44 founding Fellows of the academy included 12 Fellows from academia and 32 from industrial, government and non-profit organizations. Around a quarter of them were francophone. Fellows have been inducted into the academy on the basis of having had careers, given services and made contributions to engineering, the profession and society that surpassed what would normally be considered a successful career in the candidate's field. Election has always been through nomination by existing members, verification by Committee, and voting by the membership. There has also been an underlying obligation that inductees be prepared to contribute to the life and work of the academy. The first woman to be inducted into the academy, in 1988, was Danielle Zaikoff.

== Awards ==
The academy announced in 2017 that, partnered with SAE Foundation Canada, it had established two annual student awards aimed at recognizing the importance of aerospace, automotive and transport design engineering. One, the CAE Bruce Aubin SAE Aerospace Design Award, valued at $800, and the other the CAE William G. Belfry Memorial SAE Scholarship, valued at $2000, would be given annually to top engineering students from across Canada.

== See also ==
- List of founding members of the Canadian Academy of Engineering
- Council of Canadian Academies
