= List of University of Waterloo honorary degree recipients =

This is a list of honorary degree recipients from the University of Waterloo.

== A ==
- Judge Rosalie Silberman Abella LLD (1990)
- Karl Acham DLitt (2010)
- Peter Adeniyi DES (2010)
- Alan Adlington LLD (1987)
- Alfred Aho DMath (1992)
- Hira Ahuja DEng (2012)
- Lynaldo C. Albuquerque LLD (1984)
- Doris Anderson LLD (1992)
- Noga Alon DMath (2015)
- Sam Altman DEng (2017)
- Fulton Henry Anderson DLitt (1963)
- Goran Anderson DEng (2017)
- George Andrews DMath (2004)
- Jacob Apkarian DEng (2013)
- Louise Arbour LLD (2006)
- Raffi Armenian LLD (1980)
- Norman Ashton DSc (2007)
- Alain Aspect DSc (2014)
- Sir Michael Atiyah DMath (1993)
- Harold Atwood DSc (2010)
- Margaret Atwood DLitt (1985)
- Patrick G. Awuah, Jr. DEng (2018)
- Lloyd Axworthy DLitt (2014)

== B ==
- Morrel Bachynski LLD (1993)
- Chunli Bai DEng (2017)
- George Baird DEng (2011)
- Irving Baker LLD (2004)
- Egon Balas DMath (2005)
- Thomas Whitfield Baldwin DLitt (1962)
- Mary Jo Bales LLD (2010)
- Jim Balsillie LLD (2007)
- Henry Baltes DEng (2000)
- Albert Bandura DLitt (1990)
- Albert Sherwood Barber LLD (1975)
- H. Douglas Barber DEng (1997)
- George Alfred Barnard DMath (1983)
- Christopher R. Barnes DSc (2007)
- Matthew Barrett LLD (1994)
- Neil Bartlett DSc (1968)
- Ray Bartnikas DEng (2002)
- Bertha Bassam LLD (1965)
- Theodore Louis Batke LLD (1982)
- James Bauer DES (1991)
- Walter A. Bean LLD (1991)
- Jan Beenakker DSc (1991)
- J. Alan Beesley DES (1984)
- Monique Bégin LLD (2010)
- John Nigel Berridge Bell DES (1998)
- Richard Bellman DMath (1975)
- Miodrag Belosevic DSc (2013)
- Tim Benbow LLD (1994)
- Thomas Rodney Berger DES (1979)
- John Bergsma LLD (1997)
- Norman Berkowitz DEng (1991)
- Albert Edward Berry DSc (1963)
- Pierre Berton LLD (1988)
- Robert Birgeneau DSc (2009)
- Robert Bixby DMath (2013)
- Robert Harold Blackburn LLD (1965)
- Cindy Blackstock LLD (2016)
- Sidney Martin Blair DEng (1977)
- Elizabeth Bloomfield LLD (2014)
- Hans Blumenfeld DES (1974)
- Kurt-Friedrich Bohrer DLitt (1993)
- Pierre Borne DEng (2006)
- A. Alan Borovoy LLD (2009)
- Micheline Bouchard DEng (2002)
- Larry Bourne DES (1999)
- George Box DMath (2000)
- Richard Dagobert Brauer DMath (1968)
- Raymond Breton DLitt (2000)
- David Brillinger DMath (2003)
- Scott Brisbin LLD (2005)
- Bertram Neville Brockhouse DSc (1969)
- Wallace Broecker DSc (2015)
- Charles Bronfman LLD (1995)
- Allison Brooks DEng (2016)
- Samuel Bronfman LLD (1961)
- Michael Brookes LLD (1992)
- David Brooks DES (2012)
- Jack Ernest Brown LLD (1965)
- James Bruce DES (1994)
- Angus A. Bruneau DEng (2007)
- Tom Brzustowski DEng (1997)
- Bruno Buchberger DMath (2011)
- Hans Bühlmann DMath (1995)
- Ian Burton DES (2013)

== C ==
- Jules Carbotte DSc (1994)
- Jan Carr DEng (2010)
- Marjorie Edna Carroll LLD (1982)
- G. Emmitt Cardinal Carter LLD (1989)
- Arthur Carty DSc (1997)
- Humphrey Carver DES (1989)
- Susan Cartwright DES (2019)
- Therese F. Casgrain LLD (1974)
- Francis Castellino DSc (1994)
- Amit Chakma DEng (2010)
- Floyd S. Chalmers LLD (1991)
- Joan Chalmers LLD (1994)
- Savvas Chamberlain DEng (2007)
- Jean Chamberlain Froese LLD (2013)
- John Chambers DMath (2004)
- Tony Chan DMath (2022)
- John Herbert Chapman DEng (1969)
- Lyman John Chapman DSc (1985)
- See Leang Chin DSc (2008)
- Donald Alexander Chisholm DEng (1979)
- Norman Choate LLD (1989)
- Calvin Choi DMath (2021)
- Ven Te Chow DEng (1978)
- James Walter Church LLD (1973)
- Colonel Edward Churchill DEng (1968)
- Antoni Cimolino DLitt (2019)
- H. Spencer Clark LLD (1985)
- G. E. Clarke DLitt (2006)
- John Clague DSc (2017)
- Frank Clifford LLD (2002)
- Major James William Coldwell LLD (1970)
- Jean-Phillipe Collard DLitt (2011)
- Joseph Orr Connell LLD (1976)
- Manfred Conrad LLD (2009)
- George Ramsay Cook DLitt (2005)
- Stephen Cook DMath (1999)
- James Cooper DEng (2016)
- Michael C Corballis LLD (1998)
- Beatrice Marion Corrigan DLitt (1966)
- J. Roderick Coutts DEng (2007)
- Ian McTaggart Cowan DES (1976)
- Sir David Roxbee Cox DMath (1991)
- Harold Scott MacDonald Coxeter DMath (1969)
- David Crombie LLD (1996)
- Edward Lewis Crossley LLD (1964)
- Ross A. Cruickshank LLD (1979)
- Mihaly Csikszentmihalyi LLD (2016)

== D ==
- Camille A. Dagenais DEng (1986)
- Kevin Dancey LLD (2019)
- John Daniel LLD (1993)
- Pierre Dansereau DES (1972)
- Carl Dare LLD (2007)
- Regna Darnell DLitt (2009)
- Allan G. Davenport DEng (1986)
- Alexander Davidson DES (1990)
- W. Robertson Davies DLitt (1981)
- William Grenville Davis LLD (1982)
- Valerie Davidson DEng (2022)
- Dora De Pedery-Hunt LLD (1990)
- Clarence de Silva DEng (2008)
- Jamal Deen DEng (2011)
- Anne Dell DSc (2011)
- Jerome Dempsey DSc (1990)
- M. Guy Denielou DEng (1987)
- John Dennis DMath (2012)
- Denis Desautels LLD (2002)
- Laurie Dexter LLD (1997)
- Olive Patricia Dickason LLD (2000)
- Pierre H. Dixneuf LLD (1996)
- Denise Donlon LLD (2007)
- David Donoho DMath (2016)
- Roger Dorton DEng (1989)
- Ronald Douglas DMath (2010)
- Roger Downer DSc (2004)
- James Downey LLD (2005)
- Duncan Dowson DEng (2001)
- Aleksis Dreimanis DSc (1969)
- George Alexander Drew LLD (1964)
- Louise Du Pasquier DSc (2005)
- Robert S. Dudley DEng (1988)
- Dorothy Duncan LLD (1996)
- V. Roy Duxbury LLD (1985)
- Onkar Prasad Dwivedi DES (2008)
- Howard J. Dyck LLD (1996)
- Peter J. Dyck LLD (1974)
- Kenneth Dye DLitt (1991)

== E ==
- Cyrus Stephen Eaton LLD (1969)
- Marvin Edelman DSc (1999)
- Peter Egelstaff DSc (1992)
- Barbara Ehrenreich DLitt (2015)
- Paul Embrechts DMath (2007)
- Charles Leslie Emery LLD (1986)
- Paul Erdős DMath (1981, renounced 1996)
- Hon. Trevor Eyton LLD (1992)

== F ==
- Emil Fackenheim DLitt (1998)
- Barker Fairley DLitt (1961)
- Stuart Feldman DMath (2010)
- Max Ferguson LLD (1991)
- David Finney DMath (1989)
- Sheila Fischman LLD (2001)
- Arthur John Fisher DEng (1975)
- Jean B. Forest LLD (1996)
- Eugene Alfred Forsey LLD (1968)
- Kenneth Frampton DES (1995)
- Felix Franks DSc (1995)
- John Frank LLD (2017)
- Donald Fraser DMath (1992)
- Sheila Fraser LLD (2005)
- Louise Frechette LLD (2004)
- Allan Freeze DSc (2002)
- Guy Fregault DLitt (1968)
- Douglas Fregin DEng (2022)
- Joesph Winfield Fretz LLD (1982)
- Brant Fries LLD (2016)
- Glenn Ansel Fry DSc (1983)
- Northrop Frye DLitt (1972)
- Peter Fulde DSc (1998)

== G ==
- Biruté Galdikas DLitt (1995)
- Zvi Galil DMath (2012)
- John Gartner DSc (2013)
- William Arthur Gartrell LLD (1968)
- William Henry Gauvin DEng (1967)
- A. Bruce Gellatly LLD (1984)
- Peter George LLD (2009)
- Hans-Ulrich Gerber DMath (2013)
- Malcolm Gladwell DLitt (2007)
- Anne Glover DSc (2015)
- Hugh Quintin Golder DEng (1981)
- Shafrira ``Shafi'' Goldwasser DMath (2019)
- Gene H. Golub DMath (1987)
- Thomas Goodale DLitt (2006)
- Donald Gordon LLD (1966)
- Calvin Carl Gotlieb DMath (1968)
- George Wheeler Govier DEng (1985)
- Gerald Sandford Graham DLitt (1973)
- Ronald Graham DMath (2010)
- Larry Gravill LLD (2009)
- John Morgan Gray DLitt (1971)
- Lawrence Green DSc (2006)
- Richard J. Gwyn LLD (2007)

== H ==
- Chris Hadfield DSc (2014)
- Rudolph Haering DSc (1990)
- Joseph Gerald Hagey LLD (1969)
- Abraham Halevy DSc (2003)
- Douglas Hall LLD (1992)
- Lyle Hallman LLD (2001)
- Paul Halmos DMath (1990)
- Joseph Mervyn Hambley DEng (1965)
- Louis-Edmond Hamelin DES (1984)
- Alvin E. Hamielec DEng (1998)
- Albert Hamilton DLitt (2001)
- David Hand DMath (2023)
- Reg Haney LLD (2007)
- Peter Harder LLD (2005)
- Robert Harding LLD (2005)
- Walter Edgar Harris DSc (1987)
- James Hartle DSc (2004)
- Betty Havens DLitt (1994)
- John Frederick Heard DSc (1972)
- Ann Heath DSc (2022)
- John Heath DSc (2022)
- Donald Olding Hebb DSc (1963)
- Paul Hebert DSc (2011)
- Theodore Allen Heinrich LLD (1960)
- John Helliwell DLitt (2022)
- Erwin Hellner DSc (1991)
- Gordon Roberts Henderson LLD (1982)
- Karla Henderson DLitt (2011)
- John Hennessey DMath (2012)
- Martha Henry LLD (2000)
- Harry Biggar Herrington DSc (1971)
- Rolf-Dieter Heuer DSc (2014)
- George R. Hibbard DLitt (1986)
- Michael W. Higgins DLitt (2014)
- Lawrence Hill DLitt (2011)
- Sir Graham John Hills LLD (1991)
- Lotta Hitschmanova LLD (1988)
- John Hobday DLitt (2003)
- Nora Ross Hodgins LLD (1973)
- Evert Hoek DSc (1994)
- Henry William Hofstetter DSc (1977)
- Helen Battles Sawyer Hogg DSc (1962)
- Otto Holden DSc (1962)
- John Wendell Holmes LLD (1976)
- Yinxing Hong LLD (2009)
- Chaviva Hösek LLD (2003)
- Howard Howland DSc (2006)
- Eric Hultman DSc (1996)
- Robert J. Hunter LLD (2007)
- Neil Barron Hutcheon DEng (1975)
- Noel Hynes DSc (1987)

== I ==
- Frank Iacobucci LLD (2003)
- Thomas Ranald Ide LLD (1978)
- Mary Quayle Innis DLitt (1965)
- Donald C. Iverson DSc (2007)

== J ==
- Kenneth Bell Jackson DSc (1960)
- Leonard Cecil Jackson DSc (1965)
- Irwin Mark Jacobs DEng (2005)
- Marilyn Jacox DSc (2006)
- Roberta Jamieson LLD (2005)
- Mo Jamshidi DEng (2004)
- Ralph Lent Jeffery DMath (1972)
- Tom Jenkins LLD (2013)
- David Lloyd Johnston LLD (2010)
- Robert Johnston LLD (2002)

== K ==
- William Kahan DMath (1998)
- Abdul Kalam DEng (2010)
- Tayeb Kamali DEng (2010)
- Robert Kaplan DLitt (2008)
- Irving Kaplansky DMath (1968)
- Richard M. Karp DMath (2007)
- Josef Kates DMath (2005)
- Alan Kay DMath (2008)
- John Keating DEng (2011)
- Reynold Gilbert Keats DMath (1979)
- Ralph Keeney DEng (2014)
- John Kelton DSc (2009)
- Gerhard Kennepohl DEng (2009)
- Robert Kerr LLD (1998)
- Barbara Lee Keyfitz DMath (2010)
- John Kirkaldy DEng (1992)
- Murray Klamkin DMath (1983)
- Jacob Klassen LLD (1989)
- Maria Klawe DMath (2003)
- Claudia Klüppelberg DMath (2022)
- Bartha Maria Knoppers LLD (2001)
- Donald E. Knuth DLitt (2000)
- Joy Kogawa LLD (2003)
- Faquir C. Kohli DEng (1990)
- Paavo Komi DSc (2002)
- Jaroslav Koutecky DMath (1980)
- Claire Kramsch DLitt (2012)
- Matthew Kuhn DEng (1985)
- Prabha Kundur DEng (2004)
- Alfred Kuntz LLD (2001)
- Ivan Kuscer DSc (1996)

== L ==
- Margaret Wade Labarge LLD (1993)
- Janos Ladik DMath (1985)
- Bernard Lamarre DEng (1984)
- Jacques Lamarre DEng (2006)
- Phyllis Lambert LLD (2000)
- Peter Landsberg DSc (1995)
- Ronald Lang DLitt (2014)
- Michael Langham LLD (1967)
- Robert P. Langlands DMath (1988)
- Theresa Lau Po LLD (1995)
- Michel Lavalou DEng (1994)
- Mike Lazaridis DEng (2000)
- Carol Leaman DLitt (2022)
- Donald James Le Roy DSc (1978)
- Mary Jo Leddy LLD (1995)
- Thomas Lee DEng (2013)
- Yuan T. Lee DSc (1986)
- Robert Ferguson Legget DSc (1963)
- William Leggett DSc (1992)
- Horst Leipholz DEng (1987)
- Raymond Urgel Lemieux DSc (1980)
- Douglas Valentine LePan DLitt (1973)
- Doulgas Letson LLD (2006)
- Franco Levi DEng (1993)
- Jack Lewis DSc (1988)
- Stephen Lewis LLD (2013)
- Walter Lewis DSc (1998)
- Andre Leon Lichnerowicz DMath (1977)
- Barbara Liskov DMath (2019)
- Walter F. Light DEng (1985)
- Y. K. Lin DEng (1994)
- Dorothy Livesay DLitt (1973)
- Daniel Livingstone DSc (2000)
- Laszlo Lovasz DMath (1992)
- R. Duncan Luce DMath (2007)
- Terry Lyons DMath (2017)

== M ==
- Flora MacDonald LLD (2006)
- J. Ross MacKay DES (1981)
- Hugh MacLennan DLitt (1977)
- James MacNeil DSc (1993)
- Robert Magee DEng (2011)
- Lee Maracle LLD (2019)
- Rudolph Marcus DSc (2002)
- William Marras DSc (2004)
- Chuck Margo DEng (2021)
- Victor Martens LLD (1992)
- Murray Martin LLD (2009)
- Burton Clare Matthews LLD (1982)
- Ingrid Mattson LLD (2017)
- Barry Mazur DMath (2016)
- Robert Baird McClure LLD (1970)
- Art McDonald DSc (2012)
- Dianne McGarry LLD (1999)
- Keith McIntyre LLD (1993)
- Alexander "Sandy" McKay DLitt (1993)
- Stan McKay LLD (2002)
- John McKnight DLitt (2013)
- Digby J. McLaren DSc (1996)
- Colonel Robert Samuel McLaughlin DEng (1968)
- Norman W. McLeod DEng (1980)
- Robert McMichael LLD (1983)
- Signe McMichael LLD (1983)
- General Andrew George Latta McNaughton DEng (1966)
- Ian McPhee DMath (2011)
- Trina McQueen LLD (1999)
- Kurt Mehlhorn DMath (2006)
- John Meisel DLitt (1998)
- Axel Meisen DEng (2008)
- Ronald Melzack DLitt (1992)
- Keith Miller DEng (1998)
- Victor Milligan DEng (1990)
- William Milne DEng (2003)
- Edwin Mirvish LLD (1969)
- Paul D. Mitchell LLD (2001)
- Tanya Moisewitsch DLitt (1977)
- Cleve Moler DMath (2001)
- Mario Molina DSc (2002)
- David Aaron Monson LLD (1964)
- Malcolm Moore DSc (2014)
- Pat Mooney LLD (2017)
- Cathleen Morawetz DMath (1993)
- Louis Joel Mordell DMath (1970)
- Lawrence Morley DES (2001)
- Robert Mott DSc (1990)
- Zenon Mróz DEng (1999)
- Robert Mundell LLD (2006)
- Rex Murphy LLD (2008)
- James Murray DMath (2006)
- Kenneth Murray LLD (1995)

== N ==
- Crispin St. John Alvah Nash-Williams DMath (1994)
- Arokia Nathan DSc (2019)
- Ira George Needles LLD (1975)
- William Needles LLD (1999)
- Arkadi Nemirovski DMath (2009)
- Pierre Nepveu DLitt (2010)
- Bernhard H. Neumann DMath (1986)
- Alex Neve LLD (2016)
- Yves-Henri Nouailhat DLitt (2000)

== O ==
- Val O'Donovan DEng (1995)
- Kenneth Ogilvie DES (2009)
- Takeshi Oka DSc (2001)
- Norio Okada DEng (1995)
- Dianne O'Leary DMath (2005)
- Patricia O'Malley LLD (2016)
- Alexander Markovich Ostrowski DMath (1968)
- Bernard Ostry LLD (1997)
- Sylvia Ostry LLD (1997)
- Pingkai Ouyang DEng (2010)

== P ==
- Janice Palmer LLD (2000)
- John Panabaker LLD (1991)
- Tae-Joon Park DEng (1991)
- Tom Pashby DSc (1996)
- Giles Patry DEng (2008)
- Gordon Neill Patterson DSc (1962)
- Julie Payette DSc (2010)
- Bryan Roger Payne DSc (1986)
- Bill Pearson DSc (1987)
- Richard Peltier DSc (2007)
- Terence Penelhum DLitt (1990)
- Sir Roger Penrose DSc (2004)
- Alan Jay Perlis DMath (1974)
- Howard Earle Petch LLD (1982)
- Frank Cornelius Peters LLD (1978)
- Woldemar Petri DEng (1989)
- Dirk Pette DSc (2000)
- William A. Phang DEng (1991)
- David Phillips DES (2004)
- Cyril Robert Philp LLD (1963)
- Alison Phipps DLitt (2023)
- Jean Pigott LLD (1993)
- Douglas Humphreys Pimlott DES (1978)
- John Charles Polanyi DSc (1970)
- John A. Pollack LLD (2007)
- George Polya DMath (1971)
- Vincent Poor DEng (2019)
- Alf Erling Porsild DSc (1973)
- Dana Harris Porter LLD (1966)
- John Porter DLitt (1977)
- Beryl Potter LLD (1992)
- William Prager DEng (1969)
- Gerald Pratley LLD (1993)
- Ross Prentice DMath (2004)
- Robert Prichard LLD (2002)
- Terry D. Prowse DES (2007)

== R ==
- Richard Rado DMath (1986)
- George Raithby DEng (2007)
- Calyampudi Radhakrishna Rao DMath (1997)
- J.N.K. Rao DMath (2008)
- William Howard Rapson DEng (1976)
- Harmon Ray DEng (2003)
- George Elmore Reaman LLD (1969)
- Nancy Reid DMath (2015)
- David G. Rempel LLD (1983)
- Col. George Renison LLD (1994)
- Gerry Remers DLitt (2022)
- Eric Rentschler DLitt (2013)
- Bruce Rittmann DEng (2014)
- Ronald Rivest DMath (2014)
- John Parmenter Robarts LLD (1968)
- Dennis Robertson DEng (1987)
- Stephen George Bellamy Robinson LLD (1962)
- Roy Romanow LLD (2015)
- Robert Rosehart DEng (2006)
- Emilio Rosenblueth DEng (1983)
- Serge Rossignol DSc (2006)
- David Roulston DEng (2011)
- F. Sherwood Rowland DSc (2001)
- John Ruggie DLitt (2012)
- Hanno Rund DMath (1984)
- Gordon Ruskell DSc (2000)
- Joseph Francis Ryan LLD (1963)

== S ==
- Andrew Sage DEng (1987)
- Martha Salcudean DEng (2009)
- Indira Samarasekera DEng (2010)
- Marie Sanderson DES (1998)
- David Sankoff DMath (2019)
- Robert Sanson-Fisher DSc (2008)
- Andrew Sarlos LLD (1995)
- Shankar Sastry DEng (2016)
- Dianne Saxe DES (2022)
- Carl Fellman Schaefer DLitt (1976)
- Stephen Scherer DSc (2017)
- Ronald Schlegel LLD (2005)
- Grace Schmidt LLD (1999)
- Wolfgang Schmidt DMath (2005)
- Alexander Schrijver DMath (2002)
- Maurice Schroeder LLD (2012)
- Giacinto Scoles DSc (2000)
- Edward Walter Scott DD (1984)
- Glenn T. Seaborg DSc (1997)
- Lawrence Crawley Sentance DEng (1974)
- Paul Seymour DMath (2008)
- Basma Shalaby DEng (2005)
- Adi Shamir DMath (2009)
- Leslie W. Shemilt DEng (1996)
- Belle Shenkman LLD (1989)
- Ernest Siddall DEng (1991)
- Cornelius Louis Siegfried LLD (1966)
- Peter Sims LLD (1999)
- Claudine Simson LLD (1999)
- Madan G. Singh DEng (1996)
- Vijay Singh DEng (2010)
- Charles Slichter DSc (1993)
- Michael Smith DSc (1997)
- John Smol DSc (2012)
- Barbara Claassen Smucker DLitt (1986)
- Ronald M.C. So DEng (2005)
- Omond McKillop Solandt DEng (1968)
- Margaret Somerville LLD (2004)
- Richard Stanley DMath (2007)
- Ralph G. Stanton DMath (1997)
- Richard B. Stein DSc (1991)
- Edward Emslie Stewart LLD (1982)
- Finlay Gordon Stewart LLD (1972)
- Gordon Stone DSc (1992)
- Anne Penfold Street DMath (1996)
- Gordon Streib DLitt (1991)
- Harvey Richard Lyle Streight DSc (1962)
- Ernest J. Swalm LLD (1977)
- Peter Charles Swann LLD (1991)

== T ==
- James John Talman DLitt (1960)
- Wai-Cheung Tang DEng (2007)
- Réal Tanguay DEng (2012)
- Robert Tarjan DMath (2015)
- William M. Tatham DEng (2012)
- Neale Hamilton Tayler LLD (1982)
- Carson Howard Templeton DES (1983)
- Rudolph Thauer DSc (2007)
- Jacquelyn Thayer Scott LLD (1998)
- Joseph Thorarinn Thorson LLD (1965)
- Chang-Lin Tien DEng (1995)
- James Tien DEng (2009)
- Brian Tighe DSc (2004)
- Joseph Wenceslaus "Jim" Tomecko LLD (1964)
- Alan Tomlinson DSc (2016)
- Senator Arthur Julien Tremblay LLD (1983)
- Bruce Trigger DLitt (1990)
- David Tse DEng (2019)
- Yi-Fu Tuan DES (1985)
- John Tukey DMath (1999)
- Endel Tulving DLitt (1987)
- Ada Dorothy Turville LLD (1964)
- Bill Tutte DMath (1987)

== U ==
- Jane Urquhart DLitt (1997)

== V ==
- Leslie Valiant DMath (2013)
- Andies van Dam DMath (2007)
- Harold Withrow Vaughan LLD (1975)
- Ashok Vijh DSc (1993)
- Margaret Visser LLD (2006)
- Andrew Viterbi DEng (1990)
- Dan-Virgil Voiculescu DMath (2014)
- Vukan Vuchic DES (2014)

== W ==
- Jeffery Page Rein Wadsworth LLD (1983)
- Pamela Wallin LLD (2003)
- Ying Wang DES (2001)
- Harry Verney Warren DSc (1975)
- Robert Lambert Waterhouse LLD (1981)
- Prem Watsa LLD (2017)
- Peter Watson DEng (2009)
- William John Webber DSc (1961)
- Rudy Weibe DLitt (2005)
- Steven Weinberg DSc (2004)
- David Weitz DSc (2016)
- Dominic Welsh DMath (2006)
- Harold Whiting DSc (1992)
- Meir Wilchek DSc (1989)
- David Wilkie DMath (2002)
- James Hardy Wilkinson DMath (1978)
- James Wilson LLD (1997)
- Annie Leung Kit Wah Wong LLD (2007)
- Ming-ko Woo DES (2016)
- George Woo DSc (2019)
- Douglas T. Wright LLD (1995)
- Janet Wright LLD (1999)
- Margaret Wright DMath (2003)
- W. David Wright DSc (1991)
- Chien-Fu Jeff Wu DMath (2008)

== Y ==
- Andrew Chi-Chih Yao DMath (2009)
- Shing-Tung Yau DMath (2011)
- Morden Yolles DES (2002)

== Z ==
- Lotfi Zadeh DEng (2003)
- Mona Zaghloul DEng (2007)
- Rudolf Zahradnik DSc (2002)
- Stephen Zeff DLitt (2010)
- Efim Zelmanov DMath (2017)
- Joyce Zemans DLitt (2004)
- Ronald Zernicke DSc (2008)

== Sources ==
- Honorary degrees granted | Secretariat | University of Waterloo
