= Fast ferry scandal =

1990s scandal in British Columbia, Canada

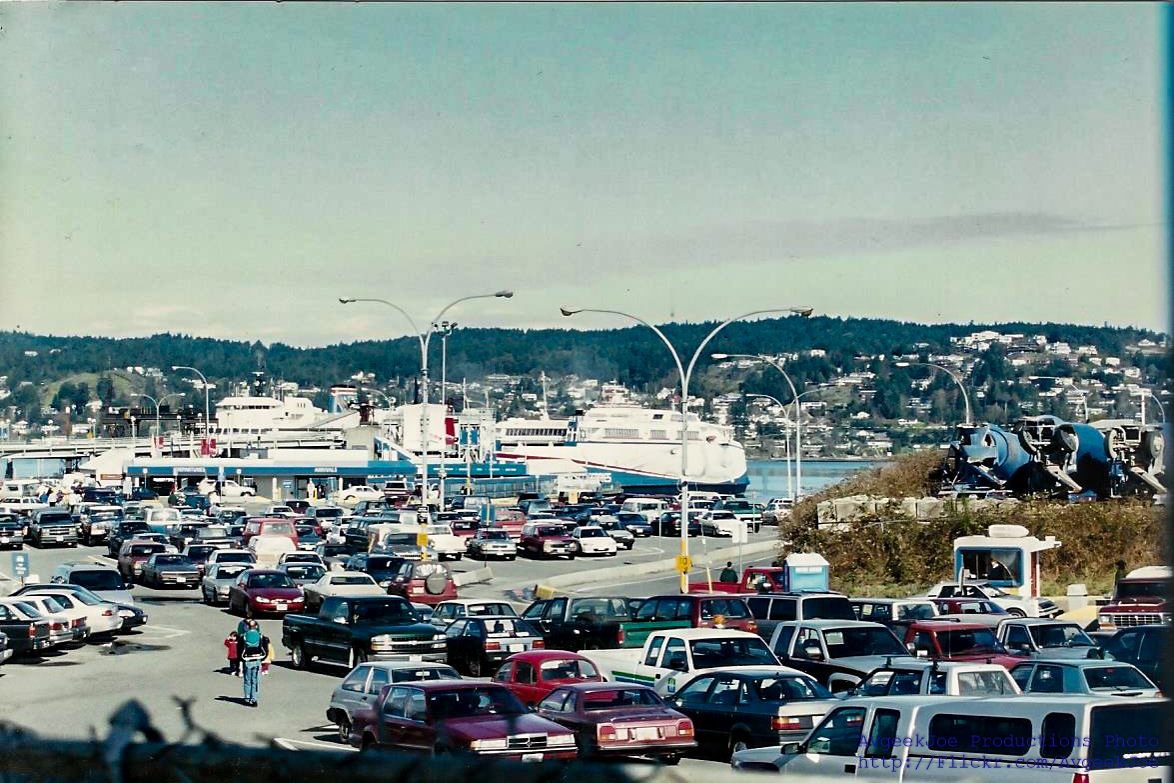
A PacifiCat (centre) taking on passengers at Departure Bay on March 19, 2000. All three PacifiCats were decommissioned shortly thereafter.

The fast ferry scandal was a political affair in the late 1990s relating to the construction of three fast ferries by the Canadian provincial crown corporation BC Ferries under direction of the Executive Council of British Columbia, headed at the time by Premier Glen Clark of the New Democratic Party.

In addition to major delays and cost overruns, the ferries never fully met their original specifications, and only operated briefly in a reduced capacity, before being auctioned off at a substantial loss by the subsequently elected BC Liberal Party government.

A review was later conducted by British Columbia Auditor General George L. Morfitt.

== High-speed ferries ==
The provincial government at the time, led by New Democratic Party (NDP) premier Glen Clark, used provincial Crown corporation BC Ferries to advance its economic goal of supporting British Columbia's shipbuilding industry by creating a fleet of custom-designed high-speed catamaran passenger/vehicle ferries for BC Ferries. The eventual goal was to use aluminum from Alcan smelted in British Columbia (BC), to create jobs building aluminum boats for the international market. The vessels were to be built by private shipyards under the overview of a new provincial Crown corporation to be called Catamaran Ferries International (CFI).

== Public goals of the fast ferry program ==
A major impetus for the project was to have BC Ferries spend locally some of the billions that needed to be spent on new ships. The development of Duke Point, the truck ferry terminal south of Nanaimo, and the new island freeway allowed the north Nanaimo ferry terminal to focus on the passenger market. Large trucks were to be banned from the north Nanaimo terminal and moved to an alternate Duke Point truck ferry.

The improvement promised was to deliver more frequent service (travel time reduced by 30 minutes), with smaller-capacity ships (250 cars vs. 365). The smaller ferries required 17 fewer staff per vessel to operate the same route, reducing operating costs.

- Less waiting traffic at Horseshoe Bay terminal as backlogs often blocked access to the Sea-to-Sky Highway.
- Fewer vehicles clogging residential streets upon each arrival of the existing ferries
- An end to noisy truck traffic in the villages of Horseshoe Bay and Departure Bay (the Horseshoe Bay terminal is at the bottom of a long, steep hill on which several fatal truck-related accidents have occurred)
- Skills and training. The $450 million fast ferry costs total includes the assistance to the ship yards to upgrade yards and build new and expand buildings, and the purchase of specialized aluminum cutters and welding equipment. Approximately 350 people received training in welding, and 250 of these welders received international certification in aluminum welding required for high speed aluminum craft.

== Political goals of the fast ferry program ==
Perhaps more important than the need for a more efficient ferry system was the NDP government's desire to rebuild and collect taxes from the shipbuilding industry of British Columbia. During the early 1900s, shipbuilding in British Columbia was at its greatest, in support of a booming fishing industry. During World War II, shipbuilding again peaked with the delivery of two 10,000-ton freighters every week. By the 1990s, however, shipbuilding in British Columbia was nearly dead due, in-part, to the ballooning cost of materials, high labour costs, labour disputes, and increasing competition from Asian shipyards.

Faced with potential collapse of the local ship building industry, the British Columbia government initiated the fast ferry program, expecting local shipbuilders could emulate the success of Australian shipbuilders such as Austal and Incat.

In the early planning stages of the project, Australian fast ferry operator Holyman, then one of the biggest and most experienced fast ferry operators in the world, was in talks with BC Ferries and the NDP government. Holyman's managing director and its global development manager met with the minister for transport and cautioned him against the BC Ferries FastCat plan. They suggested that a first time builder would find it impossible to construct the vessels on time, within budget, or within weight specification. They also suggested that the intended power would be insufficient to meet targeted speed, even if the vessels were built within weight. Finally, they suggested that the ongoing maintenance and operation of fast ferries required specialized expertise. The company offered its expertise to the government.

== PacifiCat fleet ==
The vessels built for BC Ferries were intended to improve ferry service between the mainland terminal of Horseshoe Bay (in West Vancouver) and the Vancouver Island terminal at Departure Bay (in Nanaimo).

The three vessels were built between 1998 and 2000 and were named as follows:

- PacifiCat Explorer (1998)
- PacifiCat Discovery (1999)
- PacifiCat Voyager (2000)

Technically, PacifiCat Voyager was never part of the BC Ferries fleet, as it was christened but never commissioned; by the time this vessel was ready for deployment, the bottom had already fallen out of the fast ferry program.

The vessels had a service speed of 37 knots (68 km/h) and a capacity for 250 car-equivalents and 1000 passengers. The hulls of all three vessels had slightly varying murals that depict a cougar.

Due to various oversights by the government, BC Ferries, design bureaus, and the shipyards, the cost of the program more than doubled from $210 million ($70 million/vessel) to almost $460 million ($150 million/vessel) and final delivery was almost 3 years behind schedule. As with all prototype construction this cost and build time was gradually being reduced with each successive completion. A large part of the delay was because the shipyards commissioned to construct the vessels had very little experience working with aluminum. Also design changes during construction caused delays and more costs. Previously, construction of aluminum vessels in British Columbia had been limited to fishing boats and special-purpose vessels. The construction of three dual-hulled 122.5 m catamarans represented a very large leap of faith by the government in British Columbia shipyards.

The first fastcat began service between Horseshoe Bay and Nanaimo in June 1999 and the second fastcat began operating in November 1999. The ferries had the following problems during their brief tenure:

- High fuel consumption. The four 8,375 brake horsepower (6.2 MW) engines driving their waterjets required more fuel, "up to twice that of conventional vessels". Fully loaded and traveling at top speed of 34 knots/ 63 km an hour required the engines to be used at 90% power.
- Due to an unusually wet and windy winter, there was a higher than normal amount of flotsam in the waters along the route, some of which was sucked into impellers for the ferries' engines, causing breakdowns and sailing cancellations.
- When operated at full speed, the Pacificat fleet created a wake which was reported to have damaged waterfront wharves and property in coastal areas near the two terminals. This required that the ferries reduce speed in certain areas and alter course in others, reducing their speed advantage.
- The air on vehicle decks became uncomfortably warm, either from the heat of the vessel engines or lack of air circulation. This made some people wary of bringing pets aboard the FastCats; however, the ferries had kennels with improved air circulation at the bow and stern of the vehicle decks.
- There was little outside deck space for passengers. The existing ferries had large decks, and it was common for passengers to spend the entire sailing circling the decks of the ship or sunbathing on the lifejacket containers.
- The ships had interiors that were perceived by passengers as being cramped compared to the existing ferries.
- Loading took longer than the older ferries due to balancing issues. This further negated the ships' speed advantage.

After a change in leadership, the new premier of BC, Ujjal Dosanjh, placed the ferries up for sale. A subsequent election virtually eliminated the New Democratic Party from the legislature, and Gordon Campbell of the BC Liberals auctioned off the PacifiCat fleet on March 24, 2003, for $19.4 million ($6.5 million/vessel) to Washington Marine Group. Further controversy erupted when it was revealed that the same company, which is a prominent financial backer of the Liberal Party, had offered $60 million for the vessels prior to the auction, on the condition that BC would then rent the ferries. Some claimed the aluminum ships were worth more as scrap. Others said Indonesians were prepared to pay as much as $88 million.

== Projected uses ==
In September 2005, the media reported that the Washington Marine Group had expressed interest in operating a fast ferry service from Downtown Vancouver to a point on Vancouver Island. When questioned, representatives of WMG indicated that they are actively searching for suitable applications for the Fast Ferries and they would not rule out such a service.

On December 16, 2005, WMG confirmed that it was considering putting the ferries into service from North Vancouver to Duke Point (near Nanaimo) to compete with the BC Ferries routes. WMG at one point said they intended to make a decision by the spring of 2006.

As of July 2009 the ferries had been sold for use in the United Arab Emirates. They were later found tied up in the port of Alexandria, Egypt in late 2022.

In January 2024, the ferries were listed for sale on Facebook Marketplace by an Egyptian company that was planning to scrap them if they went unsold.

In October 2026 it was reported that all three ferries are being scrapped and recycled in two Egyptian ports east of Alexandria, Abuqir and Idku, by Fast Marine Technology for its client International Technology for Chemical Industries.

== Primary factors for project failure ==
The primary factor for the project failure was the overall cost of building three fast ferries being substantially more than advertised at the outset of the project in 1994, when it was projected to cost $210 million.

The press called BC Auditor General Morfitt's comments perhaps the most damning report the BC Auditor General's office has ever issued. His report stated significant breakdowns in governance and project management were major factors in the failure of the fast ferry project. These breakdowns were identified as follows in Morfitt's report:

Governance:

- The Ministry of Transportation and Highways was involved in the project to the point where, at times, board decisions were forced under directives rather than a result of due diligence.
- During the project, the BC Ferries’ subsidiary Catamaran Ferries International (CFI) board, responsible for managing the project, was replaced in its entirety without just cause in order to allow for more representation by B.C. Ferries. This action appeared to be a misunderstanding of good practice.
- During the project, the chief executive officer for CFI, Tom Ward, also held the same position at BC Ferries. By representing both the constructor and the future owner and operator of the fast ferries, it made it difficult to objectively report on progress without implicating himself in almost every aspect of the project. Thus, little or wrong information was available throughout the project.
- Little or no research was completed to establish the contributing factors that led to the decline of B.C.’s shipbuilding industry. Information on current infrastructure, competencies and viable partnerships was not analyzed.
- Despite opportunities, careful re-evaluation of the project was not undertaken.
- No clear reporting structure or government expectations existed to guide the project.
- BC Ferries had initially recommended that a comparable ferry be leased for trials in coastal waters, but the government decided to forego testing and committed to the construction project, regardless.

Project management:

- A risk analysis was not completed prior to the decision to proceed being made.
- The approved budget and timeline was established for the project without research and prior to the completion of design specifications or selection of contractor.
- The fast ferry business plan was not completed prior to project commencement due to the rushed nature of the project.
- Time and cost was poorly managed due to the inability to secure a fixed-cost contract with an experienced supplier.

The auditor general report was later criticized in a Legislative standing committee by MLA Rick Kasper for ignoring and not accounting the benefits to BC and Canada in income taxes etc. from building the ships in BC.
