= Marion McDougall =

Canadian politician, philanthropist and relief worker

Ottawa Public School Trustee Serving with Charles Macnab (1919) and Herbert James Oliver (1920)
- In office 1919–1920
- Succeeded by: James E. McClenaghan
- Constituency: Dalhousie Ward

Personal details
- Born: December 29, 1851 Burnstown, Canada East
- Died: August 18, 1927 (aged 75) Ottawa
- Spouse: John Lorn McDougall (m. 1870; d. 1909)
- Children: 11

Marion Eliza King McDougall, née Morris (December 29, 1851 – August 18, 1927) was a Canadian politician, philanthropist and relief worker. She was the first woman to be elected in the city of Ottawa, Ontario, Canada.

McDougall was born in Burnstown, Ontario (then Canada East), the daughter of Peter Morris and Helen Bailey. The Morris family was a prominent pioneer family in Renfrew County. Her grandfather was the first registrar of the county, and her uncle was the first sheriff. Her family moved to Ottawa when she was about 9 years old.

During her life, she served as president of the Ottawa Historical Society, director of the Maternity Hospital board, and was a member of the board of management of the Elizabeth Residence for indigent women. A keen gardener, she won many awards at the Lady Grey horticultural exhibition. During World War I, she was active in the recruitment effort and with the Red Cross. She also headed the Belgian relief war work, and was decorated with a medal of honour by the Queen of Belgium.

McDougall was elected to Ottawa's Public School Board in the 1919 Ottawa municipal election for a two-year term. She was one of three female candidates running for school board in that election, and the only one elected. She won by a majority of 115 votes over her nearest opponent, J. E. McClenaghan. Upon taking her seat, her presence on the board was met with apparent applause by her male colleagues. The board's newly elected chair, R. W. Hamilton stated "I don't think it will hurt the board... to have more women on it ... I think there should be two or three." While on the school board, she was elected to two committees. She did not run for re-election in 1921.

She died of heart failure in her sleep in 1927 at her home, 230 Chapel Street in Ottawa's Sandy Hill neighbourhood. She had been suffering from recent heart attacks. Her funeral was held at her daughter's residence at 292 Daly Avenue, and her body was interred at Beechwood Cemetery.

== Personal life ==
She was married to John Lorn McDougall, who served as Auditor General of Canada from 1878 to 1905. She was an active member of St. Andrew's Presbyterian Church.
