= Karen Hogan =

Canadian government official

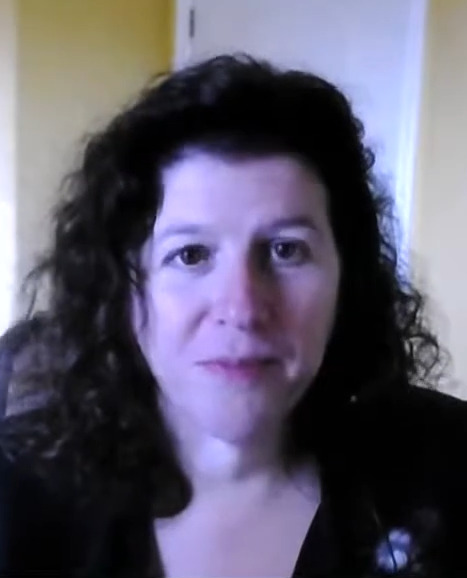
- Hogan in 2020

15th Auditor General of Canada
- Incumbent
- Assumed office June 20, 2020
- Prime Minister: Justin Trudeau; Mark Carney
- Preceded by: Sylvain Ricard

Personal details
- Children: 2
- Education: Concordia University

Karen Hogan is a Canadian civil servant who has served as the Auditor General of Canada since 2020.

== Early life and education ==
Hogan holds both a Bachelor's and a graduate diploma in accounting from Concordia University in Montreal.

== Career ==
Hogan has served in various corporate jobs including with the Montreal office of Ernst & Young and as a Senior Accounting manager for Canada Post in Ottawa. Hogan is a member of the Chartered Professional Accountants of Ontario as well as the Ordre des comptables professionnels agréés du Québec.

Hogan joined the Office of the Auditor General of Canada in 2006.

Hogan was appointed as Assistant Auditor General of Canada in January 2019.

In June 2020, she was appointed as Auditor General. Hogan succeeds Sylvain Richard who had been acting in the role since the death of the previous Auditor General Michael Ferguson in 2019.

Government offices
Preceded by Sylvain Ricard	Auditor General of Canada; 2020-present	Succeeded by incumbent
