= Auditor General of Canada =

Canadian government accountability agency

- La vérificatrice générale du Canada
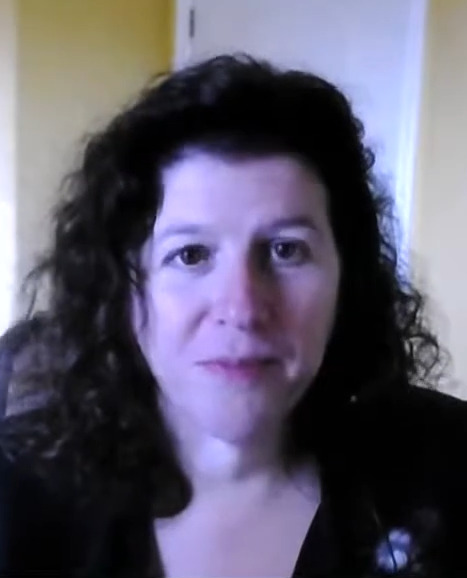
- Incumbent; Karen Hogan since June 3, 2020
- Abbreviation: OAG
- Reports to: Parliament of Canada
- Nominator: Prime Minister of Canada
- Appointer: Governor in Council
- Term length: 10 years; non-renewable
- Constituting instrument: Auditor General Act
- First holder: John Langton
- Salary: $334,500/year (Equal to that of a Puisne judge of the Supreme Court of Canada)
- Website: www.oag-bvg.gc.ca

Office of the Auditor General of Canada
- Bureau du verificauteur general du Canada

Agency overview
- Formed: 1878
- Headquarters: C.D. Howe Building, Ottawa, Ontario, Canada
- Employees: 552
- Annual budget: $88 million (2019)

The auditor general of Canada (French: La vérificatrice générale du Canada (Note: Is called Le vérificateur général du Canada when a man is holding the position)) is a supreme audit institution which acts as an officer to the Parliament of Canada tasked with highlighting accountability and oversight by conducting independent financial audits of federal government's operations. These performance audits, known as the Auditor-General's Report, provide members of parliament with objective evidence to help them examine the government's activities and hold it to account and improve good governance among public officers included.

Karen Hogan was appointed Auditor General of Canada in June 2020. She replaced interim Auditor General of Canada Sylvain Ricard.

== Office ==
Auditors general are appointed by the governor general in council (cabinet) on advice of the House of Commons and Senate for a non-renewable term of ten years. An auditor general may only be removed for cause by the governor-in-council with the approval of both the House of Commons and Senate. The Oversight and Accountability (the Federal Accountability Act) and Auditor General Act gives this body substantial independence from both cabinet and Head of Government control.

The auditor general's responsibilities include:

- auditing operations of the federal and territorial governments
- providing Parliament and the legislative assemblies with independent information, assurance, and advice regarding the stewardship of public funds

On November 4, 2011, the prime minister appointed Michael Ferguson, former auditor general of the province of New Brunswick, as Auditor General of Canada, effective November 28, 2011. Sylvain Ricard, having been previously the deputy auditor general, was appointed by Prime Minister Justin Trudeau on March 29, 2019, to serve until a permanent replacement was selected.

The Office of the Auditor General of Canada was named one of "Canada's Top 100 Employers" by Mediacorp Canada Inc. five years in a row (2008–2012), and was featured in Maclean's news magazine.

The commissioner of the environment and sustainable development, was created by Parliament in 1995 as an aide to the AGC, and has offices within the precinct of the AGC. The commissioner is empowered under the 1995 amendments to the Auditor-General Act to receive "petitions on environmental and sustainable development matters and [to] require ministers to respond to them". The petition process requires the ministry to respond in 120 days, although the process may be delayed by litigation.

The Office of the Auditor General of Canada is located in the C.D. Howe Building in Ottawa.

== History ==
Auditor General Act

Parliament of Canada
- Long title: An Act respecting the office of the Auditor General of Canada and sustainable development monitoring and reporting
- Citation: Auditor General Act (R.S.C., 1985, c. A-17)
- Enacted by: Parliament of Canada
- Assented to: 1985

The role of auditor general was introduced in 1878 and prior to the creation it was the head of the audit board (1867–1878).

In 1971, the auditor general's office hosted VII INCOSAI, the seventh triennial convention of the International Organization of Supreme Audit Institutions.

The Auditor General Act underpins the office as an independent official.

=== List of auditors general of Canada ===
Auditor general	Appointed	Departed
John Langton (Note: Held the position as Head of the Audit Board)	1867	1878
John Lorn McDougall	1878	1905
John Fraser	1905	1919
Edward Davenport Sutherland	1919	1923
Georges Gonthier	1924	1939
Robert Watson Sellar	1940	1959
Andrew Maxwell Henderson	1960	1973
James J. Macdonell	1973	1980
Michael H. Rayner (Note: Acting)	1980	1981
Kenneth M. Dye	1981	1991
Denis Desautels	1991	2001
Sheila Fraser	2001	2011
John Wiersema (Note: Interim)	2011	2011
Michael Ferguson	2011	2019
Sylvain Ricard (Note: Interim)	2019	2020
Karen Hogan	2020	Incumbent

== Affiliations and membership(s) ==
- Association des Institutions Supérieures de Contrôle Ayant en Commun l'usage du français (AISCCUF)
- The Commonwealth AG Conference (Participant)
- The Panel of External Auditors of the United Nations (Observer)

== See also ==
- Court of Accounts
- Court of Audit
- Parliament of Canada
- Auditor(s) General of the provinces and territories
  - British Columbia
  - Manitoba
  - Newfoundland and Labrador
  - Nova Scotia
  - Ontario
  - Quebec
