= Morfitt =

Morfitt is a surname. Notable people with the surname include:

- Darren Morfitt (born 1973), English actor
- Garry Moore (1915–1993), born Thomas Garrison Morfit, American entertainer
- George L. Morfitt (auditor general), Canadian squash player, public servant, and businessman
- Jack Morfitt (1908–1973), English footballer
- Samuel Morfitt (1868–1954), English rugby player
