= 1919 Ottawa municipal election =

The city of Ottawa, Canada held municipal elections on January 6, 1919 to elect members of the 1919 Ottawa City Council.

The election saw a woman elected in the city for the first time, with Marion McDougall (wife of the late John Lorn McDougall) being elected as a public school trustee in Dalhousie Ward.

== Mayor of Ottawa ==
Fisher won seven of the city's nine wards, while Parent won the city's two francophone wards, By and Ottawa.

Candidate	Votes	%
Harold Fisher	7,624	62.16
Rufus H. Parent	4,642	37.84

== Plebiscites ==
Ottawa Electric Railway to be taken over and run by a commission before 1923.
Option	Votes	%
Yes	8,234	75.31
No	2,700	24.69

Ottawa Electric Railway to be taken over and run by a commission in 1923.
Option	Votes	%
Yes	8,771	79.12
No	2,314	20.88

Ottawa Electric Railway to be taken over and run by a commission.
Option	Votes	%
Yes	8,943	81.65
No	2,010	18.35

By-law to provide for an expenditure of $150,000 on a bridge of the Rideau Canal at Somerset Street
Option	Votes	%
Yes	2,658	50.08
No	2,649	49.92

The plebiscite lost in all but three wards, but won St. George Ward (which the bridge would connect with Downtown) by a large enough margin to pass city-wide by just nine votes. Despite the result, a bridge would not be built at that location until the Corktown Footbridge was built in 2006.

By-law to secure authority to expend $150,000 on the establishment and maintenance of a civic coal yard
Option	Votes	%
Against	3,161	59.73
For	2,163	40.63

== Ottawa Board of Control ==
(4 elected)

Candidate	Votes	%
Frank H. Plant	6,666	18.54
Joseph Kent	6,501	18.08
Napoléon Champagne	6,206	17.26
J. W. Nelson	5,298	14.74
James Muir	5,229	14.55
Thomas Brethour	4,985	13.87
Peter Glavey	1,062	2.95

== Ottawa City Council ==
(2 elected from each ward)

Rideau Ward
Candidate	Votes	%
Douglas H. Macdonald	352	33.78
Breary Slinn	285	27.35
William Cherry	206	19.77
Daudelin	199	19.10

By Ward
Candidate	Votes	%
Edward Gaulin	652	37.86
Fred Desjardins	613	35.60
Labelle	457	26.54

St. George Ward
Candidate	Votes	%
Walter Cunningham
Wilfrid J. Grace

Wellington Ward
Candidate	Votes	%
James D. Denny
Charles R. Stephen

Capital Ward
Candidate	Votes	%
Arthur R. Ford	1,417	35.35
William Y. Denison	1,094	27.30
McCormick	848	21.16
Walsh	649	16.19

Dalhousie Ward
Candidate	Votes	%
John P. Balharrie	1,181	31.82
James A. Forward	944	25.44
O'Meara	671	18.08
Pelletier	572	15.41
Hunt	343	9.24

Victoria Ward
Candidate	Votes	%
Ernest Laroche	Acclaimed	
David Rice	Acclaimed	

Ottawa Ward
Candidate	Votes	%
Joseph Albert Pinard	850	36.39
Waldo Guertin	633	27.10
Bordeleau	476	20.38
Beauregard	377	16.14

Central Ward
Candidate	Votes	%
John F. McKinley	Acclaimed	
Charles Pepper	Acclaimed	
