= AGBC =

AGBC may refer to:

- Attorney General of British Columbia
- Auditor General of British Columbia
