= Auditor General of Nova Scotia =

Canadian government accountability agency

- Le vérificateur général de la Nouvelle-Écosse
- Incumbent; Kim Adair since May 3, 2021
- Abbreviation: NSOAG
- Reports to: Nova Scotia House of Assembly
- Appointer: Governor in Council
- Term length: 10 years non-renewable
- Constituting instrument: Auditor General Act
- Salary: $199,566 CAD (Equivalent to the midpoint of the payscale of a Deputy Minister)

Office of the Auditor General of Nova Scotia
- Bureau du vérificateur général de la Nouvelle-Écosse

Agency overview
- Formed: 1958
- Headquarters: Halifax, Nova Scotia, Canada
- Employees: 34
- Annual budget: $3.8 million (2018)
- Website: https://oag-ns.ca/

The auditor general of Nova Scotia is an officer of the Nova Scotia House of Assembly to aid accountability and oversight by conducting independent financial audits of provincial government operations. These audits provide members of the House of the Assembly and the public with objective evidence to help them examine the government's activities and hold it to account.

Kim Adair is the auditor general of Nova Scotia, as of May 3, 2021. She replaced Michael Pickup who became Auditor General of British Columbia.

== Office ==
Auditors general are appointed by the governor-in-Council and confirmed by a vote in the Nova Scotia House of Assembly.

The auditor general's responsibilities include:

- auditing operations of the provincial government as well as crown corporations
- auditing operations of any organization that has received funding from a provincial entity
- auditing operations of any contractor delivering service on behalf of the government or a government entity

== History ==
The original role of Provincial auditor was created in 1909 as an act of the House of Assembly. This role last until 1926 until the position was abolished and replaced by a chartered public accountant appointed on an annual basis by the government.

In 1942 the role was re-established as part of the Department of the Provincial Treasurer. In 1950, the Provincial auditor was given the powers of a public inquiry commissioner.

The modern role was formed in 1958. The position was renamed to the auditor general and made an independent officer of the Legislature.

In 2005 the auditor general confirmation process was made subject to a majority vote of the House of Assembly and the term of each appointment was limited to a ten-year non-renewable term.

== List of auditors general of Nova Scotia ==
Auditor General	Appointed	Departed
L. Earl Peverill	1958	1965
AW Sarty	1965	1983
O. Paul Cormier	1984	1991
E. Roy Salmon	1992	2006
Jacques Lapointe	2006	2014
Michael Pickup	2014	2020
Terry Spicer	2020	2021
Kim Adair	2021	Present

== See also ==
- Auditor General of British Columbia
