= Zenon Mróz =

Polish engineer (born 1930)

- Born: 2 November 1930 (age 95); Suchowola, Second Polish Republic
- Education: Warsaw University of Technology
- Awards: Koiter Medal (2004); Order of Polonia Restituta (2001)
- Scientific career
- Fields: materials science; soil mechanics
- Workplaces: Polish Academy of Sciences

Zenon Mróz (pronounced: [mruz]; born 2 November 1930) is a Polish engineer, a member of the Polish Academy of Sciences (PAN) and the Polish Academy of Learning (PAU). He specializes in soil mechanics and materials science.

== Life and career ==
Mróz graduated from the Warsaw University of Technology in 1952. He joined the Institute of Fundamental Technological Research of the Polish Academy of Sciences in 1956. Between 1959 and 1960, he was a post-doctoral research fellow at Brown University where he collaborated with William Prager. He obtained his habilitation in 1964 for research on constitutive models of plastic deformation.

He was awarded the title of Professor of Technical Sciences in 1971. In 1986, he became a corresponding member of the Polish Academy of Sciences and in 2004, he became a full member of the organization.

== Awards and honours ==
Mróz received honorary degrees from the University of Miskolc (1995), Faculté polytechnique de Mons (1997), Cracow University of Technology (1997), University of Waterloo (1999) and University of Minnesota (2003). He also became an honorary member of the Hungarian Academy of Sciences (2003).

In 2001, he became a recipient of the Officer's Cross of the Order of Polonia Restituta.

In 2004, he was awarded the Koiter Medal of the American Society of Mechanical Engineers "for significant contributions to elastic/plastic material behavior modeling, to tribology, and to optimization".

== Selected publications ==
- Effect of Grain Roughness on Strength, Volume Changes, Elastic and Dissipated Energies During Quasi-Static Homogeneous Triaxial Compression Using DEM (with Jan Kozicki, Jacek Tejchman-Konarzewski, 2012)
- Topological sensitivity analysisand finite topology modifications: application to optimization of plates in bending (with Dariusz Bojczuk, 2009)
- Variational approach to the analysis of steady state thermoelastic wear regimes in International Journal for Numerical Methods in Engineering (with I. Paczelt, 2009)
- An energy model of segmentation cracking of thin films in Mechanics of Materials, Elsevier Science (with Marcin Białas, 2007)
- A simplified analysis of interface failure under compressive normal stress and monotonic or cyclic shear loading in International Journal for Numerical and Analytical Methods in Geomechanics (with Marcian Białas, 2005)

== See also ==
- List of Polish engineers
- Timeline of Polish science and technology
- List of University of Waterloo honorary degree recipients
