= Robert Ker (auditor general) =

British colonial administrator

Robert Ker (August 14, 1824 – 12 February 1879) was the first Auditor General of the British colonies, which later became the Canadian province of British Columbia.

Ker was born in Dalkeith and educated in Scotland. He was born into "a family long prominent on the Scottish border", a descendant of the Dukes of Roxburghe and cousin of Allan Ebenezer Ker. He came to British Columbia from Scotland in 1859 for the gold rush but he quickly went into government service. He was friendly with colonial governor Sir James Douglas and John Sebastian Helmcken. Ker was the auditor general of the first Colony of British Columbia and also acted as auditor general of the Colony of Vancouver Island. When the two colonies united in 1866, he continued in the position of auditor general. He served as Auditor General for the province of British Columbia between 1867 and 1879.

Upon Canadian Confederation in 1867, he was appointed to the position of Dominion paymaster general. He died in Victoria, British Columbia of exposure during a snowstorm.

The Ker Memorial Wing of the Art Gallery of Greater Victoria is named in his honour.

In 2009 the Ker Family celebrated its 150th anniversary in British Columbia.
