= John Wiersema =

Canadian government official (1955–2018)

Auditor General of Canada
- In office May 31, 2011 – November 27, 2011
- Preceded by: Sheila Fraser
- Succeeded by: Michael Ferguson

Personal details
- Born: John Edward Wiersema; July 6, 1955 Winnipeg, Manitoba, Canada
- Died: March 11, 2018 (aged 62) Ottawa, Ontario, Canada
- Education: Carleton University

John Edward Wiersema (July 6, 1955 – March 11, 2018) was the interim Auditor General of Canada. He was appointed in May 2011 by prime minister Stephen Harper for a mandate of six months after Sheila Fraser retired from the position.

Prior to his appointment, Wiersema was Deputy Auditor General.

Wiersema was born in Winnipeg, graduated from Carleton University in Commerce and became an accountant in 1981. He married Marilyn Cassie Hut in 1979 and died in Ottawa on March 11, 2018, at the age of 62.

Government offices
Preceded by Sheila Fraser	Auditor General of Canada; 2011	Succeeded by Michael Ferguson
