= Suchowola =

Town in Poland

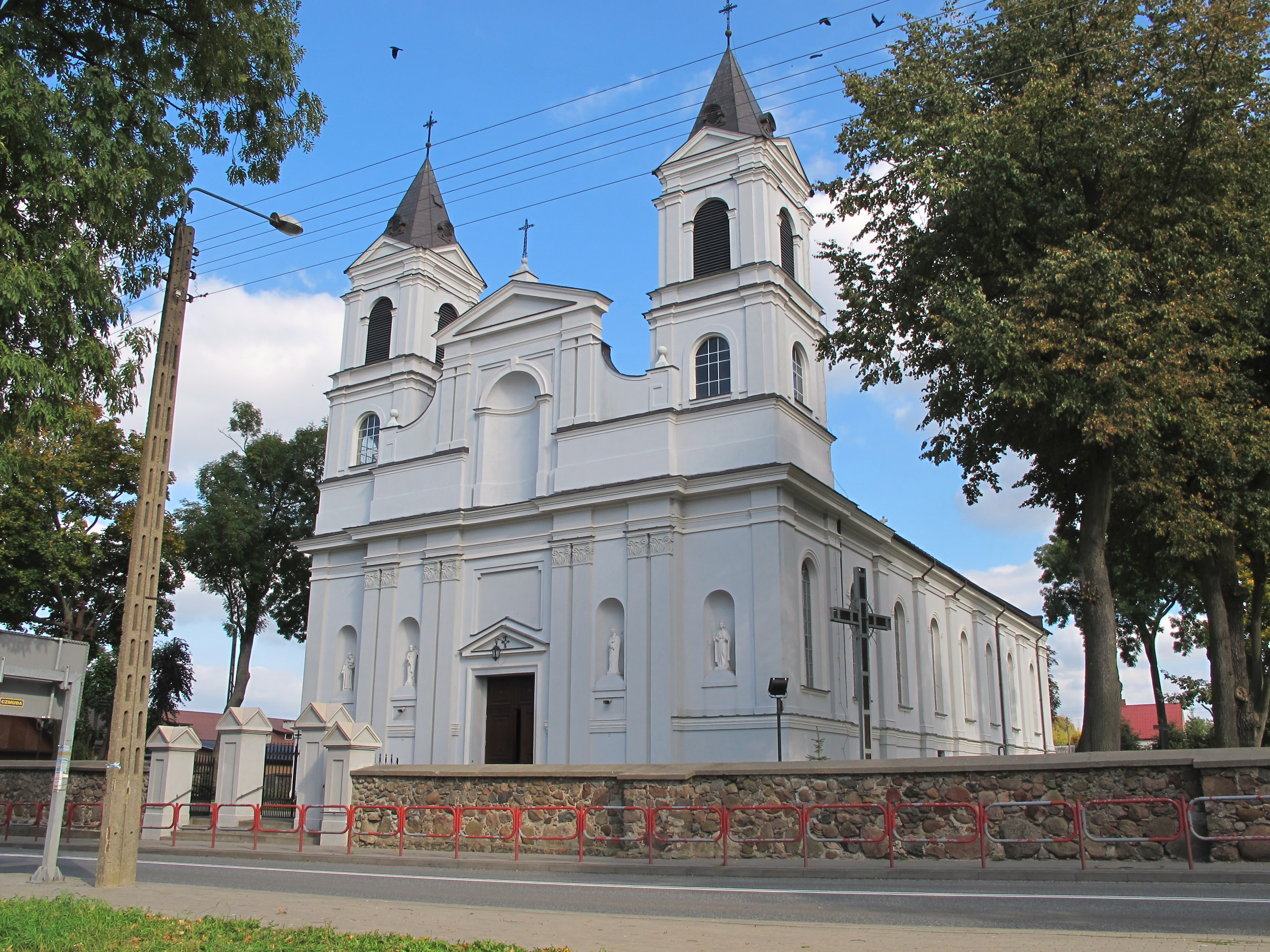
- Church of Saints Peter and Paul in Suchowola

- Coat of arms

- Location within Poland
- Coordinates: 53°34′36″N 23°6′6″E
- Country: Poland
- Voivodeship: Podlaskie
- County: Sokółka
- Gmina: Suchowola
- Founded: 16th century
- Town rights: 1777

Area
  - Total: 25.95 km^{2} (10.02 sq mi)

Population (2010)
  - Total: 2,186
  - Density: 84.24/km^{2} (218.2/sq mi)
- Time zone: UTC+1 (CET)
  - Summer (DST): UTC+2 (CEST)
- Postal code: 16-150
- Vehicle registration: BSK
- Website: http://www.suchowola.com.pl

Suchowola ([suxɔˈvɔla] (Note: Lithuanian: Suchovola, Belarusian: Сухаволя Suchavolja) is a town in north-eastern Poland in Sokółka County in the Podlaskie Voivodeship, located on both banks of the Olszanka River. Its population is 2,196 (2017).

== History ==
Suchowola was founded in the 16th century and in 1777 it was granted town rights. It is a former Polish royal town. In 1775, royal astronomer Szymon Antoni Sobiekrajski published a report in which he stated that Suchowola is the exact geographic centre of Europe.

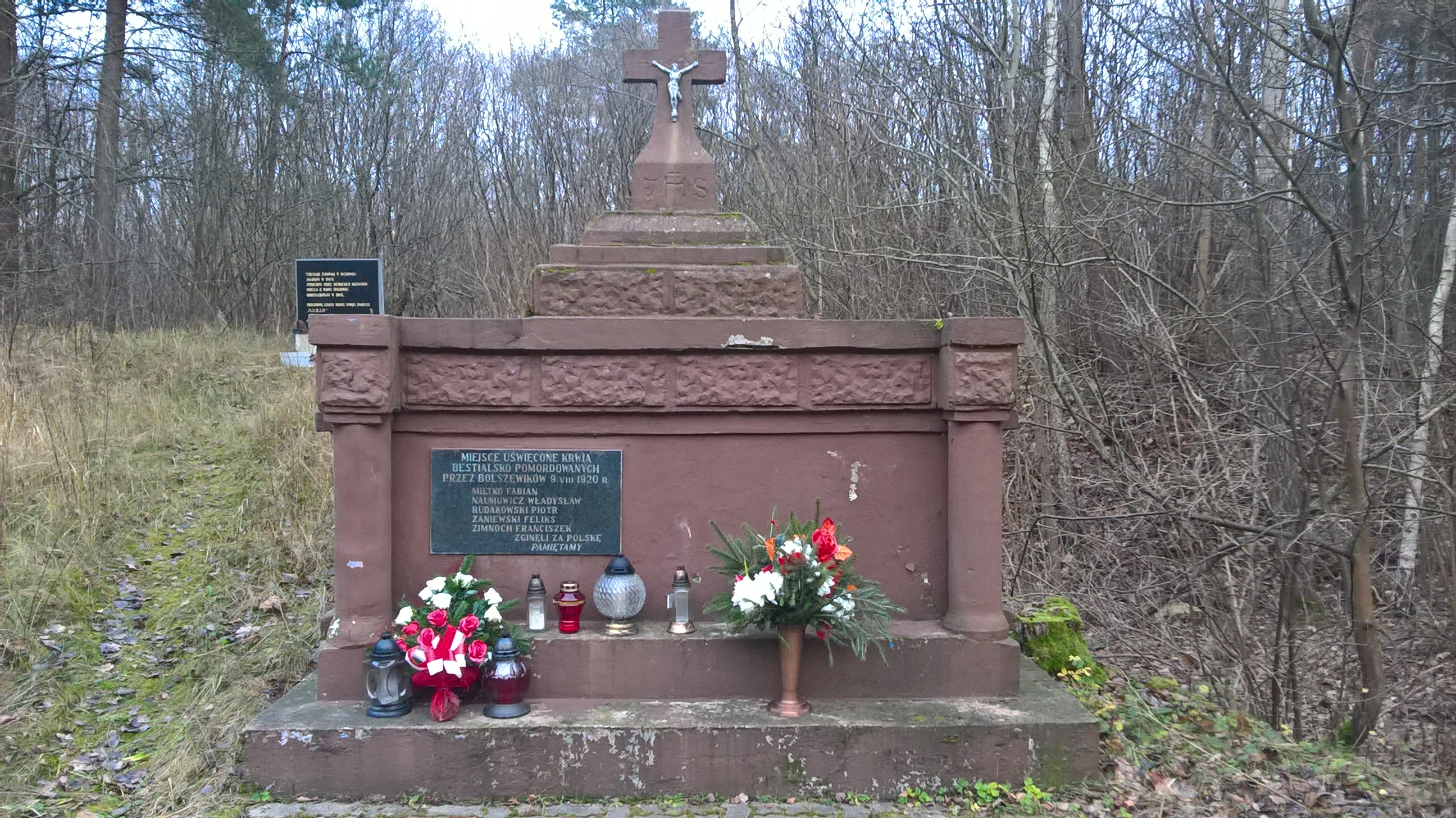
Memorial at the site of a Soviet massacre of Poles from 1920

During the Polish–Soviet War, the invading Soviets murdered five Poles in Suchowola on August 9, 1920.

Following the joint German-Soviet invasion of Poland, which started World War II in September 1939, the town was initially occupied by the Soviet Union. At the beginning of the war, the town's population was about 3,000, about 1,500 of whom were Jewish. Several Poles who worked or lived in pre-war Suchowola were murdered by the Russians in the large Katyn massacre in 1940.

In June 1941, the town passed under German occupation, and an auxiliary Polish police force recruited. The SS in conjunction with the Polish police and some local Poles, brutalized, raped, robbed, and murdered Jews with impunity throughout July. On one occasion, Jews were driven into a pond and beaten until several drowned. Dozens of Jews were burned alive after the Polish police and SS drove them into a house and setting it on fire. Visiting German dignitaries watched and took photographs of the violence. Later in July, the Germans established a ghetto, which was seriously overcrowded and without adequate water. Jews from neighboring villages were brought to the ghetto over the next few months. The Poles and Germans robbed and beat the Jews as they entered the ghetto. To try to make the ghetto livable, and to combat starvation and disease, the Jewish population established a bakery, planted vegetable gardens, opened a medical clinic and pharmacy, and mandated periodic baths in a public bathhouse.

In November 1942, the Polish and German police rounded up the Jews in the ghetto. The sick and elderly were shot there. Others were loaded onto horse drawn carts or made to walk 34 miles to a transit camp in Kiełbasin, south of Grodno. Though most Jews in the transit camp were sent to Treblinka or Auschwitz, Suchowola's Jews were sent to the Grodno ghetto in December. Many Jews died there after contracting diseases in the transit camp. A few Suchowola Jews were able to escape and were sheltered by local Poles. There are thought to have been 23 Jewish survivors from Suchowola. Though several Polish auxiliary policemen were charged and tried for war crimes, both against Jews and Christians, after initial convictions, they were let off in the Polish postwar trials.

After German occupation ended, the town was restored to Poland, although with a Soviet-installed communist regime, which stayed in power until the Fall of Communism in the 1980s. The Polish anti-communist resistance was active in Suchowola, and in 1945 it raided a local communist police station.

Due to serious losses in population during World War II, namely the entire Jewish population and some Poles who also lost their lives, the rights of a town were halted in 1950. On January 1, 1997, Suchowola became a town again. Polish priest Jerzy Popiełuszko, who was born in the nearby village of Okopy, was baptized in the local Church of Saints Peter and Paul. He also attended school in Suchowola. Currently, the municipal park by the church bears his name. His monument is located in the park, and in the town there is also a small museum dedicated to him.

Other sights include the historic Church of Saints Peter and Paul, and a boulder symbolizing the geographic centre of Europe, located in the municipal park.

== Transport ==
National road 8 bypasses Suchowola to the east.

Vovoideship road 670 bypasses Suchowola to the north.

The nearest railway station is in Dąbrowa Białystocka.

== Demographics ==
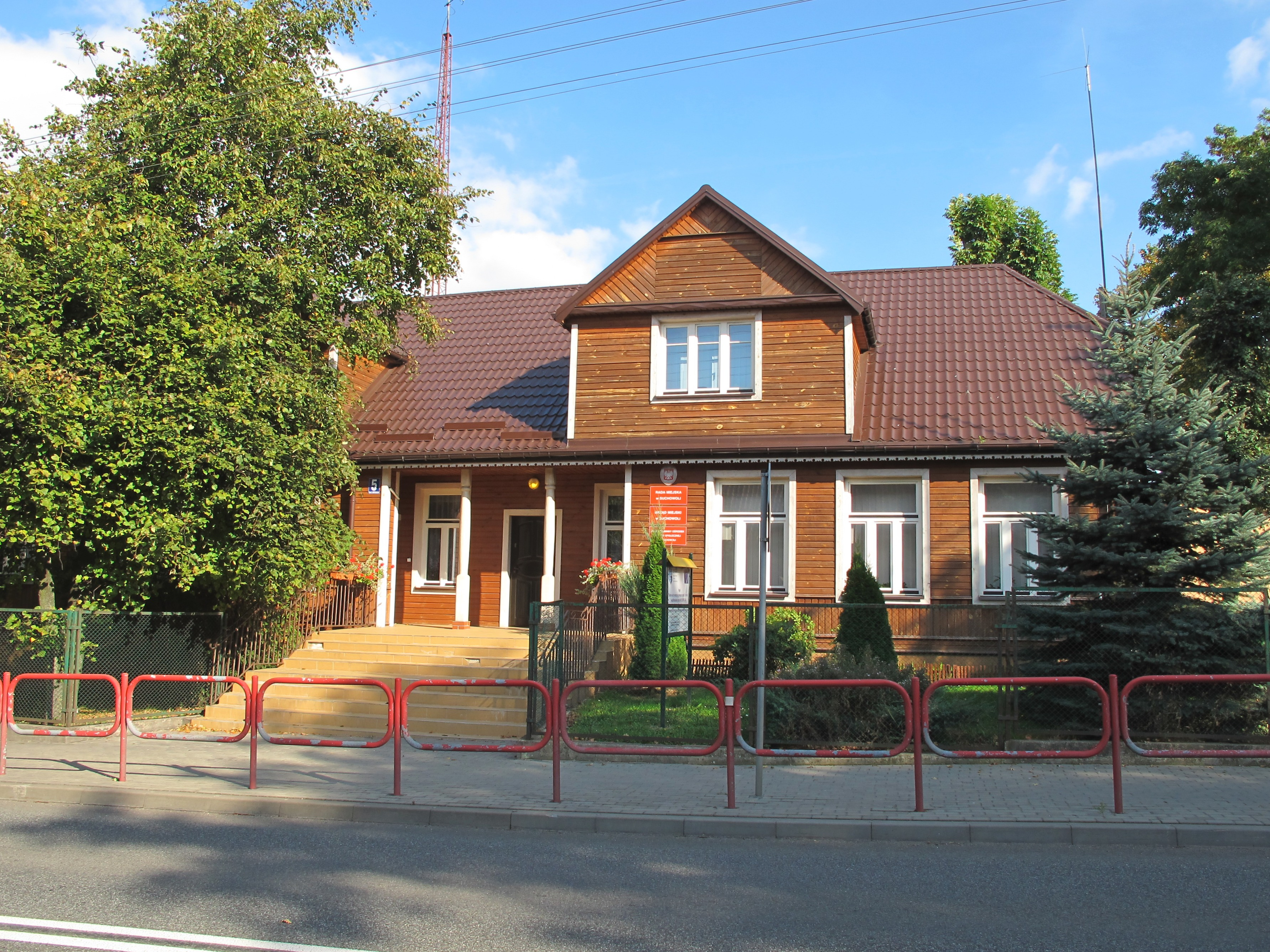
Town hall in Suchowola

Historical population

Year	Pop.	±%
1897	3,202	—
1910	3,411	+6.5%
1921	2,457	−28.0%

Year	Pop.	±%
1931	2,833	+15.3%
1939	3,000	+5.9%
2010	2,186	−27.1%

== Cuisine ==
The officially protected traditional food from Suchowola is sękacz z Suchowoli, a local type of sękacz, a traditional cake of north-eastern Poland (as designated by the Ministry of Agriculture and Rural Development of Poland).

== Gallery ==
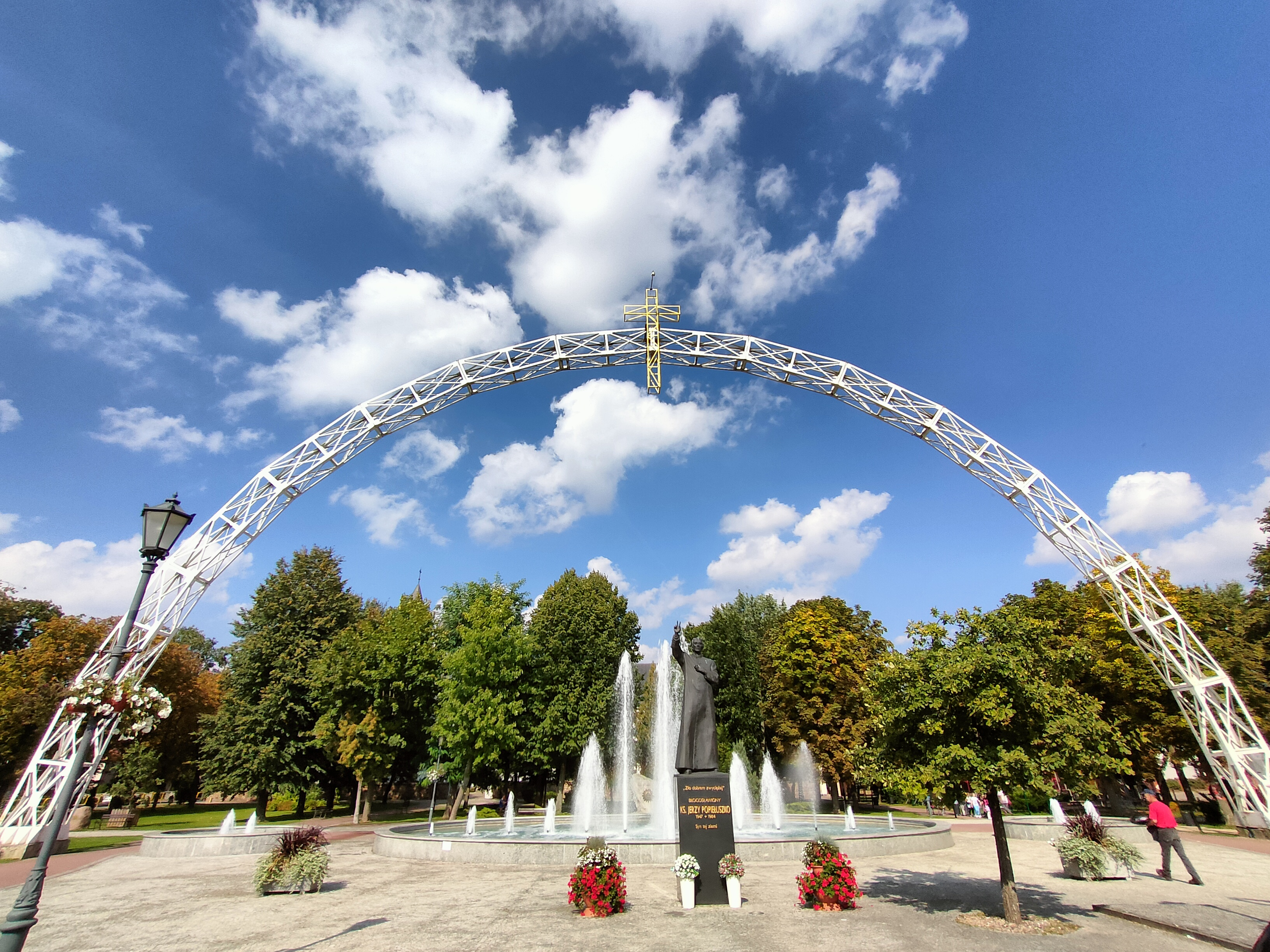
Municipal park and Papal Arch

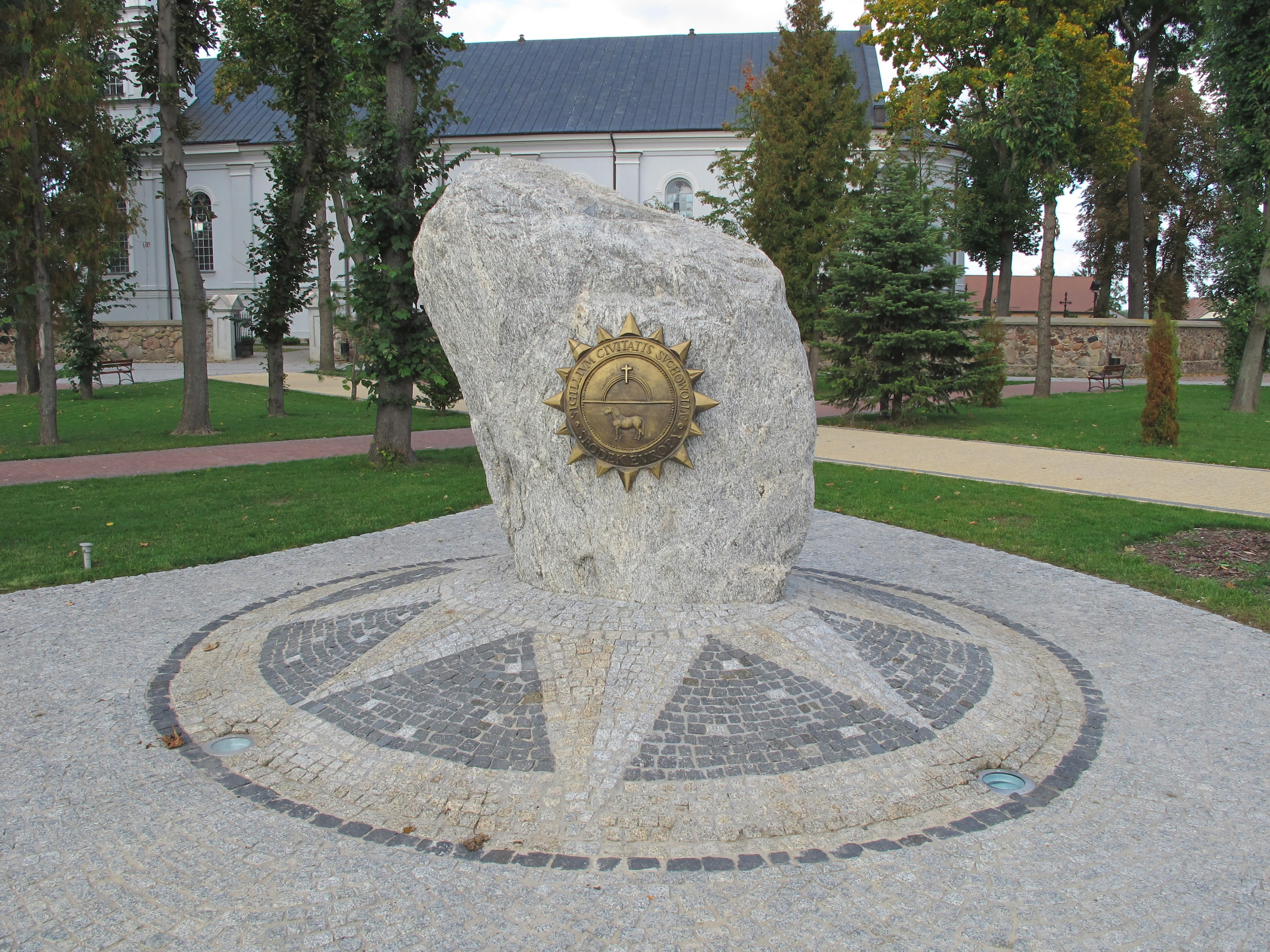
Geographic centre of Europe boulder in the park

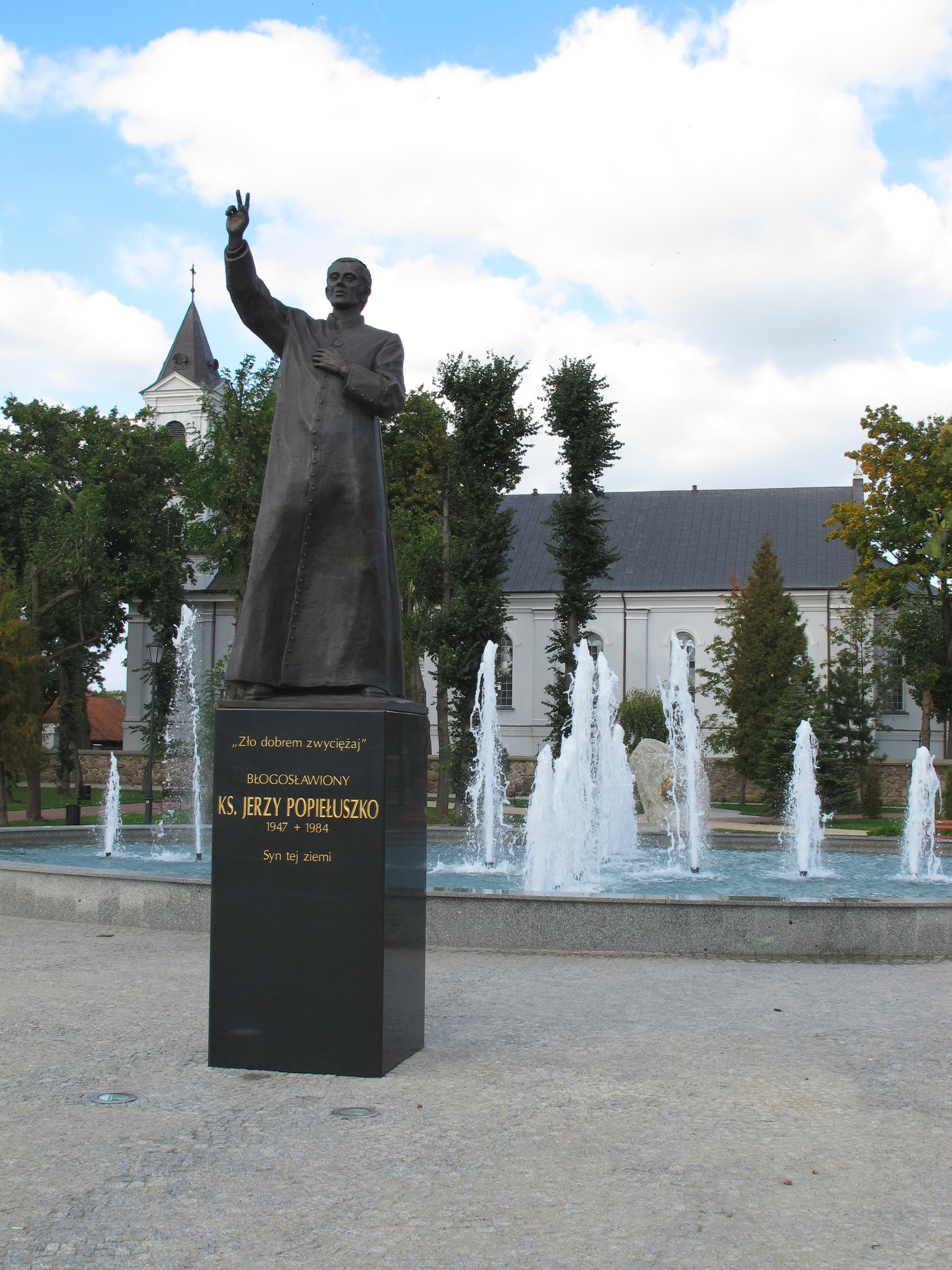
Jerzy Popiełuszko monument in the park

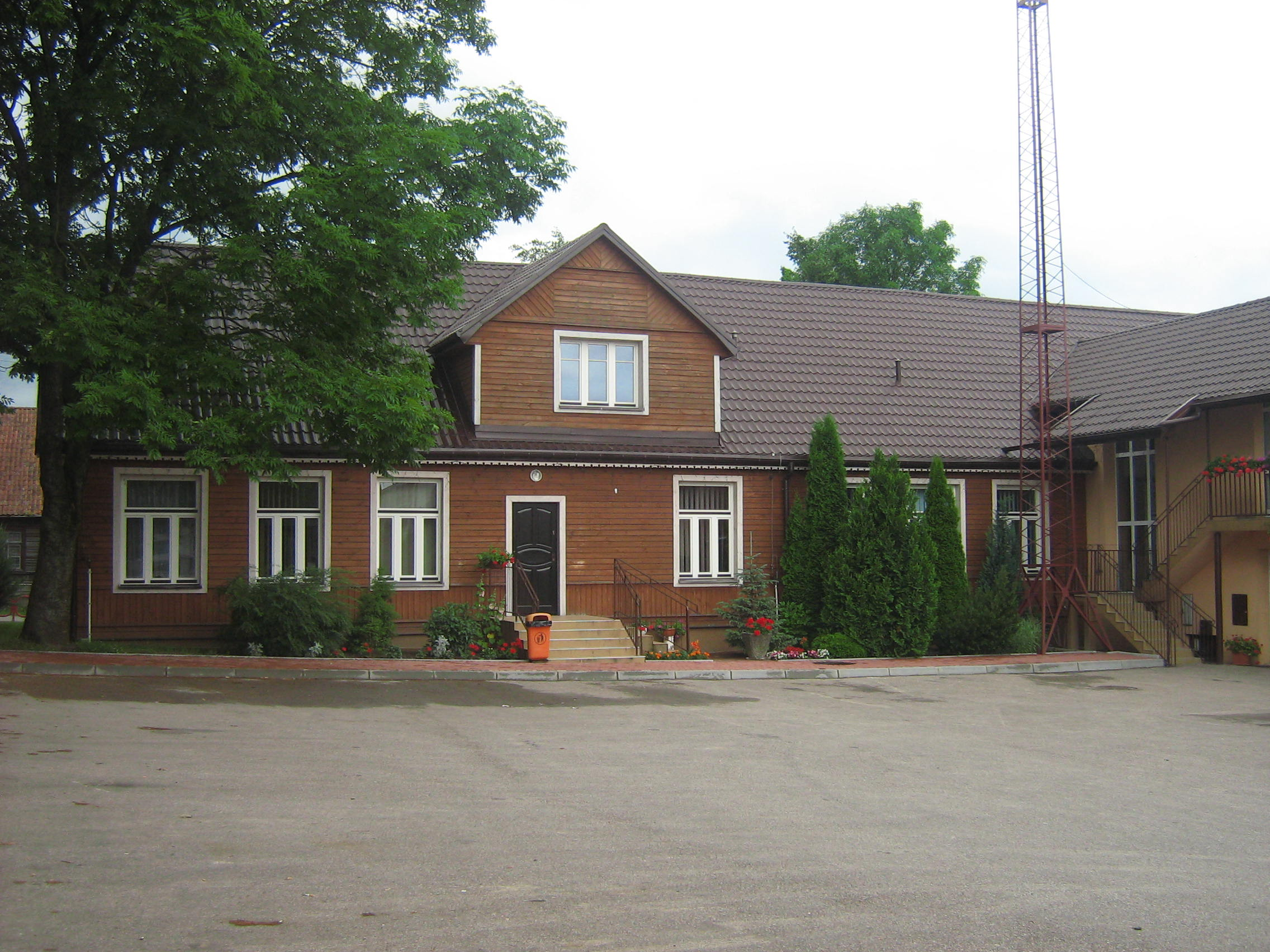
Well-preserved historic wooden architecture

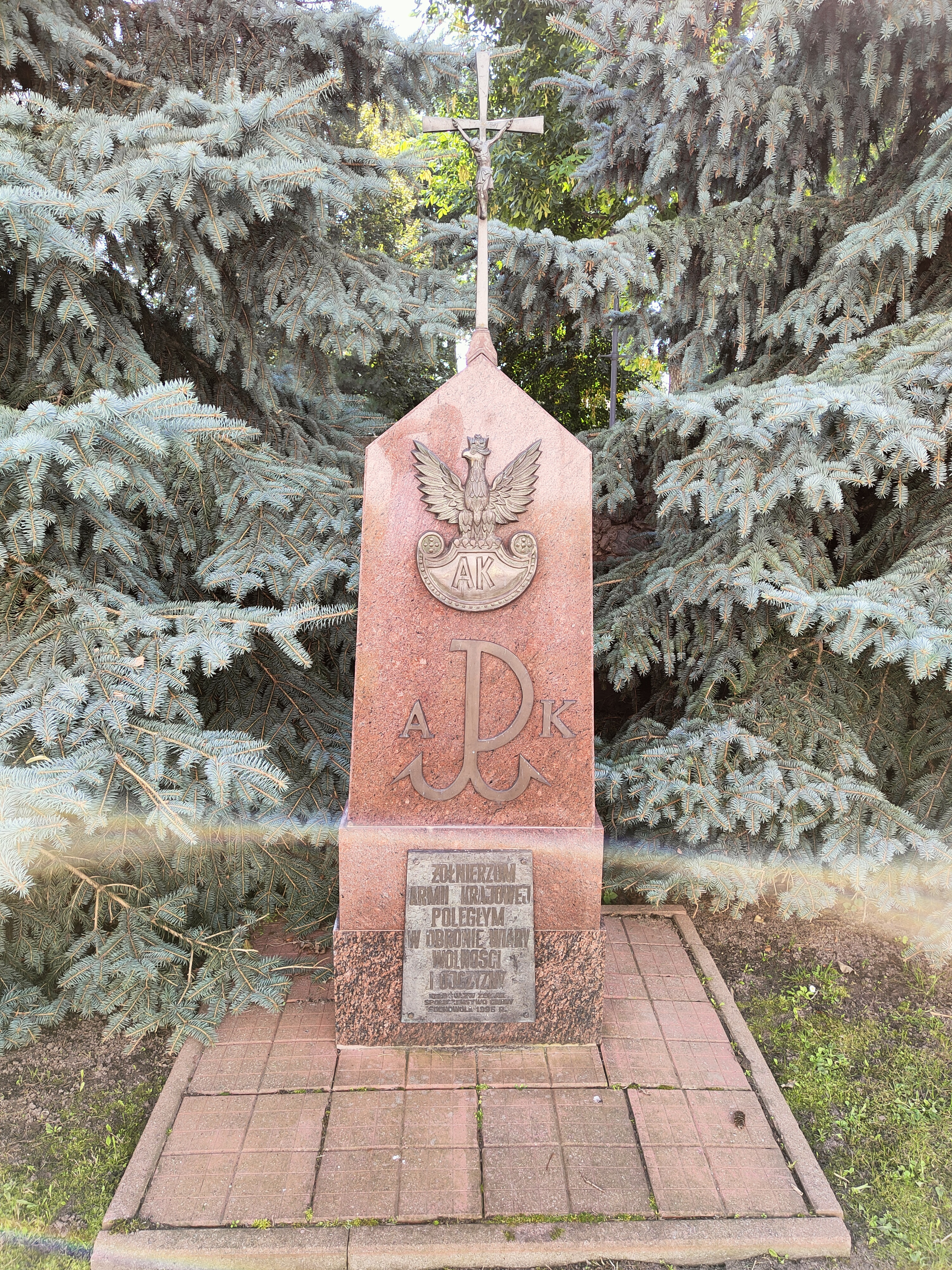
Home Army memorial

== Notable people ==
- Zenon Mróz (born 1930), materials science engineer
- Meyer Lansky (1903–1982, born Suchowljansky), American gangster originating from the area
