= John Langton (Canadian politician) =

Canadian businessman, politician and government official

- Born: April 7, 1808; Ormskirk, Lancashire, England
- Died: March 19, 1894 (aged 85); Toronto, Ontario, Canada
- Occupations: Politician, Auditor General
- Known for: First Auditor General of Canada

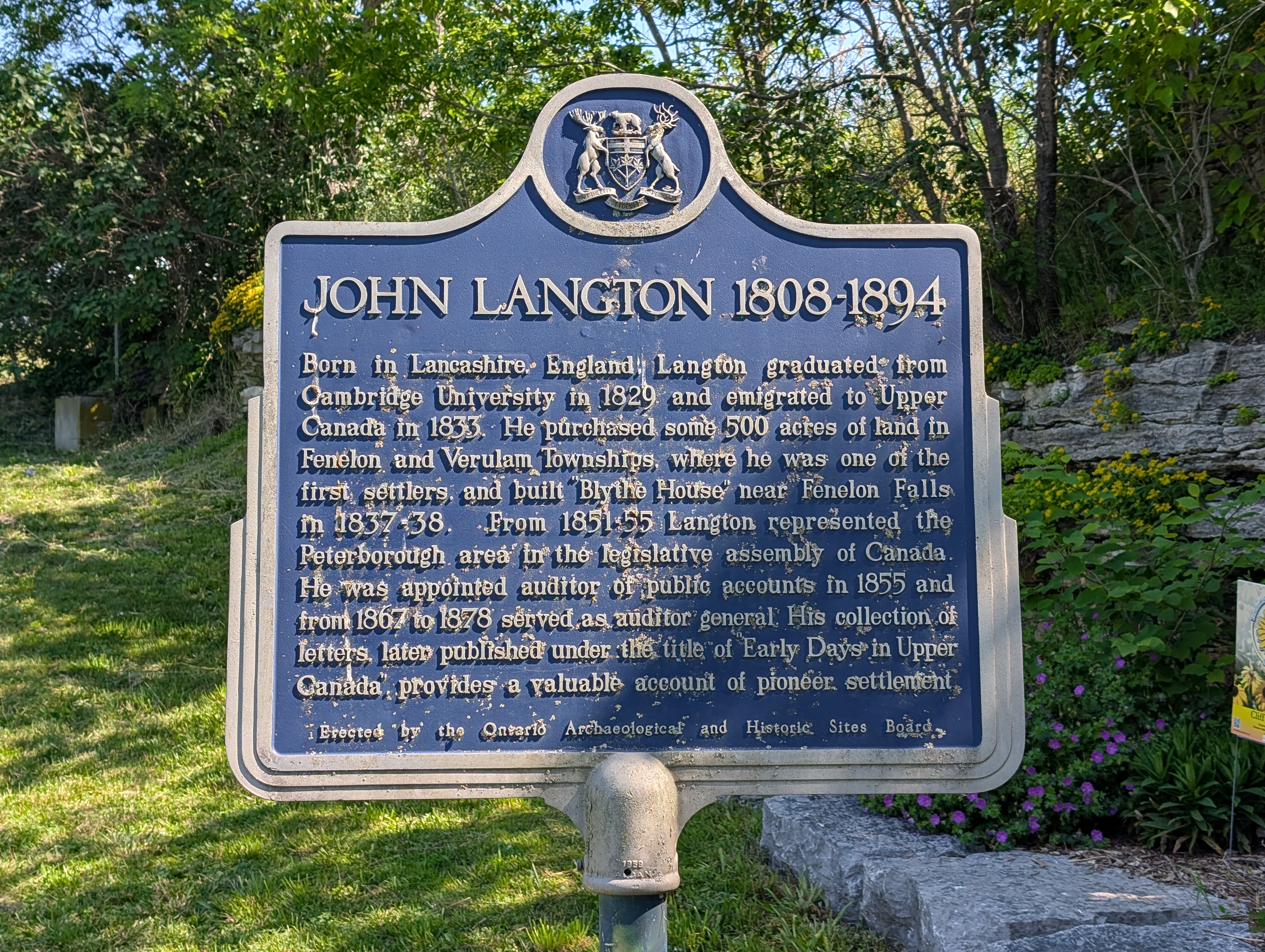
Plaque dedicated to John Langton in Fenelon Falls, Ontario

John Langton (April 7, 1808 – March 19, 1894) was Canada's first Auditor General.

He was born in Ormskirk, Lancashire, England in 1808 and studied at Trinity College, Cambridge. He emigrated to Upper Canada in 1833 and settled near Peterborough. He worked for a time in the timber trade. In 1841, he was elected to the council for the Colborne District, becoming warden in 1848. In 1851, Langton was elected to the Legislative Council for Peterborough; he was reelected in 1854. In 1855, he was appointed the Auditor of the Province of Canada and was also appointed as a member of the newly formed Board of Audit; he resigned his seat in the assembly the following year. He served as Auditor for the remaining tenure of the Province of Canada and the first decade of the fledgling new country of Canada; it was Langton who led in the production of the first financial statements of the Government of Canada in spite of many challenges. He also served on the senate for the University of Toronto Langton moved with the government to Quebec City in 1859 and was president of the Literary and Historical Society of Quebec. After Canadian Confederation in 1867, Langton was appointed the head of the federal Board of Audit. In 1870, he was named Deputy Minister of Finance and Secretary to the Treasury Board, while maintaining his role as Auditor General. The Auditor General's function was later to be separated from the finance department. He retired in 1878. From 1880 to 1882, he served as president of the Canadian Institute.

He died in Toronto, Ontario, Canada in 1894.

Government offices
Preceded by None	Auditor General of Canada; 1867–1878	Succeeded by John Lorn McDougall
