= Michael H. Rayner =

Michael Harold Rayner FCA

Auditor General of Canada
- In office 1980–1981
- Preceded by: James J. Macdonnell
- Succeeded by: Kenneth M. Dye

Personal details
- Born: November 18, 1943
- Died: March 30, 2004 (aged 61); Ottawa, Ontario, Canada
- Spouse: Susan Elizabeth Crawley

Michael Harold Rayner (November 18, 1943 – March 30, 2004) was acting Auditor General of Canada from 1980 to 1981. He grew up in numerous places, including Ottawa, Halifax, Nova Scotia and Victoria, British Columbia, with two brothers and three sisters.

His father was Vice-Admiral Herbert Rayner, a hero of World War II, who was in command of HMCS Huron and earned the Distinguished Service Cross.

Rayner became a chartered accountant in 1969, graduating from Carleton University with a degree in political science. Rayner worked in numerous roles for the federal government and also worked for Price Waterhouse Associates as partner-in-charge and Deloitte & Touche as senior partner. After becoming a chartered accountant, Rayner joined the Department of Supply and Services (now Public Works and Government Services Canada), where he coordinated the installation of systems-based auditing and education programmes in the Audit Services Bureau.

He was elected a Fellow of the Institute of Chartered Accountants of Ontario in 1982. From 1985 to 1986, he was Comptroller General of Canada. Rayner was a member of the board of governors of the Canadian Comprehensive Auditing Foundation, from 1980 to 1989. He was then appointed to the MacDonald Commission for the next two years. He was also a board member of the IFAC Strategy Review Task Force from 1996 to 1997. Rayner was President of the Canadian Institute of Chartered Accountants from 1993 to 2001.

He was married to Susan Elizabeth (née Crawley). He was sixty-one, when he died at his home in Ottawa. His funeral was held on April 3, at St. Matthew's Anglican Church in Ottawa. Rayner is interred at Rupert Union Cemetery.
