= John Fraser (auditor) =

Canadian civil servant (1852–1919)

Auditor General of Canada
- In office 1905–1919
- Preceded by: John Lorn McDougall
- Succeeded by: Edward Davenport Sutherland

Personal details
- Born: December 13, 1852 Glengarry County, Ontario
- Died: February 28, 1919 (aged 66) Daytona, Florida
- Children: 9

John Fraser (December 13, 1852 – February 28, 1919) was a Canadian civil servant who served as Auditor General of Canada from 1905 until 1919 and was also first cousin twice removed of the later former Auditor General Sheila Fraser. He was born at Loch Garry, Glengarry County, Ontario. Between 1870 and 1875, he worked in the commercial business, before becoming a clerk at the Department of Finance Canada. Fraser married Mary J. Atchison in July 1876, with whom he had six sons and three daughters. He was appointed Auditor General on August 1, 1905, and remained in the position until his death due to pneumonia on February 28, 1919, in Daytona, Florida. He received the Imperial Service Order in June 1908.
