= Kenneth M. Dye =

Canadian civil servant (1936–2023)

Kenneth Dye

Auditor General of Canada
- In office 1981–1991
- Preceded by: Michael H. Rayner
- Succeeded by: Denis Desautels

Personal details
- Born: Kenneth Malcolm Dye; January 16, 1936
- Died: September 5, 2023 (aged 87)

Kenneth Malcolm Dye (January 16, 1936 – September 5, 2023) was a Canadian accountant and the Auditor General of Canada from 1981 to 1991.

== Early life ==
Dye was trained as a chartered accountant at Simon Fraser University, and articled as a clerk with the firm of Grant Thornton Chartered Accountants in British Columbia. He graduated with his MBA in 1971.

During his term as Auditor General, Dye reorganized the office to take advantage of new technologies, assisted the governments of China, Australia and Russia in developing their own government auditing bodies.

Upon leaving office in 1991, Dye served as president of the Worker's Compensation Board of BC.

From 2004 to 2013, Dye was senior vice-president of the Cowater Accountability Group, a subsidiary of Cowater International Inc. Dye was also the secretary and treasurer of Canadian Council on Smoking and Health (CCSH).

Dye died on September 5, 2023, at the age of 87.
