= John Lorn McDougall =

Canadian politician

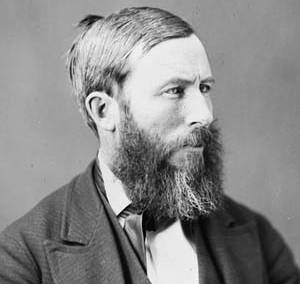

Ontario MPP
- In office 1867–1871
- Preceded by: New riding
- Succeeded by: Eric Harrington
- Constituency: Renfrew South

Personal details
- Born: November 6, 1838 Golden Lake, Upper Canada
- Died: January 15, 1909 (aged 70) Ottawa, Ontario, Canada
- Party: Liberal
- Spouse: Marion Eliza Morris
- Children: 11
- Occupation: Merchant

John Lorn McDougall CMG (November 6, 1838 – January 15, 1909) was an Ontario businessman and political figure. He represented Renfrew South in the Legislative Assembly of Ontario from 1867 to 1871 and in the House of Commons of Canada as a Liberal from 1869 to 1872 and from 1874 to 1878.

He was born in Golden Lake, Ontario, Upper Canada in 1838, the son of John Lorn McDougall, Sr. He studied at the High School of Montreal and then at the University of Toronto. He entered his father's business in Renfrew, taking over the operation of the business in 1860 when his father died. He served several terms as reeve of Renfrew and also was warden for Renfrew County. His lumber business failed in 1878 and, shortly afterward, he was named to the post of Auditor General of Canada. The Public Accounts Audit Act of 1878 established an auditor general who was independent of government financial operations and had some degree of independence from the party in power. His attention to detail, efforts to tighten controls on government spending, and persistence ruffled some feathers, but ultimately helped establish the importance of this role. Unfortunately, because his office relied on information provided by government departments, some instances of fraud went undetected. Despite resistance from government departments, he helped improve financial control by parliament and established annual reports on government spending. He resigned in 1905 and opened a private company that performed audits for companies and municipalities. He died in Ottawa in 1909 after suffering a series of strokes.

He was appointed CMG in the 1897 Diamond Jubilee Honours.

== Electoral history ==
1867 Ontario general election: Renfrew South
Party	Candidate	Votes	%
Liberal	John Lorn McDougall	543	63.96
Conservative	T.P. French	306	36.04
Total valid votes		849	71.17
Eligible voters		1,193	
Liberal pickup new district.			
Source: Elections Ontario

Government offices
Preceded by John Langton	Auditor General of Canada; 1878-1905	Succeeded by John Fraser
