= Michael Ferguson (auditor general) =

Canadian government official

14th Auditor General of Canada
- In office November 28, 2011 – February 2, 2019
- Prime Minister: Stephen Harper; Justin Trudeau
- Preceded by: John Wiersema
- Succeeded by: Sylvain Ricard

Personal details
- Born: April 9, 1958 Sackville, New Brunswick, Canada
- Died: February 2, 2019 (aged 60) Ottawa, Ontario, Canada
- Spouse: Georgina
- Children: 2
- Education: University of New Brunswick

Michael Ferguson (April 9, 1958 – February 2, 2019), was a Canadian accountant who served as Auditor General of Canada, from November 28, 2011 until his death. Previous to this post, he served as the deputy minister of finance and secretary to the board of management for the province of New Brunswick.

== Personal information ==
Born in Sackville, New Brunswick on April 9, 1958, he was the son of Winifred Dorothea Norma (Clarke) and Dr. George Gordon Ferguson, an Irish physician who immigrated to Canada in 1954. Ferguson graduated from Fredericton High School in 1976 and then graduated from the University of New Brunswick in 1980 with a Bachelor of Business Administration.

He went on to become a certified Chartered Accountant. From 2005 until 2010, Ferguson held various executive positions with the New Brunswick Institute of Chartered Accountants (NBICA).

Ferguson was married to Georgina (Blizzard) and has two sons Malcolm and Geoffrey. Ferguson underwent treatment for cancer in 2012 and was declared cancer free in 2018. the disease returned later in 2018, and Michael passed in Ottawa on February 2, 2019, while still in office.

== Government career ==
In 1985, Ferguson started work as an auditor in New Brunswick's comptroller's office. He became the provincial comptroller from 2000 to 2005. From 2005 to 2010, he was the province's Auditor General. Prior to becoming Auditor General of Canada, he served as Deputy Minister of Finance for the province of New Brunswick.

=== Auditor general of Canada ===
Ferguson's first report as auditor general was his 2012 spring report, released April 3, 2012. The report covered six audits of various Government of Canada operations and procurements, each contained within a separate chapter of the report:

- Chapter 1 – Border Controls on Commercial Imports
- Chapter 2 – Replacing Canada’s Fighter Jets
- Chapter 3 – Interest-bearing Debt
- Chapter 4 – Non-filers and non-registrants – Canada Revenue Agency
- Chapter 5 – Oversight of Civil Aviation – Transport Canada
- Chapter 6 – Special Examinations of Crown Corporations – 2011

The report also included an appendix report of the President of the Treasury Boards’ Annual Report to Parliament on the Tabling of Crown Corporations’ Reports 2011.

Chapter 2 of the 2012 spring report ignited controversy for the Conservative government by revealing the process to procure 65 F-35 Lightning II stealth fighters for the RCAF was troubled by several irregularities. On April 5, 2012, Ferguson revealed the government likely knew prior to the May 2011 General Election that the $16 billion final price tag to purchase and maintain the jets was $10 billion under budget. The report and subsequent revelation prompted the opposition NDP to call for Defence Minister Peter Mackay's resignation.

Government offices
Preceded by John Wiersema	Auditor General of Canada; 2011-2019	Succeeded by Sylvain Ricard
