= Clarence de Silva =

Canadian engineer

Clarence de Silva is a Canadian engineer, currently the Senior Canada Research Chair in Mechatronics and Industrial Automation, University of British Columbia and also a published author. He is a Fellow of the Institute of Electrical and Electronics Engineers, American Society of Mechanical Engineers, Royal Society of Canada, Canadian Academy of Engineering, and Distinguished Visiting Fellow of Royal Academy of Engineering UK.
