= Sheila Fraser =

Canadian civil servant (born 1950)

Sheila Fraser OC

Auditor General of Canada
- In office May 31, 2001 – May 30, 2011
- Preceded by: Denis Desautels
- Succeeded by: John Wiersema (acting)

Personal details
- Born: September 16, 1950 (age 75) Dundee, Quebec

Sheila Fraser OC (born September 16, 1950) served as Auditor General of Canada from 2001 to 2011.

== Early life and education ==
Fraser was born in Dundee, Quebec, Canada to Kenneth Fraser (1917-2005), a Quebec Member of the National Assembly for Huntingdon from 1966 to 1976. She earned a Bachelor of Commerce from McGill University's Desautels Faculty of Management in 1972. She then became a chartered accountant in 1974 and FCA in 1994. In 1981, she worked for Ernst and Young where she worked on assignment to the Auditor General of Quebec in some cases, and other Quebec government offices.

== Auditor General of Canada ==
In January 1999, she joined the Office of the Auditor General of Canada as Deputy Auditor General, Audit Operations. She was subsequently appointed Auditor General in 2001. Her 10-year mandate as Auditor General ended on May 30, 2011. During her time in office, a Reader's Digest poll listed her as one of the top five most trusted Canadians.

She made headlines across Canada when her report on the sponsorship scandal rocked the country's political scene. She confirmed serious problems in the federal government's management of its Sponsorship Program for a four-year period beginning in 1997. In a few very troubling cases, sponsorship funds were transferred to Crown corporations using what the Auditor General called "highly questionable methods." That is, they appeared to have been designed to pay significant commissions to communications agencies, while hiding the source of funding and the true nature of the transactions. Parliament and the parliamentary appropriations process were not respected.

The Auditor General made the news again on November 26, 2006, with her report on the former ombudsman of federal inmates. The report made a series of allegations that the former ombudsman, Ron Stewart, had "often skipped work and collected $325,000 in improper or questionable salary, vacation pay and expenses during his 14-year tenure". The case is currently being reviewed by the RCMP to determine if criminal charges are warranted.

During the week of January 18 to 22, 2010, Fraser visited Afghanistan to observe the military and development progress of the Canadian mission there. She expressed concern for the fate of the projects and the training of Afghan police and military, after Canada is scheduled to leave in 2011.

She gave her last public speech, on May 25, 2011, at the Canadian Club of Ottawa, entitled Serving Parliament Through a Decade of Change, where she warned the government faces long-term fiscal pressures that will mean "very hard choices" between raising taxes or cutting programs and encouraged the government to publicize its long-term fiscal projections because "without them, we cannot begin to understand the scale and complexity of our financial challenges and the implication of policy choices.". Fraser also criticized the "truly shocking" lack of improvement on First Nations reserves and also said "I actually think it's quite tragic when you see that there is a population in this country that does not have the sort of basic services that Canadians take for granted.". She also referred to the Sponsorship scandal as "a pivotal event with a lasting impact" and "broke just about every rule in the book".

== Other business positions ==
Fraser was appointed to the board of directors at Manulife in November 2011.

== Honours ==
Sheila Fraser received an honorary Doctor of Laws from the University of Waterloo in October 2005.

== Family ==
She is divorced and has three children.

Her grandfather's cousin, John Fraser, also served as Auditor General of Canada.
