= L. Denis Desautels =

Auditor General of Canada
- In office April 1, 1991 – March 31, 2001
- Preceded by: Kenneth M. Dye
- Succeeded by: Sheila Fraser

Personal details
- Born: May 14, 1943 (age 83) Saint-Bruno-de-Montarville, Quebec, Canada

L. Denis Desautels, OC (born May 14, 1943) is a Canadian accountant, corporate director, and former Auditor General of Canada.

== Early life and education ==
Born in Saint-Bruno-de-Montarville, Quebec, Desautels received a Bachelor of Commerce degree from the McGill University Desautels Faculty of Management in 1964 and became a Chartered Accountant in 1966.

== Career ==
In 1964, Desautels joined the Montreal accounting firm of Clarkson Gordon (now Caron Bélanger Ernst & Young). While working in the Ottawa office he participated in an exchange program with the office of the Auditor General. From April 1, 1991 until March 31, 2001 he was the Auditor General of Canada.

He has served on the board of directors of CARE Canada, the Laurentian Bank of Canada, Groupe Jean Coutu (PJC) Inc., Bombardier Inc. and Alcan Inc.

== Honours ==
He was named a Fellow by the Order of Chartered Accountants of Quebec in 1986 and a Fellow by the Institute of Chartered Accountants of Ontario in 1991. He has received honorary doctorates from the University of Ottawa and from the University of Waterloo. In 2001, he was made an Officer of the Order of Canada in recognition of "a distinguished career in the private sector" and for having "served his country with dedication and integrity as Auditor General of Canada".
