= Marie Sanderson =

Canadian climatologist (1921–2010)

Marie Elizabeth Sanderson (1921-2010; née Lustig) was a Canadian geographer and climatologist.

== Early life and education ==
Marie Lustig was born on 16 November 1921 in Chesley, Ontario, Canada. She was one of the earliest graduates in geography from the University of Toronto, and then gained an MA from the University of Maryland and a PhD from the University of Michigan. At Toronto she began a course in Social and Philosophical Studies but after enjoying the geography element, taught by Griffith Taylor, she enrolled for honours in geography, and was one of only three students to graduate in that subject in 1944. Taylor taught her climatology and, as a survivor of Robert Falcon Scott's 1910-1912 Terra Nova Expedition, inspired her interest in Arctic regions.

She married Robert Sanderson, described as her "childhood sweetheart", on 3 August 1946.

== Career ==
Sanderson studied with C. W. Thornthwaite while studying for her master's degree, and in 1949 she set up evapotranspirometers he had designed as part of the first climate experiment in Northwest Territories, at Norman Wells.

She was appointed as an assistant professor of geography at the University of Windsor in 1965, and taught there until her retirement in 1989. She was the first female professor of geography in Canada. In 1980 she and Paul Hebert founded the Great Lakes Institute for Environmental Research (GLIER) at the university. After her retirement from Windsor she became an adjunct professor of the University of Waterloo and established the Water Network there.

She wrote biographies of her teachers Griffith Taylor and C. W. Thornthwaite, and published several books on water and climate.

== Recognition ==
In 1993 Ryerson University, now Toronto Metropolitan University, awarded Sanderson a Ryerson Fellowship (an award for " individuals whose significant accomplishments exemplify the polytechnic ideal") for "Expanding the Role of Women in Geographic Research and Education".

She was awarded honorary degrees by the universities of Lethbridge, Toronto, Waterloo, and Windsor. That from Toronto, a Doctorate of Laws in the category "Scholarship - Geography", was given in 2010 when she was too ill with breast cancer to attend a ceremony, but the university chancellor and president and the chair of the geography department visited her at her home in their full academic robes to confer the degree.

She was president of the Canadian Association of Geographers, the first woman to hold that post.

== Personal life ==
In 2009 Sanderson self-published an autobiography: High heels in the tundra : my life as a geographer and climatologist.

Although she had travelled widely, Sanderson declared her "favourite place in the world" was Inverhuron on Lake Huron where she had a cottage.

Sanderson died from breast cancer on 12 July 2010, survived by two daughters, a son, two step-daughters, and ten grandchildren.

== Legacy ==
An archive of Sanderson's papers is held at Wilfrid Laurier University.

== Selected publications ==
- Sanderson, Marie (1987). Implications of climatic change for navigation and power generation in the Great Lakes : summary of Great Lakes Institute reports. [Ottawa]: Climate Program Office, Canadian Climate Centre. ISBN 9780662554905.
- Sanderson, Marie (1988). Griffith Taylor : Antarctic scientist and pioneer geographer. Ottawa: Carleton University Press. ISBN 9780886290689.
- Sanderson, Marie; Borzenkova, I. I. (1990). Unesco sourcebook in climatology for hydrologists and water resource engineers. Paris: Unesco. ISBN 9789231027123.
- Sanderson, Marie (1993). The Impact of climate change on water in the Grand River basin, Ontario. [Waterloo, Ont.]: Dept. of Geography, University of Waterloo. ISBN 9780921083481.
- Mather, John R.; Sanderson, Marie (1996). The genius of C. Warren Thornthwaite, climatologist-geographer. University of Oklahoma Press. ISBN 9780806127873.
- Sanderson, Marie (1993). Prevailing trade winds : climate and weather in Hawaii. Honolulu: University of Hawaii Press. ISBN 9780824814915.
- Putnam, Robert G.; Sanderson, Marie (2000). Down to earth : a biography of geographer Donald Fulton Putnam. University of Toronto, Department of Geography. ISBN 9780772781505.
- Sanderson, Marie (2009). High heels in the tundra : my life as a geographer and climatologist. [S.l.]: iUniverse Inc. ISBN 9781440147210.
