= Auditor General of British Columbia =

Canadian government accountability agency

- Incumbent; Bridget Parrish since December 1, 2025
- Abbreviation: OAGBC
- Reports to: Legislative Assembly of British Columbia
- Term length: 8 years non-renewable
- Constituting instrument: Auditor General Act

Office of the Auditor General of British Columbia
Agency overview
- Formed: 1977
- Headquarters: Victoria, British Columbia, Canada
- Employees: 130
- Website: https://oag.bc.ca

The Auditor General of British Columbia is an independent Officer of the Legislature of British Columbia, responsible for conducting audits of the government reporting entity (GRE) which consists of ministries, Crown corporations, and other organizations controlled by or accountable to the provincial government. Independence is a vital safeguard for fulfilling the Auditor General's responsibilities objectively and fairly based solely on the evidence found while conducting proper audit procedures. For this reason, the Auditor General reports directly to the Legislative Assembly and not the government of the day.

The Office of the Auditor General of British Columbia (OAGBC) is located in Victoria, B.C., Canada.

== History ==
=== Auditors General in B.C. ===
The position of Auditor General in B.C. was first filled in 1861, with a continuous line of auditors general until 1917. However, these auditors did not benefit from objectivity and independence from government direction and operational priorities: qualities that are the distinguishing features of a modern auditing and legislative reporting function.

The position was re-established in 1977 with the Auditor General Act, brought in to "fill a gap that has existed in British Columbia up to this time," according to then-Finance Minister E.M. Wolfe.

Since then, the Auditor General has been governed solely by the Auditor General Act. Per the Act, the Legislative Assembly must unanimously appoint a person to be the Auditor General. The Auditor General holds office for a non-renewable eight-year term.

The Auditor General can resign from the office at any time by giving written notice to the Speaker of the Legislative Assembly. The Auditor General can be suspended from office if a resolution is passed by 2/3 or more of the members present in the Legislative Assembly.

=== List of all B.C. Auditors General ===
Auditor General	Appointment Date	Departure Date
Bridget Parrish, CPA, CA	December 1, 2025	
Sheila Dodds, CPA, CA^	November 15, 2024	December 1, 2025
Michael A. Pickup, FCPA, FCA	July 27, 2020	November 15, 2024
Russ Jones, MBA, CA^	December 31, 2019	July 24, 2020
Carol Bellringer, FCA	September 15, 2014	December 31, 2019
Russ Jones, MBA, CA^	May 27, 2013	September 14, 2014
John Doyle, MAcc, FCA	October 29, 2007	May 27, 2013
Errol Price, FCA, CMC^	June 4, 2007	October 28, 2007
Arn Van Iersel, FCGA^	June 7, 2006	June 1, 2007
Wayne Strelioff, FCA	March 1, 2000	May 2, 2006
George L. Morfitt, FCA	January 1, 1988	January 1, 2000
Robert J. Hayward, CA^	November 1, 1986	January 1, 1988
Erma P. Morrison, FCA	September 1, 1977,	October 31, 1986
William Allison	April 1, 1913	January 1, 1917
John A. Anderson	December 1, 1900	April 1, 1913
James McBride Smith	January 1, 1880	January 1, 1900
John J. Austin^	January 1, 1879	January 1, 1880
W.C. Berkely^^	March 4, 1873	January 1, 1878
Thomas R. Holmes^	September 1, 1871	February 1, 1873
Robert Ker	August 31, 1861	September 1, 1871

^Acting Auditor General ^^Audit Clerk

== Present day ==
=== Office of the Auditor General ===
==== Quick Facts ====
Fiscal 2025/26:

- 115 regular
- 8 auxiliary staff

==== Training Office ====
The OAGBC is a recognized Chartered Accountant Training Office, meeting the profession's Practical Experience Requirements of providing audit, assurance and taxation hours.

The OAGBC also participates in the Canadian Comprehensive Auditing Foundation's international programs, which provides performance audit training for developing audit offices in a variety of countries.
