= List of Canadian planners =

Modern urban planning in Canada can be traced back to the early 1900s, though Indigenous planning, an evolving practice, originated hundreds if not thousands of years ago. The planning profession originally focused on city layout, land subdivision and architecture and grew dramatically after 1945 due to the growth of Canadian cities. The profession now includes a diverse range of subjects such as urban sociology, data analysis and forecasting, municipal and planning law, management sciences and environmental sciences. According to the Canadian Institute of Planners, the profession has grown from only 45 practicing planners in 1949 to about 8,000 practitioners in 2022. This page compiles some of Canada's most notable planners according to their contributions to the profession.

== List of notable Canadian planners and their contributions ==
Name	Active	Area of Expertise	Contributions to Planning	Awards and Appointments
Thomas Adams	1871-1940	Town Planner	Adams shared the ideas of the Garden City movement, although some authors suggest their ideas were broader and deeper. In 1917, he wrote Rural planning and development: a study of rural conditions and problems in Canada; the first ever planning book in Canada. He became known in the field because of his extensive writing to "Conservation of life: public health, housing and town planning" and because he founded in 1919 the Town Planning Institute of Canada.	He was appointed as an advisor to the Canadian Commission of Conservation in 1914.
Paul Bedford	Current		As Chief Planner at the City of Toronto, Paul worked with Jane Jacobs to create innovative plans for King-Spadina and King-Parliament, and initiated planning that was a precursor to the redevelopment of the Central Waterfront. He has served on the Advisory Committee on Planning, Design and Realty for the National Capital Commission and on the board of directors for Metrolinx. He is an adjunct professor at the University of Toronto and Ryerson University.	College of Fellows of the Canadian Institute of Planners
Larry Beasley	Current	City planning	Former Co-director of Planning for the City of Vancouver who was recognized for his work on revitalizing the downtown core of the city. Since his retirement from the city has worked on numerous successful international projects and developed plans for cities such as Dallas, Abu Dhabi and Rotterdam. He served on the National Capital Commission’s ‘Advisory Committee on Planning, Design and Realty’ in Ottawa for 16 years, and on the Board of the Canadian Urban Institute. He has recently published Ecodesign for Cities along with Jonathan Barnett.	He has received an Order of Canada in 2005 as well as Diamond Jubilee Medal.
Hans Blumenfeld	1892-1988	City planning, regional planning		Officer of the Order of Canada 1978
Peter Boothroyd	Current	Community planning, Participatory planning	His professional and academic career was in the research and promotion of citizen engagement in planning. He worked in the 1980s in collaboration with Indigenous communities to conduct participatory planning exercises, through the University of British Columbia. He also worked internationally in Vietnam and Brazil on capacity-building projects through the Canadian International Development Agency (CIDA).	He is a professor emerita at the School of Community and Regional Planning at UBC.
Ken Cameron	Current	Regional planning, Livability, Regional transportation	As Manager of Policy and Planning for the Greater Vancouver Regional District in the 1990s, Ken led the ratification of the award-winning Livable Region Strategic Plan, gaining the approval of the region's then 21 municipalities. Ken was also a key figure in the creation of TransLink, Greater Vancouver's award-winning regional transportation authority. He published City Making in Paradise: 9 Decision that Saved Vancouver in 2007 and is an adjunct professor at Simon Fraser University.	College of Fellows of the Canadian Institute of Planners
Humphrey Carver	1902-1995	Housing, Social planning, Architect	He was a strong advocate for a federal housing policy in Canada. One of his main hopes was to see all Canadians housed, no matter the income level. He was for a federally funded public housing program that would be implemented on the local level, by municipalities, non-profit associations or co-operatives. The Rent-to-Income system was also devised by him. Carver is known for his association with Regent Park, the first and largest public housing offered in Canada	He has chaired the research committee and advisory group for the Canadian Mortgage and Housing Association (CMHC). In 1968 he was made a Fellow of the Canadian Institute of Planners. -
Noulan Cauchon	1872-1935	Engineering, Architecture	Noulan Cauchon was an engineer, town planner and architect born in Quebec City. Cauchon influenced the early development of the planning profession in Canada with his ideas of the City Scientific approach. This approach, influenced by his background in engineering, contrasted the popular City Beautiful movement at the time. The City Scientific approach to planning has largely dominated in the Canadian profession since 1918. Cauchon was a strong ally of Thomas Adams during his campaign to extend town planning across the country.	Cauchon is known as a founder of the Town Planning Institute of Canada and the Ottawa Town Planning Commission.
Arthur Charles Erickson	1953-1991	Architecture and Urban Planning	Arthur Erickson has been recognized as the first Canadian architect who received international recognition or his iconic buildings and master plans in Canada and around world. Some examples of his work are Simon Fraser University, theme buildings in Expo 67, Robson Square, San Diego Convention Center, Roy Thompson Hall in Toronto.	He was given the companion of Order of Canada in 1981
Samuel Gitterman	1911-1998	Architecture and Urban Planning	The first Chief Architect and Planner of the Canada Mortgage and Housing Corporation. Gitterman was responsible for designing small houses, subdivisions, and townsites across Canada for the Department of National Defense, among other federal organizations. Gitterman sat as the Advisor on Housing Research for CMHC’s advisory group, alongside Humphrey Carver, and wrote and lectured on mid-20th century urban planning principles.	He received the first Gold Medal award from the Royal Architectural Institute of Canada, was inducted into the Canadian Home Builders' Association Hall of Fame, and received the CMHC Award for Outstanding Contribution to the Housing Industry.
Jill Grant	Current	Community planning	Jill Grant is a Professor Emeritus at the School of Planning at Dalhousie University; from 2002 to 2008 she was Director of the School. Her research focuses on suburban planning practice and the issue of the public versus private realm. Some of her more recent research has focused on the influence of the creative class and creative cities.	Jill Grant is a Fellow of the Canadian Institute of Planners.
Gerald Hodge	Current	Canadian planning	He believes that Community and Regional Planning in Canada are distinctive from other places. Accordingly, he wrote Planning Canadian Communities, which as of 2016 is in its 6th edition.	Director of the planning school at Queen's University (1973–85). Editor of Plan Canada (1979–81). Recipient of the Canadian Institute of Planners' 2008 President's Award.
Harold Spence-Sales	1907-2004	Canadian Urban Planner	Harold Spence-Sales was a Canadian urban planner. He believed that the ",'suburbs are the cradle of civilization' and to be emphatic in their sound design" was of the utmost importance. He believed in the importance of planning with environmental concerns in mind long before it was a mainstream issue. Throughout his career, Spence-Sales was a driving force in developing planning legislation and establishing planning departments for many major Canadian cities. He has also been credited with starting the first ever Canadian graduate studies program in urban and town planning at McGill University.	Harold Spence-Sales Prize in Urban Planning. A scholarship set up in Spence-Sales memory for a student studying urban planning at McGill University. Being granted the position of Emeritus professor at McGill University in 1987. Being Inducted into the Canadian Institute of Planners as a Fellow. Doctorate of laws from Simon Fraser University with Mary Filer for their contributions to the arts.
Harry Lash	?-1995	Livability, Regional planning	As the first Director of Planning for the Greater Vancouver Regional District, Harry championed planning through dialogue and citizen engagement, leading to the development of the first regional plan, "The Livable Region 1976/1986" that has come to define the regional identity of Vancouver. He published Planning in a Human Way in 1976.	College of Fellows of the Canadian Institute of Planners
Ann McAfee	Current	Urban planning, Land economics, Housing	First woman to have received a PhD in Planning in Canada She was the City of Vancouver's co-director of Planning and led the community consultation of city of Vancouver's first citywide plan. Ann has been a global planning advisor for many fast growing cities in China, Sweden and Australia. She consulted the City of Auckland on their Unitary Plan that won the New Zealand Planning Institute (NZPI) award in 2013.	College of Fellows of the Canadian Institute of Planners
Peter Oberlander	1922-2008	Sustainable urbanization, International development	Established Canada's first professional planning school at the University of British Columbia; established the first federal Ministry of State for Urban Affairs, which initiated urban renewal projects that created Vancouver's Granville Island and Toronto's Harbourfront; served as senior advisor to the United Nations on various Commissions and Forums on urbanization and international development, including contributing to the creation of UN Habitat.	Order of Canada, President's Lifetime Achievement Award of the Canadian Institute of Planners, Civic Merit Award from the City of Vancouver, United Nations Scroll of Honour Award
William E. Rees	Current	Ecological footprint and urbanisation, Sustainable environmental assessment tools	William Rees is a human ecologist and ecological economist and a distinguished former professor and director at the School of Community and Regional Planning at the University of British Columbia (retired 2011). He is the founder of Ecological Footprint concept that measures the human impact on Earth's natural resources and ecosystems. His book, Our Ecological Footprint has received international recognition and have been translated to 9 different languages.	He was recognized as one of B.C.’s leading public Intellectuals in 2000 by the Vancouver Sun; Was awarded an Honorary Doctorate from Laval University and became a fellow at the Royal Society of Canada in 2006. Received the Trudeau Foundation Fellowship in 2007. Was awarded the Boulding Prize in Ecological Economics and the Blue Planet Prize in 2012.
Norbert Schoenauer	1923-2001	Housing	Schoenauer taught with a focus on mixed land use; and mid-rise high-density housing. He published in 1981, 6000 Years of Housing, which was re-edited in 2000, arguably his more important book with a great impact in the field.	He taught for 40 years at the McGill School of Architecture. Executive director Canada Mortgage and Housing Corporation (1975–77). Recipient of the Order of Architects of Quebec's La Medaille du Mérite in 1995, and of the Association of Collegiate Schools of Architecture's distinguished professor award in 1999.
Jeanne Wolfe	1934-2009	Urban planning, Housing, International development planning	Contributor and promoter of urban planning in Quebec as an academic professor and as a professional planner. Her interest include housing, planning processes and international planning. She has provided advice on planning issues to the Canadian International Development Agency (CIDA), the World Bank, and the Inter-American Development Bank (IDB). Her writing contributed to the literature on housing policy in Canada and urban geography in Montreal She was also involved in public affairs, supporting co-operative housing and environmental preservation movements.	Professor emerita at the School of Urban Planning at McGill University. She was posthumously appointed as a Member of the Order of Canada in 2009.
