= John Bland (architect) =

Canadian architect (1911–2002)

- Born: 13 November 1911; Lachine, Quebec
- Died: 26 March 2002 (aged 90); Montreal, Quebec
- Education: McGill School of Architecture; Architectural Association
- Occupation: Architect
- Awards: Fellow of the Royal Architectural Institute of Canada; Royal Canadian Academy of Arts; Médaille du Mérite of the Province of Quebec Association of Architects; Massey Medal; Gabrielle Léger Lifetime Achievement Award
- Buildings: John G. Diefenbaker Building

John Bland FRAIC (13 November 1911 – 26 March 2002) was a Canadian architect and educator. He played a fundamental role in transforming architectural education in Canada, spending more than five decades teaching at the McGill School of Architecture including a 31-year tenure as director, under which Bland transformed the School from a Beaux-Arts institution into one based on contemporary design principles. He also introduced the first Canadian graduate programs in Architecture. Many important individuals in architecture learned under Bland, including Arthur Erickson and Moshe Safdie, as well as the heads of architecture schools in at least six countries. In addition to his teaching career, Bland was a practicing architect, working alongside Harold Spence-Sales prior to joining McGill and collaborating with many Montreal architects on other projects throughout his tenure. He was the president of the Province of Quebec Association of Architects in 1953, and served on the council from 1942 to 1954. He was also a member of the Council of the Royal Architectural Institute of Canada (RAIC) from 1950 to 1954, and was elected to the RAIC College of Fellows in 1954 and the Royal Canadian Academy of Arts (RCA) in 1967.

== Personal life and education ==
John Bland was born in Lachine, Quebec on 13 November 1911 to Canadian parents. He received his elementary schooling at Montreal High School and attended secondary school at Loyola College. At the age of seventeen, he enrolled at the McGill School of Architecture and graduated in 1933 with Honours. He then went on to pursue postgraduate studies in town planning at the Architectural Association School of Architecture in London, England, where he became the Librarian of Planning and received his Diploma in Planning with Honours in 1937. John was married to Fay Bland and was a father to a daughter, Clara, and three sons, Johnny, Andrew and Harry. Toward the end of his life, he and his wife lived on the shore of Lake Saint-Louis.

== Architectural career ==
After graduating from the Architectural Association School, Bland worked for the planning department of the London County Council. In 1938, he travelled in France, Germany and Austria before returning to his hometown of Montreal. Before leaving London, he co-authored "England's Water Problem" with fellow architect Harold Spence-Sales, which analysed drought conditions in the south of England. Bland co-founded an architectural and planning practice with Spence-Sales, winning several competitions and designing many architectural and planning projects with him. Competitions won by the practice include the Liverpool Trades Association Housing Competition (1937), Timber Development Association Camp Competition (1937) and the News Chronicle Schools Competition (1938). Their architectural work included a restaurant in Westminster, London (1937), a school for 80 children at Merstham, Surrey (1938), a house at Tadworth, Surrey (1938), and a general store in Newhaven, Sussex (1939). Their planning work included the South London Survey (1937), Vulnerable Area Survey (1938) and the Future Development Section of the RIBA Road Exhibition (1939).

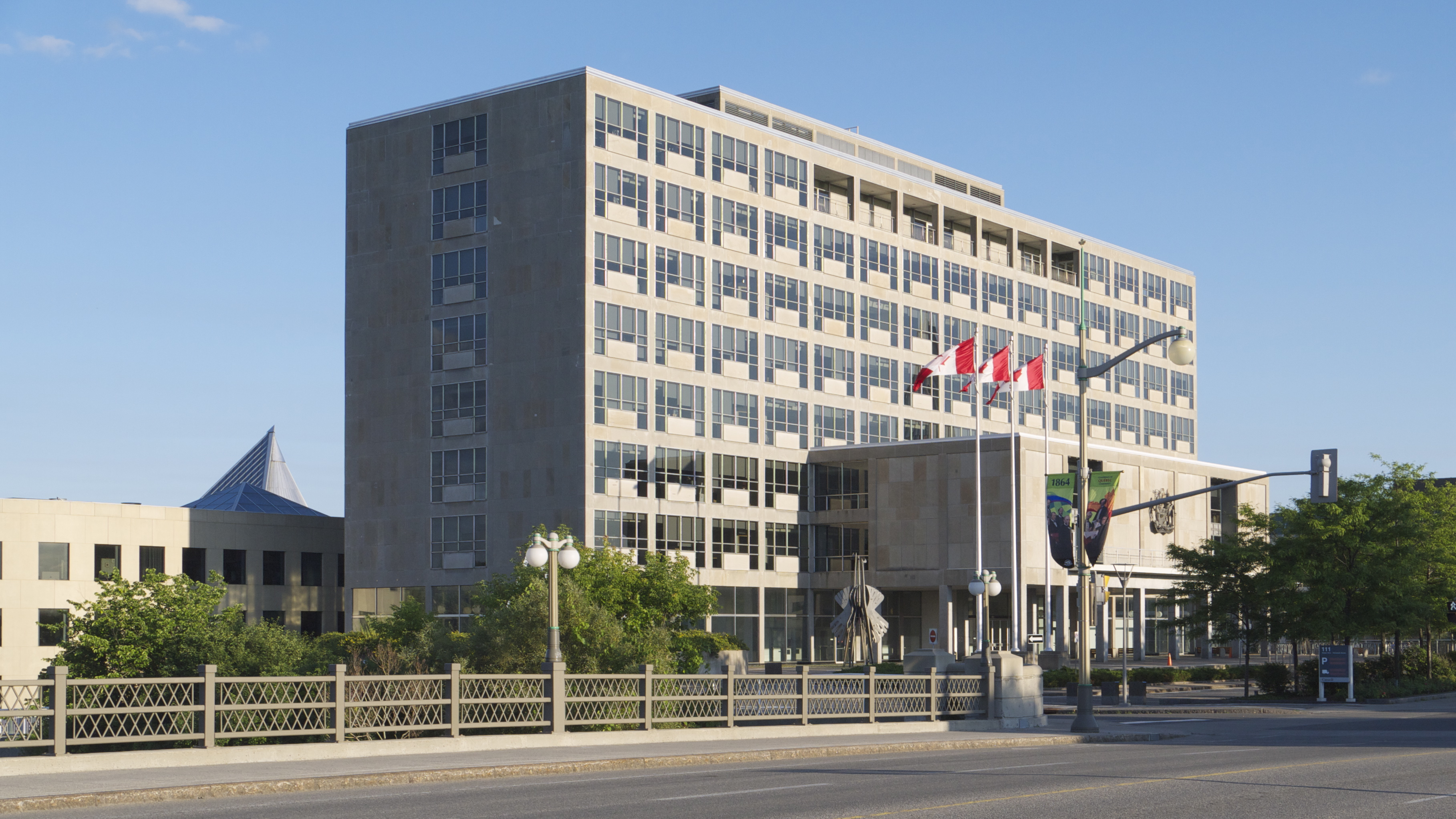
The John G. Diefenbaker Building (formerly Ottawa City Hall), for which Bland received the Massey Medal in 1959.

Bland remained actively involved in architectural practice throughout his tenure at McGill's School of Architecture. He carried out his architectural work in Montreal through a series of partnerships at different periods, with architects Gordon Edwards, Michel Lacroix, Roy LeMoyne, Vincent Rother, Charles Elliot Trudeau and Anthony Shine. Major projects include the Jeanne Mance Housing Development in Montreal (1957–58) and plans for Acadia University, Carleton University, and the new town of Deep River, Ontario and Port Cartier, Quebec (1958–59).

Buildings designed by his firms include Ottawa City Hall (now the John G. Diefenbaker Building) (1957–59), the Labyrinth for Expo '67, a library for University of Windsor and two buildings at McGill University, Chancellor Day Hall (1965) and Pollock Hall of the Schulich School of Music (1973).

== Teaching career ==
Following his years practicing architecture in the United Kingdom, Bland returned to Montreal to begin his teaching career at the McGill School of Architecture in 1939. In 1941, he became the first Canadian-born director of the School, and maintained this position for 31 years until 1972. In 1953, he was appointed to the Macdonald Chair in Architecture and remained so until his retirement in 1978, upon which he was appointed Emeritus Professor. Although he had retired from full-time teaching at the School, he continued to teach part-time for nearly twenty years and founded the John Bland Canadian Architecture Collection (CAC) at McGill during this time, which remains one of the most important architecture collections in Canada. The holdings of the CAC reflect Bland's career as an educator and an architect. He was responsible for gathering and assembling the materials which make up the archives of the CAC.

When Bland retired from full-time teaching at McGill in 1978, he wrote to Derek Drummond, the director of the School that year, "At the end of my next month my appointment at McGill will end. It has been longer than I expected and more rewarding than I can measure." His long tenure with the School lent him the opportunity to teach many generations of architects, including some of the most important individuals in the field, such as Moshe Safdie, Arthur Erickson, and the directors of multiple Schools of Architecture in Canada, the United States, England, Norway, Israel, Colombia and India.

== Awards & honours ==
- Fellow of the Royal Architectural Institute of Canada (1954)
- Member of the Royal Canadian Academy of Arts (1967)
- Médaille du Mérite of the Province of Quebec Association of Architects (1971)
- Massey Medal for the Ottawa City Hall (1959)
- Honorary Doctor of Science from Carleton University (1975)
- Gabrielle Léger Lifetime Achievement Award (1994)

== See also ==
- Harold Lea Fetherstonhaugh
- Raymond Moriyama
