= Humphrey Carver =

Canadian planner

- Born: 29 November 1902; Harborne, United Kingdom
- Died: 19 October 1995 (aged 92); Ottawa, Ontario, Canada
- Education: Corpus Christi College, Oxford; Architectural Association School of Architecture
- Occupations: Architect, urban planner
- Organization: Canada Mortgage and Housing Corporation
- Spouses: Mary Gordon (m. 1933–1948); Anne Sedgewick (m. 1951)

Humphrey Stephen Mumford Carver OC (29 November 1902 – 19 October 1995) was a Canadian architect and urban planner, who served as the first urban policy advisor of the Canada Mortgage and Housing Corporation. He was also instrumental in reviving the Canadian community planning profession and shaping Canada into a suburban nation.

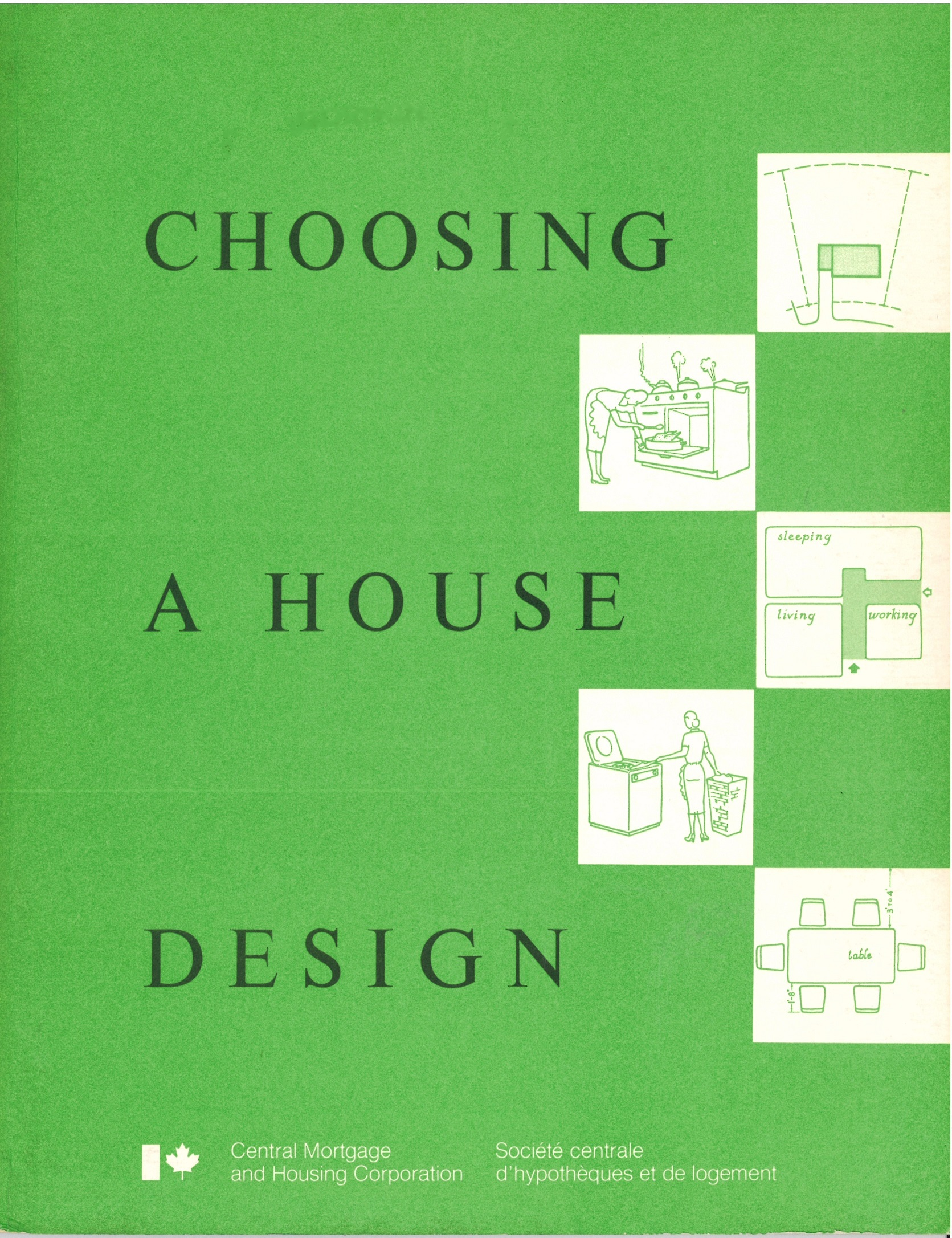
Choosing a House Design, 1976

== Early life and education ==
Humphrey Carver was born in Harborne, a suburb of Birmingham, UK in 1902. His father, Frank (1860–1943), and his mother, Ann Creswell, were born in Gibraltar and ran a small export business. Humphrey followed his brothers to Rugby School, and then Oxford, where he was inspired to become a housing advocate by reading about the founding of London's Hampstead Garden Suburb and the Garden City Movement. From 1924 to 1929, Carver studied at the Architectural Association School of Architecture in London, living in a settlement house in East London, then Hampstead Garden Suburb and Chelsea. Although it taught architecture in the classical style, Carver was influenced by Le Corbusier's books and became an early convert to Modernism. In 1930, after a dull year as a junior architect in London, he emigrated to Canada.

Carver got a job at Wilson, Bunnell & Borgstrom, Town Planners and Landscape Architects, but he was out of work within a year, after the Canadian planning movement collapsed early in the Depression. He formed a small landscape firm with Carl Borgstrom and was one of the founding members of the Canadian Society of Landscape Architects in 1934.

== See also ==
- List of Canadian planners

== Bibliography ==
- Carver, H. 1990s. Humphrey Carver fonds. Canadian Centre for Architecture, Montreal, collection 020.
- Carver, H. 1948. Houses for Canadians, University of Toronto Press.
- Carver, H. 1962. Cities in the Suburbs, University of Toronto Press.
- Carver, H. 1975. Compassionate Landscape, University of Toronto Press.
- Carver, H. 1994. Decades: A Personal Report on the Past Century, Ottawa: Topcopy.
- Gordon, D.L.A. 2018. Humphrey Carver and the federal government’s postwar revival of Canadian community planning. Urban History Review, 46(2), pp.71-84. https://doi.org/10.7202/1064834ar

League for Social Reconstruction Research Committee, 1935. Social Planning for Canada. University of Toronto Press, chp 19.
