= Samuel Gitterman =

Canadian architect and urban planner

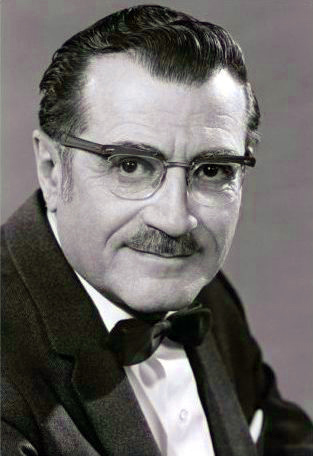
- Born: 1911; Montreal, QC
- Died: 1998 (age 87); Ottawa, ON
- Education: Baron Byng High School; McGill School of Architecture
- Occupations: Architect and urban planner
- Organization(s): Canada Mortgage and Housing Corporation

Samuel A. Gitterman (1911–1998) was a Canadian architect and urban planner, who served as the first Chief Architect and Planner of the Canada Mortgage and Housing Corporation. Over his career, Gitterman was responsible for designing low-income public housing, private single-family detached homes, and major suburban subdivisions across Canada. Gitterman also played a central role in early Canadian housing research and the development of urban planning as a stand-alone academic discipline.

== Early life and education ==
Samuel Gitterman was born in Montreal, Quebec in 1911 to Pearl (née Zolotareva) and Abraham Gitterman, Jewish immigrants from Odesa, Ukraine. His father, Abraham, who had become a successful customer peddler, died in 1924 when Samuel was only 13 years old. His mother, Pearl, lost much of what she had earned from investing in local apartments during the Great Depression. As a teenager, Gitterman attended Baron Byng High School, an English-language school in Montreal's Plateau-Mont-Royal neighbourhood, with a student population dominated by Jewish first- and second-generation immigrants.

After completing high school in 1928, Gitterman applied for a position at McGill's School of Architecture. Despite his excellent high school grades, Gitterman initially did not qualify for enrollment at McGill due to the university's strict Jewish quotas. Gitterman took another year of high school, completed additional examinations, and gained admission to the university in 1930. Gitterman's studies at McGill were supported by an interest-free loan provided to low-income Jewish students by Samuel Bronfman. After four years at McGill, Gitterman graduated at the top of his class and won several scholarships and prizes, including the first Gold Medal awarded by the Royal Architectural Institute of Canada. Gitterman also received a certificate in sandwich panel construction from the Massachusetts Institute of Technology.

== Career ==
=== Early career ===
In the summer of 1935, immediately after graduating from university, Gitterman was hired by a Montreal architecture firm led by Maxwell Kalman, which focused primarily on designing lower-cost small houses. The designs developed by Gitterman and other architects at Kalman's firm tended to have more consistency in size and appearance than many of the homes that were being built in Montreal into the 1930s: The firm almost always constructed wooden-framed houses that were 1,000 to 1,500 sq. ft. in size, being either one-and-a-half or two stories. During his time at Kalman's firm, Gitterman also designed some larger and more expensive homes costing at times as much as $10,000 per house (around three times the cost of an average home during the Depression).

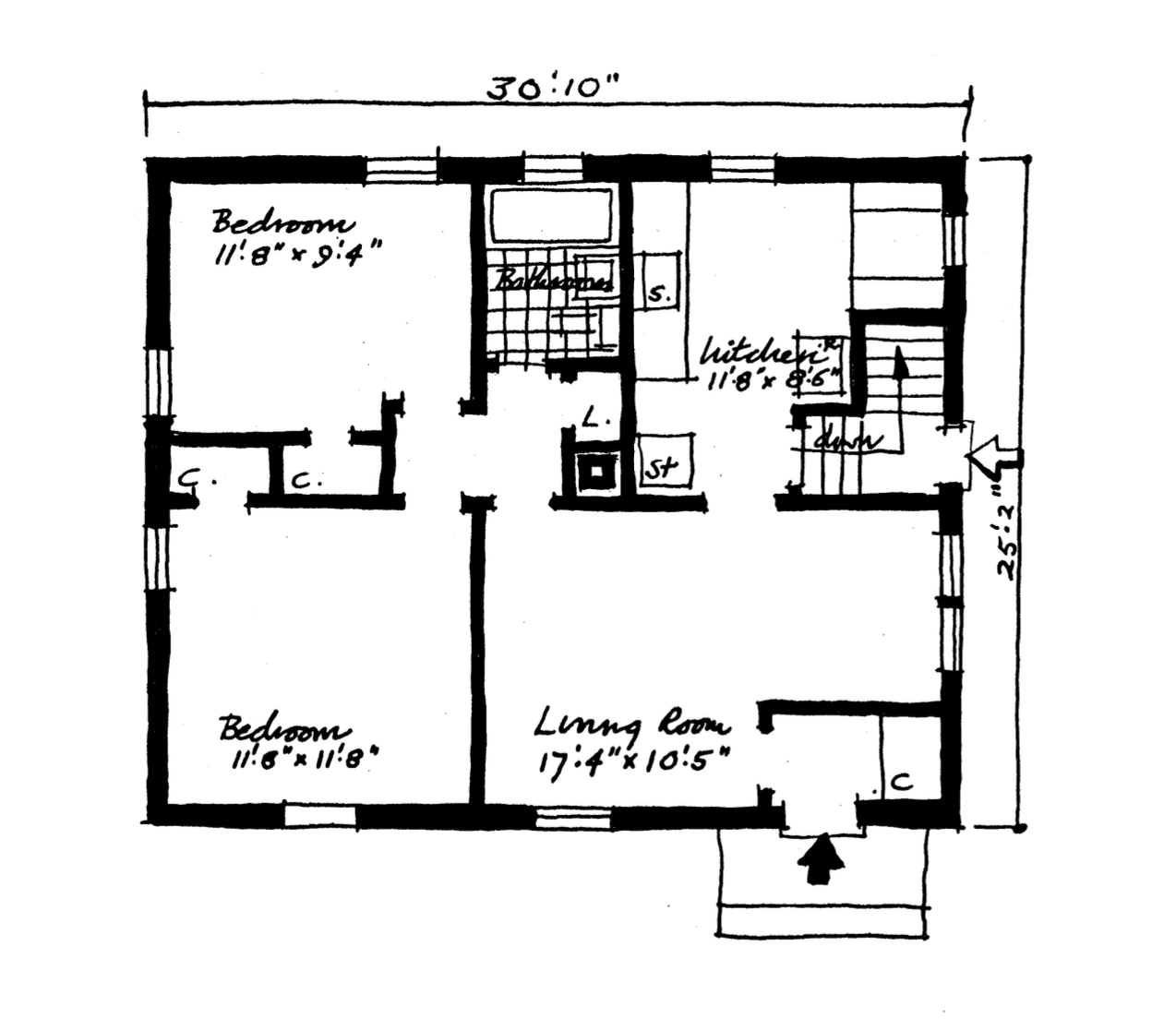
A design for a small semi-prefabricated house for the Department of National Defense. Although the authoring architect of this particular design is unknown, Gitterman created many similar small house designs on behalf of the DND.

In 1937, Gitterman moved to Ottawa and began developing designs for small semi-prefabricated houses for the Department of National Defence. Unlike traditional houses, these ‘pre-fabs’, used by the military, consisted of standardized components that could fit together like a puzzle, be constructed in 36 hours, and easily be dismantled and reassembled elsewhere if need be.

After two years at the DND, Gitterman transferred to the position of Assistant Architect at the Land Planning Division of the National Housing Administration, an organization within the federal Department of Finance that provided loans for owner-occupied house construction across Canada. At the NHA, Gitterman began overseeing a program known as the “Home Conversion Plan”, through which homeowners would be given grants to upgrade the quality of their houses, as an attempt from the federal government to develop nationwide standardization and safety in construction.

In addition to his primary responsibilities at the NHA, Gitterman also became a judge for the organization's annual small house design competition, which ran for four decades. Hundreds of Canadian architects and architectural students submitted designs to NHA's competition and winners would have their designs included in a catalogue, receiving prize money and royalties for each copy of the design sold. Controversially, on a handful of occasions, from the 1930s into the 1960s, Gitterman also submitted his personal house designs to the competition and won, despite "having a definite say in what plans should be published in the CMHC catalogues”.

=== Wartime Housing ===
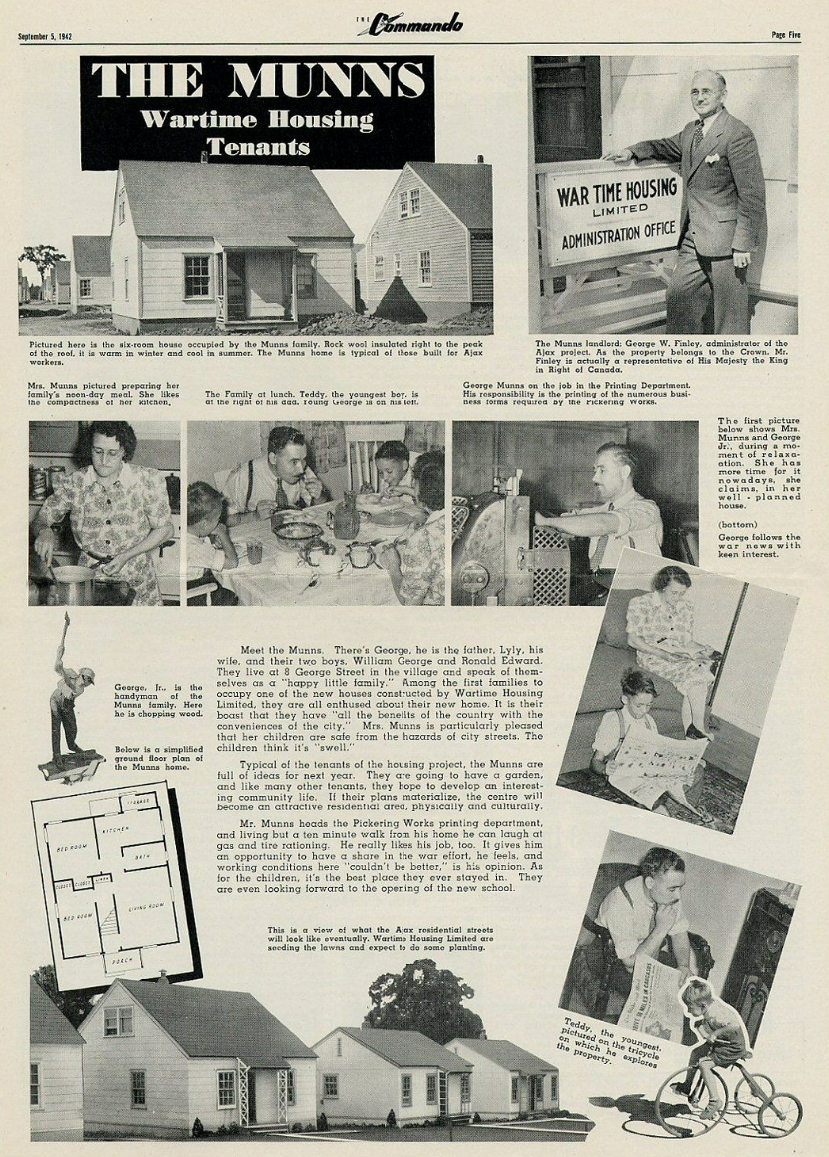
A newsletter advertisement for a Wartime Housing Limited-built and CMHC-administered development in Ajax, Ontario. The later-stages of planning for Ajax were overseen by Samuel Gitterman.

The economic boom of the Second World War, a need for new housing near military bases, and a desire amongst Canadians for single-family private homes brought a rapid growth in suburban subdivision development. Wartime Housing Ltd., a federal crown corporation, took over many of the responsibilities from the National Housing Administration and began to rapidly develop subdivisions for war workers and their families near military sites across Canada. Over a five-year period, WHL constructed almost 26,000 rental units to house war workers, along with primary and secondary schools, fire stations, and community centres to support them and their families.

In 1941, Frank Nicolls, the director of the NHA, approached Gitterman about the possibility of creating a community planning department within the NHA that could provide a “sound scientific, statistical base” for both wartime military, civilian and war worker housing and the expected need for low- and moderate-income post-war private developments. In the same year, the National Building Code was published, providing for the first time, formal rules for the standardization and safety of construction. In 1943, the NHA established a Town Planning Division and appointed Gitterman as the department head. In this role, Gitterman's focus shifted from creating architectural plans for individual houses to planning entire subdivisions, most notably, La Cité-jardin du Tricentenaire (Tricentennial Garden-City) in Montreal's Rosemont—La-Petite-Patrie borough and the Crawford Park Extension in Verdun.

=== Work at the Canada Mortgage and Housing Corporation ===
Immediately following the end of the Second World War, the Central Mortgage and Housing Corporation (today called the Canada Mortgage and Housing Corporation) was developed out of the National Housing Administration and other federal crown housing corporations, including Wartime Housing Ltd., to provide a single federal entity for providing loans and overseeing publicly-funded development. In 1946, Gitterman was transferred to the CMHC and appointed as the Corporation's first Chief Architect and Planner.

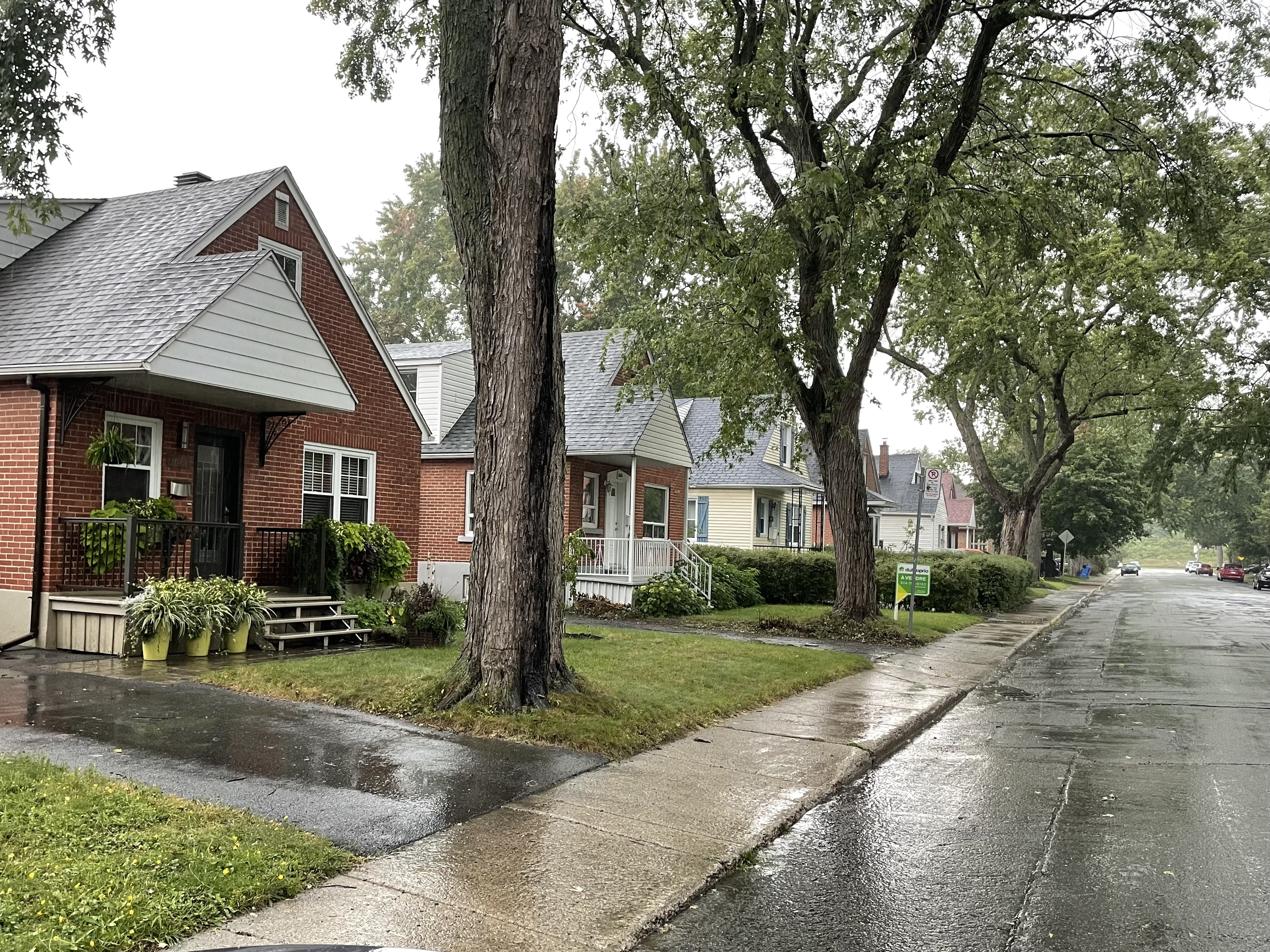
A line of small single-family houses in the Crawford Park Extension, in Verdun, Montreal. This subdivision was one of Gitterman's first urban plans, undertaken while at the NHA in the early 1940s.

Despite working for the new organization, Gitterman's role at the CMHC remained similar to his previous work, and he continued to oversee the development of military housing for the Army, Navy, and Air Force; public housing, such as Regent Park North; veterans housing; townsites, like Ajax, Ontario; and housing in the arctic and northern Canada.

In the mid-1950s, the CMHC was tasked by the Department of National Defense to design the New Town of Oromocto as a residential area for married soldiers stationed at the newly constructed CFB Gagetown in New Brunswick. Alongside Harold Spence-Sales, a British urban planner based at McGill, Gitterman oversaw the planning of four 500-unit neighbourhoods. In total, 2,000 units were constructed in Oromocto for military families, along with five elementary schools and two junior high schools, additional units for non-military families, and a town centre containing stores and recreational facilities.

In addition to his primary responsibility overseeing development, as Chief Architect and Planner, Gitterman wrote and lectured on planning principles for the CMHC, such as the importance of the Neighbourhood Unit and Garden City ideals in suburban subdivision planning. Gitterman recognized planning as essential to ensuring safe and organized communities, where residents could "live and make a living" in comfort. Gitterman's larger subdivision plans, including for the Town of Oromocto, NB, closely followed mid-20th century planning principals, first proposed by planners like Ebenezer Howard and Clarence Perry. This includes his use 'housing groups' within neighourhoods, developed through cul-de-sacs and walking paths between and at the rear of homes, as well as public recreational spaces, schools, and churches to spur the development of neighbourhood community, culture, and safety.

In 1954, following Stewart Bates's appointment to President of the CMHC, Gitterman was chosen as the Advisor on Housing Construction (technology advisor) for the newly created Advisory Research Group, headed by Humphery Carver. In this role, Gitterman's responsibilities shifted from overseeing planning to researching and developing for new housing technologies. Each year, beginning in the mid-1950s, a budget of around $10 million per year was set aside for housing research, allowing CMHC research team the luxury to develop a wide variety of prototypes with the goal of improving housing quality and construction methods while reducing long-term costs. Some research projects overseen by Gitterman at the time include an in-house water-recycling machine to make wastewater potable; a prototype house built with a wooden foundation; a new type of toilet; and a pre-assembled plastic bathroom.

=== Late career and retirement ===
After 5 years on the CMHC research advisory group, in 1959, Gitterman left the CMHC to open a private architecture and planning firm in Ottawa. His practice oversaw the construction of a number of developments, including MacDonald Manor, a low-income seniors’ estate; the Montclair a mid-rise apartment building in downtown Ottawa; and the Glen Cairn subdivision near Kanata.

In 1965, Gitterman returned to his advisory role at the CMHC, where he remained until experiencing a heart attack in 1974 and entered retirement. In the 1970s, Gitterman continued to consult on contracts for the Ministry of State for Urban Affairs, Department of Health and Welfare and the Canadian Executive Service Organization, among other federal organizations. During this time, Gitterman also participated in international development projects in Italy, Guatemala, Bangladesh, Botswana, Fiji and Malawi following major emergencies and natural disasters on behalf of the Canadian International Development Agency.

== Personal life ==
Following his move to Ottawa in the late 1930s, Gitterman met his wife, Belle, who was working as a secretary for the Department of Finance in the East Block on Parliament Hill. The couple married in the mid 1940s and had two sons, Allan and Lawrence. The family lived in the Manor Park neighbourhood northeast of Ottawa's downtown, in a house hand built by Gitterman. In the 1960s, Gitterman designed another house for his family, this time in the nearby Village of Rockcliffe Park, and the family moved there.

For two decades, beginning in 1976, Gitterman served as a volunteer planner and honorary municipal building inspector for Rockliffe Park, alongside his former CMHC colleague Humphrey Carver. During his retirement, Gitterman was inducted into the Canadian Home Builders' Association Hall of Fame and he received the CMHC Award for Outstanding Contribution to the Housing Industry. Gitterman died on January 3, 1998, at the age of 87. Following his death, Rockliffe Park planted a tree in his memory in the town square.
