= Thomas Adams (architect) =

British architect

- Born: 10 September 1871 near Edinburgh, Scotland
- Died: 24 March 1940 (aged 68); Battle, Sussex, England
- Occupation: Architect
- Projects: the Hydrostone section of Halifax, Nova Scotia

Thomas Adams (10 September 1871 – 24 March 1940) was a British architect who was a pioneer of urban planning in the UK and Canada.

== Life and career ==
Born on Meadowhouse Farm near Edinburgh to dairy farmers James and Margaret Adams, he was educated at Daniel Stewart's College in Edinburgh and was a farmer in his early years. Adams moved to London where he worked as a journalist. He served as secretary to the Garden City Association and was the first manager of Letchworth, England, from 1903 to 1906.

Adams became a designer of low-density residential developments that were commonly referred to as "garden suburbs." In 1909–1914, Adams worked as Town Planning Adviser to the Local Government Board. In 1914, he was invited to Canada to work for the Commission of Conservation to provide better housing for the growing population of industrial cities. After the Halifax Explosion in 1917, Adams designed the Hydrostone section using Garden City principles. In the same year he published Rural planning and development: a study of rural conditions and problems in Canada, one of the earliest books to advocate the use of land use controls. He also designed a portion of Corner Brook, Newfoundland. He worked with Halifax architect Andrew R. Cobb on this project. On other projects in Quebec and Nova Scotia he partnered with Ross and Macdonald of Montreal. He was later responsible for surveys and a plan for New York City. From 1923 to 1930 he was a director of the Regional Plan of New York. The plan was published in 1929 and anticipated the region's basic transportation and infrastructure needs for the next 30 years.

On returning to the United Kingdom, Thomas Adams became one of the early presidents of the Institute of Landscape Architects (ILA) which became the Landscape Institute. In 1932, he was asked by Massachusetts Institute of Technology architect William Emerson to design a city planning curriculum for the university. His son, Frederick Adams, was nominated by Emerson to be the first department head of City Planning at the MIT and was named a "Pioneer Planner" by the American Institute of Certified Planners. Towards the end of his life, Adams served as a visiting lecturer in his son's new department. He took an active role in creating planning institutions in Great Britain, Canada and the United States. In Canada, Adams is recognized as a National Historic Person.

== See also ==
- Témiscaming, Quebec
- Jasper Park Lodge
- Distinguished Canadian Planners
