= Hydrostone =

- Neighbourhood
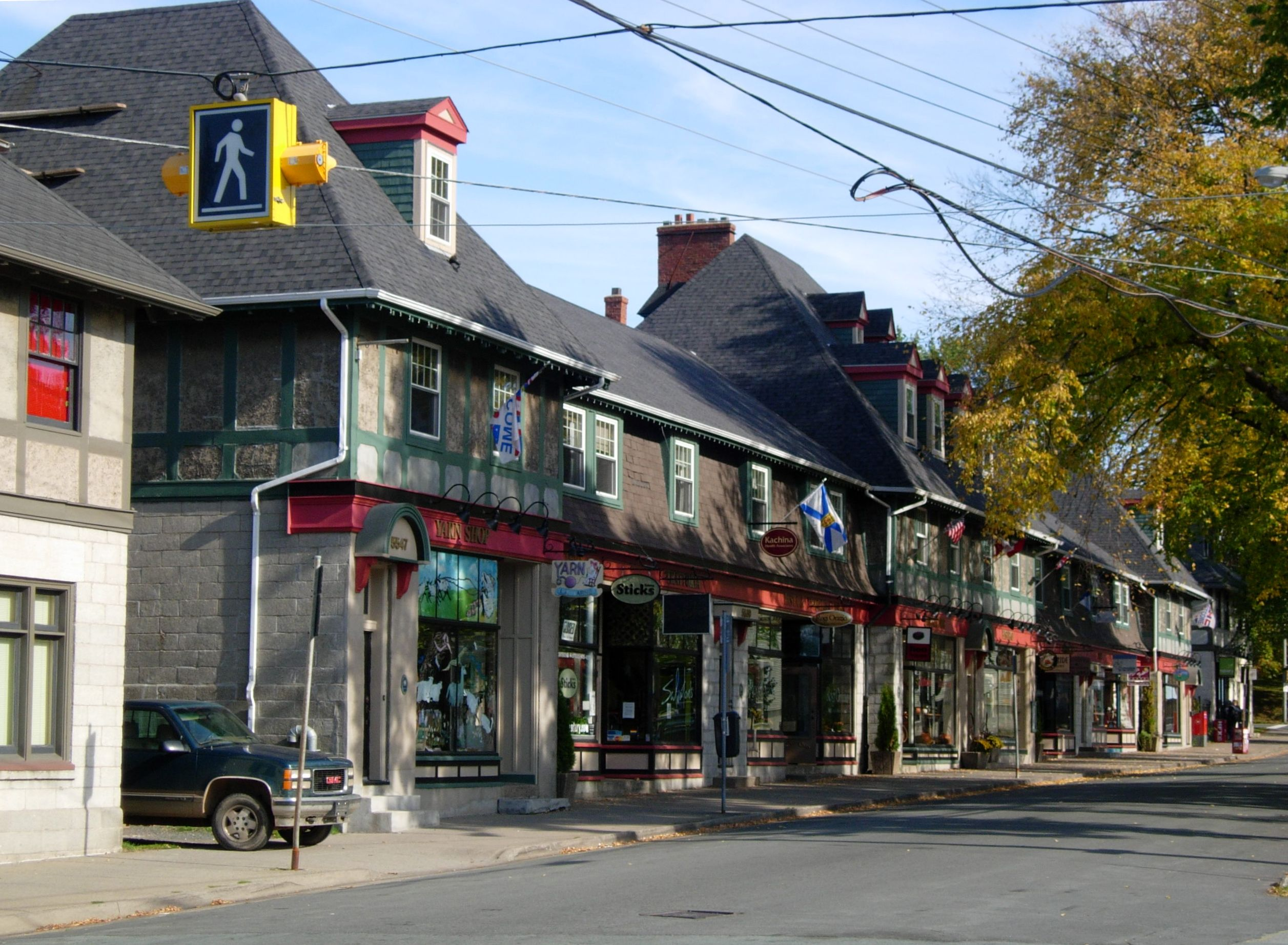
- Storefronts in the Hydrostone district of Halifax
- Interactive map of Hydrostone
- Coordinates: 44°39′52″N 63°36′10″W
- Country: Canada
- Province: Nova Scotia
- Municipality: Halifax Regional Municipality
- Community: Halifax

Government
  - Council: Peninsula North

Area
  - Total: 9.3 ha (23 acres)
- Time zone: UTC−04:00 (AST)
- Postal codes: B3K
- Area code: 902
- Part of a series about Places in Nova Scotia

National Historic Site of Canada
- Official name: Hydrostone District National Historic Site of Canada
- Designated: 1993

Hydrostone is a neighbourhood in the North End of the Halifax Peninsula in the Halifax Regional Municipality, Nova Scotia, Canada. It consists of ten short parallel streets and is bordered by Duffus Street to the north, Young Street to the south, Isleville Street to the west and Novalea Drive to the east. The Hydrostone District has about 9.3 ha (23 acres) of landmass.

The neighbourhood was designed by architect Thomas Adams to provide housing for working-class families displaced by the Halifax Explosion in 1917. Architectural design was by George Ross of the Montreal architectural firm of Ross and Macdonald. The neighbourhood draws its name from the special cinderblocks from which the houses were constructed. Most of the dwellings are row-houses in groups of four and six, except for the large, two-storey single-family houses at the eastern end of each street. Some have been converted to sets of flats.

All of the streets in the Hydrostone are boulevards except Stanley Place. These boulevards have treed, grassy strips which serve as communal outdoor space for the neighbourhood. This is consistent with the Garden city movement by which Adams was influenced. All streets are also served by back lanes, a feature characteristic of Western Canadian cities, but not usually found in Eastern Canadian communities.

It is designated a National Historic Site of Canada.

== Construction ==
Following the Halifax Explosion, many of the wood-frame buildings collapsed on their coal stoves and furnaces and caught on fire, which was a concern when reconstruction was being planned. To minimize the danger of fire, Adams and Ross proposed the use of non-combustible hydrostone for the reconstruction of this area.

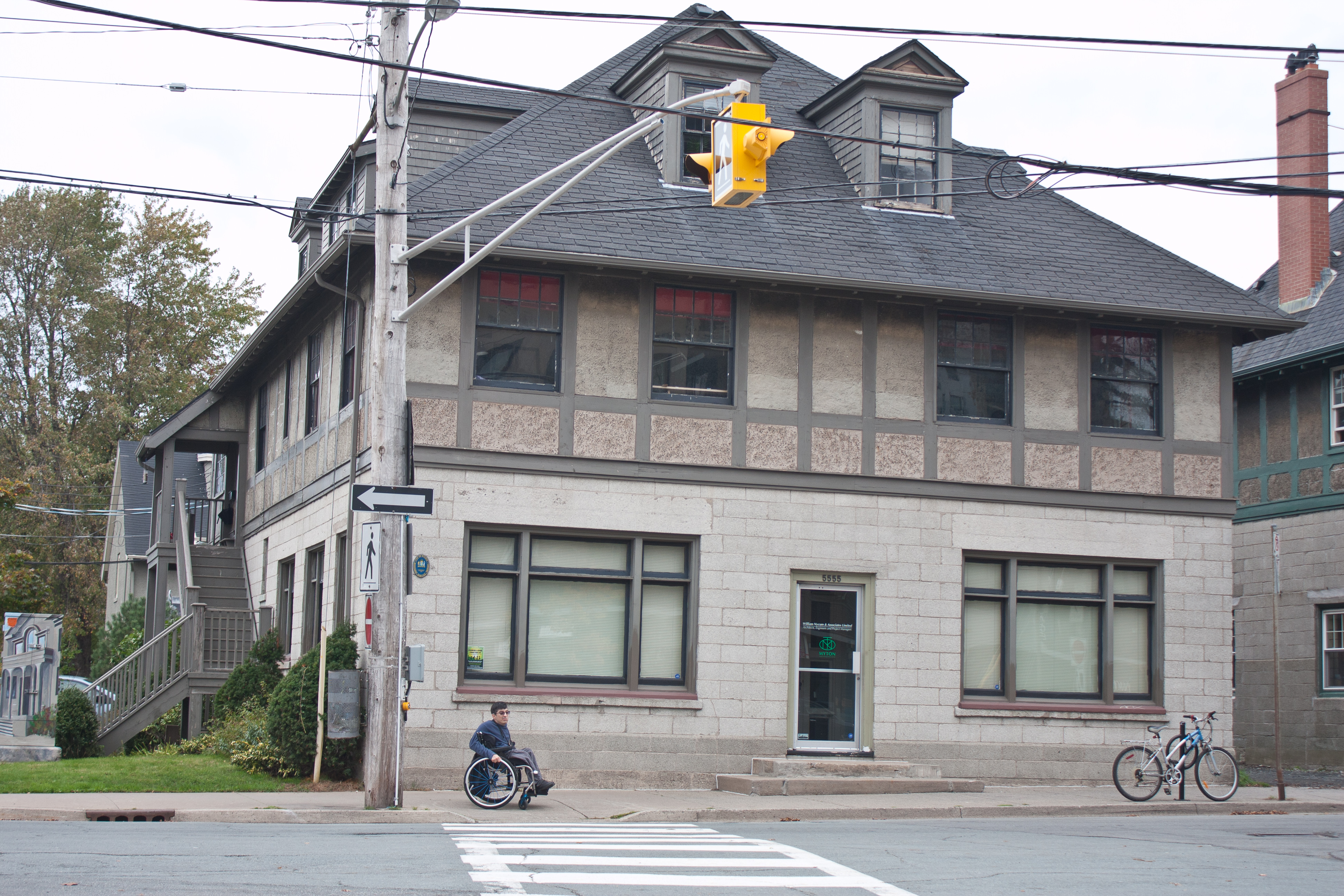
Most of the buildings in Hydrostone were built to minimize the dangers of fires, a consequence of the Halifax Explosion.

Hydrostone was a concrete block that was finished with crushed rock (granite, in this case) to approximate the appearance of cut-stone construction. The concrete blocks and their faces were amalgamated through a hydraulic pressing process, patented by a Chicago firm. Manufacture of the blocks was done in a plant located in Eastern Passage and the finished stones were hauled across Halifax Harbour by barge.

Transporting the stones to the construction site was problematic, due to the steep rise from the harbour. To solve this problem and make the area more easily accessible, two diagonal streets were included in the Richmond district reconstruction plans: Devonshire Street / Avenue and Dartmouth Avenue.

== The Hydrostone today ==
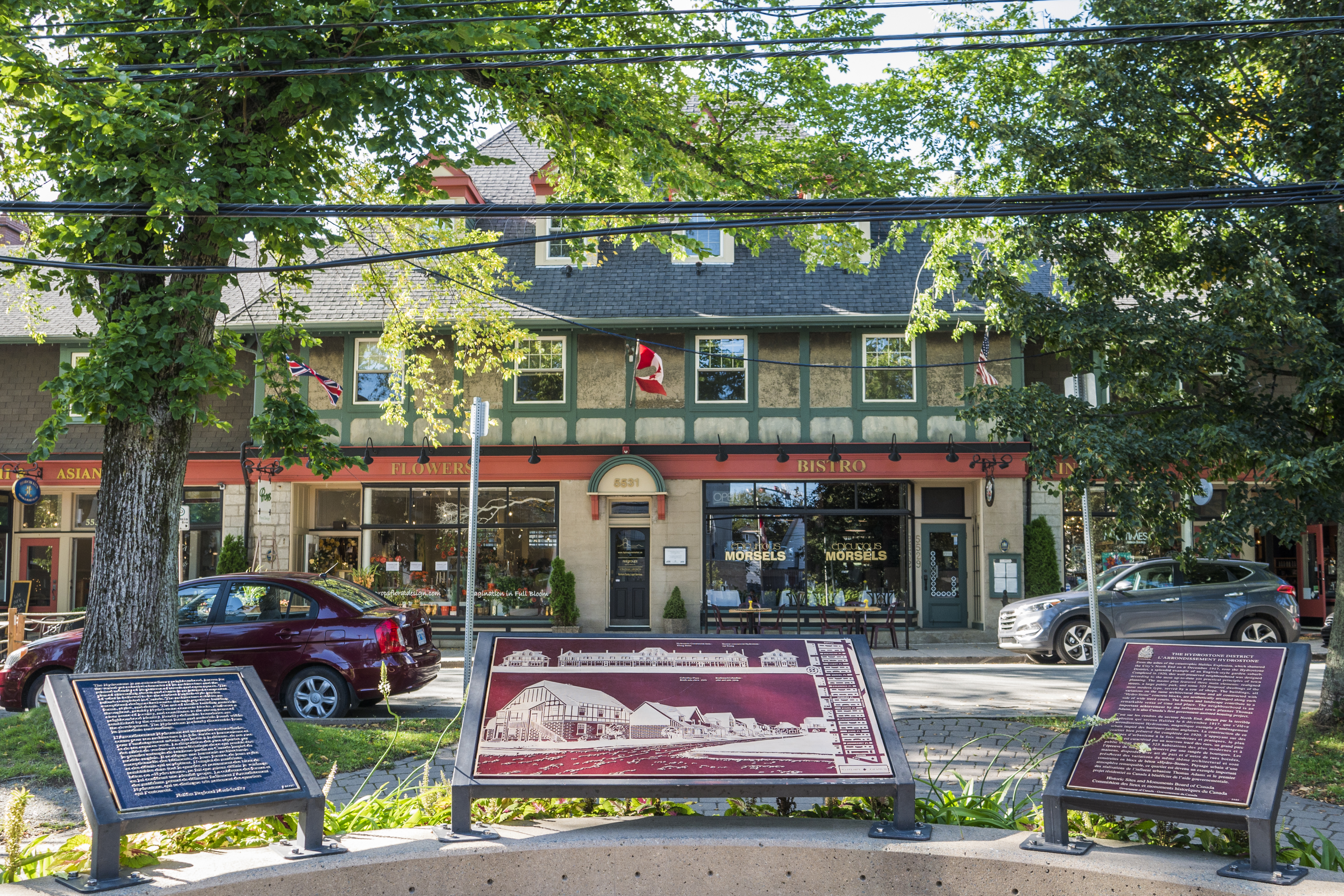
The neighbourhood has experienced a wave of gentrification, as young professionals and small families move into the area.

Today, the Hydrostone is considered by many to be a gentrified location, sought after by young professionals and small families for its green space and proximity to shops and transit. Trends have indicated that that many longtime residents have relocated due to property value increases driven by population growth.

In 2011, the Canadian Institute of Planners named the Hydrostone the Second Greatest Neighbourhood in its inaugural Great Places in Canada contest.
