= Hans Blumenfeld =

German Canadian architect and city planner

- Born: October 18, 1892; Osnabrück, Germany
- Died: January 30, 1988 (aged 95); Toronto, Ontario
- Occupation(s): urban and regional planner

Hans Blumenfeld, OC (October 18, 1892 – January 30, 1988) was a German-Canadian architect and city planner.

== Early life and education ==
Blumenfeld was born in Osnabruck, Germany in 1892 and grew up in Hamburg. He did not follow in his family's footsteps into the banking industry, instead opting to pursue a career in architecture. He started out as a carpenter's apprentice. In 1914 he joined the German army during World War I. Following the war, he continued his studies and finished his master's degree.

== Career ==
In 1924 he emigrated to the US and worked in New York and Baltimore as a draftsman, and then moved to Los Angeles to work as a designer.

Blumenfeld published many articles on economic and social effects of planning with the emphasis on interdependence of physical, social and economic renewal. In 1967, his book The Modern Metropolis, Its Origins, Growth, Characteristics, and Planning: Selected Essays by Hans Blumenfeld was published. In 1987, his book Life Begins at 65: The Not Entirely Candid Autobiography of a Drifter was published. In 1978, he was made an Officer of the Order of Canada.
