= Jeanne Wolfe =

Canadian urban planner (1934–2009)

Jeanne Wolfe (1934–2009) was a British-born Canadian urban planner and scholar known for her outstanding contribution to planning affairs in Quebec, Canada, and internationally.

== Biography ==
Wolfe received a bachelor's degree in Geography from the University of London, UK (1953–56), a master's degree in Geography from the University of Western Ontario in London, Ontario (1956–59), and a master's degree in Urban Planning from McGill University in Montréal (1959–61).

Following her graduation from McGill, Wolfe practiced for over a decade as a professional planner, holding positions with both the City of Montreal and the Quebec Government's Ministry of Municipal Affairs. In 1973, Wolfe joined the faculty of the McGill School of Urban Planning. While at McGill, she developed courses in the history, theory and practice of urban planning, taught numerous planning studio courses (interdisciplinary, team-based practical planning projects) in collaboration with public and community partners, and supervised countless graduate students. Wolfe was Director of the McGill School of Urban Planning between 1988 and 1999, and given the honorific title of Professor Emerita following her retirement.

Wolfe was a prolific and accomplished researcher and writer. Among her achievements are reviews about Canadian planning and housing policy, and articles documenting the evolution of Montreal's governance structure. She also extensively studied urban and social issues in developing countries and late in her life, she worked on a history of utopian communities across Canada.

In addition to her research, Wolfe participated in many social and environmental organizations and commissions, both locally and nationally. For example, she was a commissioner for both the 1986 Parizeau Commission on the Future of Municipalities and the 1987 commission for the Musée des beaux-arts de Montréal. She was also a long-serving board member for the Society to Overcome Pollution (1979 to 2009).

For the last 25 years of her life, Wolfe was deeply involved in planning research and practice in developing countries, particularly in the Caribbean basin and in Central America. She was a founding member of the Groupe interuniversitaire de Montréal, a Centre of Excellence of the Canadian International Development Agency, which helped to establish post-secondary urban-planning programs in local universities and to develop their research capacity. In recent years, she worked in China and in India, studying and advising on local planning and governance structures, for instance with respect to solid-waste management (in India) and metropolitan governance (in China).

Wolfe was appointed a member of the Order of Canada in May 2009 for "her contributions as a leading scholar and mentor in the field of urban planning in Canada and abroad."

== Honours ==
- Professor Emeritus in Urban Planning at McGill University (2000)
- Prix Jean-Claude La Haye, Ordre des urbanistes du Québec (2004)
- President's Award, Canadian Institute of Planners (2007)
- Member of the Order of Canada (2009)

== See also ==
- Distinguished Canadian Planners
