= Canadian Architecture Collection =

Unit of McGill University Library

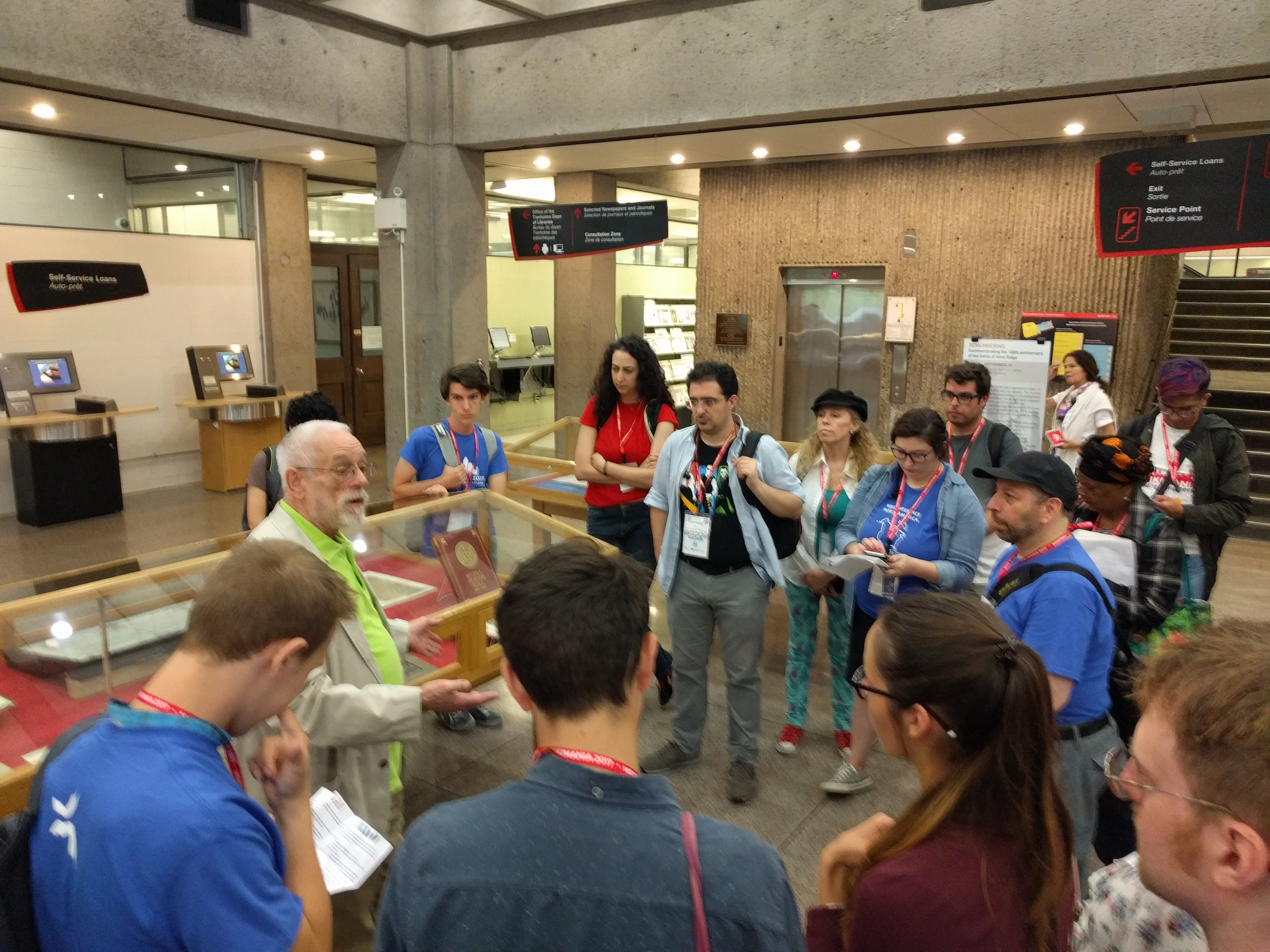
- Tour of the CAC, 2017
- Interactive map of Canadian Architecture Collection
- 45°30′11″N 73°34′42″W
- Alternative name: John Bland Canadian Architecture Collection
- Location: 3459 McTavish Street, Montreal, H3A 0C9, Canada
- Type: Architectural archives
- Affiliation: McGill University Libraries
- Website: https://archivalcollections.library.mcgill.ca/canadian-architecture-collection

The John Bland Canadian Architecture Collection is a unit of McGill University Library specializing in the conservation and curation of Canadian architectural archives. Its mandate is to document the past and present work of architects who studied or taught at the McGill University School of Architecture.

== Description ==
The collection was created by John Bland, then director of McGill School of Architecture, in 1974. To date, it contains more than 100 archival fonds documenting renowned Canadian architects such as Edward Maxwell, Moshe Safdie or Harold Lea Fetherstonhaugh through their correspondence, architectural drawings, plans and photographs concerning their realizations.

Architectural historian France Gagnon-Pratte used the collection in writing her 1987 book Country Houses for Montrealers, 1892-1924 : the architecture of E. and W.S. Maxwell, after which she donated her working notes and photographs.

== Contents of the collection ==
Fonds	Inventory Number	URL
A. Leslie Perry fonds	95	https://www.archivalcollections.library.mcgill.ca/index.php/a-leslie-perry
Alexander Francis Dunlop	16	https://archivalcollections.library.mcgill.ca/index.php/alexander-francis-dunlop
Alexander Tilloch Galt Durnford	11	https://www.archivalcollections.library.mcgill.ca/index.php/alexander-tilloch-galt-durnford
Alvaro Ortega	35	https://www.archivalcollections.library.mcgill.ca/index.php/alvaro-ortega
Archibald and Illsley	4.03	https://www.archivalcollections.library.mcgill.ca/index.php/archibald-and-illsley
Archibald, Illsley and Templeton	4.02	https://www.archivalcollections.library.mcgill.ca/index.php/archibald-illsley-and-templeton
Arthur Erickson	57	https://www.archivalcollections.library.mcgill.ca/index.php/arthur-erickson
Barott and Blackader	83	https://archivalcollections.library.mcgill.ca/index.php/barott-and-blackader
Bland, Lemoyne, Edwards	41.08	https://www.archivalcollections.library.mcgill.ca/index.php/bland-lemoyne-edwards
Bland, Lemoyne, Edwards, Shine	41.09	https://www.archivalcollections.library.mcgill.ca/index.php/bland-lemoyne-edwards-shine
Bland, LeMoyne, Shine	41.1	https://www.archivalcollections.library.mcgill.ca/index.php/bland-lemoyne-shine
Bland, Lemoyne, Shine, Lacroix	41.11	https://www.archivalcollections.library.mcgill.ca/index.php/bland-lemoyne-shine-lacroix
Bland, Rother and Trudeau	41.06	https://www.archivalcollections.library.mcgill.ca/index.php/bland-rother-and-trudeau
Bobrow Architects	74	https://www.archivalcollections.library.mcgill.ca/index.php/bobrow-architects
Bolton, Chadwick, Ellwood and Aimers	11.04	https://www.archivalcollections.library.mcgill.ca/index.php/bolton-chadwick-ellwood-and-aimers
Bolton, Ellwood and Aimers	11.05	https://www.archivalcollections.library.mcgill.ca/index.php/bolton-ellwood-and-aimers
Brown, MacVicar and Heriot	10.02	https://www.archivalcollections.library.mcgill.ca/index.php/brown-macvicar-and-heriot
Bruce Haken Wright	27	https://www.archivalcollections.library.mcgill.ca/index.php/bruce-haken-wright
Cardwell Ross Anderson	42	https://www.archivalcollections.library.mcgill.ca/index.php/cardwell-ross-anderson
Cecil Scott Burgess	44	https://www.archivalcollections.library.mcgill.ca/index.php/cecil-scott-burgess
Charles Barry Fonds	12	https://www.archivalcollections.library.mcgill.ca/index.php/charles-barry
Charles Jewett Saxe	4.04	https://www.archivalcollections.library.mcgill.ca/index.php/charles-jewett-saxe
Charles Reginald Tetley	93	https://www.archivalcollections.library.mcgill.ca/index.php/charles-reginald-tetley
Cornelia Hahn Oberlander	68	https://www.archivalcollections.library.mcgill.ca/index.php/cornelia-hahn-oberlander
D.J. Spence	81	https://www.archivalcollections.library.mcgill.ca/index.php/d-j-spence
Daniel Wilson	31	https://archivalcollections.library.mcgill.ca/index.php/daniel-wilson
David Colville	13	https://archivalcollections.library.mcgill.ca/index.php/david-colville
David James Moir	36	https://www.archivalcollections.library.mcgill.ca/index.php/david-james-moir
David Robertson Brown and Hugh Vallance	10	https://www.archivalcollections.library.mcgill.ca/index.php/david-robertson-brown-and-hugh-vallance
Douglas Shadbolt	43	https://archivalcollections.library.mcgill.ca/index.php/douglas-shadbolt
Durnford, Bolton, Chadwick and Ellwood	11.03	https://www.archivalcollections.library.mcgill.ca/index.php/durnford-bolton-chadwick-and-ellwood
Edward and W.S. Maxwell	2.02	https://www.archivalcollections.library.mcgill.ca/index.php/edward-and-w-s-maxwell
Edward Colonna	15	https://www.archivalcollections.library.mcgill.ca/index.php/edward-colonna
Edward Maxwell	2	https://www.archivalcollections.library.mcgill.ca/index.php/edward-maxwell
F. David Mathias	82	https://archivalcollections.library.mcgill.ca/index.php/f-david-mathias
Fetherstonhaugh and Durnford	11.01	https://www.archivalcollections.library.mcgill.ca/index.php/fetherstonhaugh-and-durnford
Fetherstonhaugh, Durnford, Bolton and Chadwick	11.02	https://www.archivalcollections.library.mcgill.ca/index.php/fetherstonhaugh-durnford-bolton-and-chadwick
Findlay and McGregor	3.01	https://www.archivalcollections.library.mcgill.ca/index.php/findlay-and-mcgregor
Finley and Spence	80	https://archivalcollections.library.mcgill.ca/index.php/finley-and-spence
France Gagnon Pratte	66	https://archivalcollections.library.mcgill.ca/index.php/france-gagnon-pratte
Francis John Nobbs	6	https://www.archivalcollections.library.mcgill.ca/index.php/francis-john-nobbs
Francis Mawson Rattenbury	25	https://www.archivalcollections.library.mcgill.ca/index.php/francis-mawson-rattenbury
Francis R. Findlay	3.03	https://www.archivalcollections.library.mcgill.ca/index.php/francis-r-findlay
Francis R. Findlay and Percy Roy Wilson	3.04	https://www.archivalcollections.library.mcgill.ca/index.php/francis-r-findlay-and-percy-roy-wilson
Frank Pentland Chambers	14	https://www.archivalcollections.library.mcgill.ca/index.php/frank-pentland-chambers
Frederick G. Todd	5000	https://www.archivalcollections.library.mcgill.ca/index.php/frederick-g-todd
Frederick H. Gowings	53	https://www.archivalcollections.library.mcgill.ca/index.php/frederick-h-gowings
Frederick Taylor	63	https://www.archivalcollections.library.mcgill.ca/index.php/fred-taylor
G. E. Wilson	60	https://archivalcollections.library.mcgill.ca/index.php/g-e-wilson
George Manson Fisk	46	https://www.archivalcollections.library.mcgill.ca/index.php/george-manson-fisk
H. Ross Wiggs	90	https://www.archivalcollections.library.mcgill.ca/index.php/h-ross-wiggs
Harold Lea Fetherstonhaugh	17	https://www.archivalcollections.library.mcgill.ca/index.php/harold-lea-fetherstonhaugh
Harold Robert Little	37	https://archivalcollections.library.mcgill.ca/index.php/harold-robert-little
Harold Spence-Sales	97	The fonds is in the process of being cataloged a link will be added as soon as it has been published.
Harry Mayerovitch	47	https://www.archivalcollections.library.mcgill.ca/index.php/harry-mayerovitch
Harry Stilman	86	https://www.archivalcollections.library.mcgill.ca/index.php/harry-stilman
Henry Saxon Snell	78	https://www.archivalcollections.library.mcgill.ca/index.php/henry-saxon-snell
Herbert Raine	33	https://www.archivalcollections.library.mcgill.ca/index.php/herbert-raine
Hogle and Davis	9.01	https://www.archivalcollections.library.mcgill.ca/index.php/hogle-and-davis
Hugh Griffith Jones	19	https://archivalcollections.library.mcgill.ca/index.php/hugh-griffith-jones
Hugh McLennan	38	https://www.archivalcollections.library.mcgill.ca/index.php/hugh-mclennan
Hugh Vallance, Barott and Blackader	10.01	https://www.archivalcollections.library.mcgill.ca/index.php/hugh-vallance-barott-and-blackader
Hutchison and Steele	49	https://archivalcollections.library.mcgill.ca/index.php/hutchison-and-steele
Hutchison, Wood and Miller	50	https://www.archivalcollections.library.mcgill.ca/index.php/hutchison-wood-and-miller
James Cecil McDougall	22	https://www.archivalcollections.library.mcgill.ca/index.php/james-cecil-mcdougall
James O'Donnell	34	https://archivalcollections.library.mcgill.ca/index.php/james-odonnell
James R. Rhind	26	https://archivalcollections.library.mcgill.ca/index.php/james-r-rhind
Jerry Miller	89	https://www.archivalcollections.library.mcgill.ca/index.php/jerry-miller
John Bland - Slides	41.011	https://archivalcollections.library.mcgill.ca/index.php/john-bland-slides
John Scarlett Davis	40	https://www.archivalcollections.library.mcgill.ca/index.php/john-scarlett-davis
John Schreiber Fonds	28	https://www.archivalcollections.library.mcgill.ca/index.php/john-schreiber
John Scofield	94	https://www.archivalcollections.library.mcgill.ca/index.php/john-scofield
John Smith Archibald	4	https://www.archivalcollections.library.mcgill.ca/index.php/john-smith-archibald
John William Hopkins and Edward C. Hopkins	18	https://www.archivalcollections.library.mcgill.ca/index.php/john-william-hopkins-and-edward-c-hopkins
Kenneth Guscotte Rea	8	https://www.archivalcollections.library.mcgill.ca/index.php/kenneth-guscotte-rea
Kenneth Molson	87	https://www.archivalcollections.library.mcgill.ca/index.php/kenneth-molson
Lawford and Nelson	23.03	https://www.archivalcollections.library.mcgill.ca/index.php/lawford-and-nelson
MacVicar and Heriot	21.01	https://www.archivalcollections.library.mcgill.ca/index.php/macvicar-and-heriot
Maxwell and Pitts	2.03	https://www.archivalcollections.library.mcgill.ca/index.php/maxwell-and-pitts
Maxwell and Shattuck	2.01	https://www.archivalcollections.library.mcgill.ca/index.php/maxwell-and-shattuck
Moshe Safdie	58	https://archivalcollections.library.mcgill.ca/index.php/moshe-safdie
Nelson and Clift	23.02	https://www.archivalcollections.library.mcgill.ca/index.php/nelson-and-clift
Norbert Schoenauer	73	https://www.archivalcollections.library.mcgill.ca/index.php/norbert-schoenauer
One House for T.P. Howard	112b	https://www.archivalcollections.library.mcgill.ca/index.php/one-house-for-t-p-howard-2
Patrick McG. Stoker	75	https://www.archivalcollections.library.mcgill.ca/index.php/patrick-mcg-stoker
Peter Collins	64	https://www.archivalcollections.library.mcgill.ca/index.php/peter-collins
Philip Dalton Hepworth	39	https://www.archivalcollections.library.mcgill.ca/index.php/philip-dalton-hepworth
Philip John Turner	32	https://www.archivalcollections.library.mcgill.ca/index.php/philip-john-turner
Proposal of Alterations to Pulp and Paper Research Institute	368	https://www.archivalcollections.library.mcgill.ca/index.php/proposal-of-alterations-to-pulp-and-paper-research-institute-2
Proposal of Outbuildings for Dr. Todd	114	https://www.archivalcollections.library.mcgill.ca/index.php/proposal-of-outbuildings-for-dr-todd-2
Ramsay Traquair fonds	45	https://www.archivalcollections.library.mcgill.ca/index.php/ramsay-traquair
Raymond Affleck	62	https://www.archivalcollections.library.mcgill.ca/index.php/raymond-affleck
Robert and Francis R. Findlay	3.02	https://www.archivalcollections.library.mcgill.ca/index.php/robert-and-francis-r-findlay
Robert Findlay	3	https://www.archivalcollections.library.mcgill.ca/index.php/robert-findlay
Robert G. Calvert	89.06	
Ross and Macdonald	51.01	https://www.archivalcollections.library.mcgill.ca/index.php/ross-and-macdonald
Ross and MacFarlane	51	https://www.archivalcollections.library.mcgill.ca/index.php/ross-and-macfarlane
Ross, Fish, Duschenes and Barrett	51.02	https://www.archivalcollections.library.mcgill.ca/index.php/ross-fish-duschenes-and-barrett
Saxe and Archibald	4.01	https://www.archivalcollections.library.mcgill.ca/index.php/saxe-and-archibald
Saxe and Miller	48	https://www.archivalcollections.library.mcgill.ca/index.php/saxe-and-miller
Shimpei Nakano	54	
Sigrun Bülow-Hübe	65	https://archivalcollections.library.mcgill.ca/index.php/sigrun-bulow-hube
Smythe and Schyberg	84	
Spence and Mathias	79	
Taylor and Gordon	7	https://www.archivalcollections.library.mcgill.ca/index.php/taylor-and-gordon
Tolchinsky and Goodz	56	https://www.archivalcollections.library.mcgill.ca/index.php/tolchinsky-and-goodz
Two Houses for T.P. Howard	140	https://www.archivalcollections.library.mcgill.ca/index.php/two-houses-for-t-p-howard-5
Unidentified Architects	30	https://www.archivalcollections.library.mcgill.ca/index.php/unidentified-architects
Vincent Rother Architects	41.05	https://www.archivalcollections.library.mcgill.ca/index.php/vincent-rother-architects
Walter Scott Painter	24	https://www.archivalcollections.library.mcgill.ca/index.php/walter-scott-painter
Werleman Guy McMahon	92	https://www.archivalcollections.library.mcgill.ca/index.php/werleman-guy-mcmahon
William McLea Walbank	20	https://www.archivalcollections.library.mcgill.ca/index.php/william-mclea-walbank
William Sutherland Maxwell	2.04	https://www.archivalcollections.library.mcgill.ca/index.php/william-sutherland-maxwell
Wright and Noxon	27.01	https://www.archivalcollections.library.mcgill.ca/index.php/wright-and-noxon

== Notes and references ==
- Content in this edit is translated from the existing French Wikipedia article at Collection d'architecture canadienne; see its history for attribution.
