= Harold Spence-Sales =

Canadian architect and urban planner

Harold John Author Spence-Sales, (October 22, 1907 – March 15, 2004) was a British-born Canadian architect and urban planner. He is best known for creating the first university planning program in Canada at McGill University, and for playing an important role in shaping the urban landscape of the country. Spence-Sales left an impression on every province in the country and his mark on planning legislation.

== Personal life and education ==
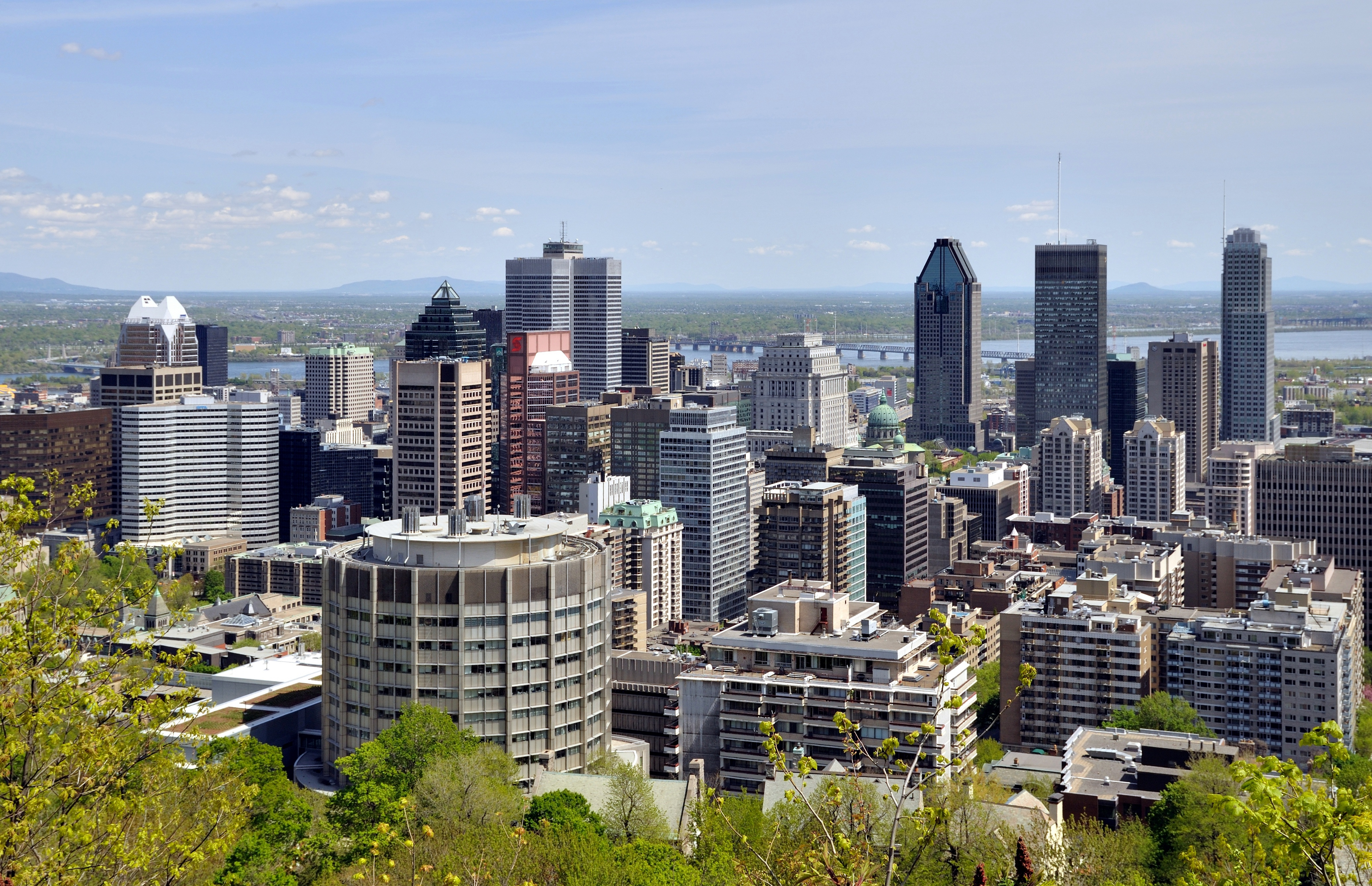
Montreal's Skyline.

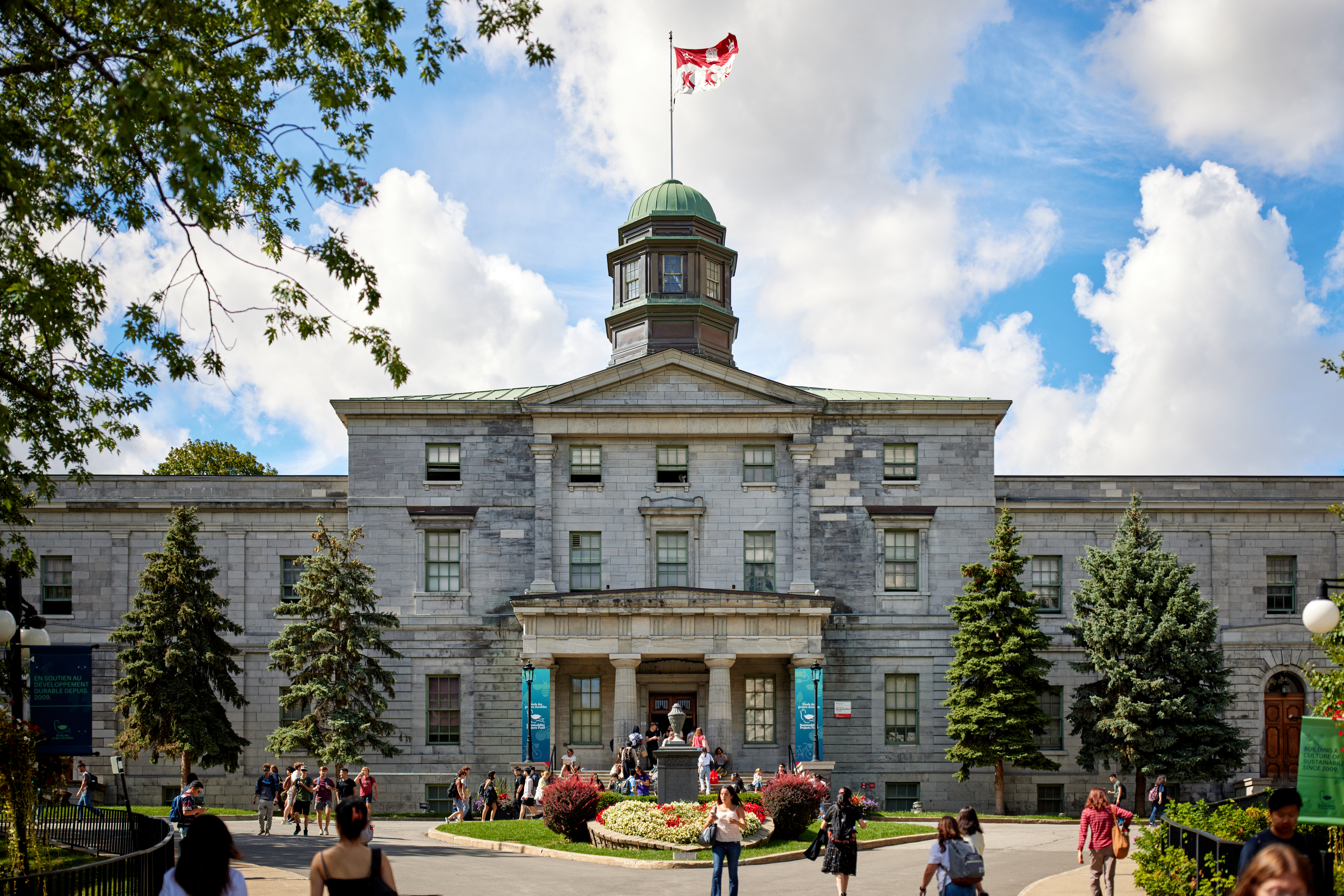
McGill University Arts Building.

Spence-Sales was born in Lahore, India (today Lahore, Pakistan) on October 22, 1907. He studied architecture at Victoria College in Wellington, New Zealand, and town planning at the Architectural Association in London, England. He had two children from his first marriage. In 1946, Spence-Sales moved with his family from London to Montreal, Quebec so he could take up a position as an instructor at McGill University's School of Architecture.

In 1983, Spence-Sales married his second wife Mary Filer, a Canadian artist. The couple moved to Victoria, British Columbia in 1970. In 1982, they purchased the property 1107 West 7th Avenue in Vancouver which was once a Purdy's Chocolate Factory. They converted the factory into their home and personal art studios. Converting the Purdy's Chocolate factory into a home and art studio space had an influence on Spence-Sales decision to pursue art as a major pastime.

== Career ==
After completing his studies at the Architectural Association, Spence-Sales began practicing as an architect and urban planner in London. He also worked as an instructor at the Architectural Association schools of planning and architecture between 1937 and 1946. Additionally, he taught at the London Polytechnic Institutions department of architecture in 1946. Today the London Polytechnique institution is called the University of Westminster.

During the Second World War, Spence-Sales worked for the war effort and held the following titles between 1938 and 1946: “Coordination Officer, Deputy Director and Inspector”. His primary role was, “designing sites for factories for war materials, and later on, reconstruction schemes”. He also worked on secret plans for the government related to the evacuation of London and other surrounding English cities in addition to preparing for a German invasion; he was considered a "Designated Person" for the war effort.

In 1946, Spence-Sales was “Lured to McGill University” by friend, former classmate and colleague John Bland. In an interview Spence-Sales once stated that he and Bland were both sent to "the Mother Country to be shaped." They met at a place called, "London House in Mecklenburgh Square in London". The pair would remain lifelong friends. While teaching at McGill University, Spence-Sales in collaboration with Bland established the first ever Canadian graduate studies program in urban and town planning. In 1946, it was imperative that a university program in urban and town planning was established in order to prepare architects for the reconstruction phase that followed the Second World War. Bland and Spence-Sales became "distinguished consultants" in the Canadian profession of town planning and city improvement. They worked on many projects together throughout their respective careers. Many of the projects that they worked on together are listed on McGill University's John Bland Archive website. The Canadian Architecture Collection at McGill University has several physical copies of publications and plans that the duo co-authored together. After Spence-Sales retired from McGill University, the school of architecture was reorganized and an independent school of urban planning was created at McGill between the years 1970 and 1972 . While teaching at McGill University, Spence-Sales ended up instructing world renowned architects, such as, Murray Jones, Len Gurtler, Norbert Schoenauer, Moshe Safdie, William Perks, David Farley, Jeanne Wolfe and Peter Oberlander. Also, while teaching he worked and consulted as an urban planner on projects across Canada.

In 1970, Spence-Sales retired from teaching and moved to Victoria British Columbia with Filer. The couple would eventually settle in Vancouver British Columbia. Throughout the 1970s and 1980s, Spence-Sales began a successful practice as an urban planning consultant; he worked extensively on residential projects in the Victoria and Vancouver regions as well as Oakville Ontario. Spence-Sales once stated that, “[He] had come to Victoria not to retire, but rather start a new life…and participate in another feature of urban growth, emphasizing that his work would not be an ivory tower affair, but would be closely aligned with city staff and public opinion”. During his career he also became a specialist in the area of converting old Industrial buildings into studios and living spaces.

== Environment and Planning Legislation ==
Throughout his career, Spence-Sales made a point of incorporating ecological concerns and natural landscapes into urban planning and architectural projects. A former student of his, Jeanne Wolfe stated that, “Long before ideas about ‘plan with nature’ were articulated, [Harold Spence-Sales] was teaching environmental sensitivity”. During his career, Spence-Sales also became an integral figure in the politics of urban and community planning in Canada; especially in Quebec. In 1949, he "wrote the first compendium of planning law titled, ["Planning Legislation in Canada"] for CMHC, [Canada Mortgage and Housing]".

Spence-Sales also, helped “organize planning departments for the cities of Edmonton and Vancouver, revised the Planning Act of Alberta, and later, that of Newfoundland. He worked on plans for a whole host of cities.These included Edmonton (1948), Vancouver (1949), Sudbury (1950), Comer Brook (1951), Prince Albert (1952), Fredericton (1956), Sept Isles (1957), Moncton (1959), Beaconsfield (1959), Sydney (1960), and Montreal (1960).

In 1949, Spence-Sales published "How to Subdivide" which “became a seminal” work in the field of Canadian urban planning. "How to subdivide", is a manual that walks urban and town planners through the development of a subdivision. "How to subdivide", taught urban and town planners how to maximize profit, space, identify environmental and geographic features in addition to minimizing costs. "How to Subdivide", and Spence-Sales other publications such as, "A Guide to Urban Dispersal" (1956) and "Beautifying Towns" (1967) has inspired as well as influenced the style and thoughts of Canadian urban and town planners for generations.

== Interests in the Arts ==
During his later years, Spence-Sales focused less on his work as an urban planner and pursued projects that were more artistic in nature; often in collaboration with Filer. One of the big art projects that he worked on was the “Touchlines” exhibition. The topic of the “Touchlines” exhibition was an examination of the common lands and borders that the United States of America and Canada share. The “Touchlines” exhibition took place at Western Washington University in Bellingham in 1992 and was co-sponsored by the Simon Fraser University Gallery in Burnaby British Columbia. A project that Spence-Sales and Filer worked on together was "Here, There and Everywhere", a commission that they completed for the Standard Life Building in Toronto Ontario in 1985. He referred to "Here, There and Everywhere" as an urbanistic statement" and believed that it was the first public artwork in Canada on the theme of urbanization.

== Significant Awards and Honors ==
Doctorate of laws from Simon Fraser University with Mary Filer for their contributions to the arts.

Harold Spence-Sales Prize in Urban Planning. A scholarship set up in Spence-Sales memory for a student studying urban planning at McGill University.

Being granted the position of Emeritus professor at McGill University in 1987.

Being Inducted into the Canadian Institute of Planners as a Fellow.

== Selected Projects ==
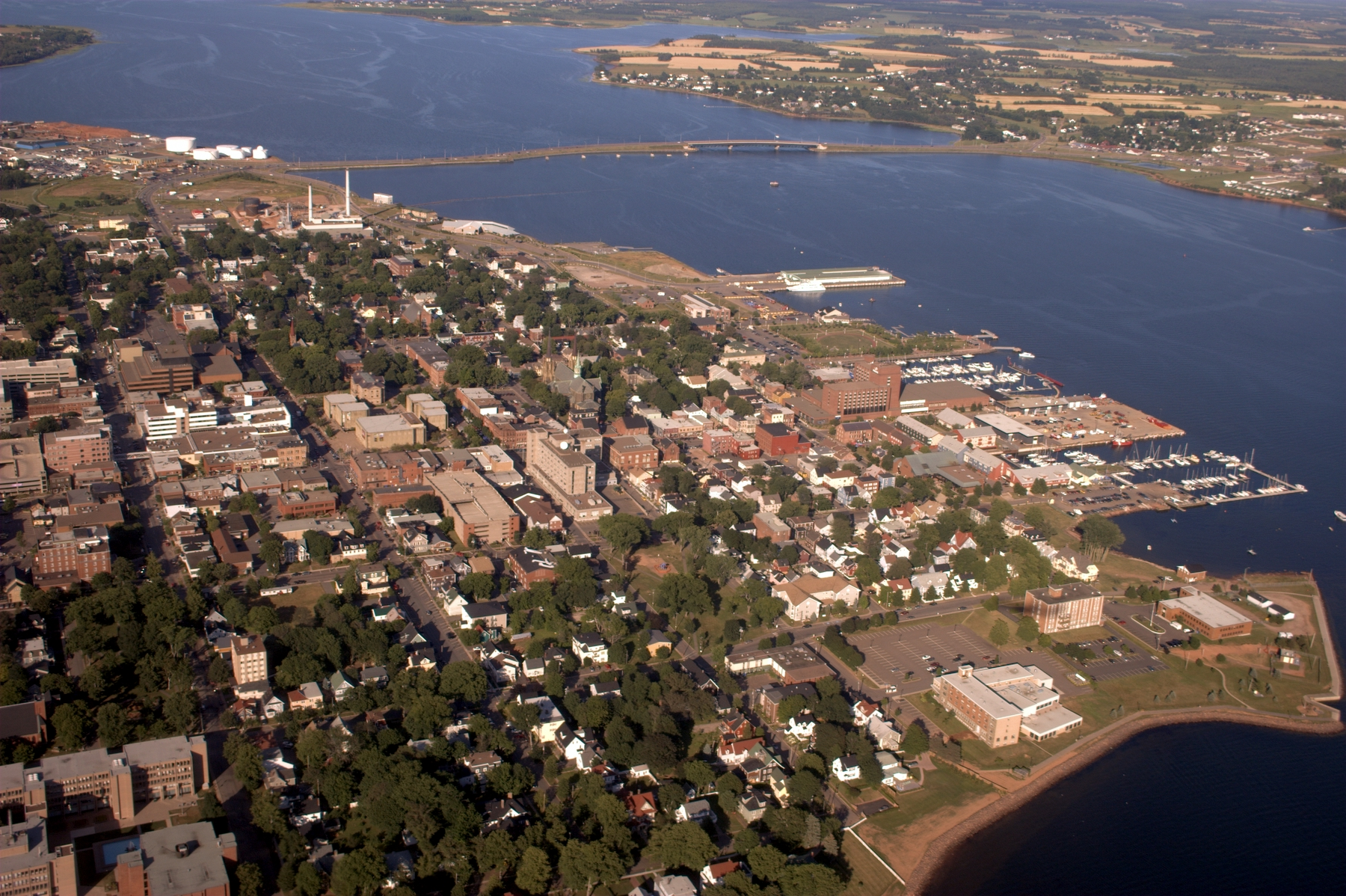
Aerial View of Charlottetown Prince Edward Island.

The projects listed below are considered some of the most important projects that Spence-Sales worked on according to his entry in the Canadian Encyclopedia.

New town developed by Spence-Sales: Oromocto New Brunswick. Spence-Sales worked on the Oromocto project from 1956 to 1958.

New town developed by Spence-Sales: Preville: Quebec.

Spence-Sales master planner: Charlottetown: Prince Edward Island.

Spence-Sales master planner: Sudbury Ontario.

Spence-Sales master planner: Prince Albert Saskatchewan.

== Archives ==
The Harold Spence-Sales archival fonds can be found in the McGill University Library's Canadian Architecture Collection.
